= Jane Dunnewold =

American textile artist and author

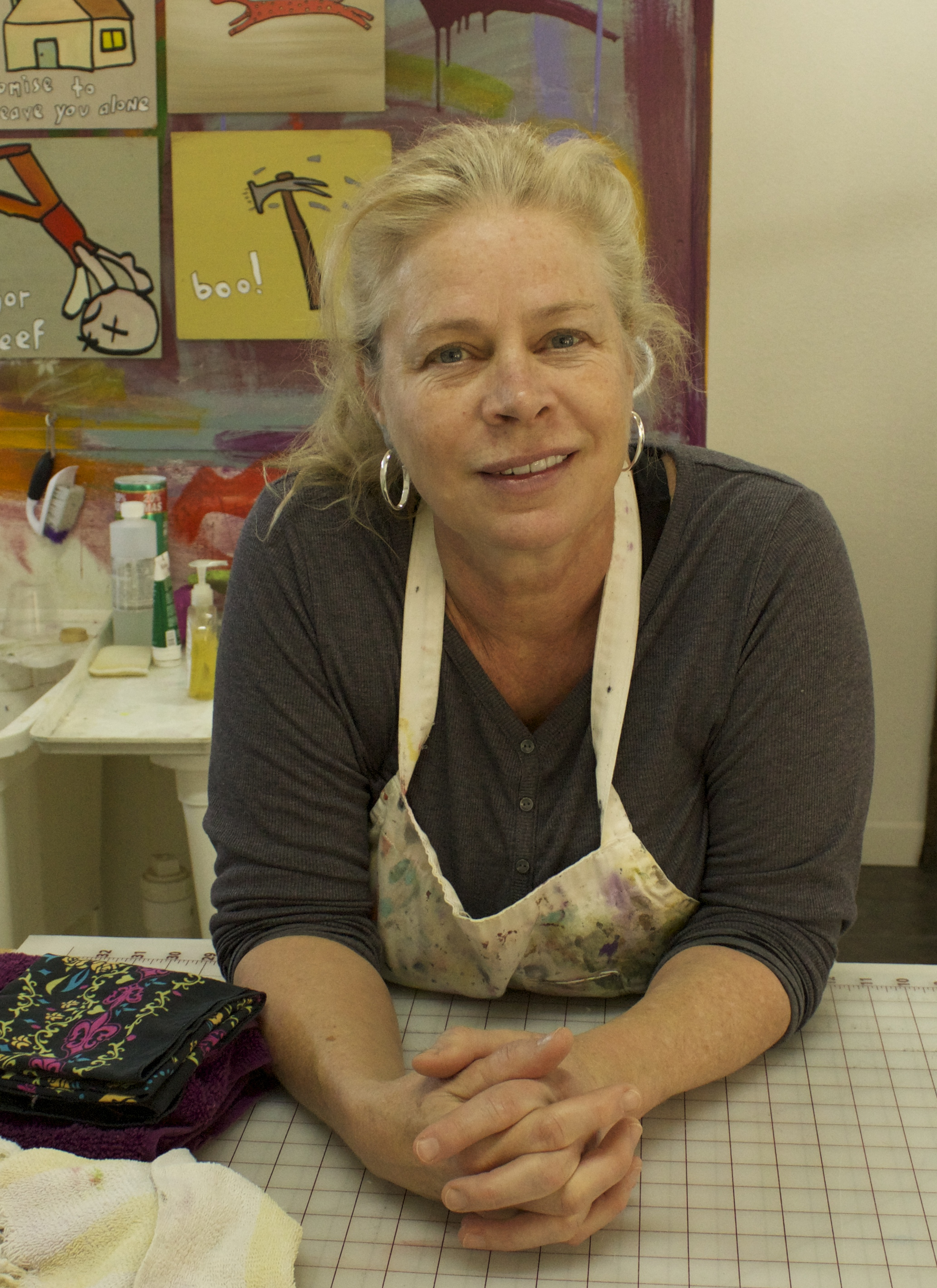

Jane Dunnewold is an American textile artist and author. She was previously the president of the Surface Design Association.

== Biography ==
Dunnewold was born in Oberlin, Ohio, United States, and currently lives in San Antonio, Texas with her family.

== Exhibitions ==
=== Solo exhibitions ===
- 2016: Inspired by The Masters. Visions Art Museum. San Diego, CA.
- 2016: Quilt/Not Quilt Fibreworks Gallery. British Columbia, Canada. New Work.
- 2013: Lyrical Thread. Radius Gallery. San Antonio, TX.
- 2013: Artists Looking At Art. MCNay Art Museum. San Antonio, TX.
- 2011: Etudes: A Daily Practice. Hite Institute for Art. University of Louisville. KY. Sacred Planet. Schweinfurth Art Center. Auburn, NY.
- 2010: Sacred Planet. Boger Gallery. College of the Ozarks. Point Lookout MO.
- 2010: Intimate Conversations. Festival of Arts. Birmingham UK.
- 2007: New Work. Textilkundst. Munich, Germany.
- 2005: Disciple of Life. Woven: A Textile Art Space. Philadelphia PA. 2002: ArtCloth. Textile Center. Minneapolis MN.
- 2001: Pray without Ceasing. Mendocino College Gallery. Ukiah CA.
- 2001: Homage to the Tao. Jane Sauer Gallery. Santa Fe NM.

=== Selected Invitational and Juried Exhibitions ===
- 2016: 2016 Visionmakers. 108 Contemporary. Tulsa. OK.
- 2016: The Artist as Maker, Thinker, Feeler. Cade Art Gallery. Anne Arundel Community College. Arnold. MD.
- 2016: Breakout: Quilt Visions. Visions Quilt Museum. San Diego. CA.
- 2016: Stories of Migration. Textile Museum. Washington DC.
- 2015: Quilt National. Dairy Barn Art Center. Ohio.
- 2015: Two by Twenty. Sponsored by Studio Art Quilt Associates. Currently traveling
- internationally.
- 2015: Contemporary Fiber: Breaking Traditions. Lore Degenstein Gallery, Susquehanna University. PA.
- 2014: Timeless Meditations. Tubac Art Center. Tubac, AZ. Best of Show.
- 2014: International TECHstyle Art Biennial. San Jose Museum of Quilts & Textiles. CA.
- 2013: FiberArt International. Pittsburgh Center for the Arts. Pittsburgh, PA.
- 2013: Chautauqua National Juried Exhibition: Crossroads. Richmond, KY.
- 2012: Timeless Meditations. Tubac Art Center. Tubac, AZ. Best of Show.
- 2012: Textiles Today. Durango Arts Center. Durango, CO.
- 2011: Green: the Color and the Cause. The Textile Museum. Smithsonian Museums. Washington DC. 2010
- 2010: ArtCloth: Engaging New Visions. Fairfield City Museum and Stein Gallery. Sydney, Australia.
  - Orange Regional Gallery. New South Wales, Australia.
  - Wangaratta Gallery. Victoria, Australia.
- 2008: Freedom: The Fiber of Our Nation. Textile Center. Minneapolis MN.
- 2007: Unfurled: Expressive Cloth. Robert Hillestad Gallery. University of Nebraska. Curator and exhibitor. Lincoln NE.
- 2007: Lush: Art Fabrics. Grimshaw-Gudiwicz Art Gallery. Fall River, MA.
- 2007: Art Cloth: Spanning Continents. Houston, Texas. Curator and exhibitor.
- 2006: Never Static. Textile Center of Minnesota. Juror and participant.
- 2003: Craft 2003. Houston Center for Contemporary Craft. Houston TX. Honorable Mention

== Awards ==
- 2002: Quilts Japan Prize
- 2019 San Antonio Art League Artist of the Year

== Publications ==
Dunnewold has published several books including:

- 1996: Complex Cloth: A Comprehensive Guide to Surface Design
- 2010: Art Cloth: A Guide to Surface Design for FabricArt Cloth: A Guide to Surface Design for Fabric
- 2016: Creative Strength Training: Prompts, Exercises and Stories to Encourage Artistic Genius, North Light Books.
