= Pittsburgh Dad =

US web series

- Title from opening sequence, used from 2011 to mid-2018
- Born: Curt Wootton; January 22, 1979 (age 47); Fairmont, West Virginia, U.S.
- Occupation: Comedian

YouTube information
- Channel: Pittsburgh Dad
- Years active: 2011-present
- Genre: Comedy
- Subscribers: 274 thousand
- Views: 77 million
- Last updated: November 19, 2022
- Website: pghdad.com

Pittsburgh Dad is an online series of short films featuring the observations of a blue-collar father from Pittsburgh who speaks with a thick Pittsburghese dialect. The web series was created by Chris Preksta and Curt Wootton in 2011. Wootton plays the namesake character of Pittsburgh Dad in the series.

== Background ==
The title character watching the Pittsburgh Penguins. Note the character's stereotypical Pittsburgh glasses and facial hair, along with the Iron City Brewing Company sign in the background.

Preksta, a native of Munhall, Pennsylvania and a graduate of Point Park University and Pittsburgh Filmmakers, serves as director. Wootton, a native of Greensburg, Pennsylvania who graduated from West Virginia University, plays the "Pittsburgh Dad". Wootton and Preksta met on the set of the 2005 web series Captain Blasto. They later collaborated on The Mercury Men for the Syfy network, where Wootton entertained the crew with a character based on his own father, Keith, emulating the thick Western Pennsylvania accent of his youth. The Pittsburgh Post-Gazette describes the character as "Archie Bunker from Dahntahn or S'Liberty or Little Warshington," referencing Pittsburgh locales.

Each episode lasts about two to nine minutes and opens with a piano theme song reminiscent of the intro to another Pittsburgh-based program, Mister Rogers' Neighborhood. Each show features the Pittsburgh Dad delivering soliloquies on topics including "grass clippings," "freeze pops," and "jagoffs in Baltimore/Philadelphia," all punctuated by an exaggerated laugh track, which would eventually be removed.

The idiosyncrasies of the Pittsburgh dialect plays a large role in the show, including such regional words as "yinz," which means "you (plural)"; "nebby", which describes a nosy person; and "redd up", an idiomatic phrase (imported from Scots into regional American English) which means to clean up and/or to make a space orderly.

On February 11, 2019, Keith Wootton, the father of Curt Wootton and one of the major inspirations for the series, died.

== Reception ==
The first several episodes were recorded "just for fun" on an iPhone, with the intended audience only the two men's families and friends. It quickly became an Internet hit, generating 3 million YouTube views within 6 months. The series appeals to both current and ex-Pittsburghers, many of whom relate to the character's speech patterns and temperament.

In 2011, the Pittsburgh Post-Gazette named it the 3rd best internet video of the year.

In November 2012, both Preksta and Wootton were hosts and guests of the annual Three Rivers Film Festival in Pittsburgh.

In October 2013, Pittsburgh restaurant chain Eat'n Park issued a special edition "Smiley Cookie" bearing Pittsburgh Dad's face; the cookie, which was to raise funds for UPMC Children's Hospital of Pittsburgh, was the first ever Smiley Cookie to feature the likeness of a living person.

Based on the mention of Hills in the Back to the Future-themed episode as well as several episodes of Dad wearing Hills-themed attire, a Pittsburgh-based candle company released a "Pittsburgh Dad's Hills Snack Bar" scented candle that is supposed to replicate the smell of the popular snack bar from the now-defunct chain.

=== Controversy ===
On January 4, 2015, a video quickly surfaced of Wootton being out of character at a bar watching both the Steelers playoff game against the Baltimore Ravens as well as the Pittsburgh Penguins game against the Montreal Canadiens that were playing concurrently. In the video, a drunken Wootton criticized the Penguins game and ice hockey in general in a profanity-laced rant caused by the Steelers losing the game to their archrival; both games resulted in lopsided defeats for the Pittsburgh teams. The next day, Wootton acknowledged the incident happening and apologized on his official Facebook page. The following episode of Pittsburgh Dad posted January 7, 2015, poked fun at the incident, with Dad (all covered in Penguins gear in his kitchen) poking fun at Wootton and at the end of the episode breaking the fourth wall by acknowledging that Pittsburgh Dad is a series. The incident would later be briefly referenced in the episode "Dad Goes Back to the Future."

== In other media ==
The Pittsburgh Post-Gazette has published guest columns written by "Pittsburgh Dad," including one for Father's Day 2013.

On December 19, 2014, WPXI aired a Pittsburgh Dad-themed Christmas special, Pittsburgh Dad's Guide to Christmas. Hosted by WQED personality Rick Sebak, the special showed Pittsburgh Dad's previous Christmas specials, as well as debuting a new one at the end. The 1960s-era NBC "Laramie Peacock" made a cameo appearance at the beginning of the special.

On July 19, 2017, Pittsburgh Dad aired his first short film, Street Light Stories. The special detailed what family life was like in Pittsburgh circa summer 1987. The film, while having the characters from Pittsburgh Dad, is considered by Wootton to be non-canon to the main Pittsburgh Dad series. Due to the popularity of the film, Wootton and Preskta launched a Kickstarter campaign to create a sequel; the Kickstarter campaign proved so successful it allowed Wootton and Preskta to produce two sequels.

Wootton (in character as Dad) and Preskta appeared on the January 31, 2020, episode of The Price is Right, sitting in the audience. After the taping, host Drew Carey allowed Wootton to spin The Big Wheel, during which he nags at Deb & the kids to not use as much utilities and "also hi to Coach Cowher". Wootton and Preskta were at the December 2019 taping of the episode in order to tape a special episode of Pittsburgh Dad after becoming "Twitter friends" with native Clevelander Carey, as well as a follow-up to a 2014 episode of Pittsburgh Dad watching The Price is Right at home.
