= Three Rivers Film Festival =

- Frequency: Annual
- Locations: Pittsburgh, Pennsylvania
- Inaugurated: June 4, 1982
- Most recent: November 12-23, 2025
- Participants: 4000
- Website: filmpittsburgh.org/pages/three-rivers-film-festival

The Three Rivers Film Festival is an annual film festival, held in Pittsburgh, Pennsylvania and is presented by Film Pittsburgh.

Founded as part of the Three Rivers Arts Festival in 1981, the first annual festival was June 4, 1982. Thirteen films premiered that year, including the locally shot Knightriders starring Ed Harris, Patricia Tallman and Tom Savini. In 1993 the festival moved its programming to the fall. The festival briefly reconnected for one year with the Three Rivers Arts Festival in 2018. The festival is the oldest and largest annual film festival in Western Pennsylvania.

The Festival's 15th anniversary in 1996 featured Flirt.

The 2012 festival featured over 50 films, was 3 weeks long and included visits by Curt Wootton and Chris Preksta. Among the locations were the Harris Theater in Pittsburgh's Cultural District among others. Festival sidebars for 2012 included Polish Cinema, Women Filmmakers and Coming-of-Age films and had major sponsorships from the Pittsburgh Cultural Trust, Carnegie Mellon University, the University of Pittsburgh, the Art Institute, Avis, and Kodak.

In 2019, the festival screened 40 films, over 16 days. Opening night featured three film screenings, Memphis Belle: A Story of a Flying Fortress directed by William Wyler at the Rangos Giant Cinema, with special guest Catherine Wyler, the filmmaker’s daughter. The Green Fog an experimental film directed by Guy Maddin screened at Regent Square Theater with the filmmaker present. Say Amen, Somebody, George Nierenberg's 1982 look at gospel music screened at Harris Theater.

== History ==
- 1982 June 4-
- 1983
- 1984 June 15–24
- 1985 -June 23
- 1986
- 1987
- 1988 -June 4
- 1989 May 26 – June 4
- 1990
- 1991 May 31 – June 16
- 1992
- 1993 Oct. 29 – Nov. 7
- 1994 -Nov. 14
- 1995 Nov. 10–21
- 1996 Nov. 1–14
- 1997
- 1998
- 1999
- 2000 Nov. 2–18
- 2001 -Nov. 18
- 2002
- 2003 Nov. 7–23 with Stephanie Beroes in attendance.
- 2004 Nov. 5–18
- 2005 Nov. 4–17
- 2006 Nov. 2–16 with the premier of the film Pittsburgh
- 2007 Nov. 2–7
- 2008 Nov. 7–22
- 2009 Nov. 6–21
- 2010 Nov. 5–20
- 2011 Nov. 4–19
- 2012 Nov. 2–17
- 2013 Nov. 8–23
- 2014 Nov. 7–22
- 2015 Nov. 6–15
- 2016 Nov. 16–20
- 2017 No Festival
- 2018 Jun. 1–10
- 2019 Nov. 8–23

== See also ==
- Pittsburgh Film Office
- Pittsburgh Filmmakers
- Pittsburgh Center for the Arts
- List of films shot in Pittsburgh
- Paramount Film Exchange (Pittsburgh)
