= Pittsburgh Filmmakers' School of Film, Photography, and Digital Media =

Former film school in Pittsburgh, Pennsylvania

Coordinates: 40.4559°N 79.9536°W

- Type: Private
- Active: 1999–2019
- Location: Pittsburgh, Pennsylvania, United States
- Campus: Urban
- Website: http://pghfilmmakers.org

Pittsburgh Filmmakers' School of Film, Photography, and Digital Media was a private institution of higher education located in Pittsburgh, Pennsylvania. It was an accredited film school that was run by Pittsburgh Filmmakers, a well-known regional media arts center and non-profit organization.

== Academics ==
Pittsburgh Filmmakers' School of Film, Photography, and Digital Media did not award any academic degrees. However, it did offer certificate programs in the areas of film production, digital video, and photography. These certificate programs took students a minimum of six semesters (or about two to three years) to complete; there was no minimum number of courses that students were required to take per semester. Over 75 different courses were available to students, with a comprehensive series of film classes and a range of workshops exploring related topics, such as animation and media literacy.

The student body was a mix of part-time independent students and students from nearby colleges and universities taking courses to earn credit at their own institutions, including the University of Pittsburgh, Carnegie Mellon University, Point Park University, Duquesne University, Robert Morris University, La Roche College, Seton Hill University, and Carlow University.

== Campus ==
The School was situated near Carnegie Mellon University, in a complex which also housed the Pittsburgh Filmmakers administrative offices, the Melwood Screening Room theater, and the Pittsburgh Filmmakers Library's collection of books, DVDs, stock footage, music, and other archival material. No campus housing was available for full-time students at the School.

== Accreditation ==
Pittsburgh Filmmakers' School of Film, Photography, and Digital Media was an accredited member of the National Association of Schools of Art and Design until 2019.

== See also ==
- Pittsburgh Film Office
- Three Rivers Film Festival
