= Pittsburgh Film Office =

- Founded: 1990
- Founder: Russell Streiner
- Purpose: Television and film production in Pittsburgh
- Location(s): 535 Smithfield Street; Pittsburgh, Pennsylvania
- Origins: circa 1988 "Greater Pittsburgh Office of Promotions"
- Key people: Dawn M. Keezer, Director
- Employees: 3 full time employees and a 27 member Board of Trustees
- Website: http://www.pghfilm.org/

The Pittsburgh Film Office (PFO) is a non-profit 501(c)(3) corporation dedicated to economic development in the Pittsburgh and southwestern Pennsylvania region.

== History ==
Created in 1990 to attract film production projects to the greater Southwestern Pennsylvania region, the Pittsburgh Film Office provides information on the region, locations, vendors and crew, and coordinates interactions between government and business offices in support of film production. In addition, the film office is a conduit for information, providing assistance to local filmmakers and the local film industry throughout Allegheny County and the designated ten county region.

Since its creation, the film office has assisted with more than two hundred major feature and television projects, and has reported an economic impact of more than $1.2 billion on southwestern Pennsylvania.

In 2007, the Film Office played a major role in supporting of the Pennsylvania Film Tax Credit, a program that allows a 25% tax credit to productions that spend at least 60% of the production budget in the Commonwealth. This tax credit has been a decisive factor in bringing the filming of several recent movies to the state.

The Pittsburgh Film Office is a member of the Association of Film Commissioners International.

== "Lights! Glamour! Action!" Oscar Gala ==
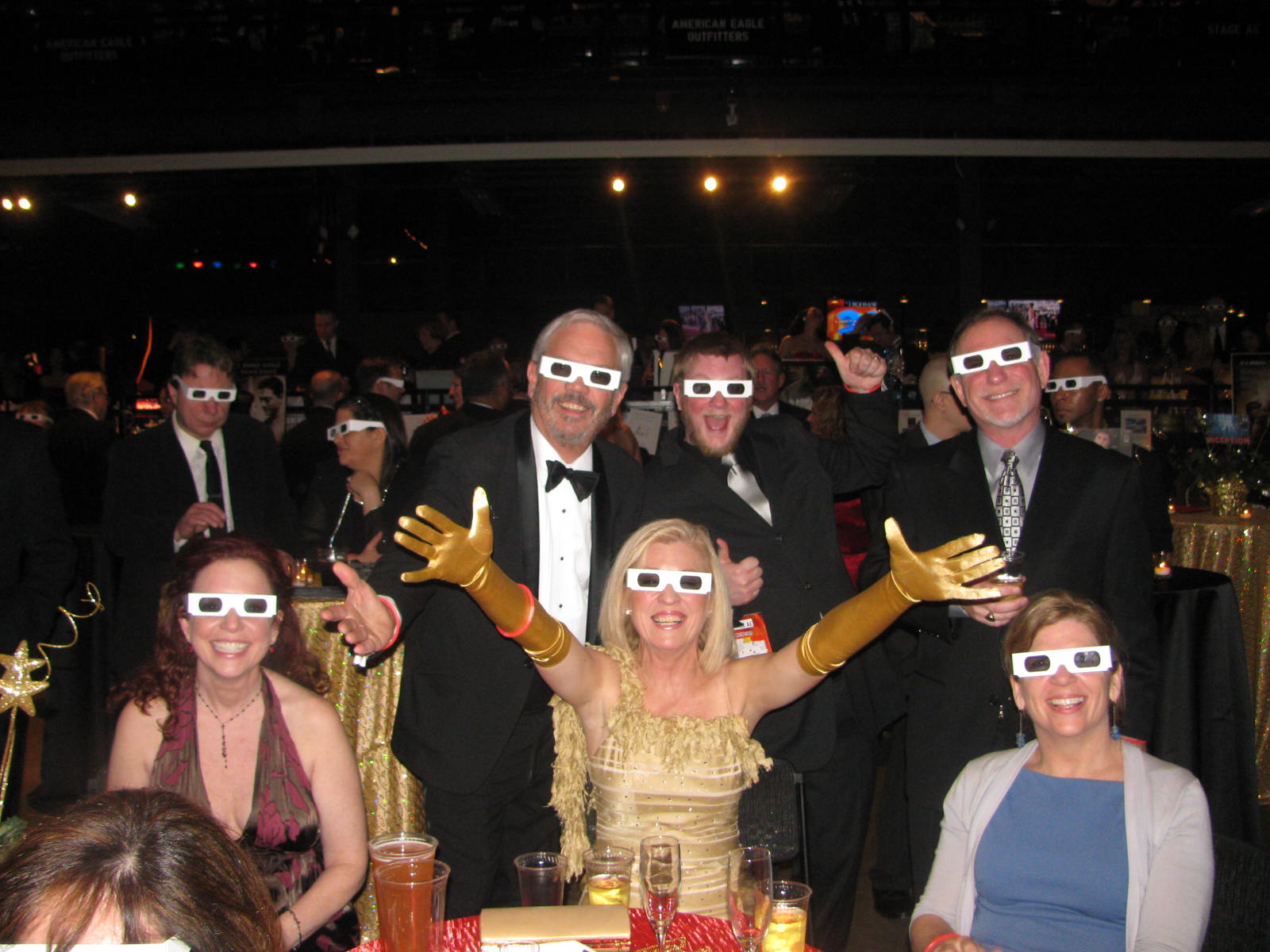
Guests of the 2011 fundraiser at Stage AE enjoy the 3D presentation

The Academy Awards benefit, “Lights! Glamour! Action!,” is an annual Gala supporting the Pittsburgh Film Office.

The 2011 "Pittsburgh Stars" video was broadcast in 3D. More than nine hundred people gathered to watch the live telecast of the Academy Awards at Stage AE. Six local salons styled models based on nominated films and graced the stage during a live fashion presentation, and more than one hundred and sixty items were featured in the silent auction.

In 2020, Michelle Wright and Ashley Dougherty from WTAE (ABC) hosted the second consecutive year of Pittsburgh's biggest night in film. The 20th annual Lights! Glamour! Action! drew 750 attendees to The Pennsylvanian on February 8.

=== Event History ===
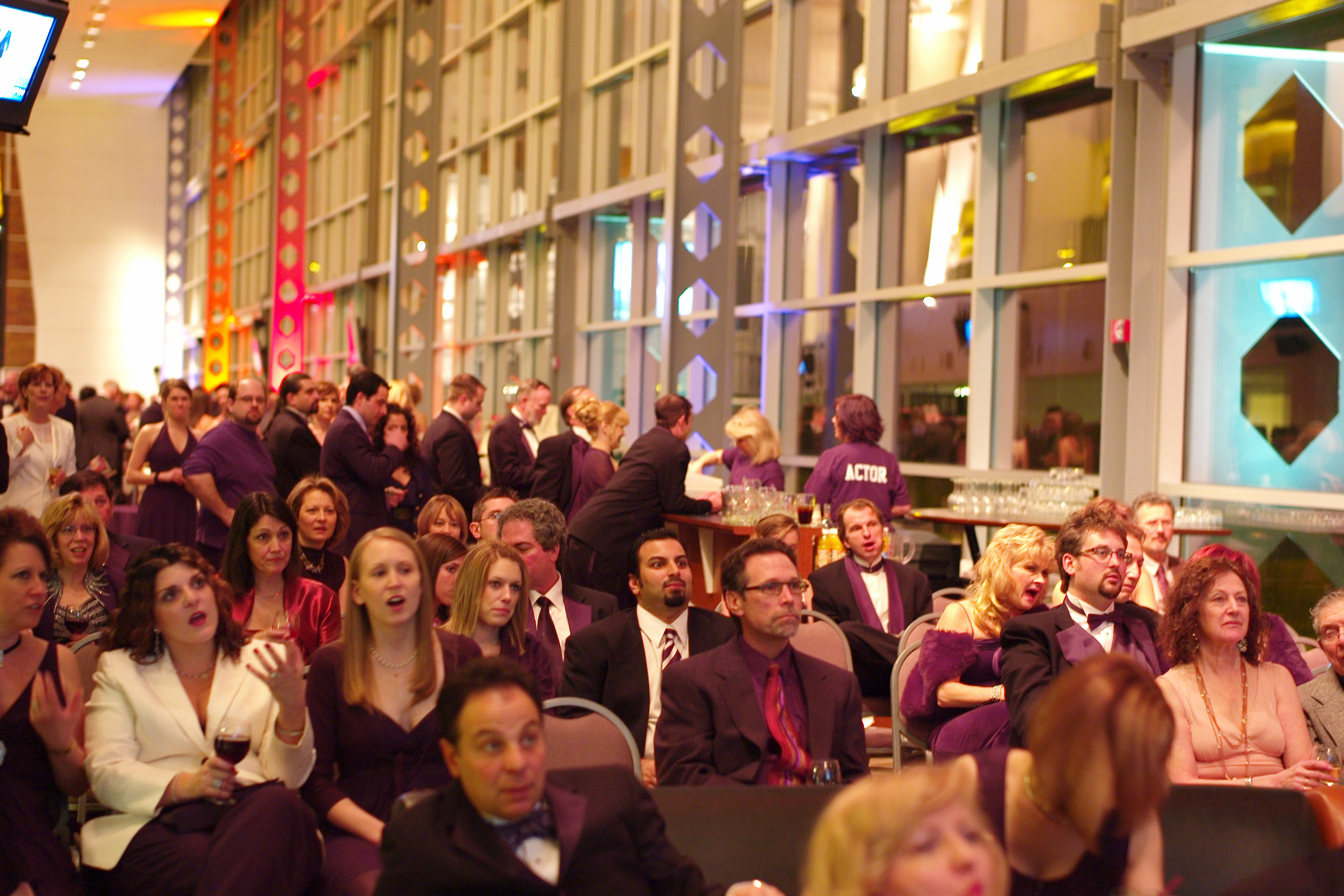
Guests of the 2007 event at Heinz Field

Date	Venue	Location
March 25, 2001	Loews Waterfront Theater	Suburban W. Homestead
March 24, 2002	Loews Waterfront Theater	Suburban W. Homestead
March 23, 2003	Loews Waterfront Theater	Suburban W. Homestead
February 29, 2004	Loews Waterfront Theater	Suburban W. Homestead
February 27, 2005	SouthSide Works Cinema	South Side neighborhood
March 5, 2006	SouthSide Works Cinema	South Side neighborhood
February 25, 2007	Heinz Field	North Shore neighborhood
February 24, 2008	Heinz Field	North Shore neighborhood
February 22, 2009	Heinz Field	North Shore neighborhood
March 7, 2010	August Wilson Center	Downtown
February 27, 2011	Stage AE	North Shore neighborhood
February 26, 2012	Heinz Field	North Shore neighborhood
February 24, 2013	Heinz Field	North Shore neighborhood
March 2, 2014	Heinz Field	North Shore neighborhood
February 22, 2015	Heinz Field	North Shore

== See also ==
- List of films shot in Pittsburgh
- List of television shows shot in Pittsburgh
- Three Rivers Film Festival
- Pittsburgh Filmmakers' School of Film, Photography, and Digital Media
