= Pennsylvania Film Production Tax Credit =

The Pennsylvania Film Production Tax Credit is a tax credit program supporting the production of feature films and television programs in Pennsylvania. The tax credit was signed into law by Gov. Ed Rendell in July 2004.

The tax credit for qualifying productions equals a 25% reduction in Personal Income Tax, Corporate Net Income, Capital Stock/Foreign Franchise Tax. However, because most productions filming in Pennsylvania do not incur a tax liability in the state, the credits are fully transferable, which means they can be sold to a company or individual in the state who does have a tax liability. In order to qualify for the tax credit, the production must incur 60% of its total production expenses within Pennsylvania. The credit also applies to individual television shows that are 15 minutes or longer and intended for a national audience.

Watchdogs, including the Pennsylvania Common Cause criticized lobbyist Leslie McCombs for failing to properly register as a lobbyist for Lions Gate Entertainment while lobbying on behalf of the tax credit.

A 2009 report from the Legislative Budget and Finance Committee in the Pennsylvania General Assembly found that the tax credit supported 4,000 jobs and produced $4.5 million between 2007 and 2008.

During the 2009 Pennsylvania budget impasse, the tax credit was in danger of being repealed. Instead, its total amount was reduced from $75 million to $42 million, with that number increasing to $60 million the next year. The tax credit was expanded again during the state budget negotiations in summer 2016. $65 million will be available for fiscal year 2017–18.

The tax credit brought the production of Zack and Miri Make a Porno, The Road, Shelter, Shannon's Rainbow, Sorority Row, and She's Out of My League to the Pittsburgh region in 2008 and 2009. The majority of filming for I Am Number Four also took place in the greater Pittsburgh area in 2010 due to the tax credit.

== See also ==
- Greater Philadelphia Film Office
- Pittsburgh Film Office
