= Pittsburgh Filmmakers =

- Pittsburgh Filmmakers logo

- Location within Pittsburgh
- Established: 1971
- Dissolved: 2019
- Location: Pittsburgh
- Coordinates: 40.455971°N 79.953664°W
- Website: http://pghfilmmakers.org

Pittsburgh Filmmakers was one of the oldest and largest media arts centers in the United States, operating from 1971 to 2019.

The non-profit institution in Pittsburgh, Pennsylvania began as a filmmaking equipment access cooperative founded by curator Sally Dixon in 1971. The co-op remained a pillar of the organization throughout its life, supporting projects that grew to include a NASAD-accredited film school, the Three Rivers Film Festival, and three repertory theaters—most prominently the Harris Theater, which remains in operation under the management of the Pittsburgh Cultural Trust.

Artist alumni of Pittsburgh Filmmakers include Peggy Ahwesh, Tony Buba, Greg Mottola, and Victoria Pedretti.

== History ==
Starting in 1969, Chuck Glassmire hosted an experimental film series at the Crumbling Wall coffeehouse at 4515 Forbes Ave. The screenings drew a regular audience from the Carnegie Museum of Art across the street, where Dixon was in the process of launching the museum's Film Section (later Department of Film and Video), one of the first of its kind in the country. In 1970, Dixon raised funding for an expanded screening program, bringing visiting artists to town for in-person exhibitions and providing 16mm filmmaking equipment so that they could also work on new films while in residence. At first called "Pittsburgh Independent Film-Makers," her group secured a space in the basement of the Selma Burke Arts Center at 6118 Penn Circle South in East Liberty. They set up darkrooms and filmmaking facilities, and began to offer workshops in the use of equipment.

In 1971, the group formally incorporated under the name Pittsburgh Filmmakers, with Bob Costa (1971) as its first executive director, followed by Phil Curry (1971-1973) and Robert Haller (1973-1979). Haller, a photographer and curator at Anthology Film Archives in New York, supported the addition of still photography to the organization's mandate. In 1974, when lack of space became an issue, the University of Pittsburgh offered Filmmakers an empty building at 205 Oakland Ave., in the heart of the Oakland university district, for use as an equipment facility. Subsequent executive directors of the organization were Marilyn Levin (1979-1983), Bob Marinaccio (1983-1987), Jan Erlich-Moss (1987), Tony Buba (1988), Margaret Meyers (1988-1991), Kurt Saunders (1991-1992), Marcia Clark (1992), and Brady Lewis (1992). By 1992, the organization had grown to a staff of 18 full-time and 8 part-time employees, and was operating at three more locations—a classroom and editing facility at 218 Oakland Ave., administrative offices around the corner at 3712 Forbes Ave., and the screening program at the Fulton Theater Annex in the Fulton Building at 101 Sixth St.

The organization's longest-serving executive director, Charlie Humphrey (1992-2015), began his tenure with a campaign to modernize and unify the facilities in one location. In the summer of 1995, Pittsburgh Filmmakers opened the doors at 477 Melwood Ave., its home for the next 23 years. The 44,000-square-foot (4,100 m^{2}) space, formerly used as Carnegie Mellon University's Tartan Labs, contained an equipment room, classrooms, darkrooms, offices, a cafe, a library, and the 130-seat Melwood Screening Room. That same year, the screening program moved temporarily to a Point Park College venue at 222 Craft Ave., and then found a permanent home at the Harris Theater, a former X-rated movie house at 809 Liberty Ave. in the downtown Cultural District. In early 1998, Filmmakers also purchased the Regent Square Theater, at 1035 South Braddock Ave. The film school received accreditation in 1999, and spurred the introduction of DV video equipment for student use. In 2001, at the organization's point of maximum development, a renovation of the second floor of 477 Melwood added more offices and classrooms, digital editing suites, a sound stage, a gallery for photo exhibitions, and an additional 60-seat theater.

In 2003, a number of the institutional connections that had existed since Pittsburgh Filmmakers' founding were severed. The Carnegie Museum of Art closed its film department, and Point Park College became the first of the organization's partner schools to start its own competing in-house film degree program. In 2006, Pittsburgh Filmmakers merged with the Pittsburgh Center for the Arts (PCA), following votes by the organizations' respective membership and boards; the combined organization took the new name Pittsburgh Filmmakers/Pittsburgh Center for the Arts (PF/PCA) and used the PCA's Marshall Mansion building in Shadyside as its headquarters. In 2010, PF/PCA attempted further merger discussions with the Pittsburgh Glass Center, but negotiations failed by May 2011. In 2015, Humphrey resigned as executive director. The last executive directors of the organization while it retained the Pittsburgh Filmmakers name were Pete Mendes (2015-2016), Germaine Williams (2017-2018), and Dan Demicell (2018).

== Dissolution ==
In 2018, classes were cancelled and the 477 Melwood building was sold back to CMU. PF/PCA consolidated at the Marshall Mansion location and rebranded as the Pittsburgh Center for Arts and Media (PCA&M). In 2019, the Regent Square Theater was closed, all film operations were ended, and the school's accreditation was withdrawn.
