= The Mercury Men =

- Genre: Sci Fi
- Written by: Christopher Preksta
- Directed by: Christopher Preksta
- Starring: Mark Tierno; Curt Wootton; Amy Staggs
- Original language: English
- No. of seasons: 1
- No. of episodes: 10

Production
- Running time: approximately 7 minutes

Original release
- Network: Syfy
- Release: July 25 – August 5, 2011

The Mercury Men is a 2011 web series produced for the Syfy network by writer/director Christopher Preksta. It is shot in a retro, 1950s style, in black and white (stock photos of Apollo are in color). It is set in the mid-1970s, shortly after the Apollo Moon landings. The first episode is set explicitly in 1975 and the following eight episodes take place on the same night. The tenth episode is said to take place in 1976, but the month and day are unspecified. The time gap between the ninth and tenth episodes is unclear but presumably significant, as the protagonist manages to travel from Earth to Mercury within that time. Each episode is between 6 and 9 minutes long. The show follows the adventures of a mild-mannered office worker, Edward Borman (Mark Tierno) who is drawn into an adventure when his building is attacked by men from the planet Mercury, who appear to be made of pure light. Their plan is to use the steel framework of the building to enhance their gravity device which will pull down the Moon into the Earth. He meets Jack Yaeger (Curt Wootton), a member of a secretive group of defenders known as The League. It was shot in Pittsburgh, Pennsylvania, on a budget of under $10,000.

== Cast ==
- Mark Tierno as Edward Borman
- Curt Wootton as Jack Yaeger
- Amy Staggs as Grace

== Episodes ==
No.	Title
1	"Invasion"
Edward Borman becomes trapped when deadly creatures from the planet Mercury overrun his building, killing anyone in their path.
2	"Sykscraper Saboteurs"
Jack and Edward trail the Mercury Men through the mammoth skyscraper to discover their destructive plans.
3	"Contacting the League"
Outnumbered and outmatched, Jack and Edward attempt to radio the "League" for help.
4	"Engineer Attack"
Separated from Jack, Edward is trapped inside a descending elevator with a ruthless Mercury Engineer.
5	"Battery"
Jack and Edward uncover the evil architect of the catastrophic plan to destroy Earth.
6	"The Men of Tomorrow"
Alone and afraid, Edward is contacted by the mysterious commander of the League.
7	"Enemies of Earth"
Edward attempts to free Jack, who is tortured at the hands of the malevolent Mercury Men.
8	"The Gravity Engine"
Disguised as a Mercury Engineer, Jack and Edward attempt to reverse the Gravity Engine before the fall of the Moon.
9	"Magnetic Tower Assault"
Edward desperately fends off the brutal attack of the Mercury Men while Jack struggles to reverse the Gravity Engine in time.
10	"The First World"
While exploring the Chief Designer's abandoned launch facility on the planet Mercury, Jack is attacked by a shadowy assassin.
