= Pittsburgh Glass Center =

Glass gallery in Pittsburgh, Pennsylvania

- Pittsburgh Glass Center logo

- Location within Pittsburgh
- Established: 2001
- Location: 5472 Penn Avenue; Pittsburgh, Pennsylvania 15206
- Coordinates: 40.464187°N 79.932919°W
- Website: www.pittsburghglasscenter.org

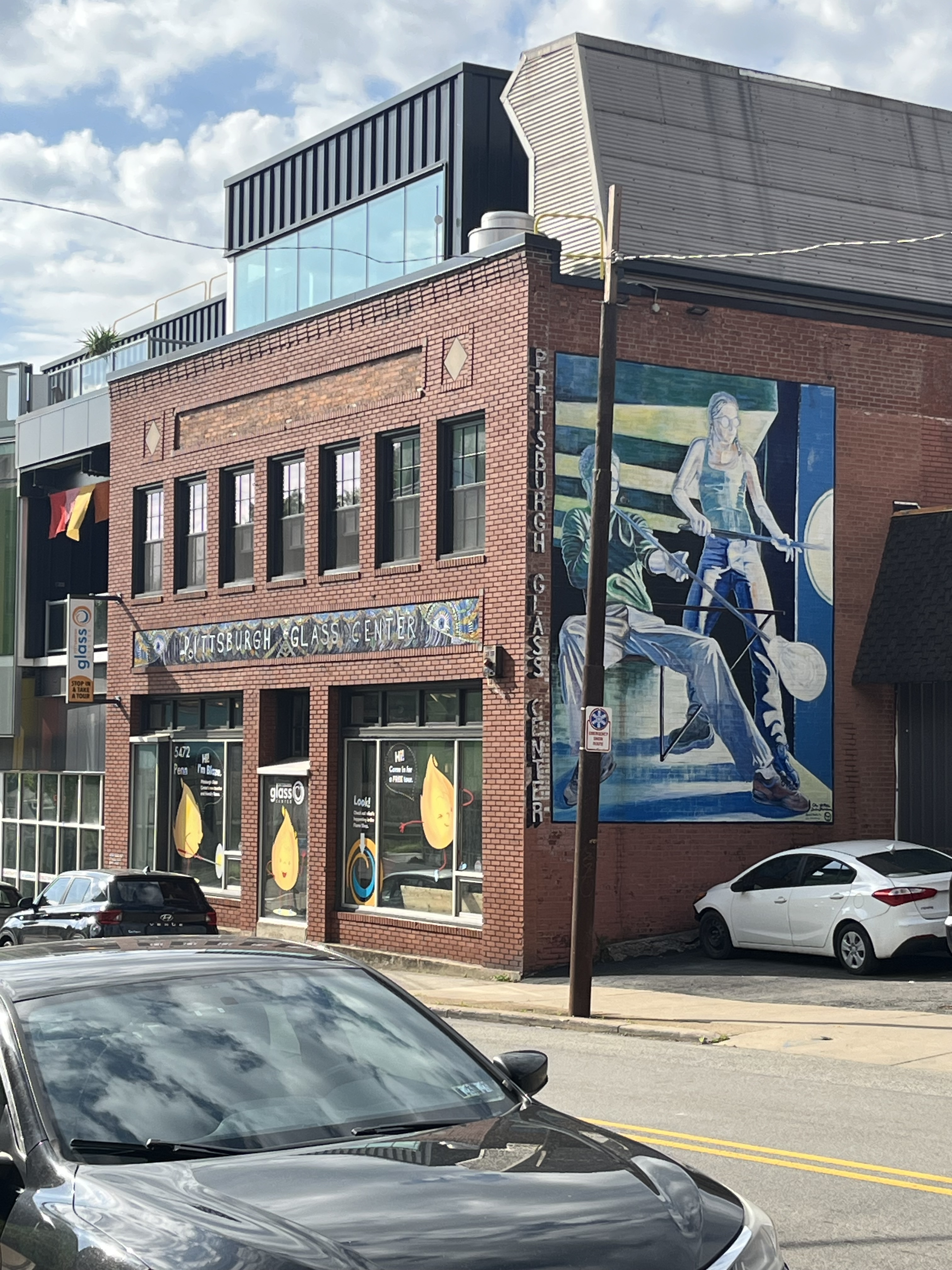
Pittsburgh glass center building in 2026

The Pittsburgh Glass Center is a gallery, glass studio, and public-access school dedicated to teaching, creating and promoting studio glass art. It is located on Penn Avenue in the Friendship neighborhood of Pittsburgh. It has features works by Paul Joseph Stankard and classes taught by Dante Marioni, Davide Salvadore, and Cesare Toffolo.

The origins of the Pittsburgh Glass Center date to 1991, when David Stephens, then visual-arts officer of the Pennsylvania Council on the Arts, approached glass artists Ron Desmett and Kathleen Mulcahy, then a professor at Carnegie Mellon University, about the idea of a center for studio glass. It was originally to have been the Elizabeth Glass Center in Elizabeth, Pennsylvania. However, by 1999, the plans had changed and the center was re-oriented to Pittsburgh. It was officially opened in 2001.

The current facility in Friendship is LEED-certified. Its development has aided the growth of Garfield, especially with the adjacent Glass Lofts residential development.

In fall 2010, the Pittsburgh Glass Center entered into talks with Pittsburgh Filmmakers/Pittsburgh Center for the Arts. By May 2011, the talks had failed, with the Pittsburgh Glass Center withdrawing from negotiations.

In 2012, the Glass Center purchased residential housing adjacent to its main gallery space to be used as student and artist-in-residence housing.

By 2012, the center had a $1 million budget, with 10 full-time employees.
