= Sally Dixon =

American film curator (1932–2019)

- Born: Sally Foy; February 25, 1932; Seattle, Washington, US
- Died: November 5, 2019 (aged 87); St. Paul, Minnesota, US
- Other names: Sally Foy; Sally Dixon Block
- Occupations: Arts administrator, film curator, advocate
- Years active: 1960s–2019
- Known for: 1960s–1970s Avant-garde film
- Spouses: John Dixon; Ricardo Bloch
- Children: 3

Sally Foy Dixon (February 25, 1932 – November 5, 2019) was an American arts administrator, curator, and advocate of American experimental film and filmmakers. She was a Film Curator at Carnegie Museum of Art in Pittsburgh, Pennsylvania from 1970 to 1975 and interim director of Film in the Cities in Minneapolis, Minnesota, from 1978 to 1979. She also served as Director of the Bush Foundation for Artist Fellowships from 1980 to 1996 and was a consultant for the Pew Charitable Trusts, The MacArthur Foundation, the Herb Foundation, and the Leeway Foundation.

== Early life ==
Dixon was born in Seattle, Washington, to Fred C. Foy and Elizabeth Hamilton Foy. She was one of three children. Her father was Chief of Koppers Company in Pittsburgh, as well as chairman of the board of Trustees at Carnegie Mellon University and a Trustee of Carnegie Institute. Elizabeth Hamilton Foy was a member of the Women's Committee at Carnegie Institute.

Dixon studied art at Carnegie Institute of Technology (now Carnegie Mellon University), Bennington College, and Chatham College (now Chatham University).

== Career ==
In the 1960s, Dixon received a small hand-held movie camera from her father-in-law and began making films, which she later called "film poems." She became interested in learning about film. Influenced by Jonas Mekas' writing in The Village Voice, she became fascinated by avant-garde film. She was working at the Carnegie Museum of Art and after much discussion and research, started the museum's film department.

=== Carnegie Museum of Art ===
Dixon was the founding curator of the Film Section, later known as the Section of Film and Video and the Department of Film and Video, at Carnegie Museum of Art from 1970 to 1975. Dixon and Director Leon Arkus proposed a film program at the museum in 1969 and screenings began in 1970. They founded the program with the purpose of "promoting a greater understanding and appreciation of film as an art form and the filmmaker as an artist," and it was one of the first museum-based film programs in the country. It spurred film activity throughout the city and helped start other local film organizations such as Pittsburgh Filmmakers.

The Film Section specialized in American experimental film and featured lectures and screenings with artists such as Stan Brakhage, Hollis Frampton, Gunvor Nelson, Robert Breer, Willard Maas and Marie Menken, James Broughton, Joel Singer, Ken Jacobs, Peter Kubelka, Paul Sharits, George Kuchar, Mike Kuchar, Roger Jacoby, Bruce Baillie, Storm de Hirsch, and Joyce Weiland. Dixon premiered the program on April 1, 1970, with a lecture and screening by Lithuanian-American filmmaker Jonas Mekas.

While at Carnegie Museum of Art, Dixon also became heavily involved in the promotion of experimental film and filmmakers. Dixon and her crew featured several monthly series, including the History of Film Series and the Director's Series, both of which served as introductions to the medium. In 1973, she began the Film and Video Makers Travel Sheet (1973–1987), a monthly circular that CMOA distributed to alternative cinemas, museums, media centers, and universities across the country. It listed contact information and screening/lecture dates and locations for film and video makers. The Travel Sheet made it possible for filmmakers to book additional screenings and in-person presentations, which became primary sources of income, exposure, and dialogue for artists during this early period of new media's institutionalization. Later that year, she toured Europe as part of a United States Information Agency (USIA) funded program to showcase the arts. She toured with three films by artist Stan Brakhage: eyes (1971), Deus Ex (1971), and The Act of Seeing with One's Own Eyes (1971). Titled collectively the "Pittsburgh Trilogy," these films feature footage shot in Pittsburgh at various local institutions including the Pittsburgh Police and the University of Pittsburgh Medical Center (UPMC). She co-founded Pittsburgh Filmmakers in 1971, where she also served on the board, and established the Filmmakers Preview Network in 1975. Dixon left Carnegie Museum of Art in 1975, and William Judson, a film professor at the University of Pittsburgh, succeeded her as curator.

Dixon taught at the University of Colorado Boulder the next year until moving to Minnesota.

=== Minneapolis ===
In 1978, she moved to St. Paul, Minnesota, to become interim director for Film in the Cities (FITC), a media arts center that screened independent films and trained young artists and filmmakers. While she was there she created Filmmakers Filming, a screening and workshop series with the Film In The Cities accompanying booklets that was co-presented by the Walker Art Center.

In 1980, Dixon became the first director of the Bush Artist Fellowships at the Bush Foundation and supported artists from Minnesota, North Dakota and South Dakota in literature, visual arts, and performing arts.

== Personal life ==
Sally Dixon was married to engineer John Dixon. They lived in Pittsburgh and had three sons, John Dixon II, Steve Dixon and Alexander (Zander) Dixon. Alexander Dixon became an award-winning chef at his restaurant in St Paul, MN named Zander. Sally and John Dixon divorced and she married her second husband, physicist Ricardo Bloch, who later became a photographer. Dixon died on November 5, 2019.

== Filmography ==
- 1972: Dream Sphinx Opera by Roger Jacoby
- 1974: Aged in Wood by Roger Jacoby
- 1974: Roslyn Romance by Bruce Baillie
