= George Anastasios Magalios =

Canadian artist (born 1967)

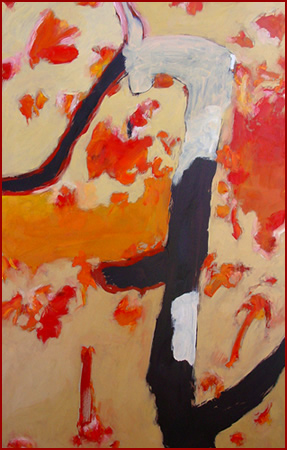
- The Fall Line, oil on wood, 2004, by George A. Magalios
- Born: George Anastasios Magalios; 1967 (age 58–59); Montreal, Quebec
- Education: Carnegie Mellon University in Pittsburgh
- Known for: multi-disciplinary visual artist
- Awards: Pittsburgh Center for the Arts Emerging Artist of the Year, 2003

George Anastasios Magalios (born in 1967) is a contemporary artist and philosopher, and the founder of George Magalios Studios. Magalios is a multi-disciplinary visual artist who makes works in fields such as painting, photography, sculpture, and performance art. Magalios is an unusual artist because of his use of unique names and identities for each body of work: George Magalios (The Fall Line painting series), Georges Ducharme (sculpture and installation art), Will Swinburne (performance art), Giorgio Fati (photography), and Jorge Griego (Energy Plan for the Florida Man painting series).

Magalios bases all of his work and thought on the ground palette, a concept and form he has developed from his research into pre-historic cave painting. The ground palette is both a philosophical foundation and an aesthetic way of thinking that attempts to distill language and ideas down to their essences. In articles and various websites, Magalios lists his influences as Led Zeppelin, Willie Mays, Tim Tebow and his parents, Virginia and Elias Magalios.

He has exhibited in exhibitions in New York, Pittsburgh, San Francisco, and other cities across North America as well as in Athens and across Europe and continues his practice today in West Palm Beach, Florida.

George Anastasios Magalios writes art theoretical works and art reviews of contemporary and modern art issues. He is a student of the philosophy of Martin Heidegger, Friedrich Nietzsche, and Jean Baudrillard and he incorporates much of the ideas of these thinkers in both his art and his writings. He has presented papers and the College Art Association conference in New York (2007) and at the Subtle Technologies Conference in Toronto (2002).

In addition to Montreal, Magalios has lived in Paris, San Francisco, New York, and Pittsburgh. Though he has lived in the United States for most of his life, the artist considers himself a Montrealer, albeit an exiled one.

Sometimes referring to himself as a "Site-Specific Philosopher", Magalios is known for his attempt to fuse an aesthetic practice with a personal one based on virtue, truth, and beauty.

== Montreal, 1967–1974 ==
Magalios was born in Montreal, Quebec, Canada. When Magalios was six years-old in 1973 he built a cave out of a mountain of snow in his backyard. This experience is considered by the artist to be a formative one and he has since called the work "Snow Womb" and has listed it in various biographies and lists of exhibitions. The artist remembers Montreal winters as being wombs of white and cold comforted by his mother's cooking and his visits to various Greek relatives. Raised in a Greek household, the artist grew up to speak English, Greek, and French and the cosmopolitan cultural environment proved to be a major influence on the artist's political and cultural outlook.

== West Palm Beach, 1974–1986 ==
When Magalios was 7 years-old his family moved to West Palm Beach, Florida. The shift from rich and colorful Montreal to provincial South Florida proved to be a dramatic one. The artist's father signed him up for little league baseball as a way to get initiated into American culture and this game would prove to be a formative experience in his relationship to the United States. Around the age of 8 Magalios's mother had him take painting lessons for the first time. The artist was told by the teacher, an established painter of portraits, that he should "stick to baseball" since his art skills were "limited at best". The artist first remembers painting a clown portrait based on a magazine photo. During his youth, the artist developed a reputation for pranks and athletic prowess on the baseball diamond.

Around the age of 12 the artist is said to have begun a serious study of the music of Led Zeppelin, a band Magalios often lists as an influence on his work to this day. Soon after George A. Magalios discovered the work of Vincent Van Gogh when his mother bought him his first art book, a retrospective of the painter's work that the artist is said to still own and refer to for inspiration today.

At Cardinal Newman High School Magalios hovered between athlete and artist and developed a reputation that defied easy classification because of his ability to hit a fastball 400 feet and appreciate the nuances of The Smiths, The Church, R.E.M. and Echo and the Bunnymen.

== Gainesville, 1986–1989 ==
Upon graduating from high school Magalios attended the University of Florida where he began to study political theory and art history. It was during this time in Gainesville that he began to paint more seriously as he undertook a series of oils on canvas depicting the chromatic tendencies of the human face as it responded to various emotional stimuli. It is believed that only three of these paintings are extant. It was at the University of Florida where Magalios first developed a reputation as a developing painter and ardent defender of the sublime in art.

== Montreal, 1989–1992 ==
In 1988, while still at the University of Florida, Magalios decided to move back to his native Montreal and take a year-long break from studies. Arriving in 1989 Magalios began a series of black and white semi-figurative paintings on masonite panels and ink drawings on paper. None of the paintings are believed to be still in existence as the artist has never mentioned them in any of his lists of works.

In 1990, Magalios painted the first, of what would continue to be his most important series of Autumn-themed paintings. The work was a red-orange series of "leaves" on multiple 2x4 studs of wood that were individually screwed into a wall to become both a sculptural and painterly work.

In 1991 Magalios began site-specific installations that consisted of assemblages of street trash from his Plateau Mont-Royal neighborhood. The assemblages would take the form of traditional Hindu Siva-Sakti lingam sculptures. This return to sculpture was inspired, in part, by a sense of existential homecoming the artist felt after living away from Montreal for 15 years. It was during the same year that the artist returned to complete his bachelor's degree at Concordia University. While there he was introduced to the work of Friedrich Nietzsche and Jean Baudrillard, two thinkers who would play a strong role in forming Magalios's vision of the world that combined a penchant for a critical approach to perception and politics with an affirmation of the light and darkness of living.

== San Francisco, 1992–1997 ==
In 1992 Magalios moved to San Francisco and was instantly influenced by the dramatic landscapes of the Pacific Coast and the Sierra Nevada, as well as by the atmosphere of kindness, friendship, and creativity in the Bay area. During this period he devoted himself almost exclusively to a series of guerilla site-specific installation works in both rural and urban settings. The works were often ephemeral in nature and largely influenced by artists such as Richard Long and Andy Goldsworthy. He also continued experimenting with a series of paintings on cardboard and canvas that explored a minimal use of painterly brush strokes in the earth colors of the ground palette.

In 1993 George Magalios enrolled in the Master's program of the Interdisciplinary Humanities Department at San Francisco State University. He would write his thesis on the views of art and technology held by Joseph Beuys and Martin Heidegger. The thesis, entitled "Site-Specific Philosophy", was an attempt to craft a philosophical way of thinking and living using the paradigms of installation-based sculpture. The thesis was well received and continues to be a foundation for much of the artist's writings.

== New York, 1997–1998 ==
After receiving his master's degree Magalios moved to New York in 1998 to pursue a PhD in cultural theory at the New School for Social Research. He dropped out during the first day of classes after experiencing an epiphany on the streets of Greenwich Village. The vision was one of a life of art-making instead of a life of teaching and writing about art. It would prove to be a life-altering moment that allowed Magalios to fully embrace the art practice fully as a way of life rather than a way of theory.

New York would also prove to be an important home for George Magalios as he often mentions the importance of seeing so many important exhibitions and works by his heroes first hand. The Robert Rauschenberg retrospective at the Guggenheim Museum in 1997 and the Matisse collection at the Museum of Modern art are two examples frequently cited as poignant discoveries.

== Pittsburgh, 1998–2005 ==
In 1998 George A. Magalios began studies in the MFA program at Carnegie Mellon University’s School of Art, upon a recommendation from Arthur Kroker, a former professor at Concordia University. While at Carnegie Mellon he met Bill Kofmehl and began a series of performance and installation works that explored concepts such as hunting, nature, and technology's influence on perception.

It was in Pittsburgh where the artist further refined The Fall Line series of paintings and completed a separate, yet related, group of works called "Ground Palette Details", that were pictorial riffs of the ground palette form. The time in Pittsburgh was filled with wild experimentation for George Magalios. It included forays into video art, digital media, and stand-up comedy.

== Lake Worth, 2006-2020 ==
In 2006 George Magalios began a 14-year sabbatical and research and development stay in Lake Worth, FL. This period saw the artist participate in and attend several exhibitions, performances, and other events within and around the temporary art world. It was in this time, during his research into the particle physics of transcendental aesthetics that he began collecting work by other artists.

As part of this sabbatical, Magalios built a darkroom with equipment purchased from Jerome Rubin, a prominent photographer in Delray Beach, Florida. This darkroom would be the foundation for George Magalios's experiments in black and white film photography and printing techniques ranging from the use of contact prints for negative/positive photos to utilizing filters in unconventional ways to create extremely high contrast photographs that gave the figures in the works the appearance of marble sculptures from ancient Greece.
