= Pittsburgh Center for the Arts =

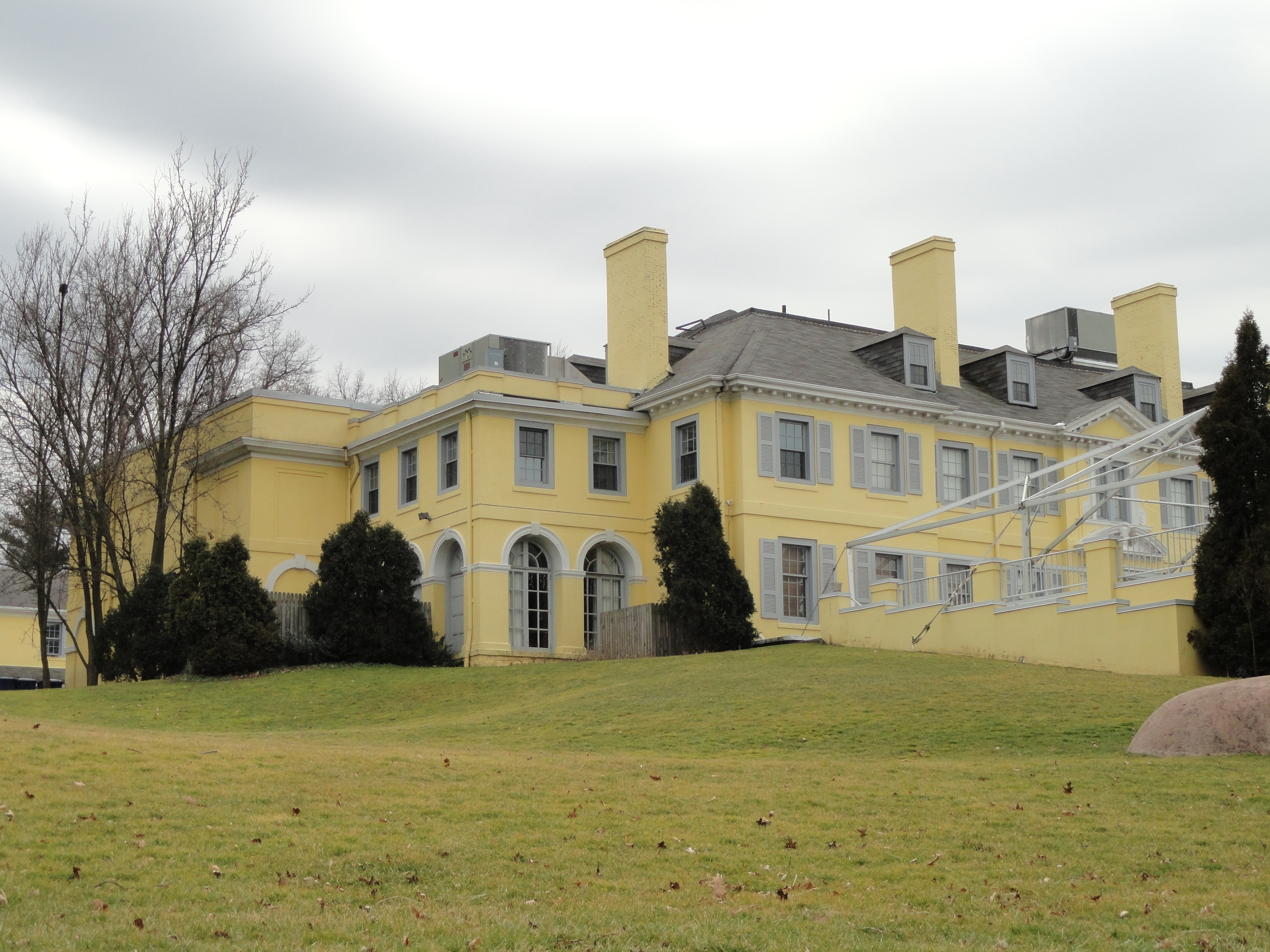

- Location within Pittsburgh
- Former name: Pittsburgh Arts and Crafts Center
- Established: 1945; 81 years ago
- Location: Pittsburgh
- Coordinates: 40.452406°N 79.920133°W
- Website: http://center.pfpca.org/

Pittsburgh Landmark – PHLF
- Designated: 1971

The Pittsburgh Center for the Arts (PCA) is a non-profit community arts campus that offers arts education programs and contemporary art exhibitions in Pittsburgh, Pennsylvania, United States.

It also provides services and resources for artists throughout Western Pennsylvania. PCA provides a venue for the community to create, see, support, and learn about visual arts. Founded in 1945, PCA is located at 6300 Fifth Avenue in the Shadyside neighborhood. Though, according to the City of Pittsburgh Map, the center is located in the Point Breeze neighborhood.

Pop artist Keith Haring had his first exhibition at the Pittsburgh Arts and Crafts Center in 1978 before moving to New York City and becoming one of the most prolific artists of the late 20th century.

== History ==
=== Founding ===
The PCA's opened on March 17, 1945, as the "Arts and Craft Center" at Fifth and Shady Avenues. Almost 1000 Pittsburghers gathered at the opening night ceremonies, headed by Mayor Cornelius D. Scully, J. Bailey Ellis, who was named chairman of the Center, and Mrs. Charles D. Marshall, who publicly turned the key to her home over to the city.

Ten artist groups comprised the center at its founding:

- Pittsburgh Drama League (founded 1913)
- Pennsylvania Guild of Craftsmen (founded 1944)
- Weavers Guild of Pittsburgh (founded 1940)
- Society of Sculptors (founded 1934)
- Pittsburgh Civic Ballet (founded 1941)
- Abstract Artists Group of Pittsburgh
- Musician's Club of Pittsburgh (founded 1913)
- Associated Artists of Pittsburgh (founded 1910)
- Contemporary Dance Group
- Authors’ Club (founded 1918).

The first program after the grand opening was a musicale given by the Musician's Club on March 25, 1945. Each of the ten groups was responsible for holding five programs open to the public each year. The first Christmas Bazaar was held in November 1946, and continues today as the Holiday Sale.

The organization was chartered in July 1947. The first annual meeting to which all members of the various artist groups were invited was held on January 12, 1948. The newly revised by-laws were read and accepted. The elected board and officers were unpaid.

The center's dedication to improving the overall quality of life in Pittsburgh through education has been an essential part of its philosophy from the beginning. The first mention of classes appeared in the minutes of the June 1947 board meeting. University of Pittsburgh professor Walter Hovey, then president of the Pennsylvania Guild of Craftsmen, asked for the use of the kitchen in order to hold a jewelry class for some 40 students.

In addition to education, the center has always sought to promote regional art. In 1948, the first Everyman's Art Show was held, open to the region's amateurs. The first Artist of the Year show was held in January 1949, honoring painter Balcombe Greene. In the April 1954, the Center went on the air on WQED-TV with the weekly, half-hour series You, the Artists hosted by sculptor Everett Sturgeon. From 1981 to 1989, the center renewed its relationship with WQED with the weekly Lyceum (later Studio 13,) hosted by Mary Rawson. Ongoing attempts were made in print as well, starting from the earliest days with a mimeographed newsletter, Musings, from 1975-79 with Quidnunc, and later in expanded course catalogs and the quarterly Art Lines.

=== Reorganizing ===
Eventually, volunteers could not keep abreast of an increasingly complex artistic and organizational environment. By the late 1960s, the center's administration resembled “an octopus without a head,” according to the Pittsburgh Press's Patricia Lowry. Artist Danny Butts was engaged as the center's first full-time director. He was succeeded by businessman Jerrold Rouby in 1970. Additional paid positions were added then: an education director and sales director. The Center's classes and enrollment expanded during Rouby's tenure.

In 1975, Audrey Bethel became the center's director. Under her leadership, the groundwork was laid for many changes. Nationally known artists visited the center, the board of directors was restructured, and the center's name was changed. Cheryl Towers became director in 1981, and later hired ceramicist Sande Deitch as full-time exhibitions director. Deitch became director of the Center in 1987; Murray Horne became exhibitions director.

=== Post-1990s ===
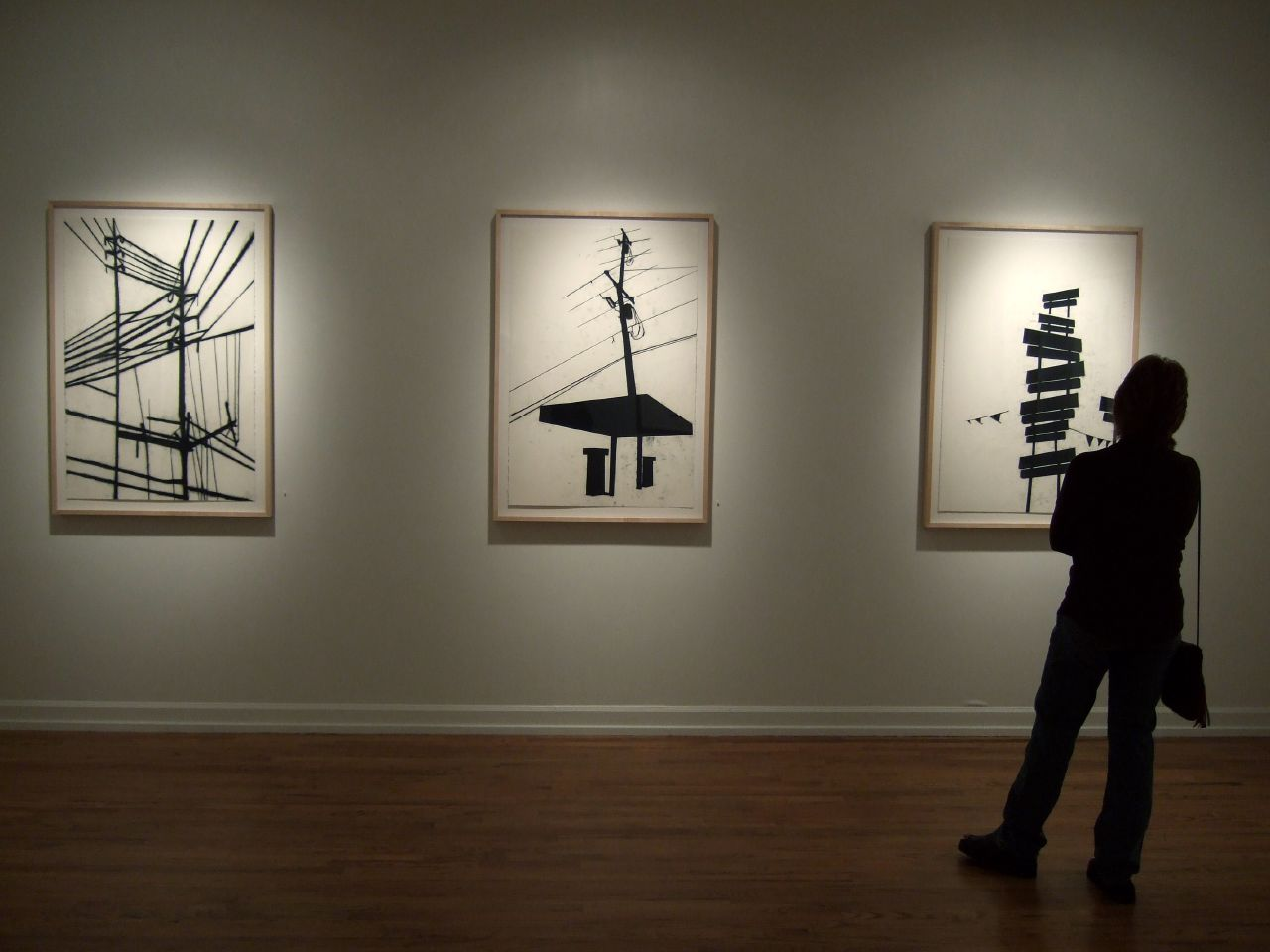
Kim Beck, Pittsburgh Center of the Arts Emerging Artist 2006 Charcoal on paper

For the center, the late 1990s were marked with ambitious programs, but also financial difficulty. In February 2002, five staff—including Executive Director Laura Willumsen and Curator Vicky Clark—were laid off and the exhibitions department eliminated. In August 2004, 13 staff members were laid off. The center was approximately $1 million in debt, and its doors were closed.

The center has offered special prizes of Artist of the Year and Emerging Artist of the Year, along with its Biennial exhibitions of local contemporary artists. Previous winners of prizes include Delanie Jenkins, Clayton Merrill, and George Anastasios Magalios.

In September 2004, Charlie Humphrey became the unpaid interim director of PCA. The center reopened, after having been closed only for a few weeks. In relatively short order, missed payments to artists were rectified and relationships with foundations were repaired.

In January 2006, following votes by the Pittsburgh Filmmakers membership, Pittsburgh Center for the Arts board and Pittsburgh Filmmakers board, the merger of the two organizations became final. The Pittsburgh Filmmakers by-laws were carried over as the by-laws of the merged organization.

In Fall 2010, the combined Pittsburgh Filmmakers/Pittsburgh Center for the Arts entered into merger discussions with the Pittsburgh Glass Center. By May 2011, the talks had failed, with the Pittsburgh Glass Center withdrawing from negotiations.

== Facilities ==
Throughout the years many renovations were made at both the Marshall building, which houses the galleries, and the Scaife building, which houses the school. The last major renovation was to the Marshall building, which reopened March 24, 1990 with a dedication by Mayor Sophie Masloff to 800 guests, including Jane Marshall Fisher, granddaughter of the building's original donor.

The center has a campus arrangement of four buildings, three of which (two mansions and a carriage house) are rented from the city for $1.00 per year. The fourth structure houses newly built kilns.

== PCA buildings ==
For the industrialists in the early 1900s, a major living area was Pittsburgh's East End, where a building boom was underway. A parade of mansions were commissioned along Fifth Avenue to what became known as “Millionaires Row” for some of the wealthiest and most celebrated families in Pittsburgh, such as the Mellons, the Benedums, and the Fricks.

In 1909, one of the most impressive mansions built was the 65-room Richard Beatty Mellon House on the 11 acres (4.5 ha) of land bordering Fifth Avenue, Shady Avenue and Beechwood Boulevard on what is now known as Mellon Park. Richard Beatty Mellon and his wife Jennie King Mellon raised two children, Sarah Cordelia King Mellon and Richard King Mellon. Jennie King Mellon had a love for flowers and had two very large flower gardens facing Beechwood Boulevard, which still exists in Mellon Park today. Next to the mansion was a garage and carriage house, which housed servants on the second floor. This carriage house was donated to the City and is now the Phipps Garden Center. The 65-room mansion was torn down in 1941.

In 1904, there was another earlier Tudor revival mansion built on the Mellon Estate. It was given as a wedding gift in 1927 to Richard Beatty's daughter Sarah, who married Alan Magee Scaife, fifth generation industrialist and the Director of Mellon National Bank. In February 1946, the Scaifes also donated their home and property to the City. This mansion is now the Scaife Building that houses the Pittsburgh Center for the Arts School.

Next door to the Mellon Estate, on the corner of Fifth and Shady Avenues, Charles D. Marshall, president and co-owner of the McClintic-Marshall Construction Company, which later became Bethlehem Steel, built his mansion. Completed in 1912, the Marshall mansion was an impressive formal 17th-Century Carolean-inspired building. In 1943, Charles Marshall also donated his house at 6300 Fifth Avenue to the city. The city was responsible for only the exterior maintenance. The Marshall mansion became the Arts and Crafts Center of Pittsburgh in 1945. In 1980, the name was again changed to what is now known as the Pittsburgh Center for the Arts.
