= Carnegie Museum of Art =

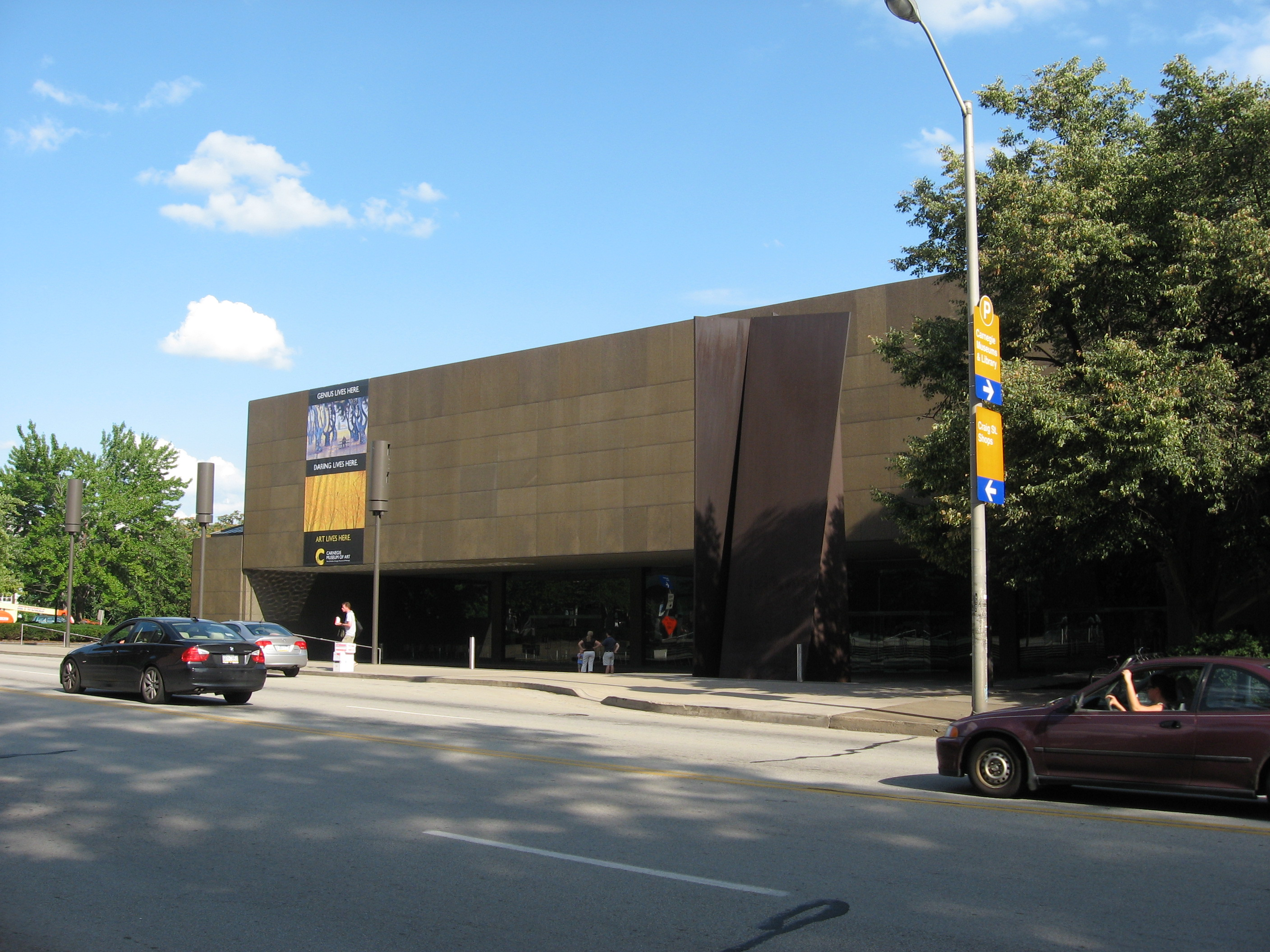
- Exterior view of the Sarah Mellon Scaife Gallery
- Interactive fullscreen map
- Former name: Department of Fine Arts, Carnegie Institute
- Established: November 5, 1895
- Location: 4400 Forbes Ave, Pittsburgh, Pennsylvania 15213
- Coordinates: 40.443690°N 79.948976°W
- Type: Art museum
- Accreditation: American Alliance of Museums
- Director: Eric Crosby
- Parking: On site and street
- Website: carnegieart.org

The Carnegie Museum of Art is an art museum in the Oakland neighborhood of Pittsburgh, Pennsylvania, United States. The museum was originally known as the Department of Fine Arts, Carnegie Institute and was located at what became the Main Branch of the Carnegie Library of Pittsburgh. The museum's first gallery was opened for public viewing on November 5, 1895. Over the years, the gallery vastly increased in size, with a new building on Forbes Avenue built in 1907. In 1963, the name was officially changed to Museum of Art, Carnegie Institute. The size of the gallery has tripled over time, and it was officially renamed in 1986 to "Carnegie Museum of Art" to indicate it clearly as one of the four Carnegie Museums.

== History ==
Andrew Carnegie first thought of setting up a museum in 1886 that would preserve a "record of the progress and development of pictorial art in America." Dedicated on November 5, 1895, the art gallery was initially housed in the Carnegie Library of Pittsburgh's Main Branch in Oakland.

Carnegie initially envisioned a museum collection consisting of the "Old Masters of tomorrow". The museum received a major expansion in 1907 with the addition of the Hall of Architecture, Hall of Sculpture, and Bruce Galleries, with funds again provided by Carnegie.

Under the directorship of Leon A. Arkus, the Sarah Mellon Scaife Gallery (125,000 square feet) was built as an addition to the existing Carnegie Institute. Designed by architect Edward Larrabee Barnes, it first opened in 1974 and more than doubled the museum's exhibition space, also adding a children's studio, theater, café, offices, and bookstore. The New York Times art critic John Russell described the gallery as an "unflawed paradise." The gallery has been renovated several times since its original creation, most recently in 2004.

Today the museum also stages the Carnegie International every few years. Numerous significant works from the Internationals have been acquired for museum's permanent collection including Winslow Homer's The Wreck (1896) and James A. McNeill Whistler's Arrangement in Black: Portrait of Señor Pablo de Sarasate (1884). The latest iteration of the Carnegie International opened in May of 2026.

== Collections and departments ==
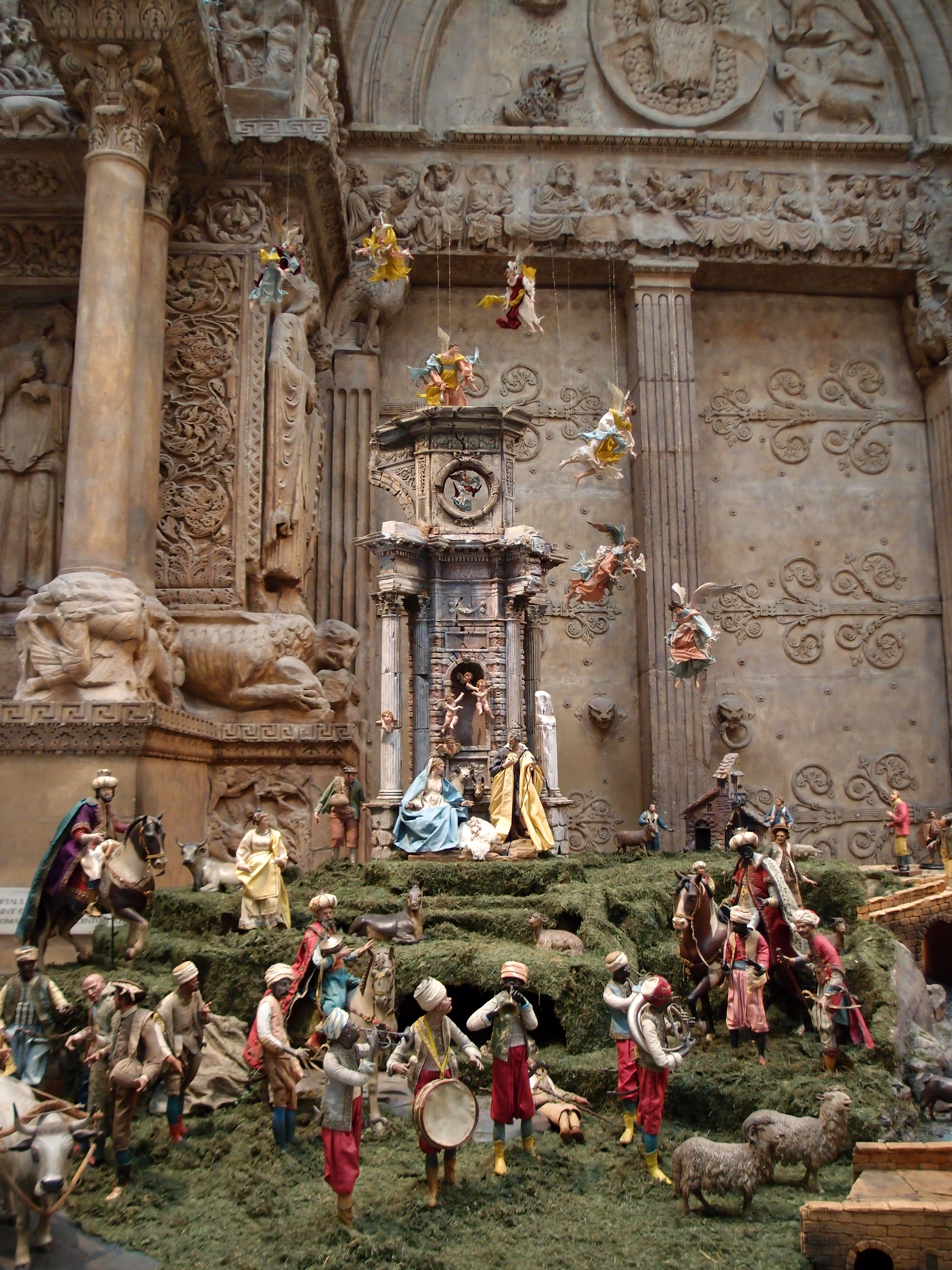
Neapolitan presepio seasonally displayed at the Carnegie Museum of Art

The museum's curatorial departments include: Fine Arts (Contemporary Art, Works on Paper), Decorative Arts, Architecture and Photography. Every year, the museum hosts up to 15 different exhibitions. Approximately 35,000 pieces make up its permanent collection, which also includes works on paper, paintings, prints (particularly Japanese prints), sculptures, and installations from the late seventeenth century to the present. The museum has collections of both aluminum relics and chairs. Approximately 1,800 works are on view at any given time.

The museum maintains a large archive of negatives from African American photographer and Pittsburgh native Charles "Teenie" Harris.

Heinz Architectural Center - The collection includes works in architecture, landscape design, engineering, and furniture and interior design. The center's facilities includes 4,000 square feet of exhibition space and a library housing several thousand books and journals.

The Hillman Photography Initiative - The Initiative hosts a variety of projects including live public events, web-based projects, documentary videos, art projects, and writing. Yearly programming is determine by a group of five "agents" who plan and curate each 12-month cycle of works hosted.

Collection Themes

- Contemporary Glass
- Teenie Harris Photographs: Erroll Garner and Jazz from the Hill
- Carnegie International
- Japanese Prints
- Pittsburgh Artists
- The Art of the Chair
- Pictorialist Photography
- Painting and Sculpture 1860–1920
- W. Eugene Smith

== Galleries ==
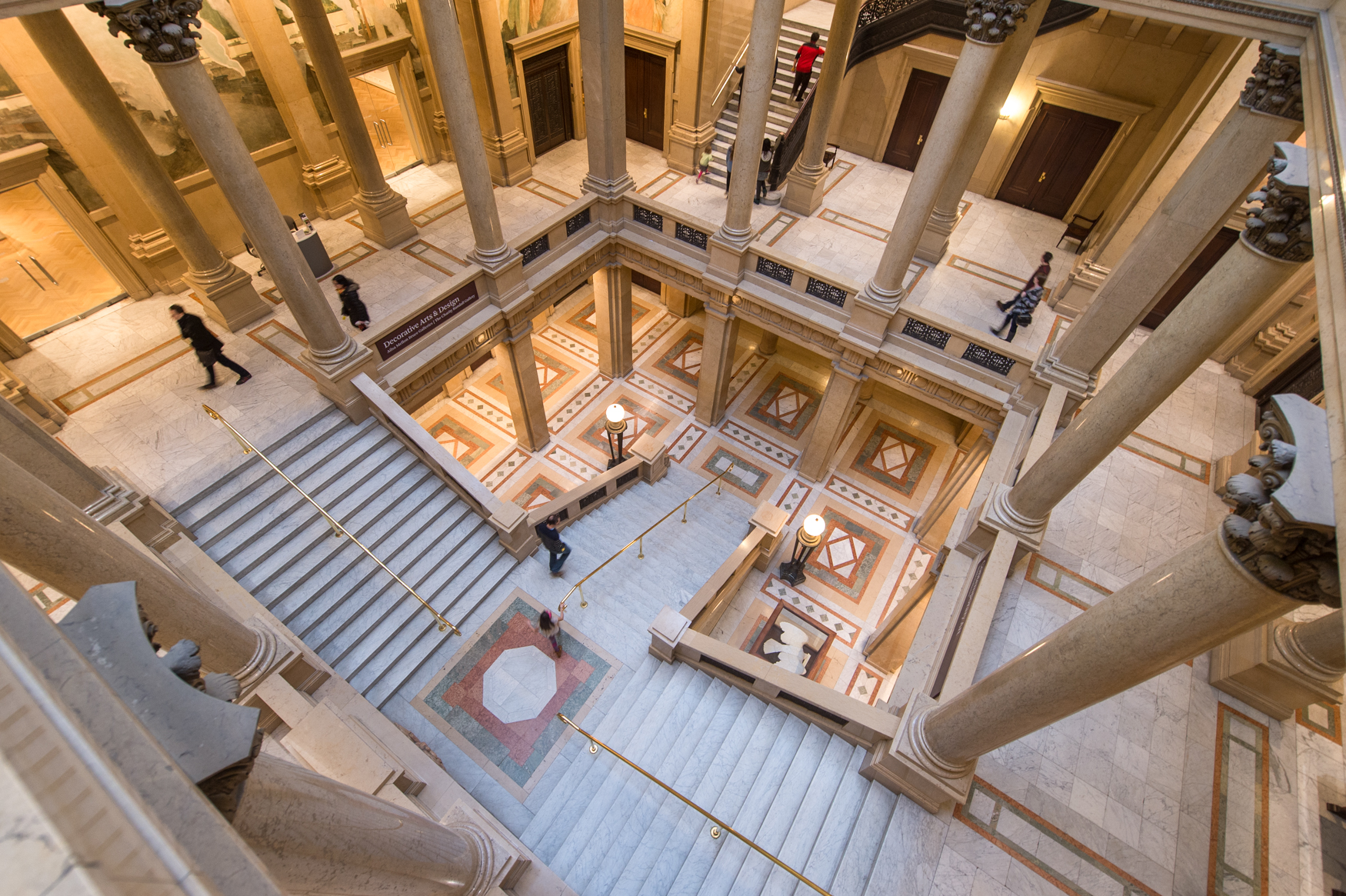
The 1907 Grand Staircase

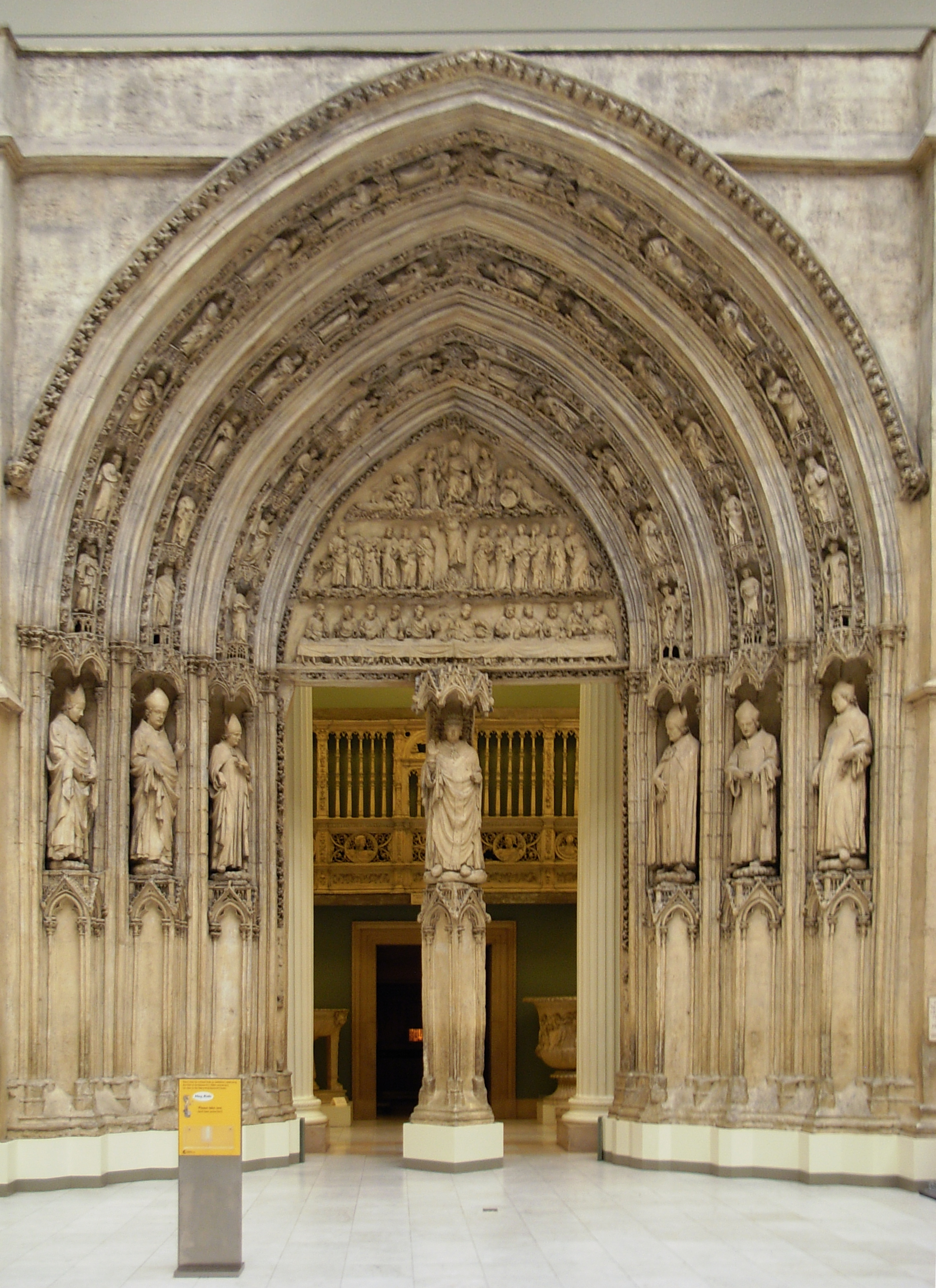
Cast of the north transept portal of the Bordeaux Cathedral in the Hall of Architecture

- Ailsa Mellon Bruce Galleries (1907) – The Ailsa Mellon Bruce Galleries were originally constructed to display reproduction bronze casts from Pompeii and Herculaneum. The gallery was renovated in 2009, and currently exhibits more than 500 objects representing American and European decorative arts from the Rococo and Neoclassical periods of the 18th century to contemporary design and craft.
- Hall of Architecture (1907) – The Hall of Architecture houses almost 140 full-size plaster casts of elements of buildings found in the ancient and classical civilizations of Egypt, Greece and Rome, and from Romanesque, Gothic and Renaissance Europe. It is the largest collection of plaster casts of architectural masterpieces in America and one of the three largest in the world, along with those of the Victoria and Albert Museum in London and the Musée national des Monuments Français in Paris.
- Hall of Sculpture (1907) – The Hall of Sculpture was modeled after the Parthenon's inner sanctuary and was originally created to house the museum's 69 plaster casts of Egyptian, Near Eastern, Greek, and Roman sculpture. Today it exhibits works from the permanent collections, with its balcony displaying decorative arts objects from the eighteenth to the twentieth century.
- Heinz Architectural Center (1993) – dedicated to the collection, study, and exhibition of architectural drawings and models.
- Scaife Galleries (1974) – The Scaife Galleries display the permanent collection of the museum, and contains paintings, sculptures, works on paper, film, and video pieces.
- Forum Gallery – Located on the first floor of the museum just inside the Forbes Avenue entrance, this single room is dedicated to temporary exhibitions of contemporary art. It opened November 3, 1990, with support from the National Endowment of the Arts – The first exhibition, Forum 1, was a solo show of Jeff Wall. Subsequent exhibitions were numbered sequentially (for example, Forum 40 featured Felix de la Concha). Unlike larger museum exhibitions, which can take up to three years to plan and execute, Forum shows come together relatively quickly, and are open to any curatorial staff's vision. In the words of Vicky Clark, a longtime curator at the museum, "The idea was to make sure that we had an exhibition of contemporary art set up at all times."

== Educational programs ==
Saturday art classes in the galleries of the Carnegie Museum of Art have been conducted for over 75 years. Alumni of the program include Andy Warhol, photographer Duane Michals, and contemporary artist Philip Pearlstein. The museum has classes specific to various age groups.

== Looted art controversy ==
In 2023 the Manhattan District Attorney seized a drawing by Egon Schiele entitled Portrait of a Man within the framework of a criminal investigation concerning the Nazi-era looting of the collection of Fritz Grunbäum, who was murdered in the Holocaust.

== Gallery ==
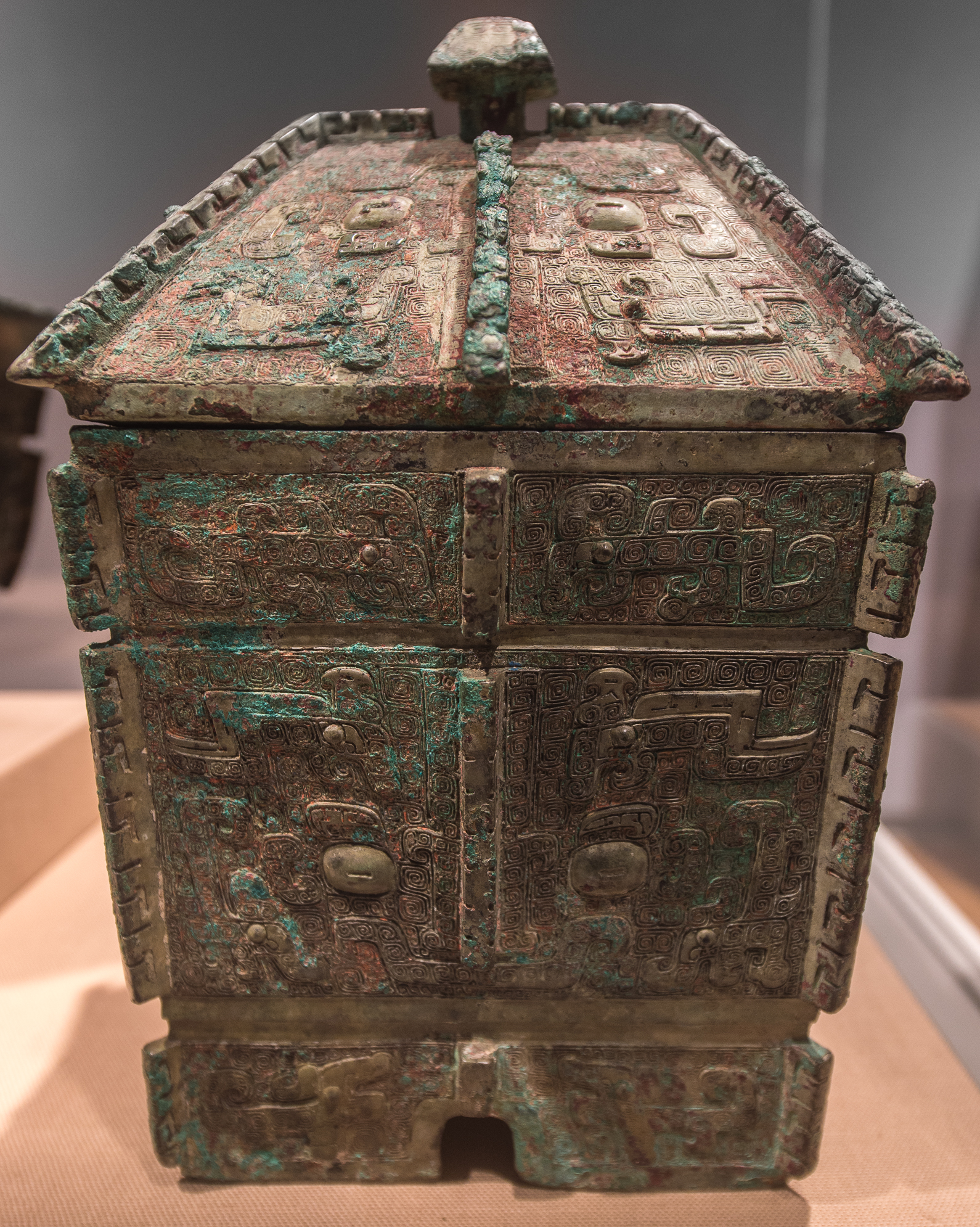
Bronze ritualistic vessel, 1300–1150 BCE, Shang dynasty, China

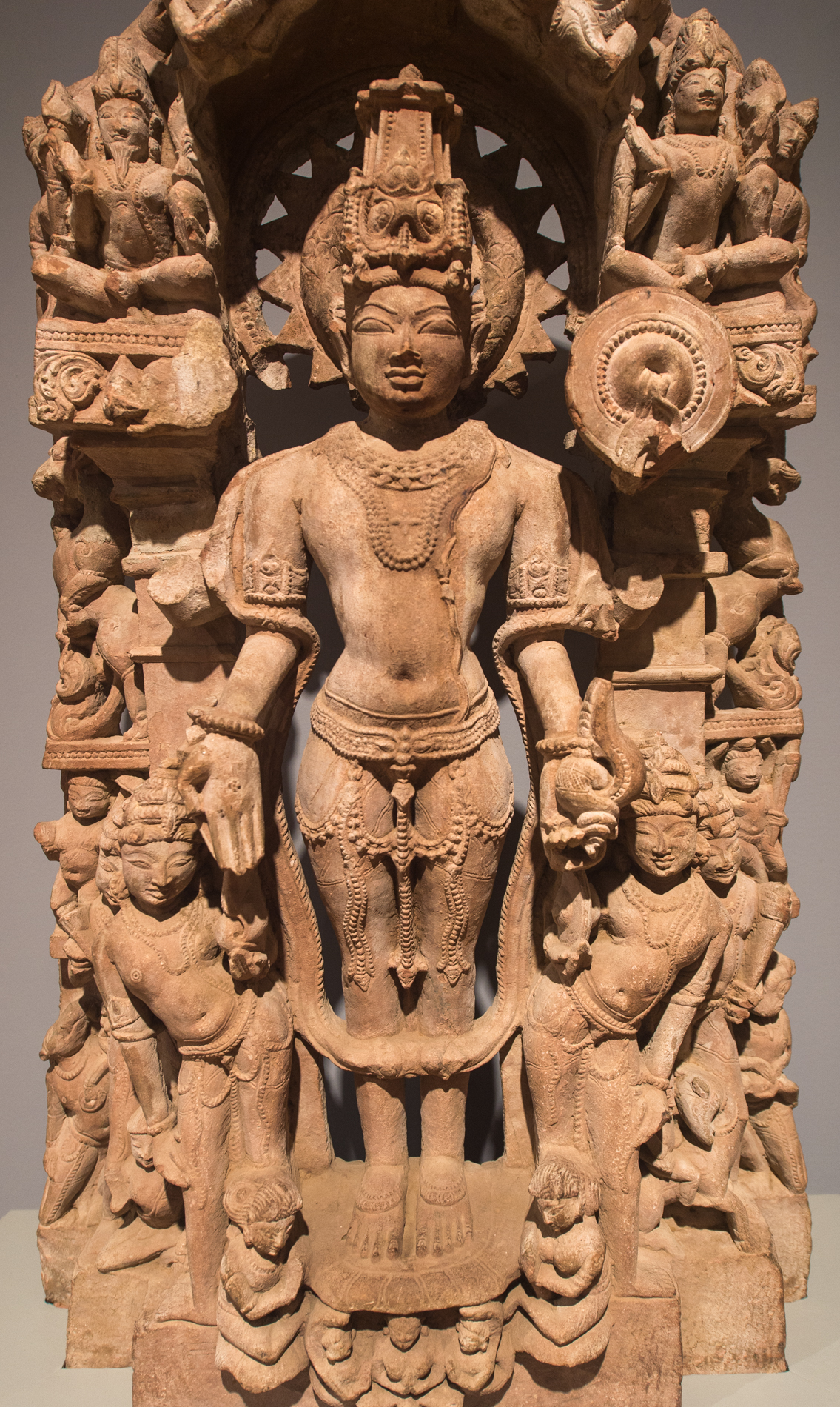
Stele of Vishnu with Avatars and attendant deities, 12th century, central India

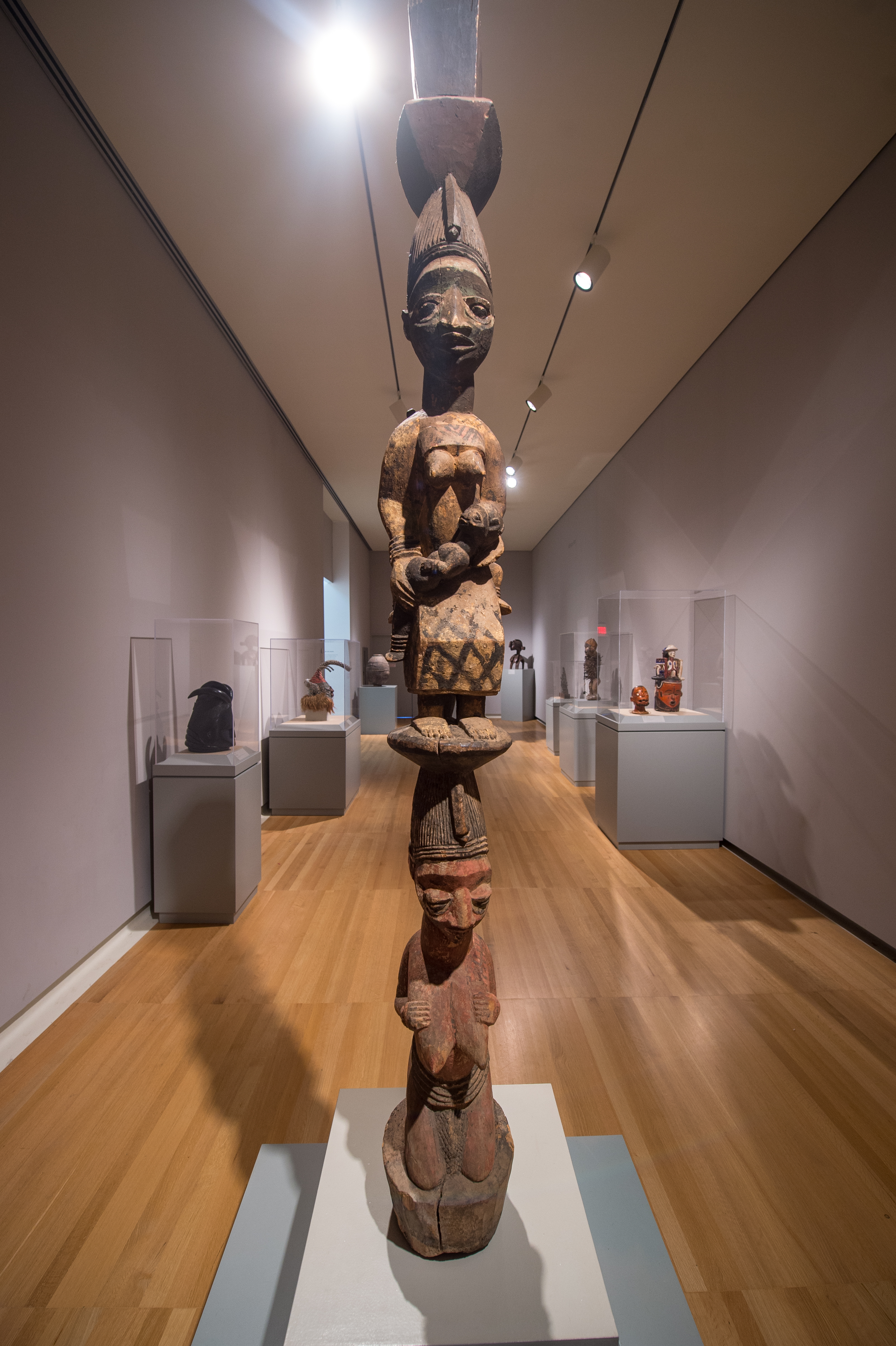
Housepost, c. 1930s, Yoruba culture, Africa

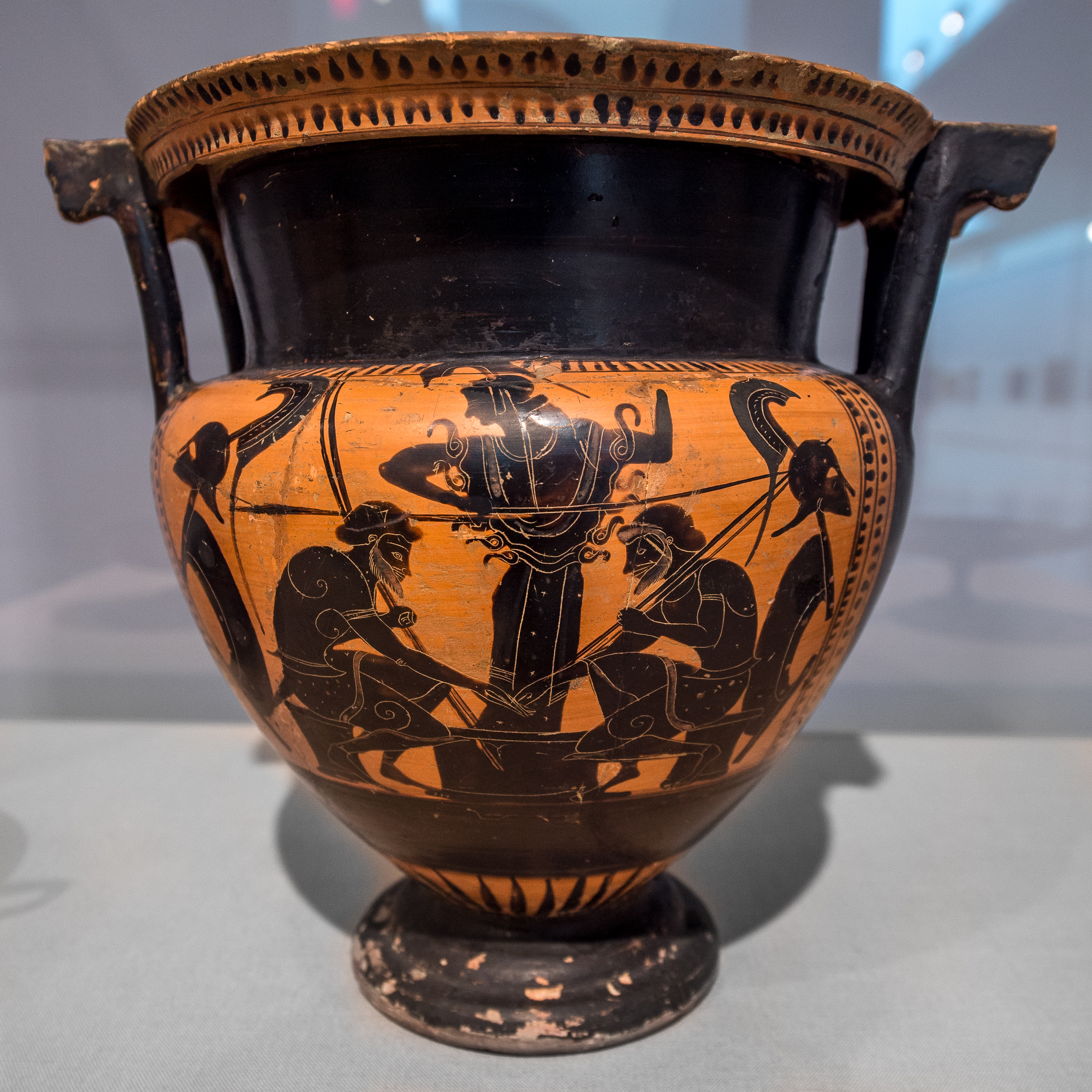
Ancient Greco-Roman vase

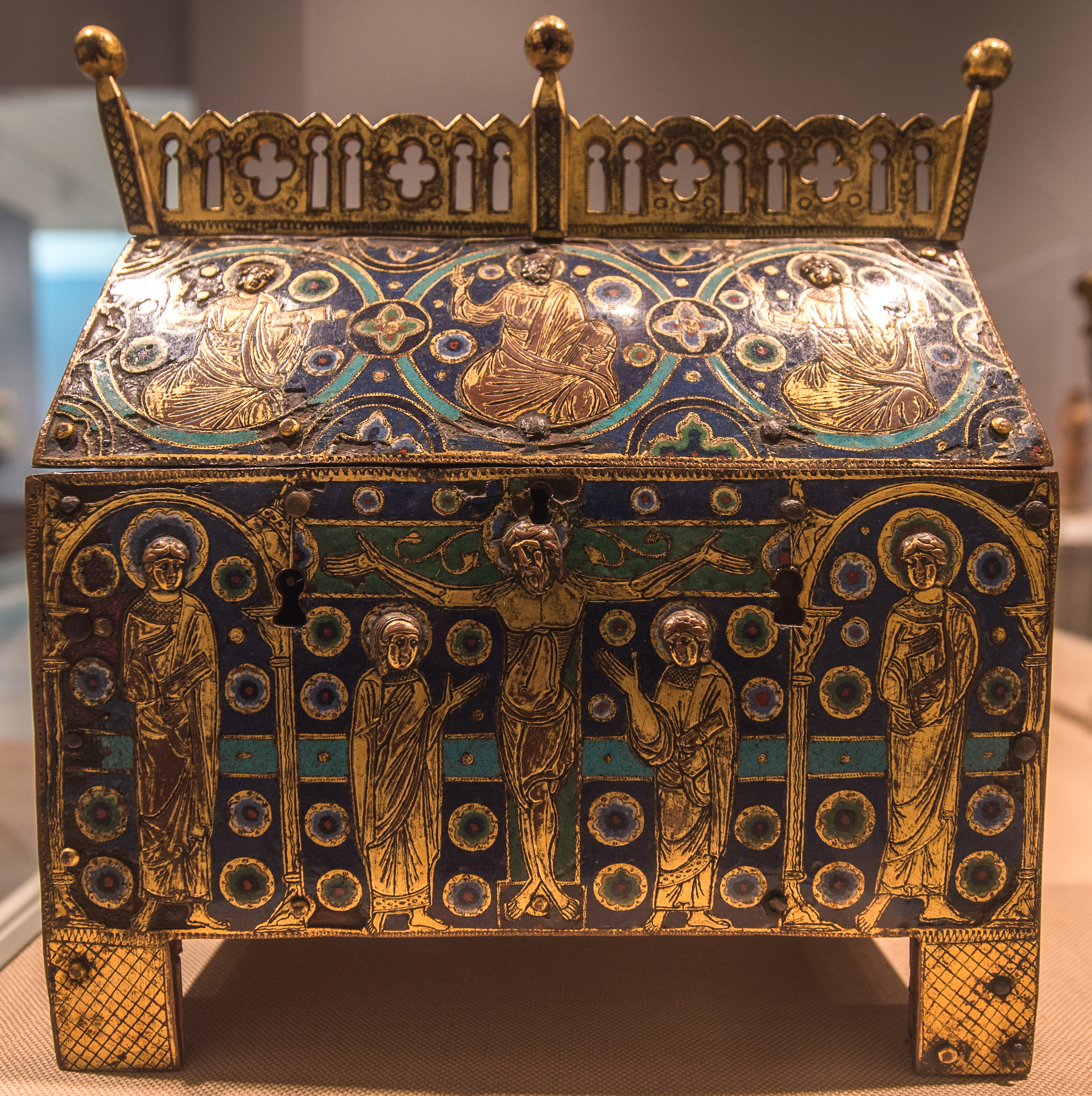
Casket for relics of a saint (châsse), 13th century, French

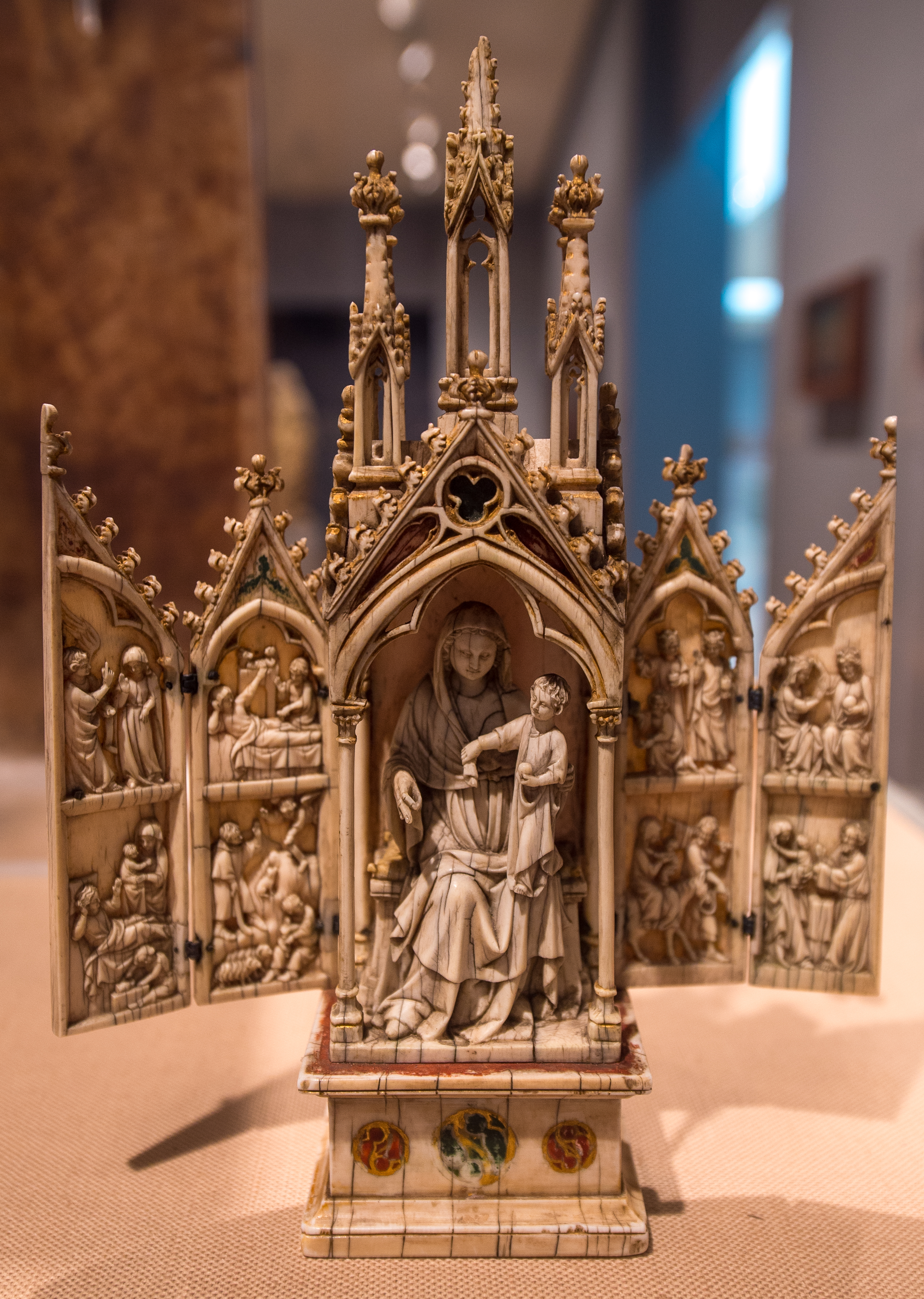
Ivory portable altar, 14th century, French

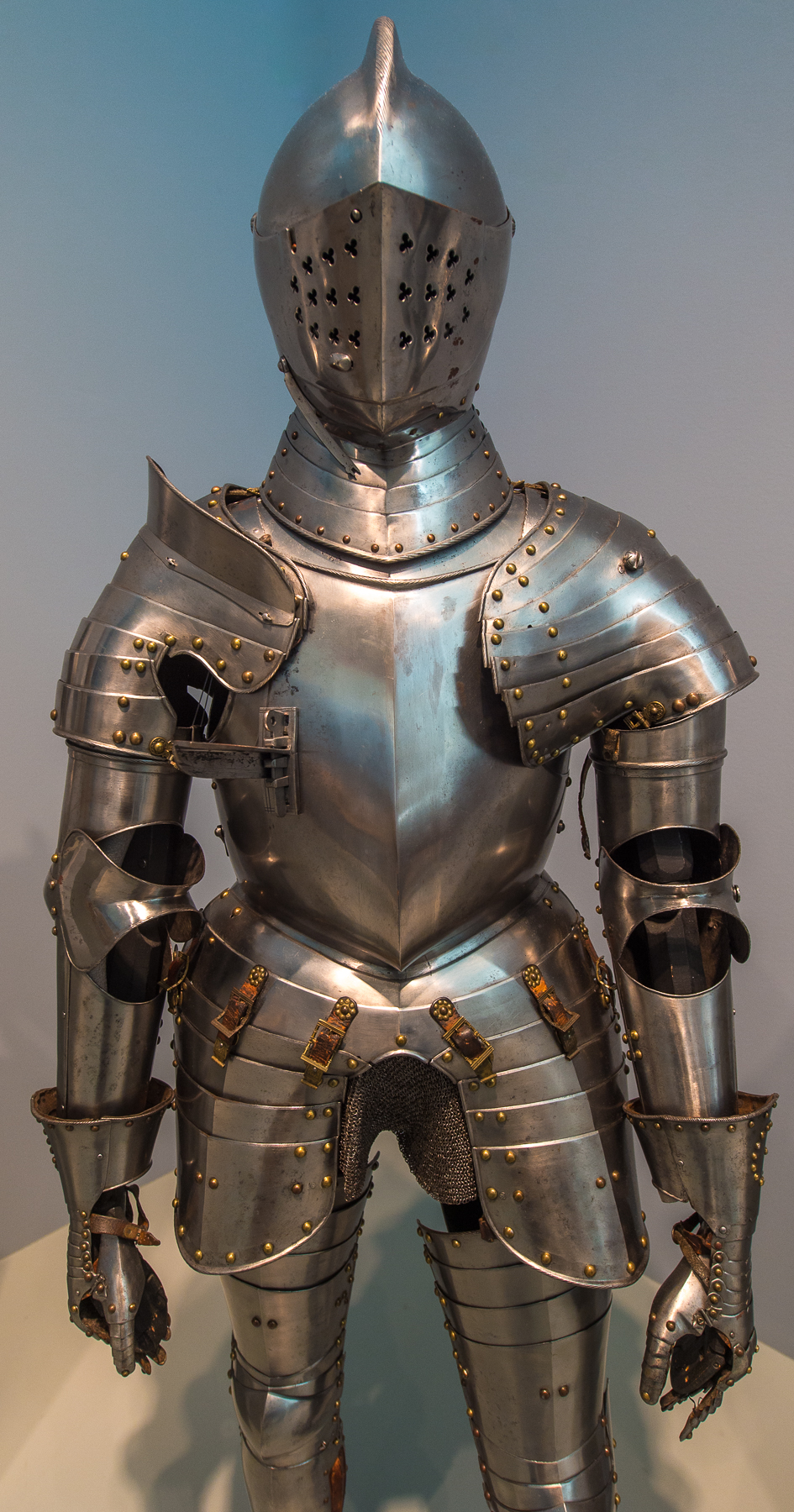
Armour, with Helmet, c. 1555, by Anton Peffenhauser

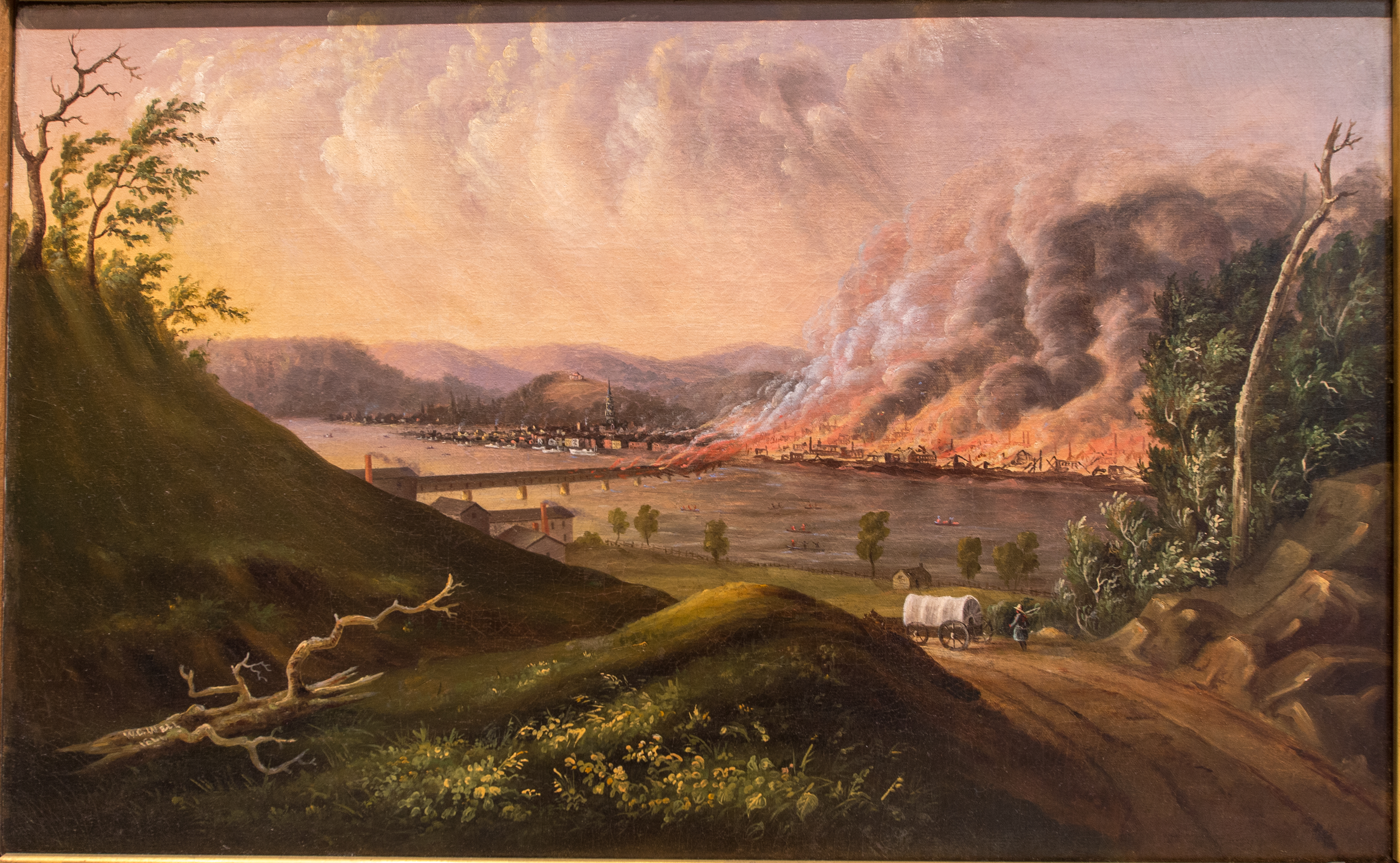
View of the Great Fire of Pittsburgh, 1846, oil on canvas, by William Coventry Wall

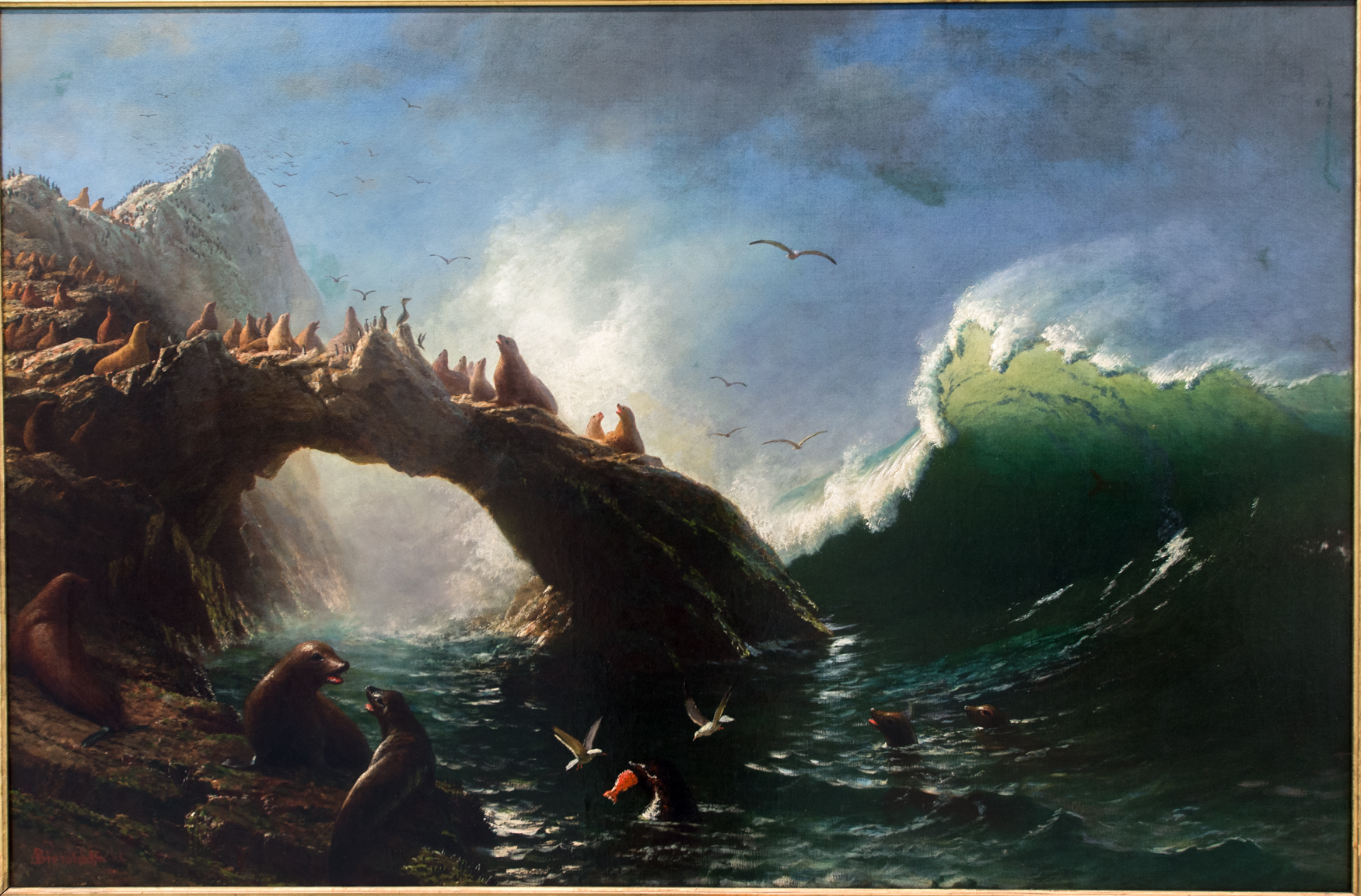
Farallon Island, 1887, oil on canvas, by Albert Bierstadt

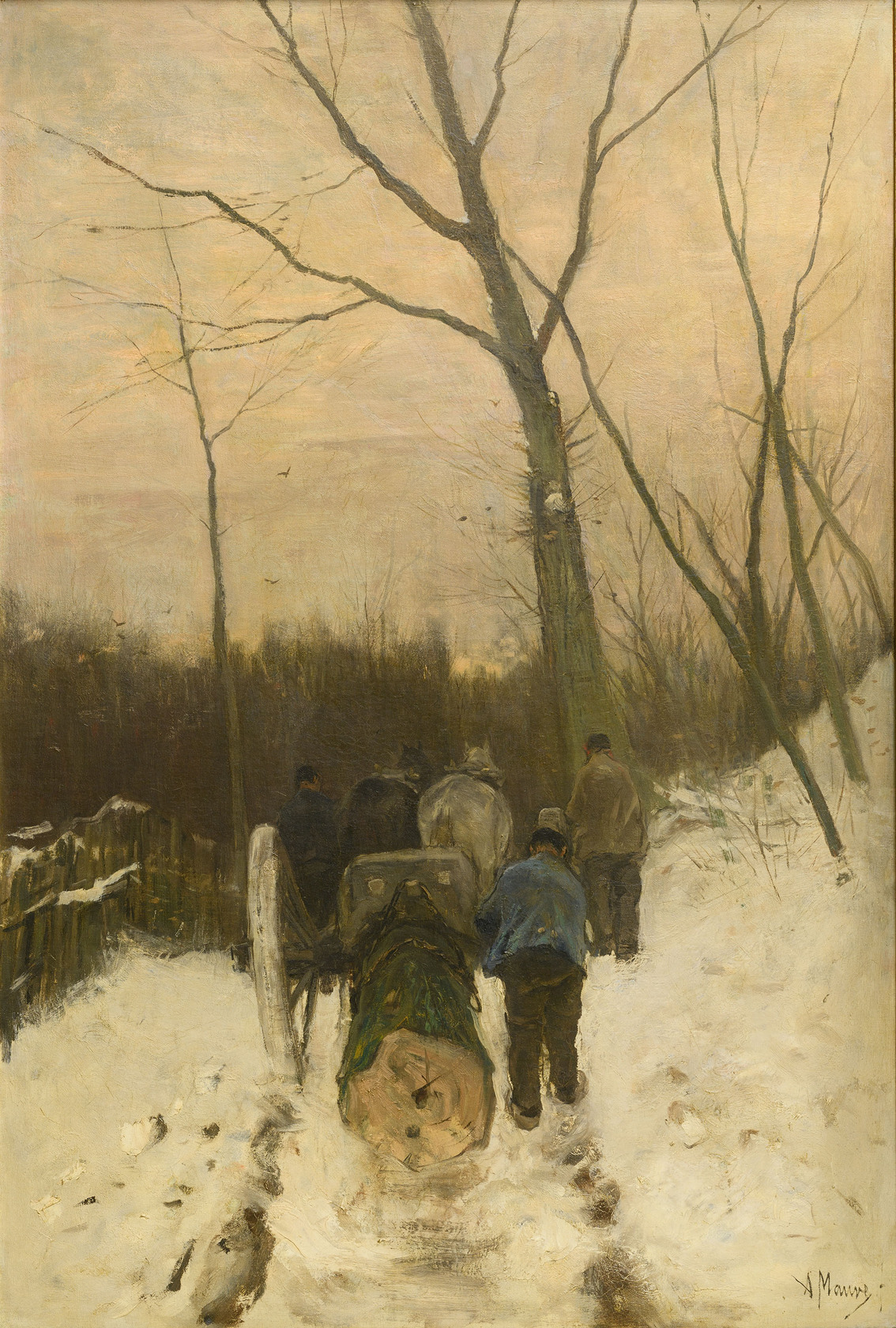
The Timber Truck (also known as The Loggers), c. 1880, oil on canvas, by Anton Mauve

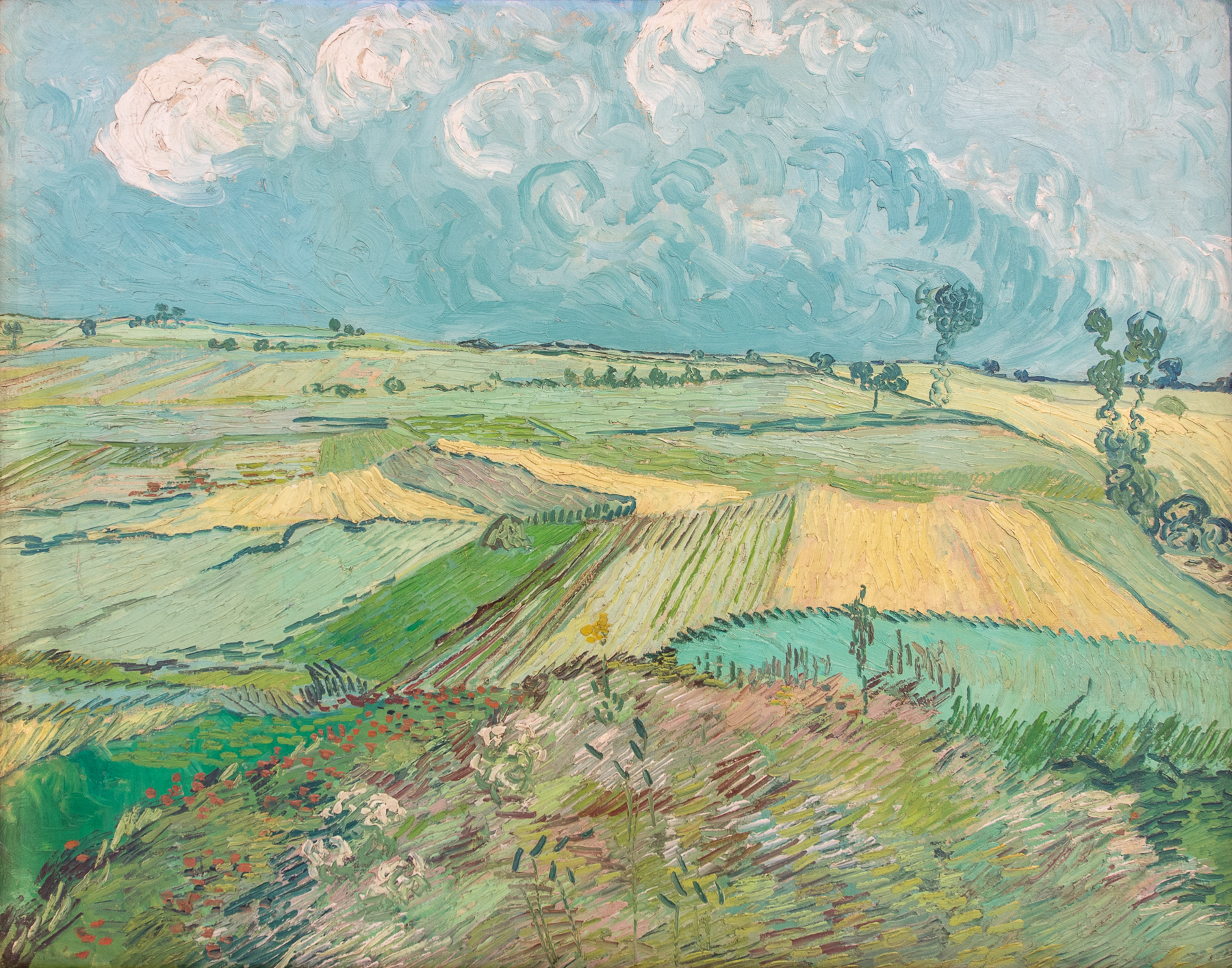
Wheat Fields After the Rain (The Plain of Auvers), 1890, oil on canvas, by Vincent van Gogh

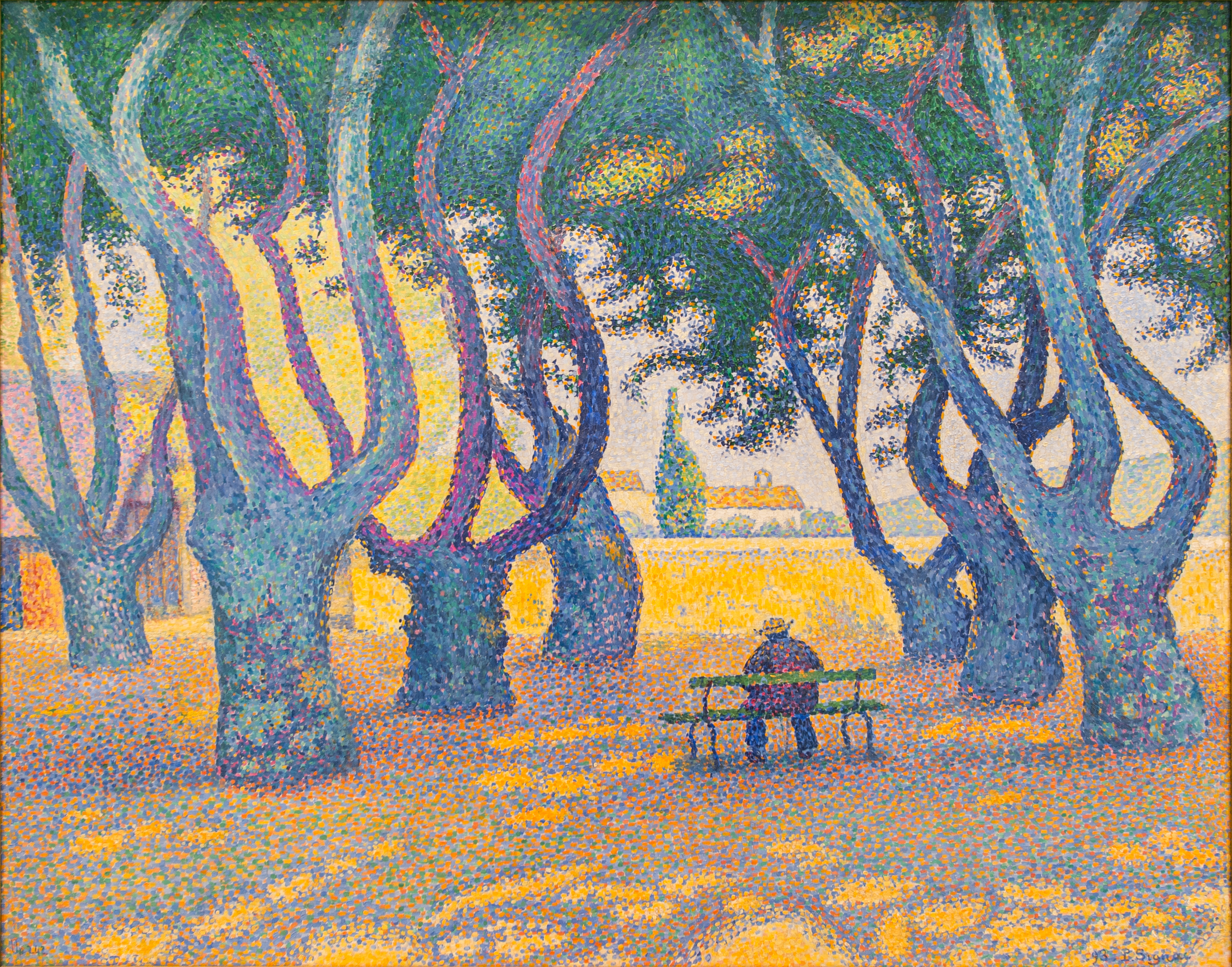
Place des Lices, 1893, oil on canvas, by Paul Signac

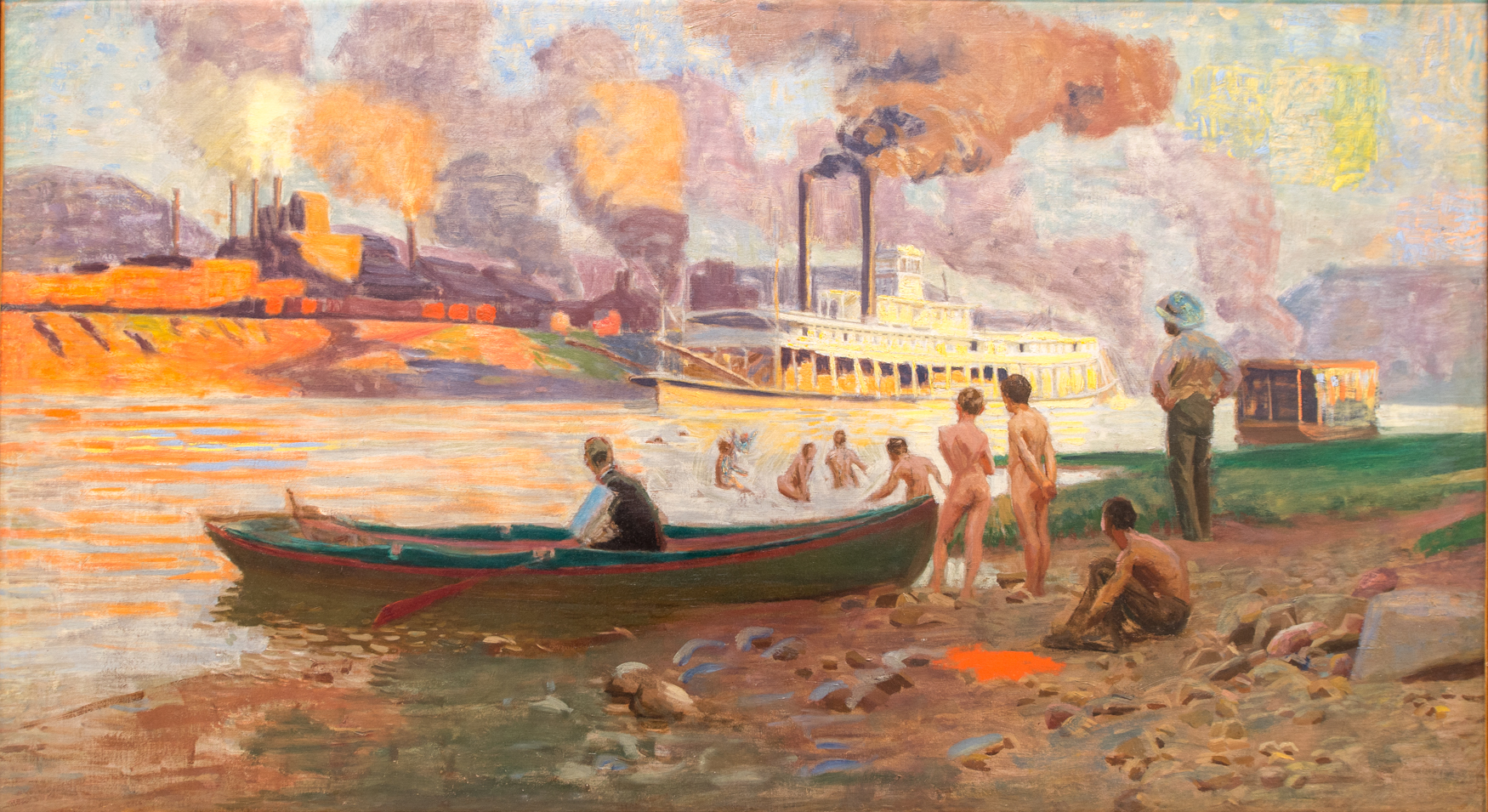
Steamboat on the Ohio, 1896, oil on canvas, by Thomas Pollock Anshutz

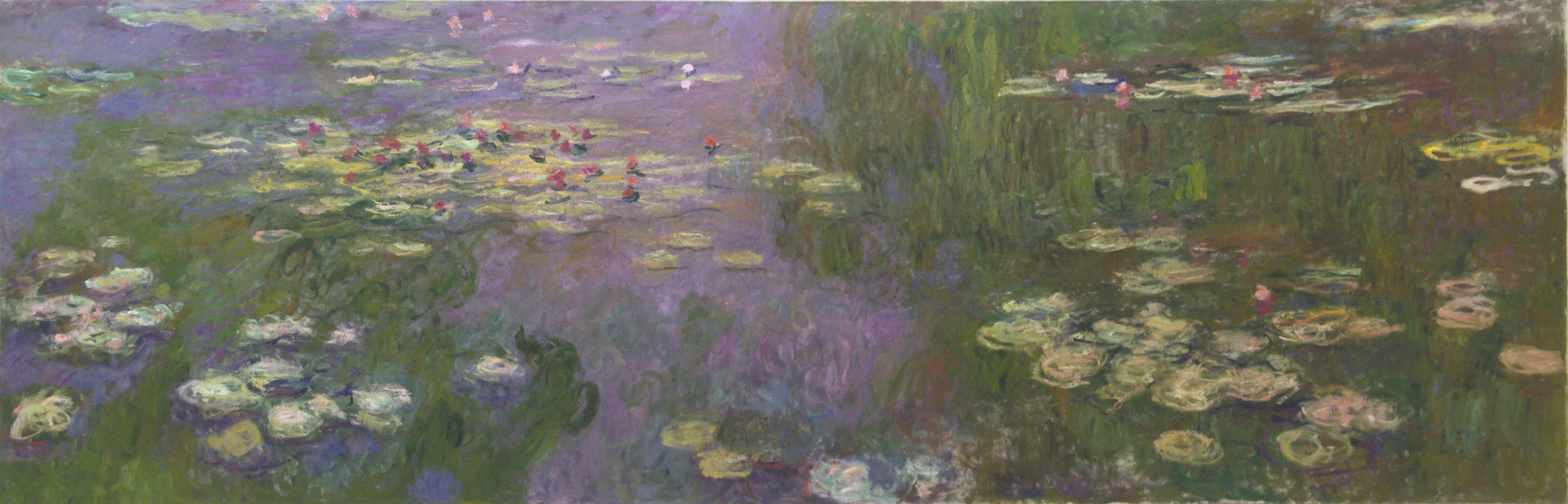
Water Lilies (Nymphéas), 1915–1926, oil on canvas, by Claude Monet

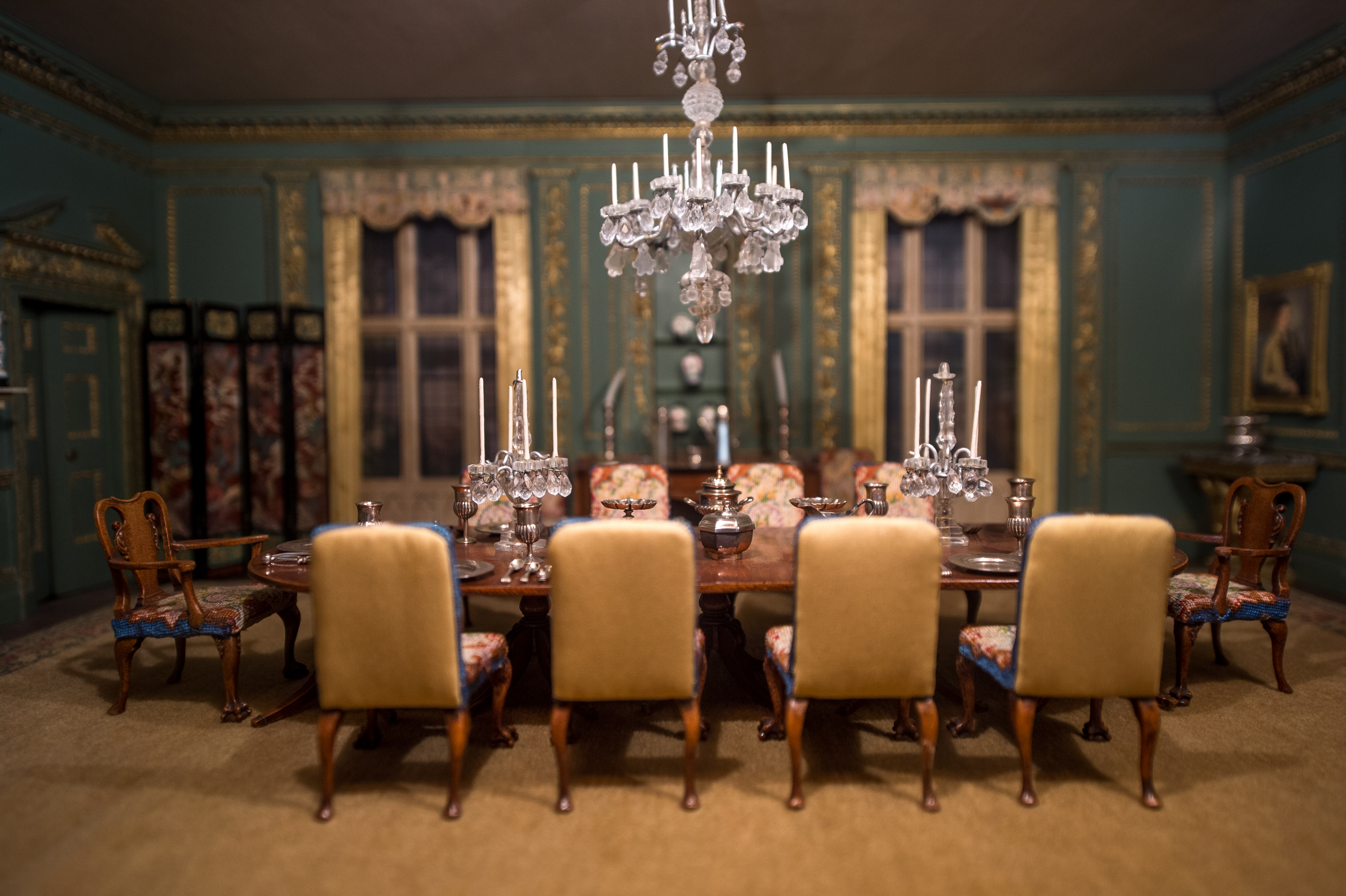
Miniature room box on display, Ruth McChesney

== Past directors ==
- John W. Beaty (1896–1921)
- Homer Saint-Gaudens (1922–1950)
- Gordon Bailey Washburn (1950–1962)
- Gustave Von Groschwitz (1963–1968)
- Leon Arkus (1968–1980)
- John R. Lane (1980–1987)
- Phillip M. Johnston (1988–1996)
- Richard Armstrong (1996–2008)
- Lynn Zelevansky (2009–2017)
- Eric Crosby (2018–present)

== See also ==
- Carnegie Museums of Pittsburgh
- Homer Saint-Gaudens
- Frick Art & Historical Center
- List of museums in Pennsylvania
- List of largest art museums
- Sally Dixon
