= Stephanie Beroes =

American filmmaker

Stephanie Beroes is a filmmaker and artist.

She was born in 1954 in Pittsburgh, Pennsylvania. She completed a Bachelor of Arts from the University of Pittsburgh in Film History. She holds a Master of Fine Arts in Filmmaking from San Francisco Art Institute.

She is regarded as an avant-garde feminist filmmaker. Her most well known work is Debt Begins at 20, a quasi-fiction documentary about the Pittsburgh punk scene.

== Films ==
- Light Sleeping (1974) sound; 4 min.
- The American Mutoscope Company (1975) sound; 14 min.
- Shadowplay (1977) sound; 6 min.
- Recital (1978) sound; 20 min.
- Valley Fever (1979) color, sound; 25 min.
- Debt Begins at 20 (1980) black-and-white, sound; 40 mins.
- Dream Screen (1986)
