= Pittsburgh Cultural Trust =

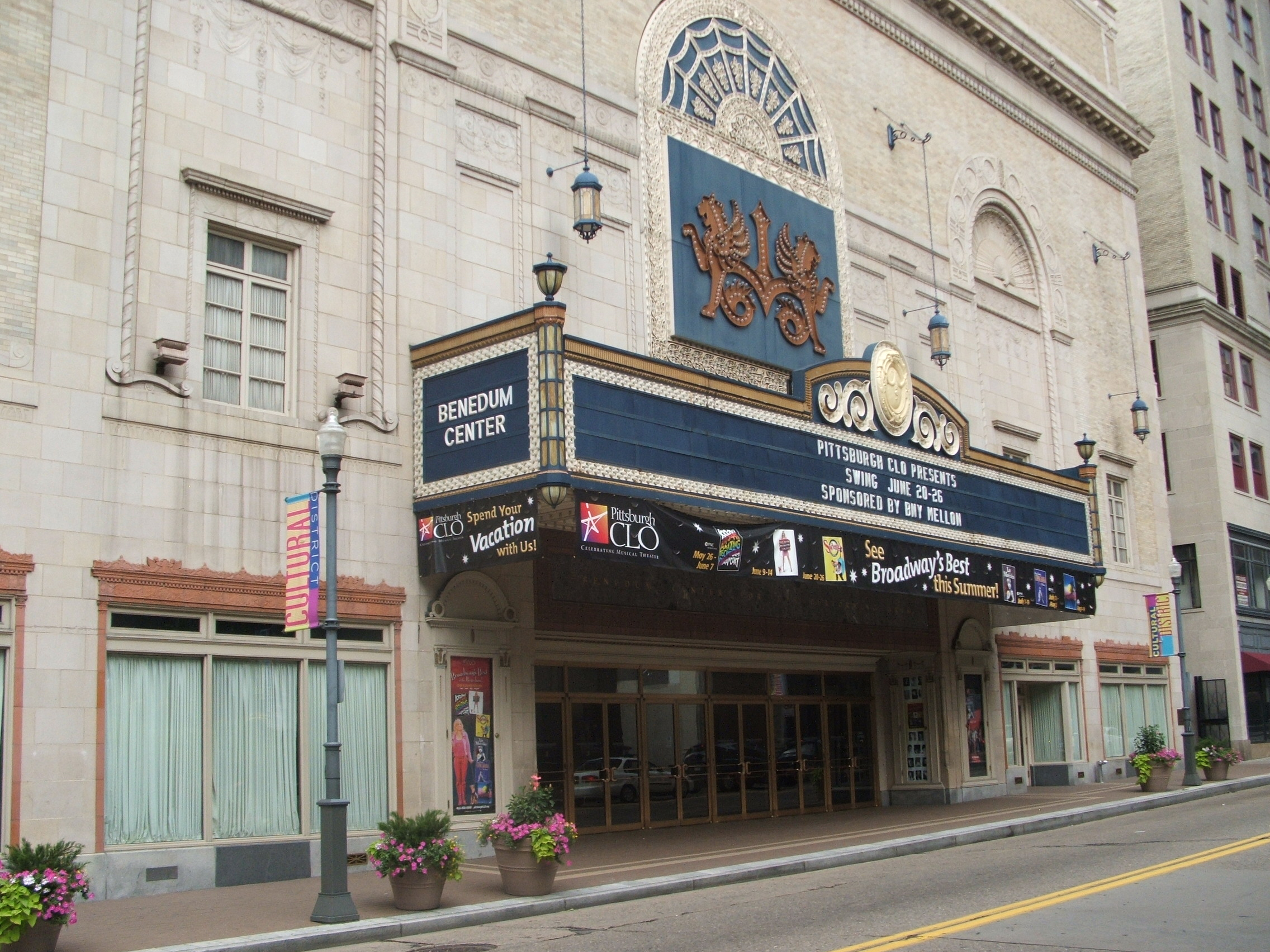
- The Pittsburgh Cultural Trust's largest theater, the Benedum Center for the Performing Arts.
- Formation: 1984
- Founder: H. J. Heinz II
- Founded at: Pittsburgh, Pennsylvania
- Type: Nonprofit
- Headquarters: Pittsburgh, Pennsylvania
- Official language: English
- President and CEO: Kendra Whitlock Ingram
- Chief Financial Officer: Linda Kosten
- Chief Development Officer: Nicholas Gigante
- Chief Programming and Engagement Officer: Brooke Horejsi
- Board of directors: David L. Holmberg, Chair; Carolyn D. Duronio, Vice Chair, Treasurer
- Revenue: $89.9 M USD (2023)
- Expenses: $71 M USD (2023)
- Website: trustarts.org

The Pittsburgh Cultural Trust is a nonprofit arts organization dedicated to the economic and cultural development of Downtown Pittsburgh. The Trust's work is concentrated on the city's Cultural District, a vibrant area that includes theaters, art galleries, public parks, restaurants, and shops. This district is notable as one of the largest urban neighborhoods in the United States managed by a single nonprofit. Incorporated in 1984 to revitalize the city during industrial collapse and economic downturn, the Trust's work in redeveloping Pittsburgh contributed to the worldwide recognition of the city's successful revitalization during the 2009 G-20 Summit.

As a major landowner and venue manager, the Trust owns and operates numerous key properties. These include major theaters like the Benedum Center for the Performing Arts, the Byham Theater, and the O'Reilly Theater, alongside various art galleries and public plazas. The organization is also a significant arts presenter, responsible for bringing a wide variety of programming to the city, such as the PNC Broadway in Pittsburgh series, contemporary dance performances, art exhibitions, music concerts, and family-focused events.

Production of major public events is another key function of the Trust, with highlights including the Dollar Bank Three Rivers Arts Festival, Highmark First Night Pittsburgh, and quarterly Gallery Crawls. Complementing its performance and event schedule, the organization provides extensive arts education and community engagement programs.

The organization is funded primarily by programming revenue and contributions. As of 2023, the Pittsburgh Cultural Trust reported $90 million in revenue and had net assets valued at $243 million.

== History ==
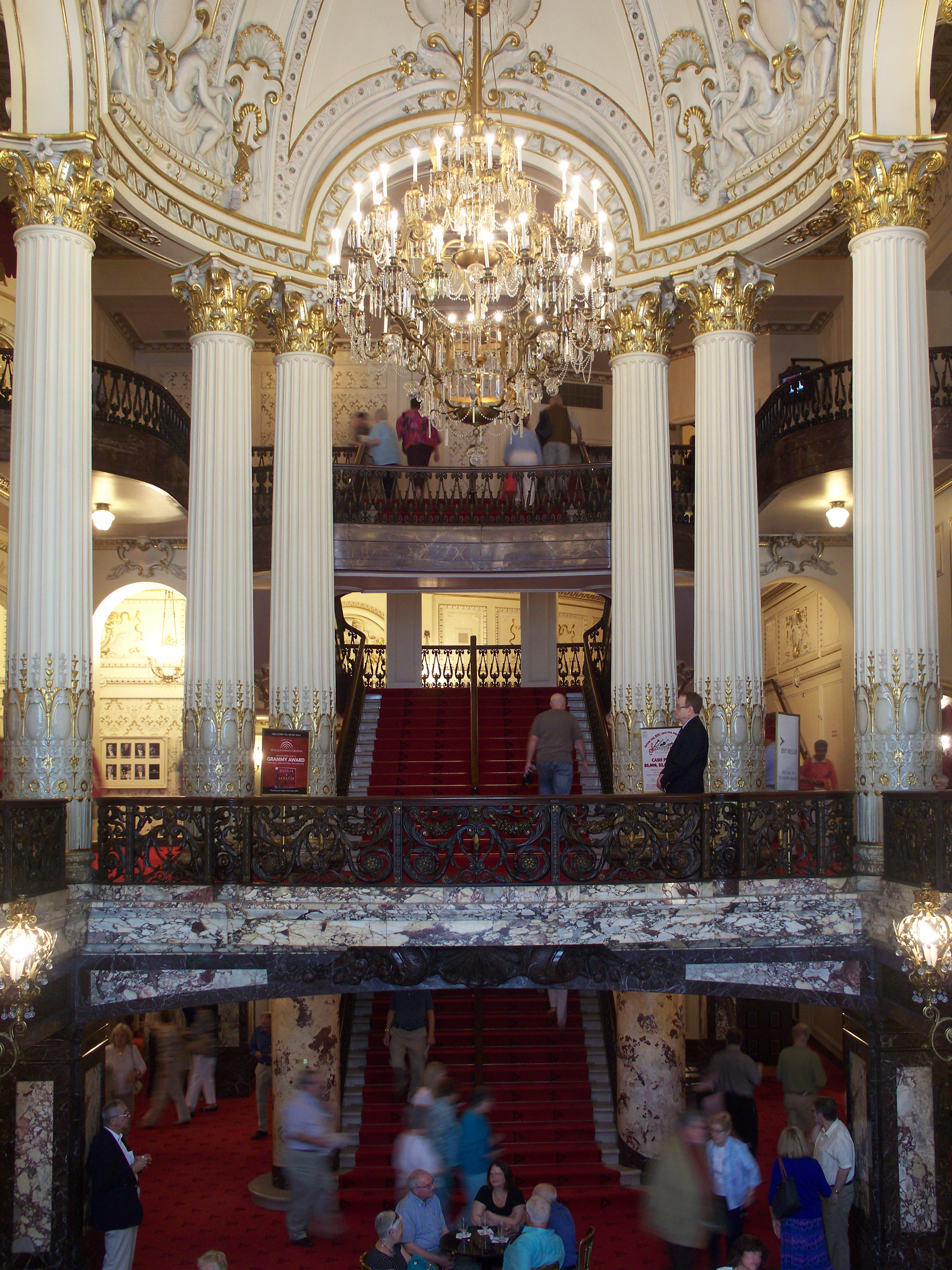
Inside the lobby of Heinz Hall, featuring its grand staircase, towering columns, and signature crystal chandelier.

Beginning in the 1960s, Pittsburgh struggled with severe economic hardship during the collapse of its steel industry. The effects of industrial decline in the city were exacerbated by a political anti-urban development sentiment, which weakened Pittsburgh's historical reliance on public-private cooperation. The combined impact led to significant urban decay and blight throughout downtown and the Golden Triangle.

Disappointed by the city's neglect of the arts, H.J. Heinz II, head of the H.J. Heinz Company and The Heinz Endowments, spearheaded a major private initiative. He led the ambitious renovation of the former Loew's Penn Theatre, a 1920s movie palace, transforming it into Heinz Hall, a now world-class concert venue for the Pittsburgh Symphony Orchestra.

The successful 1971 restoration of Heinz Hall served as a crucial demonstration of arts-led urban revitalization potential in Downtown Pittsburgh. This foundational project paved the way for Heinz to formally establish the Pittsburgh Cultural Trust in 1984. The Trust then became a primary engine for Pittsburgh's cultural and economic renewal, widely credited with transforming the downtown area and contributing significantly to the city's recovery from industrial and economic decline.

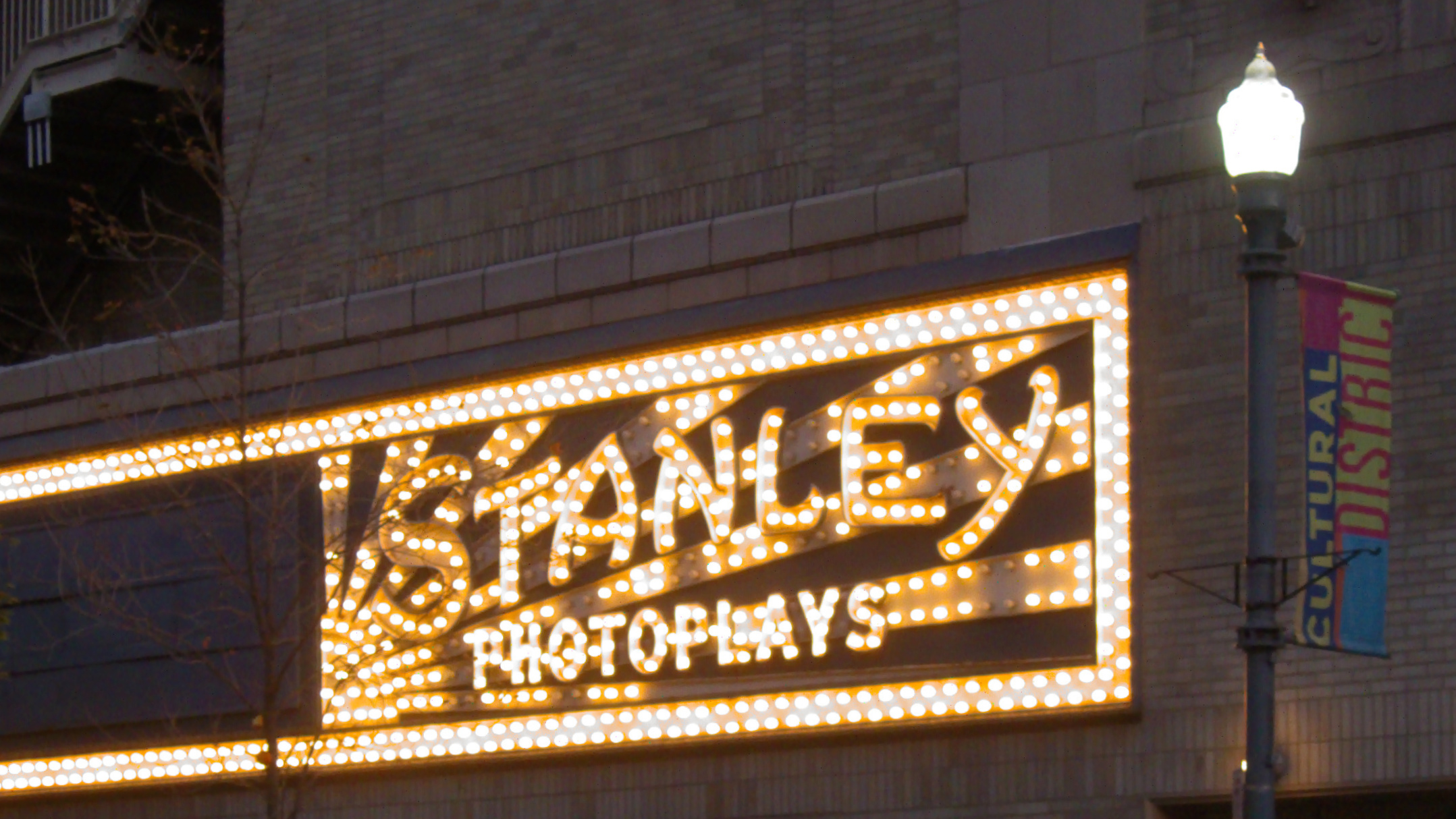
Original Stanley Theater sign on the wall of the Benedum Center for the Arts.

Following its founding in 1984, the Pittsburgh Cultural Trust immediately began its revitalization work. The Trust's first major undertaking was the renovation of the Stanley Theater. Originally opened in 1928, this movie palace underwent a $43 million restoration and reopened in 1987 as the 2,800-seat Benedum Center for the Performing Arts, a venue for touring Broadway shows, opera, ballet, and other large productions. Concurrently, the Trust also oversaw the construction of the EQT Plaza skyscraper (formerly CNG Tower), completed the same year.

The Trust continued restoring historic venues with the Byham Theater. Built in 1903 as the Gayety Theater, a prominent Vaudeville house, it later became the Fulton movie theater. Purchased and refurbished by the Trust in 1990, it received its current name after a major 1995 renovation funded by the Byham family.

Venturing further into the visual arts, the Trust opened the Wood Street Galleries in 1992. In 1995, it transformed a former adult movie theater into the Harris Theater, a 194-seat venue dedicated to independent, foreign, and classic films. Another adult bookstore was converted in 2004 into SPACE, a gallery showcasing regional artists.

New construction marked the late 1990s and early 2000s. In 1999, the 650-seat O'Reilly Theater opened as the permanent home for the Pittsburgh Public Theater. That same year saw the unveiling of the Agnes R. Katz Plaza, a significant public art space featuring a prominent Louise Bourgeois bronze fountain and work by landscape architect Dan Kiley. The Trust also commissioned other public art projects during this period. In 2003, the Theater Square complex debuted, featuring the 265-seat Cabaret at Theater Square (now Greer Cabaret Theater), a parking garage, a centralized box office, and dining options.

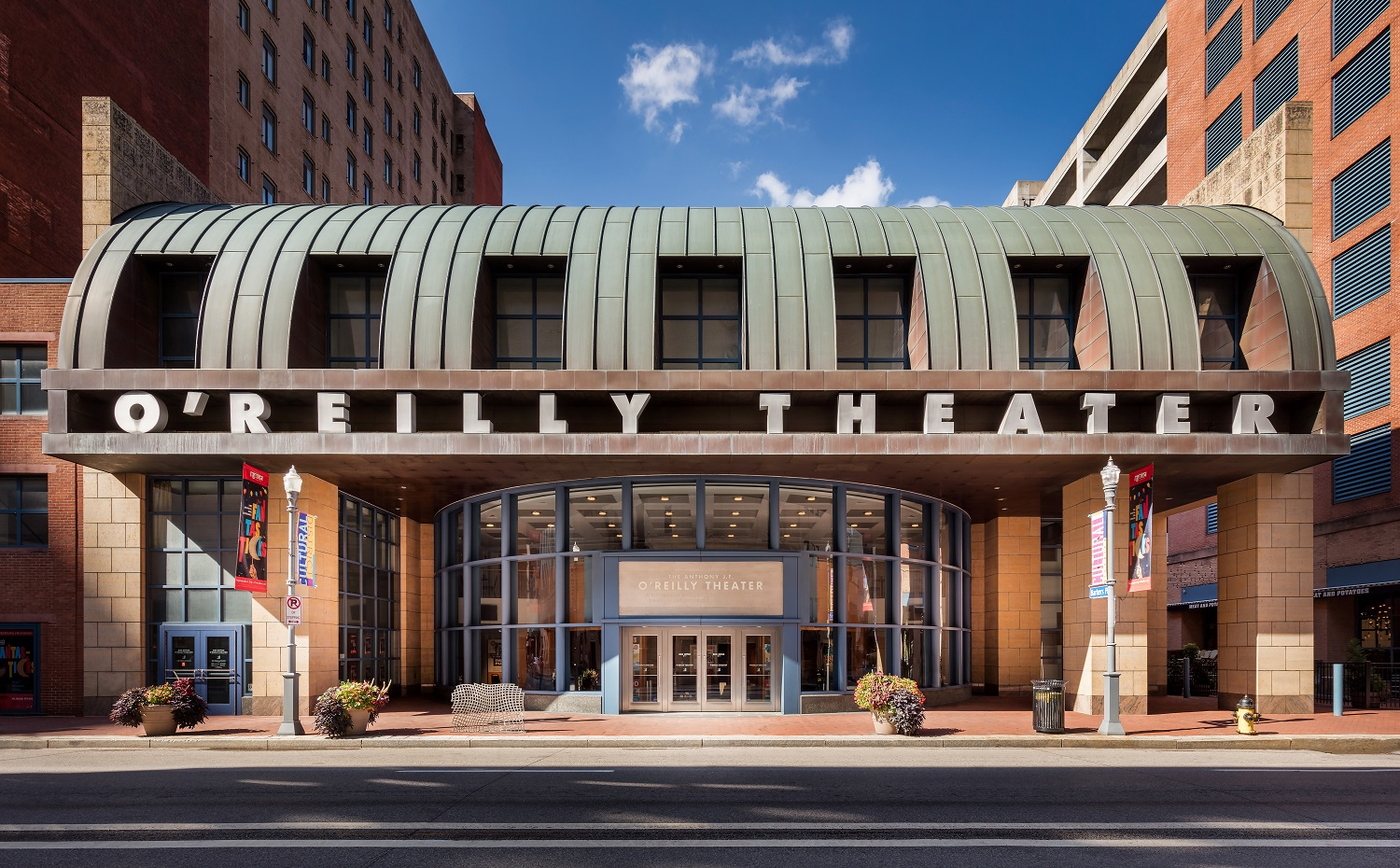
The O'Reilly Theater located on Penn Avenue is the home of Pittsburgh Public Theater.

The Trust expanded its programming significantly in the 2000s. It established Shared Services in 2000, a collaborative consortium supporting major local arts organizations including the Pittsburgh Ballet Theatre, Pittsburgh Civic Light Opera, Pittsburgh Public Theater, Pittsburgh Opera, Pittsburgh Symphony Orchestra, and August Wilson Center for African American Culture. Key festivals and events became part of the Trust's portfolio, including First Night Pittsburgh (2003), the Pittsburgh International Children's Theater and Festival (2008), and the Three Rivers Arts Festival (2009). The Trust also launched the recurring Pittsburgh International Festival of Firsts (inaugurated 2004) and the popular quarterly Gallery Crawl (2004). Dedicated spaces for education and local arts groups were acquired, including the property for the James E. Rohr Building (Trust Arts Education Center) in 2005 and 937 Liberty Avenue in 2004.

In 2013, the Trust invited Dutch artist Florentijn Hofman to bring his Rubber Duck sculpture to Pittsburgh.

The latest venues the Trust completed are Liberty Magic in 2019, and the new Greer Cabaret Theater renoveation in 2023.

In April 2025, the Trust began Arts Landing, a project for a one-acre civic space for pedestrians. The soft opening will be in April 2026 for the Pittsburgh-hosted NFL Draft, and the grand opening will be in June 2026.

== Properties ==
The Pittsburgh Cultural Trust manages a 14-block neighborhood with one million square feet of property called the Cultural District. The buildings and spaces are used for restored theaters, performance venues, public art, and recreational parks.

=== Theaters and Performance Venues ===
- Benedum Center
- Byham Theater
- O’Reilly Theater
- Harris Theater
- Greer Cabaret Theater
- Liberty Magic, a speakeasy performance space
- Heinz Hall
- August Wilson African American Cultural Center
- Arcade Comedy Theater
- Three Stories

=== Public Art Spaces ===
- Agnes R. Katz Plaza
- Allegheny Riverfront Park
- Arts Landing (2026)

=== Other Properties ===
- Wood Street Galleries
- SPACE
- 707 Gallery
- Arts Education Center
- 937 Liberty Avenue

From 2006-2011, the Trust was involved in a legal dispute over the tax-exempt status of two buildings. The City of Pittsburgh and Allegheny County appealed on the basis that holding vacant property or demolishing property with intent to sell should not be considered nonprofit use.

== Programming ==
=== Performing Arts ===
The Pittsburgh Cultural Trust includes performing arts divisions for musical theater, dance, jazz, comedy, and magic, including the following:

- PNC Broadway in Pittsburgh
- Pittsburgh Dance Council
- Dentons Cohen & Grigsby Trust Presents
- Children's Theater Series & Bridge Theater Series
- Liberty Magic
- Trust Cabaret

=== Visual and Public Arts ===
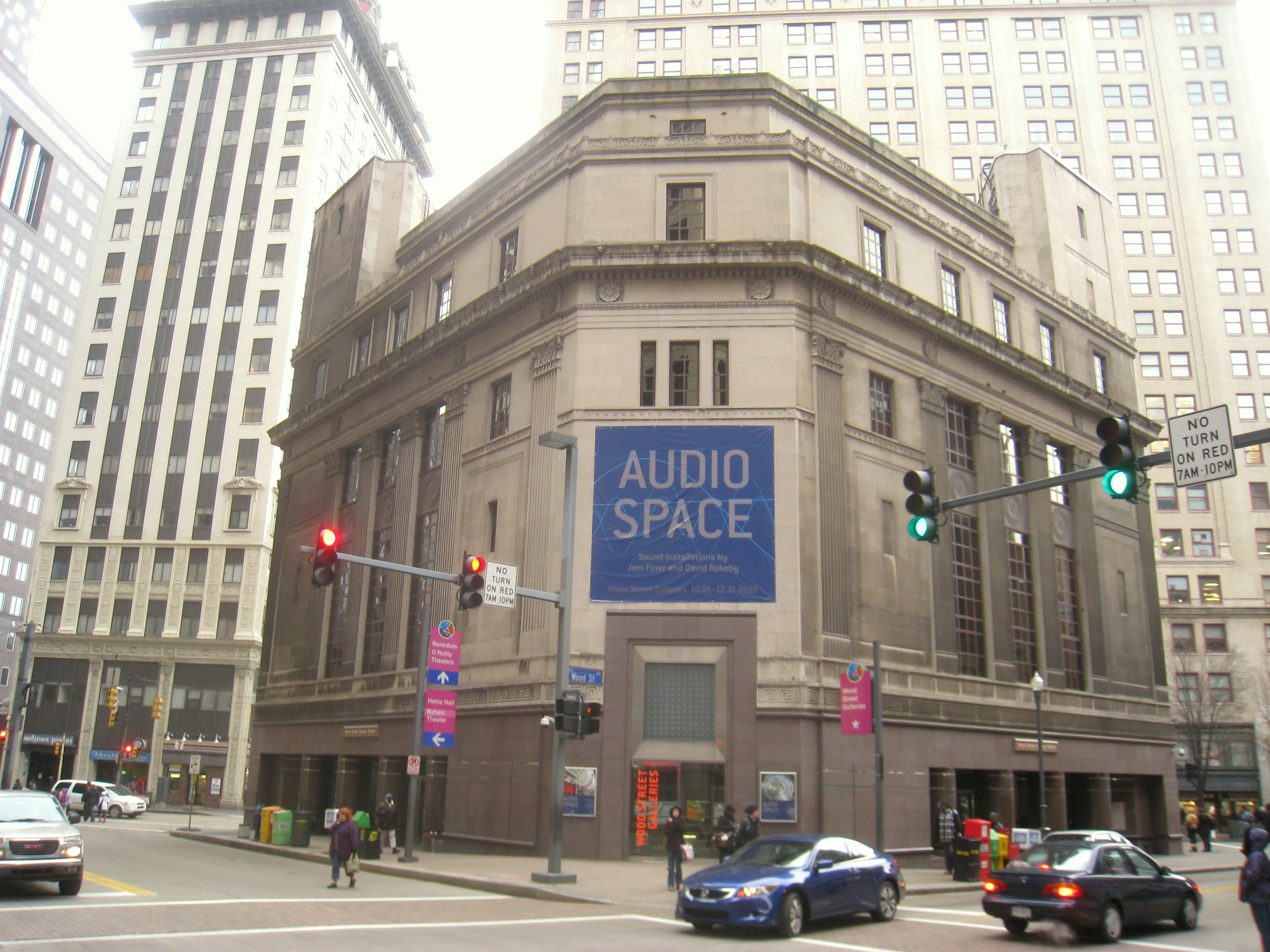
A portion of Wood Street Galleries

The Pittsburgh Cultural Trust features contemporary art exhibitions in the Wood Street Galleries, SPACE, 707 Penn, and 820 Liberty.

The Trust also has seven public art projects on display year-round in Pittsburgh's Cultural District. They include the following:

- Allegheny Riverfront Park located at the Allegheny riverfront, Rachel Carson Bridge to Fort Duquesne Bridge. The park was commissioned in the early 1990s when the PCT's District Plan included the creation of a riverfront park to border the northern boundary of the Cultural District, Pittsburgh. The PCT's then Public Arts Advisory Committee commissioned a first-time collaboration between artist Ann Hamilton and landscape architect Michael Van Valkenburgh to create the park.
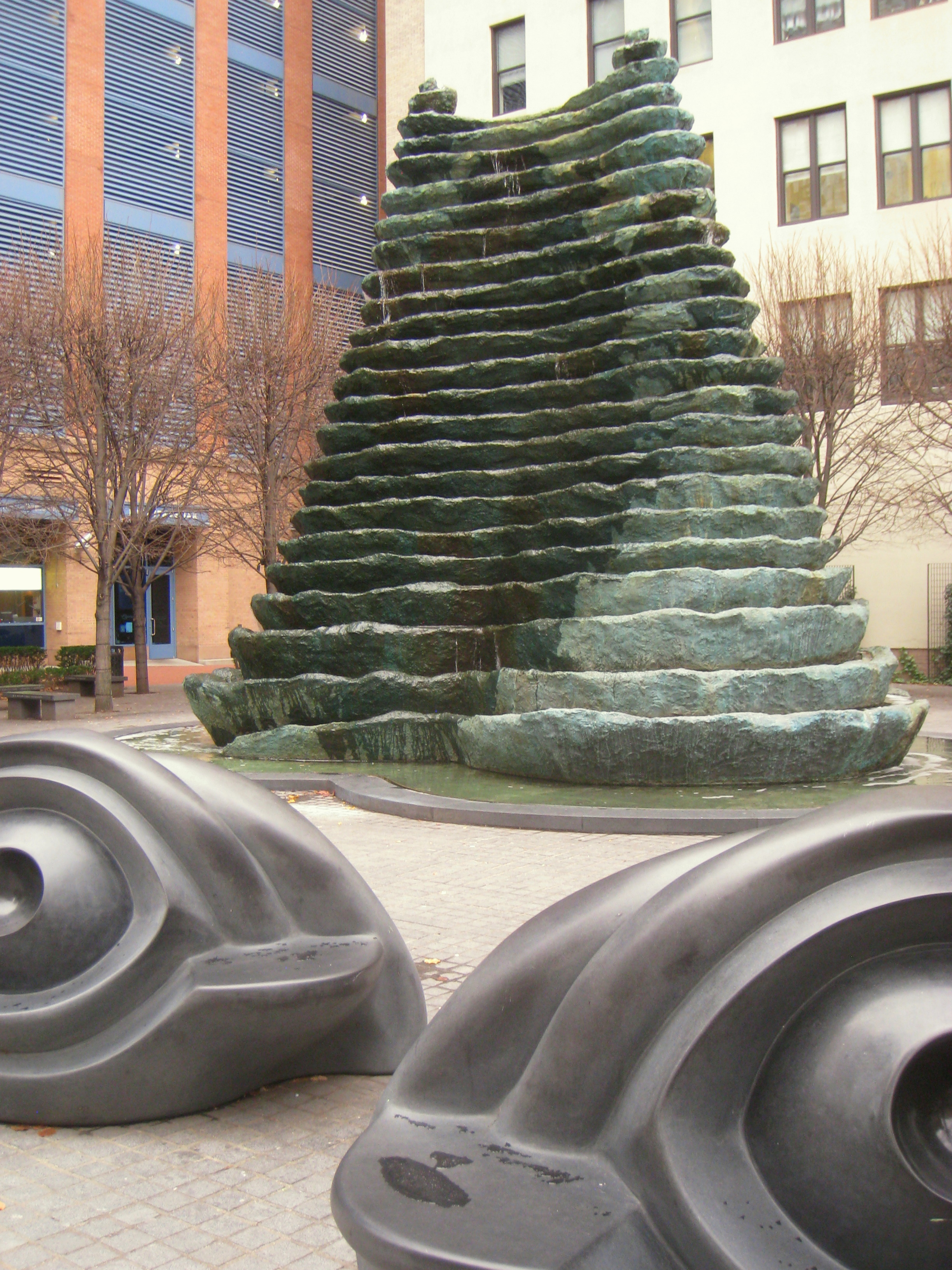
  Agnes R. Katz Plaza at 7th Avenue and Penn Avenue
- Agnes R. Katz Plaza located at 7th Avenue & Penn Avenue. Kata Plaza, commissioned in 1998, features Louise Bourgeois sculptures, including three granite benches shaped like eyeballs and the centerpiece 25-foot-tall bronze fountain. Landscape architect Dan Kiley and architect Michael Graves also worked on the project.
- Haas Mural located on the Fort Duquesne Boulevard façade of the Byham Theater, 101 6th Street. The 36-by-56-foot mural was commissioned in 1993 and painted by Richard Haas in the trompe-l'œil style.
- Magnolias for Pittsburgh located at 7th Avenue & Penn Avenue. The Public Art Network of Americans for the Arts selected Tony Tasset's "Magnolias for Pittsburgh" to be in the 2007 "Year in Review". The installation features two bronze magnolia trees, five live magnolia trees, and a landscape design.
- Momento Mori located at Tito Way & Exchange Way.
- Sign of Light located at Penn Avenue Place, Stanwix Street & Fort Duquesne Boulevard, facing the Allegheny River. This 20-by-40-foot electronic sign is composed of LEDs that project a white triangle floating on a blue-gray background. "Sign of Light" is visible from the North Side (Pittsburgh) and PNC Park.

== Notes ==
- Toker, Franklin (1994) [1986]. Pittsburgh: An Urban Portrait. Pittsburgh: University of Pittsburgh Press. ISBN 0-8229-5434-6.
