= Cultural District, Pittsburgh =

Neighborhood in Pittsburgh, Pennsylvania

Coordinates: 40.444°N 80°W

The Cultural District is a fourteen-square-block area in Downtown Pittsburgh bordered by the Allegheny River on the north, Tenth Street on the east, Stanwix Street on the west, and Liberty Avenue on the south.

The Cultural District features six theaters offering some 1,500 shows annually, as well as art galleries, restaurants, and retail shops. Its landmarks include Allegheny Riverfront Park, the Benedum Center, the Byham Theater, the Harris Theater, Heinz Hall, the O'Reilly Theater, Pittsburgh Creative and Performing Arts School, the Three Rivers Arts Festival Gallery, the Wood Street Galleries, and the August Wilson Center for African American Culture.

Major arts organizations based here include the Pittsburgh Ballet Theatre, Pittsburgh Civic Light Opera, the Pittsburgh Dance Council, Pittsburgh Opera, Pittsburgh Public Theater, the Pittsburgh Symphony Orchestra, Bricolage Production Company, and Pittsburgh Playwrights Theatre Company.

== History ==
The cultural district was the brainchild of H. J. Heinz II (1908–1987), known as Jack Heinz, and is managed by the Pittsburgh Cultural Trust. The Pittsburgh Cultural Trust was formed in 1984 to realize Jack's vision of an entire cultural district for blocks of the Penn–Liberty Avenue corridor, which then was a blighted area.

== Transforming Loew's Penn Theatre into Heinz Hall for the Performing Arts ==
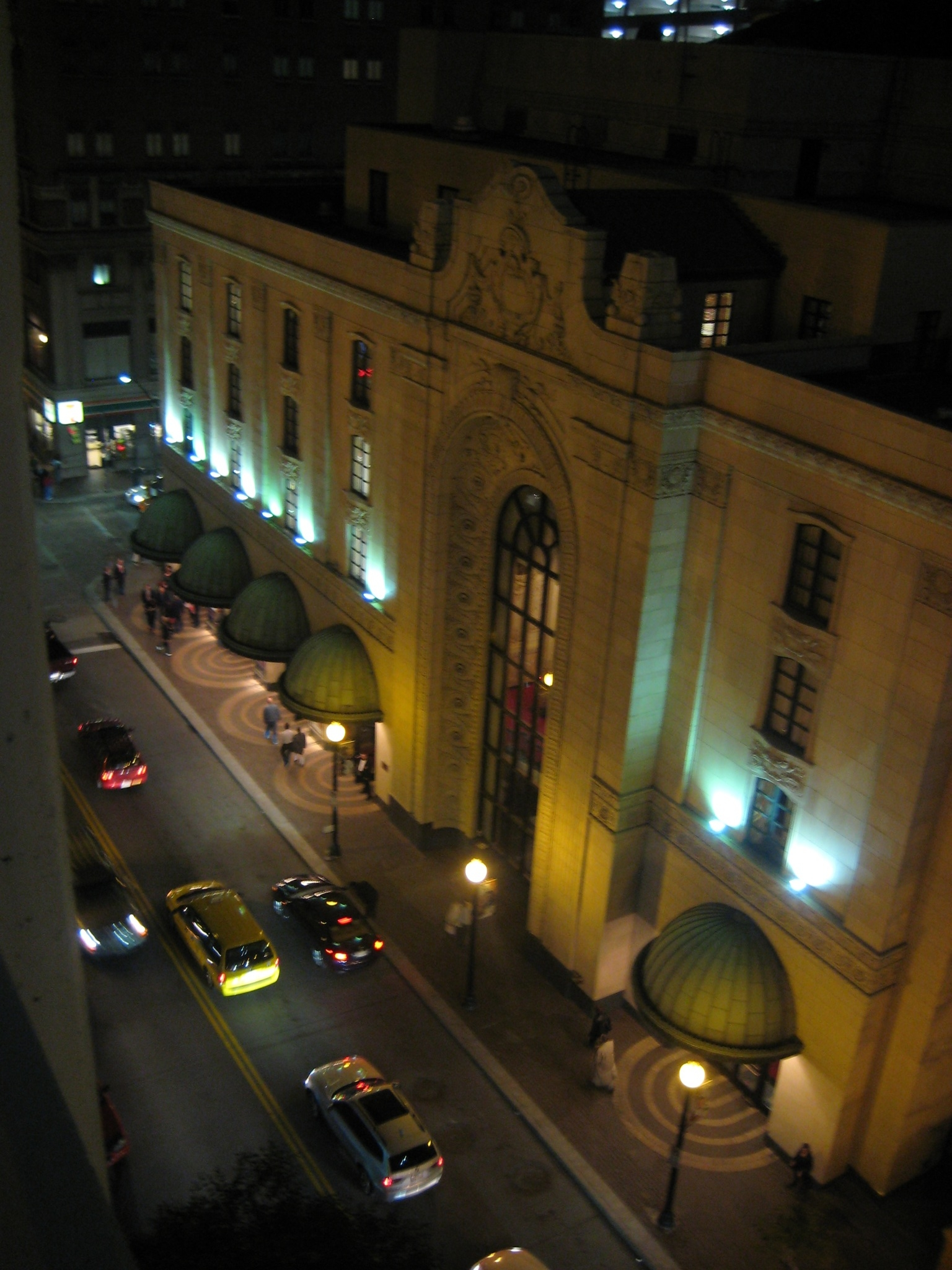
Heinz Hall (formerly Loew's Penn Theatre)

Built as the Loew's and United Artists' Penn Theatre, construction of the building was completed in 1927. Motion picture business magnate and pioneer Marcus Loew engaged the architectural firm of Rapp & Rapp to design the movie palace. The Grand Lobby was particularly impressive, with its 50-foot-high (15 m) vaulted Venetian ceiling, massive ornamental columns, marble staircase, bronze and crystal chandeliers and silk drapes.

Like many 1920s-era film palaces, Loew's Penn Theatre fell on hard times in the 1960s. Competition from television and suburban theaters along with high maintenance costs put a squeeze on profitability. The theater shut its doors in 1964 and was scheduled for demolition. Henry J. Heinz II and Charles Denby, President of the Pittsburgh Symphony Society, together with the Andrew W. Mellon Foundation, the Allegheny Conference and the Urban Redevelopment Authority of Pittsburgh, purchased the site and rescued the theater for the purpose of creating a new home for the Pittsburgh Symphony.

Jack Heinz and others, including his son, United States Senator from Pennsylvania John Heinz, and William Rea, began the changes that would follow in the district with the purchase and renovation of the former movie palace, Loew's Penn Theater, which was then transformed into the opulent and newly renamed Heinz Hall. This magnificent concert hall reopened after a complete restoration in 1971 as the new home for the Pittsburgh Symphony. The current seating configuration is 2,676. Heinz Hall is owned and operated by the Pittsburgh Symphony Society.

== The Stanley Theater becomes the Benedum Center for the Performing Arts ==
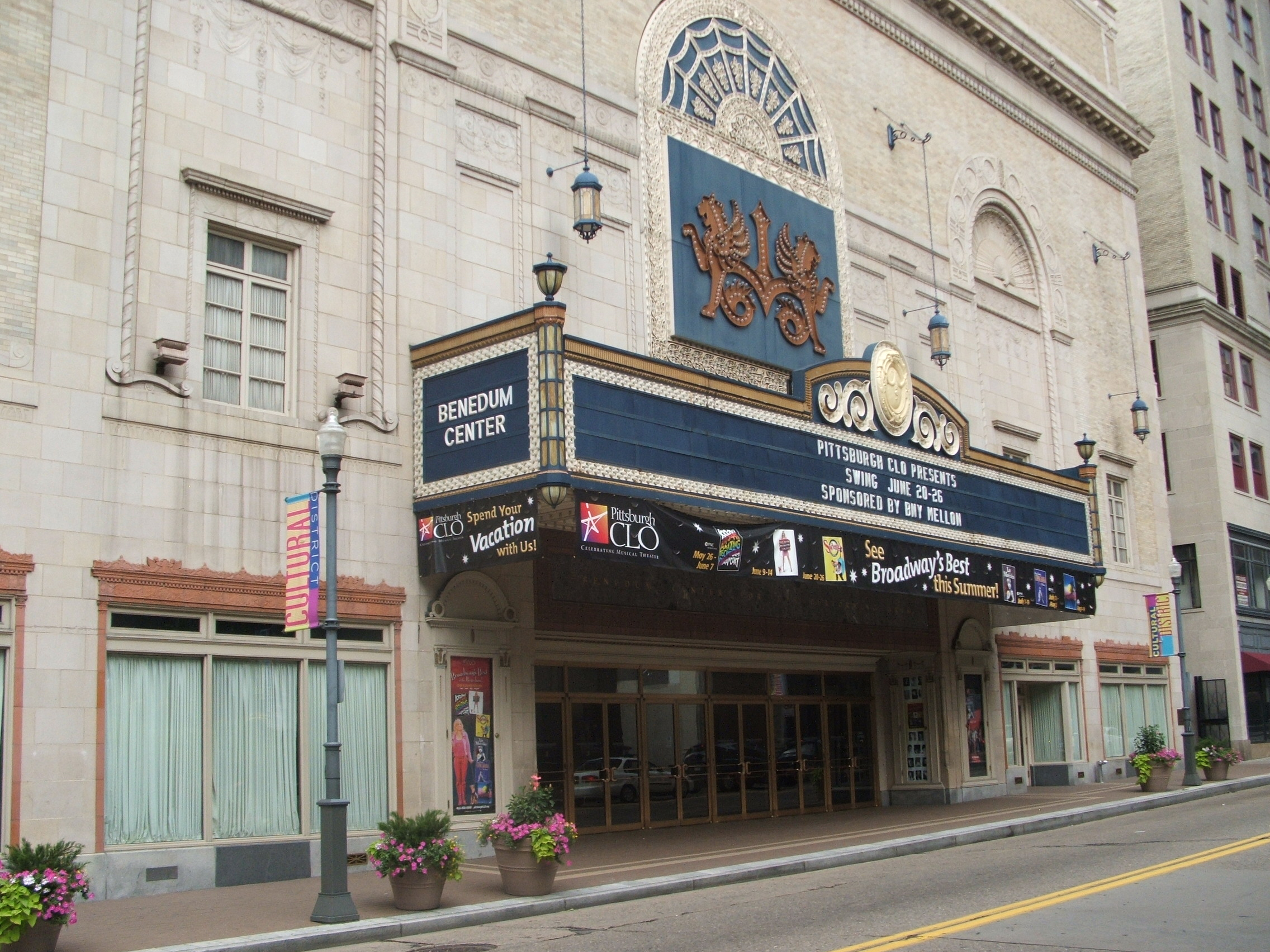
The Benedum Center (formerly The Stanley Theatre)

The Trust's first major project was the restoration of another visually stunning former movie palace, the Stanley Theater. The Stanley Theater was designed by the renowned theater architectural firm of Hoffman & Henon and opened on February 27, 1928. At the time, it had the distinction of being the largest theater in Western Pennsylvania, and was commonly known as "Pittsburgh's Palace of Amusement". After a $43 million restoration returning it to its original splendor, it reopened in 1987 as the newly renamed Benedum Center for the Performing Arts, and is currently able to host about 2,885 people. The Benedum Center is owned and operated by the Pittsburgh Cultural Trust.

== The Fulton Theater becomes the Byham Theater ==
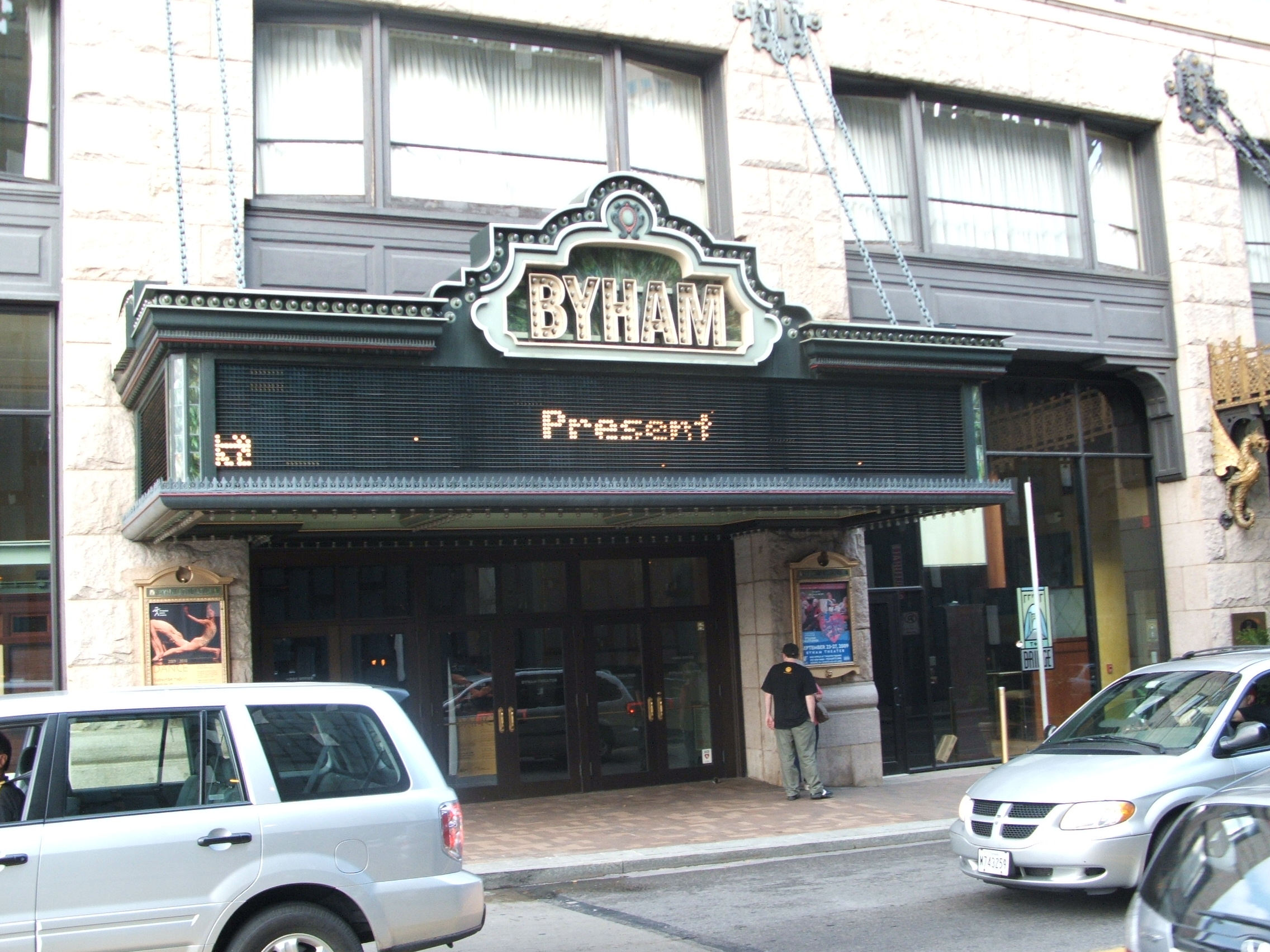
The Byham Theatre (formerly the Gayety Theatre).

The Byham Theater, a landmark building at 101 Sixth Street in Downtown Pittsburgh, was the second major theater venue restoration project of the Pittsburgh Cultural Trust. Built in 1903, the then called Gayety Theater was a stage and Vaudeville house, and it featured stars such as Ethel Barrymore, Gertrude Lawrence, and Helen Hayes. It was renamed The Fulton in the 1930s when it became a full-time movie theater. In 1990, the Pittsburgh Cultural Trust bought the theater and refurbished the Fulton as part of its plan for the Cultural District. The Byham family of Pittsburgh made a major naming gift for a 1995 renovation, and it has been the Byham Theater since. The current seating configuration is 1,300. The Byham Center is owned and operated by the Pittsburgh Cultural Trust.

== The Cultural District today ==
Today the 14-square-block area continues to transform and flourish from a red-light district with only two cultural facilities—Heinz Hall and the Convention Center—to a dynamic arts and residential neighborhood with more than fourteen arts venues, including the Pittsburgh Creative and Performing Arts School, public parks and plazas, and new commercial development. The Pittsburgh Cultural Trust applies a holistic approach and vision to urban redevelopment: streetscaping programs, facade restorations, new cultural facilities, public open spaces and art projects.

The Cultural District's transformation is widely praised and serves as a model for urban redevelopment through the arts. Brendan Lemon of The New York Times wrote, "To describe Pittsburgh's unconventional, un-Disneyfied remodeling of its Cultural District ... is to explore how theater can help transform urban identity."

The Cultural District is also home to the Pittsburgh Film Office, a non-profit organization that markets the greater southwestern Pennsylvania region as a great location for movie, television and commercial productions. Since its inception in 1990, the PFO has assisted more than 102 feature films and television productions to southwestern Pennsylvania to generate an economic impact of more than $575 million for the region.

== Listing of theaters in the Cultural District ==
- Benedum Center (formerly the Stanley Theater)
- Byham Theater (formerly the Gayety Theater, then the Fulton Theater)
- Harris Theater (formerly Art Cinema)
- Heinz Hall (formerly Loew's Penn Theater)
- O'Reilly Theater (newly built in 1999)
- The August Wilson Center for African American Culture
- The Cabaret at Theatre Square
- Bricolage Production Company
- Pittsburgh Playwrights Theatre Company

== Visual Arts in the Cultural District ==
- Wood Street Galleries
- Future Tenant
- SPACE
- 707-709 Penn Galleries
- Watercolors Gallery
- ToonSeum

== See also ==
- Theatre in Pittsburgh
