= Heinz Hall =

Performing arts center in Pittsburgh, Pennsylvania

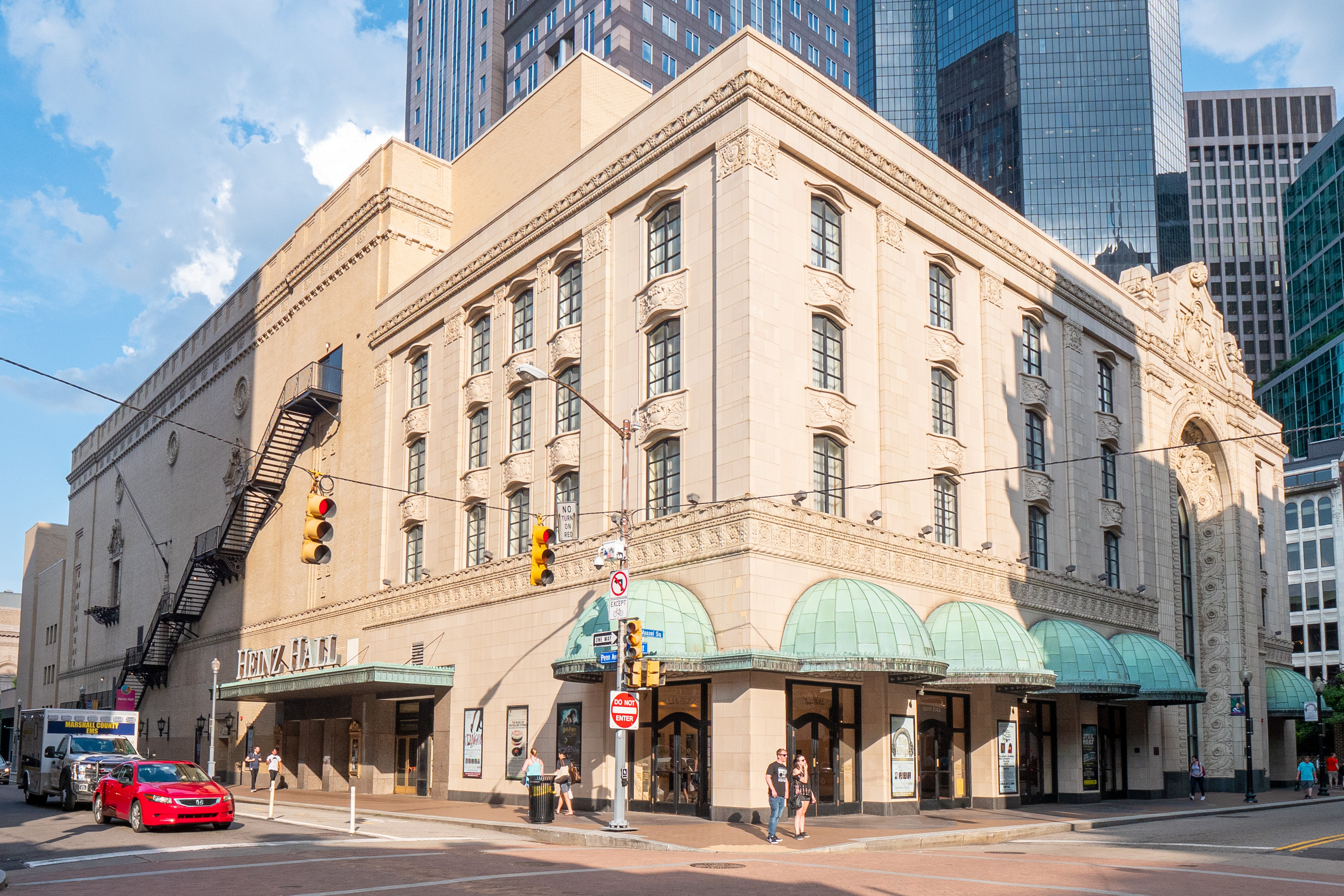
- Heinz Hall
- Interactive map of Heinz Hall
- Address: 600 Penn Avenue, Pittsburgh, Pennsylvania
- Coordinates: 40.4427°N 80.0015°W
- Owner: Pittsburgh Symphony Orchestra
- Capacity: 2,676
- Public transit: Wood Street, Gateway

Construction
- Opened: September 10, 1927
- Renovated: 1971
- Expanded: 1995
- Architect: Rapp & Rapp

Website
- pittsburghsymphony.org/pso_home/web/heinz-hall

Pittsburgh Landmark – PHLF
- Designated: 1971

Heinz Hall is a performing arts center and concert hall located at 600 Penn Avenue in the Cultural District of Pittsburgh, Pennsylvania. Home to the Pittsburgh Symphony Orchestra (PSO) and the Pittsburgh Youth Symphony Orchestra, the 2,676-seat hall presents about 200 performances each year. Originally built in 1927 as Loew's Penn Theatre, the former movie palace was renovated and reopened as Heinz Hall in 1971.

== History ==
Built as the Loew's and United Artists' Penn Theatre, construction of the building started on January 6, 1926 and was completed in 1927 on the site of the former "Hotel Anderson". Motion picture business magnate and pioneer Marcus Loew engaged the architectural firm of Rapp & Rapp to design the movie palace. The Grand Lobby was particularly impressive, with its 50-foot (15 m)-high vaulted Venetian ceiling, massive ornamental columns, marble staircase, bronze and crystal chandeliers and silk drapes.

Like many 1920s-era film palaces, Loew's Penn fell on hard times in the 1960s. Competition from television and suburban theaters along with high maintenance costs put a squeeze on profitability. The theater shut its doors in 1964 and was scheduled for demolition. Plans were made to turn it into a parking lot. Henry J. Heinz II and Charles Denby, president of the Pittsburgh Symphony Society, together with the Andrew W. Mellon Foundation, the Allegheny Conference and the Urban Redevelopment Authority of Pittsburgh, purchased the site and rescued the theater for the purpose of creating a new home for the Pittsburgh Symphony.

From 1967 to 1971, the building was extensively renovated. While the basic architecture of the building remained unchanged, the entrance was moved outwards and faced with a 40-foot (12 m)-high arched window. The one-ton chandeliers were rebuilt and their crystals replaced. The original polychrome decor was replaced by a brilliant white and gold design. Ornamental elements in the auditorium were replaced by acoustical baffles to convert the former movie theater into a lively sounding concert hall. The back of the building was extended, adding almost 30 feet (9.1 m) to the stage, and making space for dressing rooms, a music library, and rehearsal rooms.

The Grand Opening of Heinz Hall was on September 10, 1971.

In 1982, the Heinz Foundation sponsored the creation of Heinz Hall Plaza and a four-story addition to the hall.

In 1995, Heinz Hall underwent a further four-month, $6.5-million renovation, including a new orchestra shell, acoustical risers, new butterfly sound reflector, heating and air conditioning improvements, fresh paint, wallpaper and gold leaf and auditorium seats refurbishment.

== Background ==
Heinz Hall almost never existed because plans were being made for an entire $40 million cultural complex in the Upper Hill District, above the Civic Arena. This plan fell through when a new stadium for the Pittsburgh Steelers and Pirates took top priority. The Howard Heinz Endowment paid $850,000 for the closed and vacant movie house known as Pittsburgh's "Temple of the Cinema" in 1967. The Heinz family would also fund the multimillion-dollar renovation for the performing arts center that would house all local production companies.

Henry John Heinz was an active contributor and a major force in the development of downtown Pittsburgh, particularly the Cultural District. Called a "generic philanthropist" by a friend, H. J. Heinz donated to the arts, healthcare, education, historic preservation, and was an active contributor all over the city. Carol Brown, president of the Cultural Trust said (about H. J. Heinz), "He was a man of great taste. He expected the best, and he expected his standards to be met." Heinz was an especially strong force in the arts, all while running the well-known company his grandfather founded.

== Renovation ==
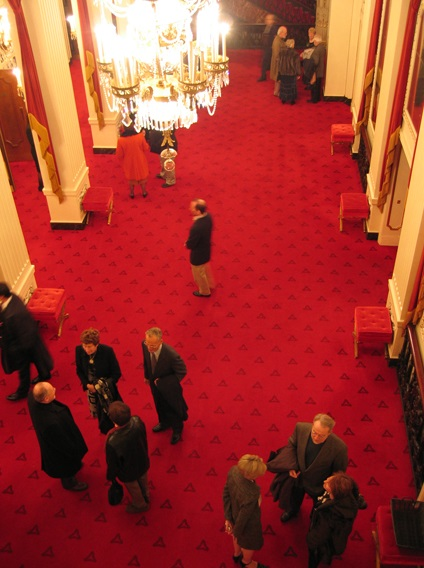
Grand Lobby of Heinz Hall

Refurbishing an old movie palace was a more practical plan compared to the enormous cost of building a new performing arts complex. Although much of the grandeur of the Loew's Penn still remains, the decor of the remodeled Heinz Hall is comparatively simple while retaining the elegant lines of the original theater. It took three years for the $10 million renovation to be completed, most of the work being done by local craftsmen and artisans. The 24-karat gold leafing alone took 18 months for two local craftsmen from the A. J. Vater Company to complete. The theater's original chandeliers were rebuilt and redesigned with new crystals. Once a year, all of the chandeliers are lowered to be cleaned and re-lamped. The orchestra pit is powered by a hydraulic lift and is able to hold 80-85 musicians. A new five story wing was also added in the back of the building. It added 25 feet (7.6 m) to the stage and has a lot more dressing rooms and soundproof rehearsal rooms. The main rehearsal room has the same dimensions as the stage, allowing the orchestra to maintain its concert seating arrangement in rehearsals. The original theater's acoustics, designed for films and vaudeville, were made more lively by the removal of heavy drapes and upholstery and the addition of acoustical baffles throughout the auditorium. The fan reflector proscenium helps project sound further, making Heinz Hall a "good throw."

The acoustics are generally excellent throughout the renovated hall with the most expensive seats in the dress circle of the balcony having the best sound. However, the premiere boxes of the Grand Tier (the deluxe mezzanine "loge" seating of the Loew's Penn) are acoustically poor for concert performances due to their position deep underneath the overhang of the balcony. Heinz Hall was a great improvement for the Pittsburgh Symphony over its previous home, the Syria Mosque, which was visually and acoustically drab. Another design feature of Loew's movie house features that makes Heinz Hall a great venue for concerts or shows is its excellent sight lines with not a bad seat in the house. In 1995 Heinz Hall underwent a further $6.5 million renovation in which new additions were made to make a visit to the theater more enjoyable.

== Grand opening ==
William Steinberg conducted the Pittsburgh Symphony at the hall's inaugural concert on September 10, 1971. Local press coverage of the opening was limited because the Pittsburgh Press was on strike at the time, but it was reported in the New York Times. The performance began with Beethoven's overture The Consecration of the House, followed by Fadograph of a Yestern Scene, Op. 44 which was commissioned from Samuel Barber for the event. The concert concluded with Mahler's Symphony No. 2 featuring soloists Benita Valente (soprano) and Joanna Simon (mezzo-soprano) along with chorists from Penn State. Among the celebrities in attendance for the grand opening were Samuel Barber, Charlton Heston, James Earl Jones, Agnes de Mille, and Gregory Peck. The dedication speech was given by H. J. Heinz II.

Two days later Pittsburgh Civic Light Opera (CLO) had its opening night in its fourth home.

== Additions ==
In February 1978, plans were announced for the construction of a garden beside Heinz Hall, and the building housing Woolworth's was soon demolished. The Garden Plaza opened May 7, 1982. During spring, summer, and early fall the Garden Café is open for lunch on weekdays. Also, during intermission guests can go out to the plaza to see the waterfall and water sculpture, Quartet by Angela Conner. Another place to have a special event is the elegant Mozart Room. A reservation is needed, but it is open for pre-show dining or a private function. The Mozart Room and the Garden Café are catered by Common Plea Catering . In 2010 sidewalk and entrance ways were improved and in the summer of 2011 the roof and moorings will be refurbished as part of an ongoing $20 million effort to renovate Heinz Hall.

== Notable events ==
On April 24, 1979, the hall hosted Gulf Oil Corporation's annual stockholders meeting, which was at the time the city's largest corporation.

The 1987–88 season was the beginning for the second performing arts center to open downtown. The Benedum Center (formerly the Stanley Theater, another once opulent old movie palace) became the new home of the Pittsburgh Opera, Pittsburgh Ballet Theater, Civic Light Opera and Pittsburgh Dance Council.

A memorial service for Pittsburgh native, Fred Rogers was held three months after his death in 2003. In 2004, local musicians came together with special guest, Bruce Springsteen, for the Flood Aid concert to help local residents after many neighborhoods were flooded from Hurricane Ivan. The December 2nd concert was sold out. The hall played host to the politically motivated Vote for Change Tour on October 1, 2004, featuring performances by James Taylor and The Dixie Chicks. Marvin Hamlisch conducted a four-part pops concert in 1995 that aired on PBS. A segment of the Doo-Wop series has also been taped on the stage. Heinz Hall was briefly seen in the 1991 movie Bob Roberts, directed by Tim Robbins. It really made its movie debut in the 1998 TV movie The Temptations. Most recently, Mayor Luke Ravenstahl and the Steelers’ Max Starks "competed" in the Broadway musical, The 25th Annual Putnam County Spelling Bee. Taped on the stage of Heinz Hall, composer and songwriter Burt Bacharach was on NBC's Today show December 5, 2006. Heinz Hall is an important part of the arts in Pittsburgh and continues to make history. In 2012, Phish guitarist, Trey Anastasio, performed his compositions with the Pittsburgh Symphony Orchestra. Songs selected were from the Phish catalog as well as Trey's own orchestral written pieces "Guyute (orchestral)" and "Time Turns Elastic". They finished the evening with a take on The Beatles' Abbey Road finale.

On September 25, 2021, Heinz Hall reopened for the first time after the COVID-19 pandemic, celebrating its 50th anniversary with performance by the Pittsburgh Symphony Orchestra.

== Exchange Hotel ==
Prior to construction of Loew's Penn Theatre, a hotel occupied its site. The Exchange Hotel was located there in the 1840s. Charles Dickens and his wife are documented to have stayed at the Exchange for 3 days in March, 1842. Circa 1872 the hotel renamed itself the St. Clair Hotel and expanding down Penn Avenue before 1882, circa 1890 until the 1920s the hotel renamed itself once again to the Anderson Hotel.

== See also ==
- Theatre in Pittsburgh

== Bibliography ==
- "Heinz Hall for the Performing Arts." Cinema Treasures. 2005. Cinema Treasures. Heinz Hall for the Performing Arts in Pittsburgh, PA - Cinema Treasures.
- "Loew's Penn Theater." Historic Pittsburgh Image Collections. 2 Nov. 2006. Request Rejected.
- Naylor, David. Great American Movie Theaters. Baltimore: The Preservation Press, 1987.
- American Picture Palaces: The Architecture of Fantasy. New York: Van Nostrand Reinhold Company, 1981.
- "Who's Who: An Explanation of Some Historic Names Visitors Will Hear Again and Again in Pittsburgh." Visit Pittsburgh.com. Archived 2006-10-16 at the Wayback Machine].
