= Harris Theater =

Harris Theater may refer to:

- Harris Theater (Chicago), a 2003-built mostly underground 1525-seat performing arts space in Millennium Park in downtown Chicago.
- One of the twin Harris and Selwyn Theaters, a 1922 900-seat Chicago theater located at Dearborn and Lake Street.
- Harris Theater (Pittsburgh), a 200-seat cinema and a 1900s landmark building in Pittsburgh.
- One of two demolished theaters on 42nd Street in Manhattan:
  - Anco Cinema, at 254 West 42nd Street, known as the Harris Theatre from 1911 to 1920, demolished 1997;
  - The Sam H. Harris Theatre at 226 West 42nd Street, demolished 1996.
- Joan and Irving Harris Concert Hall, a 500-seat venue in Aspen, Colorado.
