= William Rea =

William Rea may refer to:

- William Rea (ironmaster) who lived in Monmouth (now in Wales) in the early 18th century
- William Rea (politician), Member of the Queensland Legislative Assembly, Australia
- William Rea (real estate magnate) (1912–2006) of Pittsburgh, Pennsylvania
- William Rea (long jumper) (born 1952), Austrian-American long jumper
- William J. Rea (1920-2005), U.S. federal judge
