= The Chief (play) =

Play

- Original language: English
- Written by: Rob Zellers and Gene Collier
- Characters: Art Rooney
- Subject: Art Rooney reminiscing about his early life and how he founded the Steeler franchise
- Genre: Drama
- Setting: Pittsburgh, Pennsylvania

Premiere
- Date: 2003; October 14, 2010 (film)
- Place: O'Reilly Theater, Pittsburgh; Byham Theater, Pittsburgh (film)
- Official website

The Chief is a 2003 biographical one-man play about the Pittsburgh Steelers' founder and owner Art Rooney (1901–1988). The Pittsburgh Public Theater show has had several revivals since its inauguration, with shows often performed by Pittsburgh native Tom Atkins. More recently, Pittsburgh-based actor and Point Park University Phil Winters has taken on the role, performing at the Pittsburgh Public Theater in 2021 and at St. Vincent College in 2015.

== Overview ==
The story takes place in 1976 in Pittsburgh, Pennsylvania, two months after the Steelers won their second Super Bowl in Super Bowl X. The story begins in Art Rooney's office at Three Rivers Stadium where he is preparing for a dinner at the local Knights of Columbus hall. He then begins to converse with the audience, where he reminisces about his youth, and how he formed the Steeler franchise. The play concludes with Rooney showing footage of the Immaculate Reception.

== 2010 film adaptation ==
In 2010, a film version of the play was produced, with Atkins reprising his role as "The Chief".
