= Benedum Center =

Theater and concert hall in Pittsburgh, Pennsylvania

Benedum Center for the Performing Arts
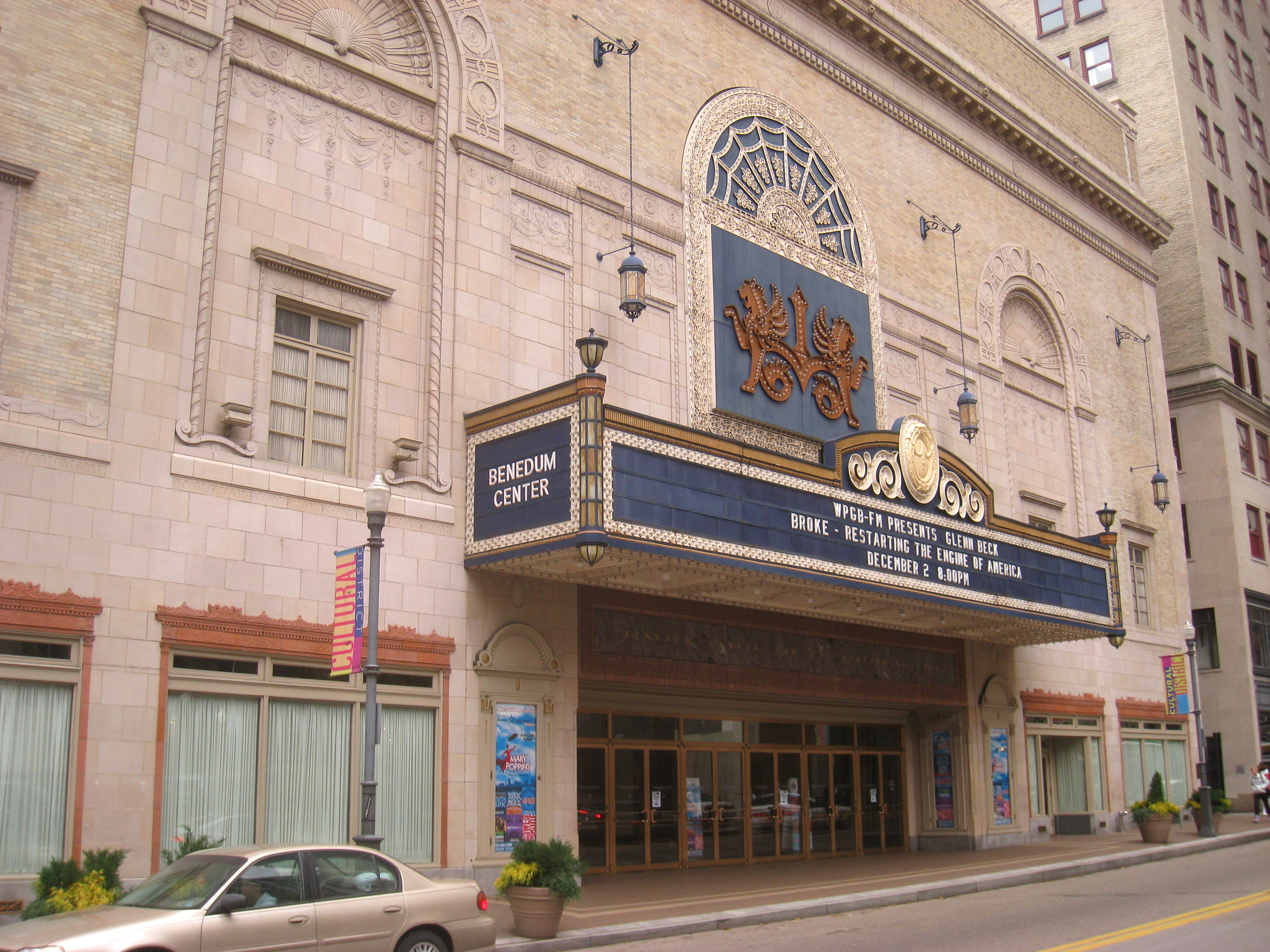
- Interactive map of Benedum Center for the Performing Arts
- Former names: Stanley Theatre (1928−1987)
- Address: 237 7th Street; Pittsburgh, Pennsylvania, U.S.
- Owner: Pittsburgh Cultural Trust
- Capacity: 2,800
- Type: Movie palace
- Screen: 1
- Current use: Performing arts center

Construction
- Opened: February 27, 1927
- Reopened: September 25, 1987
- Architect: Hoffman−Henon

Tenants
- Pittsburgh Opera, Pittsburgh Ballet Theatre, Pittsburgh Civic Light Opera

Website
- culturaldistrict.org
- Stanley Theater and Clark Building
- U.S. National Register of Historic Places
- City of Pittsburgh Historic Structure
- Pittsburgh Landmark – PHLF
- Location within Pittsburgh Location within Pennsylvania Location within the United States
- Coordinates: 40°26′34″N 79°59′59″W
- Area: Pittsburgh Cultural District
- Built: 1927
- Architect: Hoffman and Henon
- Architectural style: Late 19th and 20th Century Revivals
- NRHP reference No.: 86000303

Significant dates
- Added to NRHP: February 27, 1986
- Designated CPHS: November 20, 1984
- Designated PHLF: 1976

The Benedum Center for the Performing Arts (formerly the Stanley Theatre) is a theater and concert hall located at 237 7th Street in the Cultural District of Pittsburgh, Pennsylvania. Designed by the Philadelphia architectural firm Hoffman-Henon, it was opened in 1927 as the Stanley Theatre. The former movie palace was renovated and reopened as the Benedum Center for the Performing Arts in 1987.

The 2,800-seat venue is the home of the Pittsburgh Opera, Pittsburgh Ballet Theatre, and Pittsburgh Civic Light Opera, all of which were previously based at Heinz Hall. It is a centerpiece of the Pittsburgh Cultural District and is one of the most utilized theaters in the nation today.

== History ==
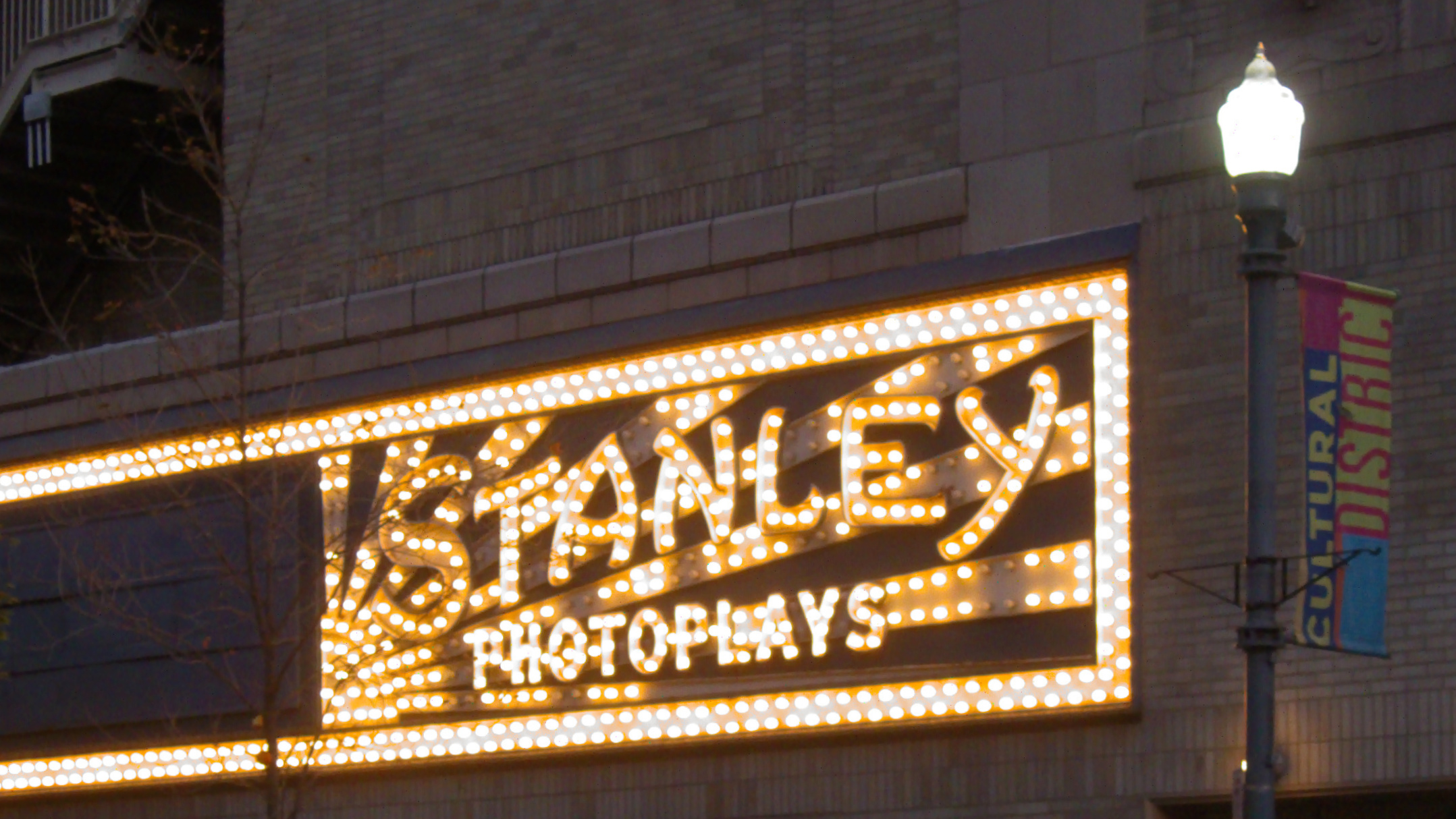
Animated sign from the old Stanley Theater on the Benedum Center

The Stanley Theatre, built at a cost of $3 million, opened as a deluxe movie palace February 27, 1928, with seating for 3,800 people (it now seats 2,885). It was designed by the architectural firm Hoffman−Henon who were best known for their design of 35 theaters in the Philadelphia area. The Stanley Theatre was the largest movie theater in Western Pennsylvania. Initially operated by the Stanley Corporation of America (SCA) it became part of the newly founded Warner Bros. Theatres after the SCA was bought by Warner Bros. Pictures later in 1928. It was Pittsburgh's main first run house for all Warner Bros. film releases.

Frank Sinatra played here December 10, 1943. Following an antitrust lawsuit against Warner Bros., the theatre was sold to the newly formed Stanley Warner Corporation in 1953 when Warner was forced to sell all of its theaters.

In 1974 War and King Crimson played at the Stanley.

On April 29, 1974, the King Biscuit Flower Hour recorded a show at the Stanley by Robin Trower for a later broadcast.

In 1976, the Stanley was purchased and renovated by the Cinemette Corporation to be operated as a movie theater. In 1977, DiCesare Engler Productions bought the theater.

September 23, 1978, Frank Zappa played two sets at the Stanley Theatre.

Live rock and roll concerts presented through 1984.

The Grateful Dead performed five nights at the venue February 7, 1969 (two shows), November 30 & December 1, 1979, and March 5 & 6, 1981; the Jerry Garcia Band played there on March 19, 1978. Reggae musician Bob Marley performed his last live concert there in 1980, before his death in 1981. The only known photographs from the show were featured in Kevin Macdonald's documentary film Marley.

Prince kicked off his Controversy Tour in 1981 at the Stanley. The rock band Kansas chose the Benedum Center to host its 40th Anniversary Fan Appreciation Concert on August 17, 2013, which all the original members were to attend.

The Stanley Theater was named "Number One Auditorium in the U.S." by Billboard several times during the DiCesare-Engler years.

== Restoration ==
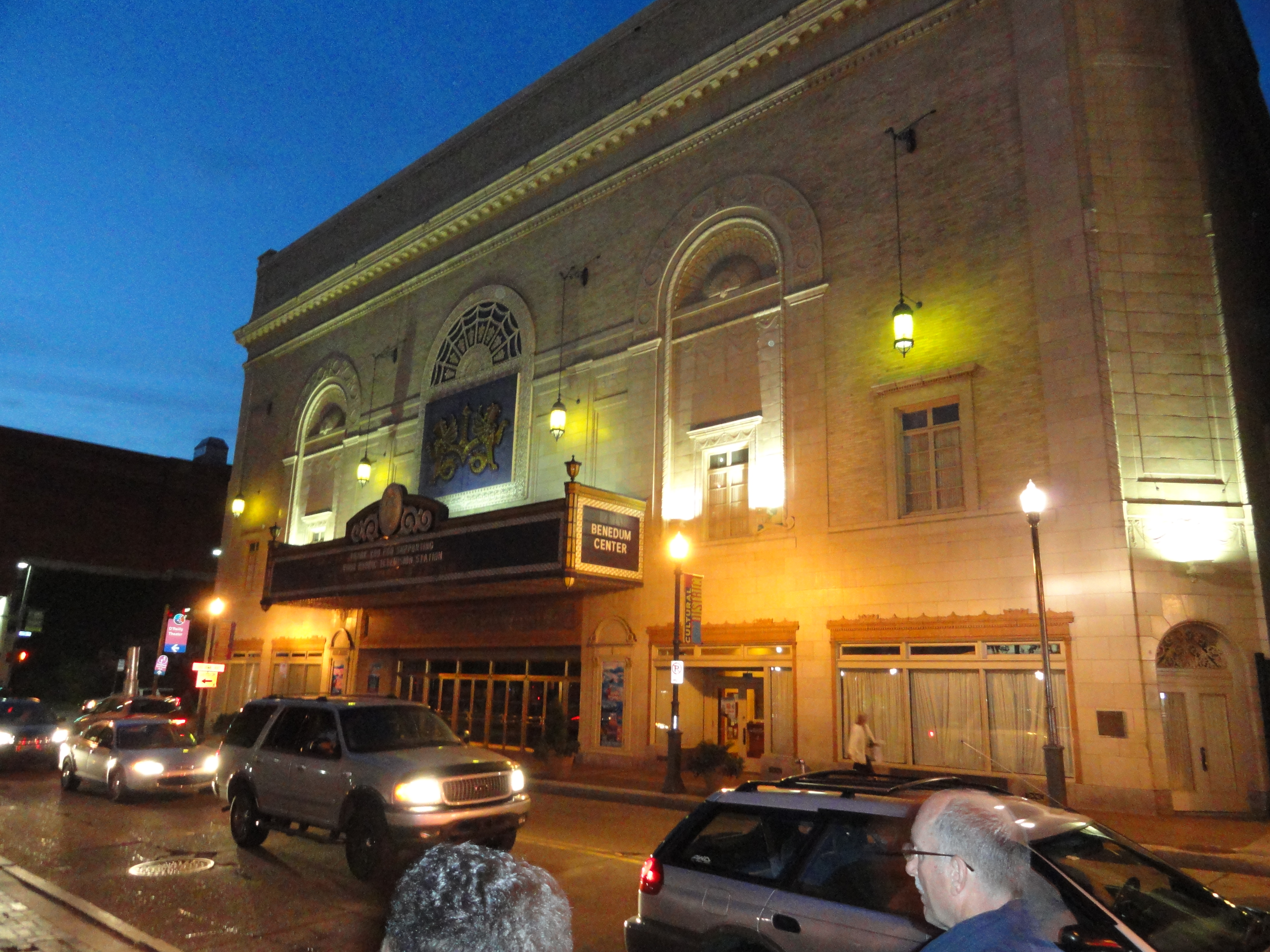
Facade of the Benedum Center

In the 1980s the venue underwent a $43 million restoration, which culminated on September 25, 1987 with its renaming as the Benedum Center for the Performing Arts in honor of the Claude Worthington Benedum Foundation, the project's largest contributor. Part of the conversion of the former movie palace into a full performing arts center was a new building including an extension to the stage and support facilities added at the rear of the theater. The interior was largely preserved and restored to its original design, with the addition of a new acoustical baffle covering the original proscenium.

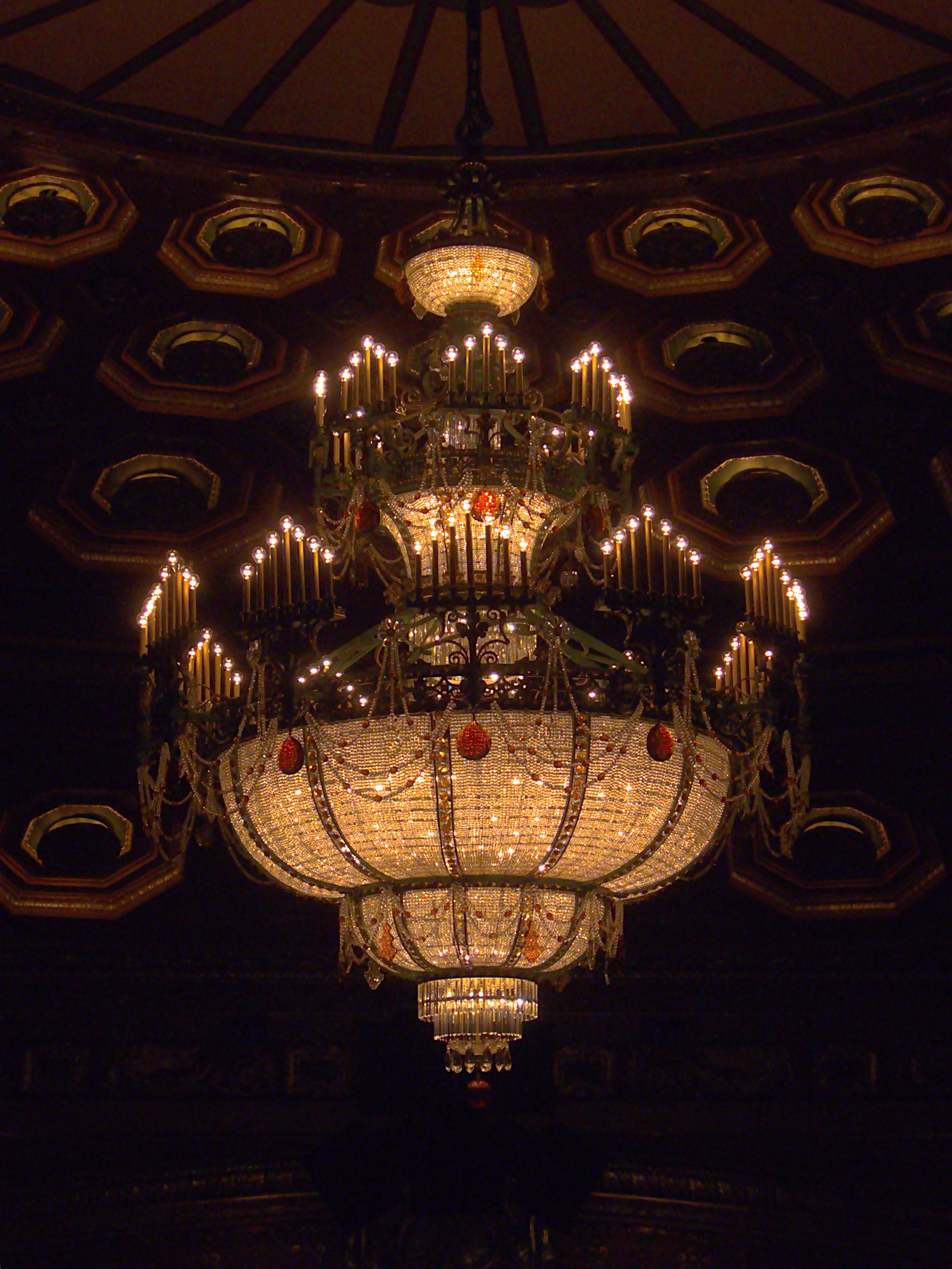
Chandelier in the Benedum Center

The centerpiece of the auditorium is the large chandelier in the dome above the balcony. It weighs 4,700 lb (2,100 kg), is 20 feet (6.1 m) high by 12 feet (3.7 m) wide. Its restoration was dedicated to the late H.J. Heinz II.

The center has hosted several PBS doo-wop television concert specials including Doo Wop 50. The TV game show Wheel of Fortune taped two weeks of shows at the theater for the first two weeks of their 16th season in 1998.

== In popular culture ==
- 2011's Live Forever: September 23, 1980 • Stanley Theatre • Pittsburgh, PA was recorded at the center.
- HBO's Boardwalk Empire mentioned a tap dancing act as having played "the Stanley" in Pittsburgh for three weeks during its season 4 premier.
- The Benedum Center was featured prominently in the 2006 mockumentary film Pittsburgh directed by Jeff Goldblum. The film follows Goldblum's appearances in the Pittsburgh Civic Light Opera production of The Music Man staged at the theater.

== See also ==
- List of concert halls
- Theatre in Pittsburgh
