= Pittsburgh Public Theater =

Theatre company in Pittsburgh, USA

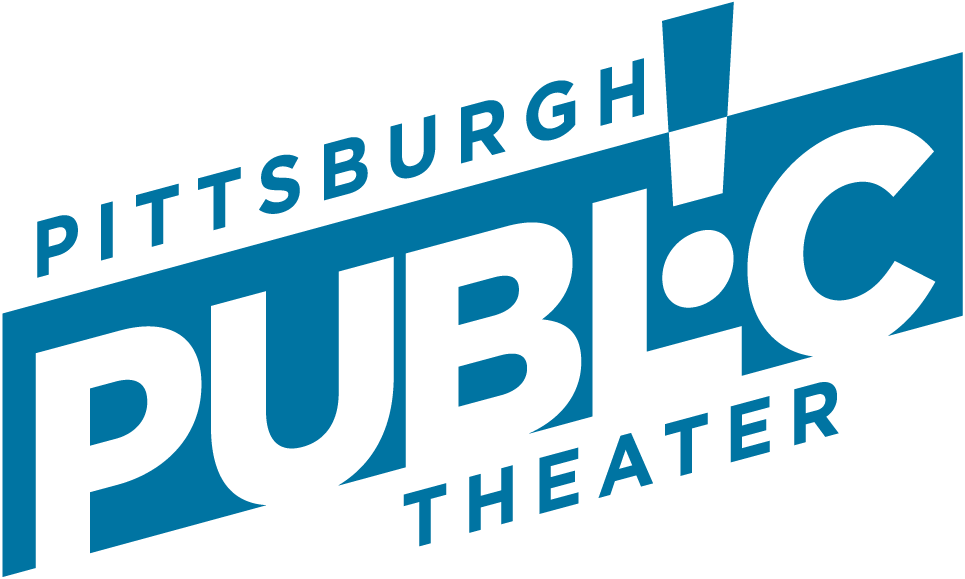
- Address: Pittsburgh Public Theater at The O'Reilly Theater, 621 Penn Avenue, Pittsburgh, PA 15222
- Location: Pittsburgh, Pennsylvania,
- Type: Non-profit theater company

Construction
- Opened: 1974

Website
- ppt.org

Pittsburgh Public Theater, or The Public for short, was a professional theater company located in Pittsburgh, Pennsylvania. The Public celebrates its 50th anniversary in 2024/2025, and is led by Artistic Director Marya Sea Kaminski and Managing Director Shaunda McDill.

Pittsburgh Public Theater annually produces a subscription series that mixes classics, works from Broadway, and musicals. PPT has a rich production history. Pittsburgh Public Theater has been in continuous operation since 1975, first on Pittsburgh's North Side and since 1999 in the O'Reilly Theater, in the heart of Downtown's Cultural District.

The Public has produced several new theatrical works. In addition to the world premiere of August Wilson's King Hedley II, another of his masterworks, Jitney, received its professional premiere at Pittsburgh Public Theater. The pre-Broadway run of Andrew Lloyd Webber and Alan Ayckbourn's By Jeeves was staged at The Public before moving to New York's Helen Hayes Theatre. Other plays which received their world premieres on The Public's stage include Horton Foote's The Habitation of Dragons; Jonathon Bolt and Thomas Tierney's Eleanor; Michael Cristofer's Amazing Grace; Mark Hampton and Barbara Zitwer's Paper Doll; Rob Zellers and Gene Collier's The Chief; Naomi Wallace's Things of Dry Hours; Mark Hampton and Michael Sharp's The Secret Letters of Jackie and Marilyn; and Lynn Ahrens and Stephen Flaherty's musical, The Glorious Ones.

== History (1974-present) ==
1970s

In 1974, Joan Apt and Margaret Rieck created Pittsburgh Public Theater with Ben Shaktman as General Director. The City of Pittsburgh offered the Allegheny Theater to The Public rent free. Grants from 37 corporations, foundations and the state arts council, along with 934 individuals, funded the theater's $370,000 budget. With a grant from the William Randolph Hearst Foundation and a design by Peter Wexler, a flexible stage and audience space with movable scaffold seating for 350 was created. Through strong outreach efforts, 7,100 subscriptions were sold before The Public’s first production opened in 1975.

The first Public Theater production, The Glass Menagerie by Tennessee Williams, starred Carol Teitel and was directed by Ben Shaktman in September 1975. The following month, Tom Atkins made his first appearance as Randle P. McMurphy in One Flew Over the Cuckoo's Nest. The final show of The Public's inaugural three-show season was William Shakespeare's Twelfth Night, which starred Leonard Nimoy as Malvolio. After a successful first season, The Public's second season saw similarly high sales and attendance figures; the theater's production of Sizwe Banzi is Dead by Athol Fugard in October 1976, even saw aspiring playwright August Wilson in attendance. Due to strong ticket sales and many sold-out performances, The Public expanded its season to five productions in 1977.

1980s

In 1980, Howard J. Millman became Executive Director. Meanwhile, the Allegheny Theater was renamed the Theodore L. Hazlett, Jr. Theater in honor of the visionary head of the Mellon Trust. 1980 marked The Public's fifth season, which included a Shaktman-directed production of Macbeth with Tom Atkins in the titular role, Jean Smart as Lady Macbeth, and Keith Fowler as Macduff. After the fifth season, Pittsburgh Public Theater increased its lineup to include six productions in 1981, which is currently the typical quantity of productions in a season.

The Public’s first General Director Ben Shaktman resigned on June 30, 1982. Larry Arrick replaced Shaktman as the Artistic Director of Pittsburgh Public Theater from 1982 to 1984. Additionally, Dennis Babcock replaced Howard J. Millman in the position of Managing Director.

In April 1984, William T. Gardner replaced Arrick as Producing Director at The Public. In the same year, the Hazlett Theater was renovated with a design by L.P. Perfido Associates to increase seating capacity to 471, increase technical capabilities, and enlarge lobby space. In September 1984, legendary actress Sylvia Sidney appeared in Marsha Norman's 'night, Mother, directed by Peter Bennett. The following year, Helena Ruoti made her Public Theater debut in Becoming Memories, written by Arthur Giron and directed by Lee Sankowich.

On Pittsburgh Public Theater's stage in 1988, Horton Foote directed the premiere of his play The Habitation of Dragons. In July 1989, Cloris Leachman appeared in a one-week engagement of Grandma Moses – An American Primitive presented by Pittsburgh Public Theater at the Fulton Theater. Also in the late 1980s, The Public presented its first benefit performance for the Pittsburgh AIDS Task Force. Then, Dan Fallon joined The Public as Managing Director in 1989. During the Public’s 15th season in 1989-1990, the theater had an all-time high subscription base of 16,185.

1990s

In January 1990, Board President Joseph M. Wymard announced The Public's intention to move from the North Side into a new facility Downtown to be built by the Pittsburgh Cultural Trust. Meanwhile, in 1990, the musical Eleanor was directed by Mel Shapiro and choreographed by Rob Marshall. In 1991, future Academy Award and Tony Award winner Mark Rylance graced The Public's stage in the title role in William Shakespeare's Hamlet. In the same year at The Public, Academy Award winner Kim Hunter starred in A. R. Gurney's The Cocktail Hour. In January 1992, 25 Pittsburgh couples celebrating 50 or more years of marriage were honored at a production of popular play I Do! I Do!.

William T. Gardner, Producing Director for eight seasons, died unexpectedly of a heart attack in April 1992. In December, Edward Gilbert of Toronto, Canada was appointed Artistic Director. Stephen Klein was later appointed Managing Director, to share leadership in August 1994.

The Public's 18th season in early 1993 was highlighted by Mad Forest, a play directed by Mark Wing Davey, and playwright Caryl Churchill attended the first preview. The following year, The Public’s future Producing Artistic Director Ted Pappas began directing at The Public with the musical Wings. Also in 1994, the Public’s Education Department organized its first Shakespeare Monologue & Scene Contest for students. In 1995, Amazing Grace, by Michael Cristofer, was directed by Eddie Gilbert and starred Marsha Mason. In the same season, the Reduced Shakespeare Company made its first of several future appearances at the O'Reilly Theater. August Wilson was in residence at Pittsburgh Public Theater in 1996 to rework his play Jitney, one of his most famous masterworks. In 1997, The Public's previous box office records were broken by Over the Tavern, a play by Tom Dudzick.

Seven years after announcing its intent to move into a new Downtown facility, groundbreaking for Pittsburgh Public Theater’s future home began in April 1997. The theater was to be named the O’Reilly Theater for Dr. Anthony O'Reilly, H.J. Heinz Company’s board chairman.

The organization launched the public phase of its $12.8 million capital campaign in September 1998. More than $8.5 million had already been raised during the behind-the-scenes phase. $10 million was earmarked for an income-producing endowment. In December 1998, Artistic Director Eddie Gilbert announced that he would leave The Public in August, 2000. Management Consultant for the Arts, a Greenwich, Conn.-based recruitment firm, was hired to find his replacement.

The O’Reilly Theater era (1999–present)

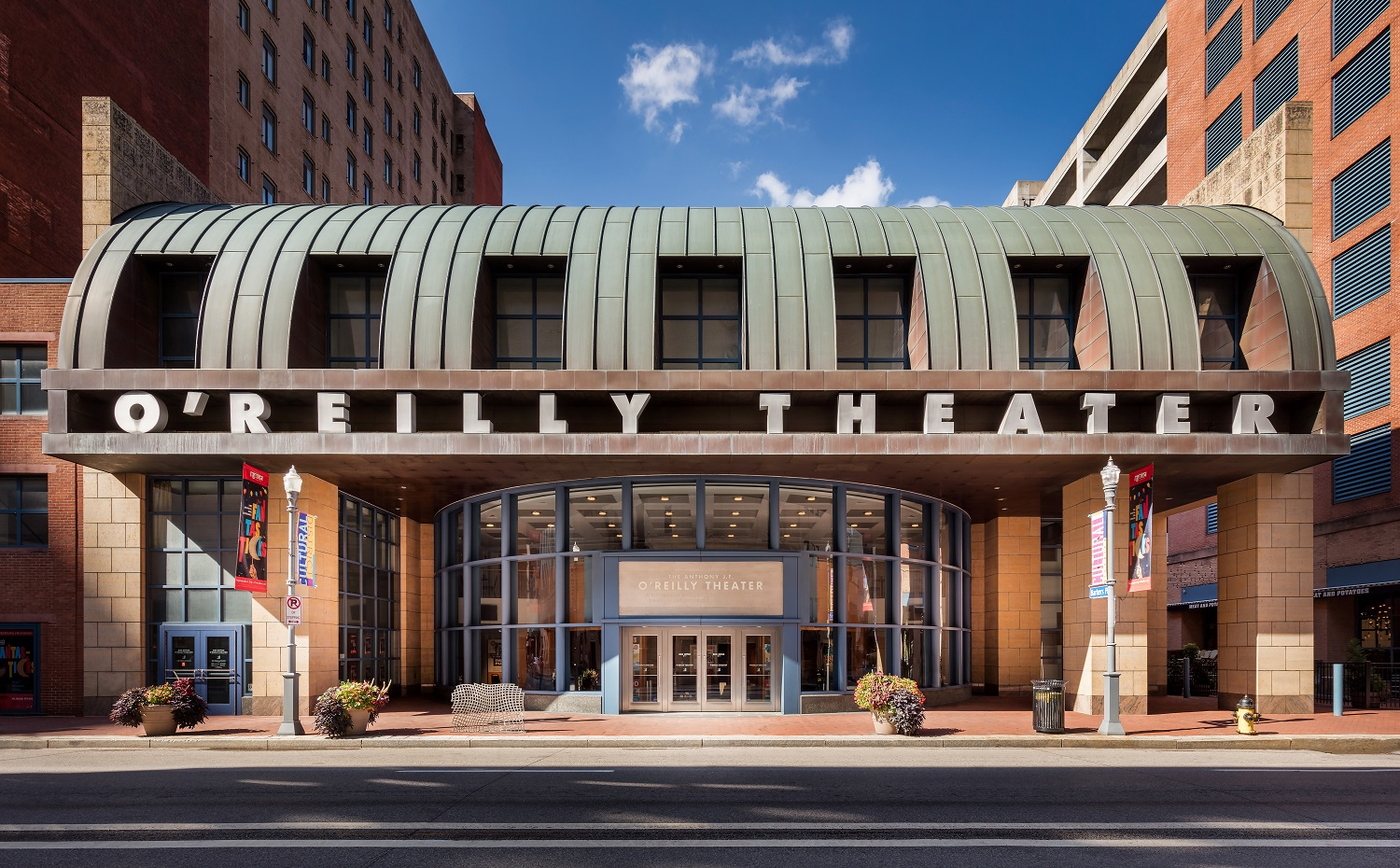
The O'Reilly Theater, with a 650-seat auditorium, has been home to Pittsburgh Public Theater since its opening on December 11, 1999.

After 24 years on the North Side, Pittsburgh Public Theater moved to its current home — the O'Reilly Theater — in the heart of the Downtown Cultural District. On October 4, 1999, The Public announced that Ted Pappas, a director-choreographer who was president of the Society of Stage Directors and Choreographers, would be leading The Public in its brand new facility. The 650-seat venue, designed by architect Michael Graves and built by The Pittsburgh Cultural Trust, opened with the world premiere of August Wilson's King Hedley II in December 1999. The auditorium was named for Barry Rigg Sullivan and the rehearsal hall was named for Helen Wayne Rauh.

Pappas kicked off his first season at The Public with You Can’t Take it With You by Pittsburgh playwright George S. Kaufman and Moss Hart. In February 2001, By Jeeves, an Andrew Lloyd Webber and Alan Ayckbourn production, played at the O'Reilly before its Broadway transfer. Ayckbourn directed and Lloyd Webber worked on the show at The Public. In November of the same year, Academy Award winner F. Murray Abraham and Marlo Thomas starred in the world premiere of Paper Doll written by Mark Hampton and Barbara J. Zitwer. The Public's production of Medea, also in 2001, began a run of classical tragedies at The Public directed by Pappas, who read them first in Greek.

In 2003, The Public saw its biggest box-office success with The Chief, a solo play about the life of Art Rooney Sr. played by Tom Atkins, written by Rob Zellers and Gene Collier and directed by Ted Pappas. Later, the play saw several revivals and a film adaptation due to its local popularity. Also in 2003, Stephen Klein stepped down after nine years as managing director. Ted Pappas became the company’s Producing Artistic Director. In 2005, movie star Haley Mills and Tony Award winner Elizabeth Franz appeared in the U.S. premiere of The Bird Sanctuary by Frank McGuinness. The following year, Pappas directed another U.S. premiere, Alan Ayckbourn’s RolePlay. In 2006, Mark R. Power began as managing director for an 18-month tenure. The Glorious Ones, a new musical by Lynn Ahrens and Pittsburgh native Stephen Flaherty, premiered at Pittsburgh Public Theater in April 2007 before opening Off-Broadway with Lincoln Center Theater.

In 2009, Pappas directed the world premiere of Harry’s Friendly Service by Rob Zellers, who was The Public’s director of education and outreach. Future SNL cast member Cecily Strong performed with The Second City in Second City for President, a politically-themed comedy show, for a three show tour stop at the O'Reilly Theater in the summer of 2012. A production of Our Town, previously performed in 1990 by The Public, was revived in 2013 with a cast consisting entirely of Pittsburgh natives, including Tom Atkins.

In March 2015, Todd Kreidler, a friend and frequent collaborator with August Wilson, directed Eugene Lee in How I Learned What I Learned, a play written by Wilson that explores his own days as a struggling writer in the Hill District. How I Learned What I Learned marked the Public's completion of 11 of Wilson's works, including the American Century Cycle. In 2015 in The Wall Street Journal, Terry Teachout described Pittsburgh Public Theater as, “One of the most accomplished resident theaters on the East Coast.” In 2016, former Pittsburgh Steeler Rocky Bleier starred in biographical one-man show The Play by Gene Collier about Bleier's life. In 2017, television and film actor Zach Grenier fulfilled his dream to play Willy Loman in Death of a Salesman.

In February 2017, The Public introduced new accessibility initiatives using new technology for hearing and sight impaired audiences. On March 9, 2017, Pappas declared his intent to step down as producing artistic director at the end of his contract in August 2018. After the retirement of longtime Producing Artistic Director Ted Pappas, The Public began the 2018–2019 season with a new leadership team: Artistic Director Marya Sea Kaminski and Managing Director Lou Castelli.

To open its 49th season, Pittsburgh Public Theater staged the world premiere of a new musical by Kent Gash (artistic director of The Acting Company) and Rob Zellers, Billy Strayhorn: Something To Live For, about the Pittsburgh-native jazz legend Billy Strayhorn, produced by Billy Porter.

Shaunda McDill was named Managing Director in February 2023, and The Public celebrates its 50th season in 2024/2025.

== World Premieres ==
- 1977: Balyasnikov, by Aleksei Arbuzov (Season 3)
- 1981: Tangles, by Robert Litz (Season 6)
- 1982: Tom Jones, adapted by Larry Arrick, Music & Songs by Barbara Damashek (Season 8)
- 1987: Princess Grace and the Fazzaris, by Alan Zagoren (Season 12)
- 1988: Edith Stein, by Arthur Giron (Season 13)
- 1988: My Heart Belongs to Daddy, by Laury Marker and Nelsie Spencer (Season 13)
- 1988: The Habitation of Dragons, by Horton Foote (also directed) (Season 14)
- 1990: Eleanor, Book by Jonathon Bolt, Music by Thomas Tierney, Lyrics by John Forester (Season 15)
- 1991: The Lay of the Land, by Mel Shapiro (Season 16)
- 1991: A Sunbeam, by John Henry Redwood (Season 16)
- 1995: Amazing Grace, by Michael Cristofer (Season 21)
- 1996: Jitney, by August Wilson (Season 22)
- 1998: Reduced Shakespeare Company in The Millennium Musical (Season 24)
- 1999: King Hedley II, by August Wilson (Season 25)
- 2001: Paper Doll, by Mark Hampton and Barbara J. Zitwer (Season 27)
- 2003: The Chief, by Rob Zellers and Gene Collier (Season 29)
- 2004: Things of Dry Hours, by Naomi Wallace (Season 29)
- 2006: The Secret Letters of Jackie and Marilyn, by Mark Hampton and Michael Sharp (Season 32)
- 2007: The Glorious Ones, Book and Lyrics by Lynn Ahrens, Music by Stephen Flaherty (Season 32)
- 2009: Harry's Friendly Service, by Rob Zellers (Season 34)
- 2014: L'Hotel, by Ed Dixon (Season 40)
- 2023: Young Americans, by Lauren Yee (Season 48)
- 2024: Billy Strayhorn: Something to Live For, by Rob Zellers and Kent Gash (Season 49)

== See also ==
Theatre in Pittsburgh
