= O'Reilly Theater =

Theater in Pittsburgh, Pennsylvania, US

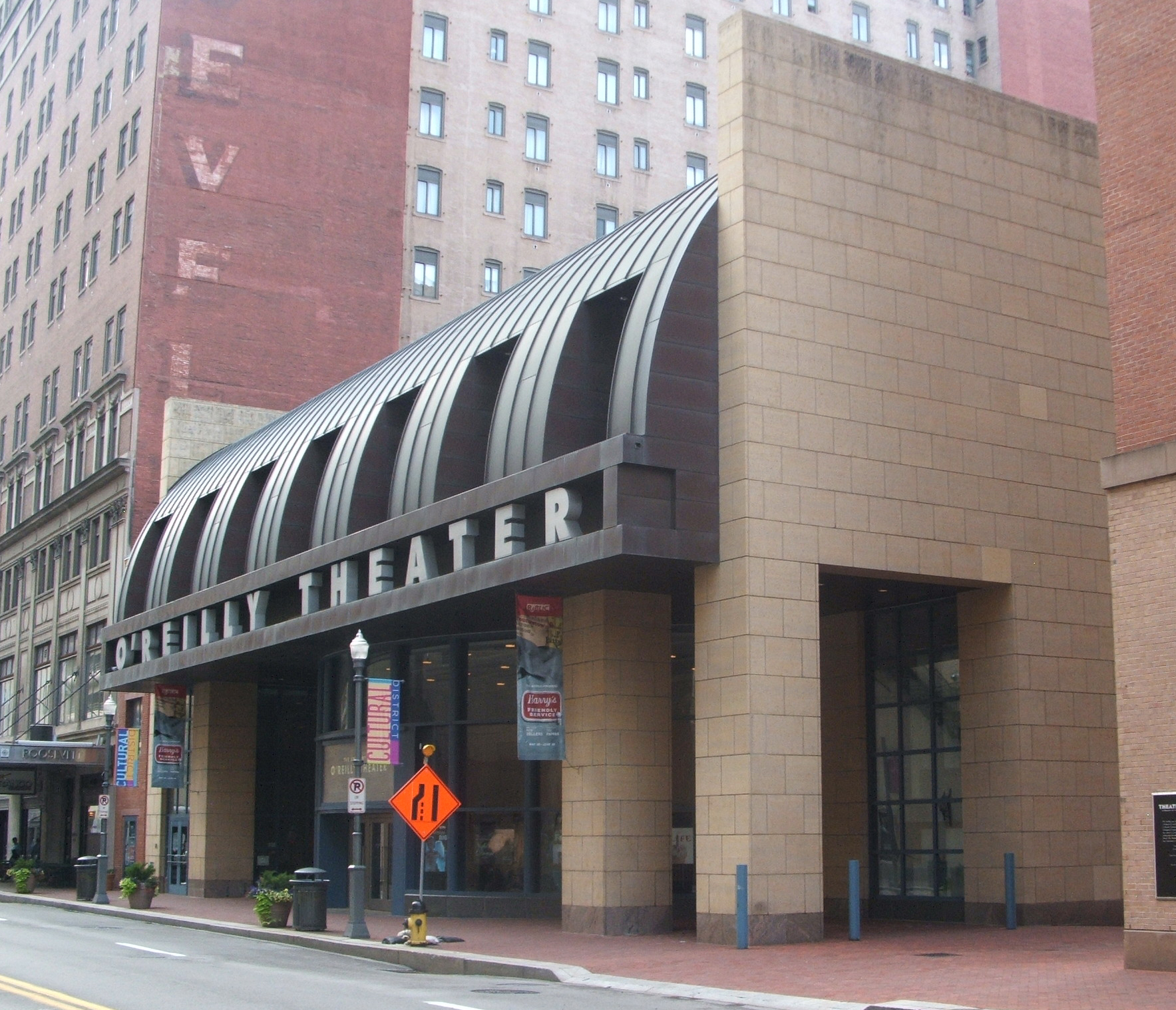
- Interactive map of O'Reilly Theater
- Address: 621 Penn Avenue; Pittsburgh, Pennsylvania; United States
- Coordinates: 40.4432°N 80.0016°W
- Owner: Pittsburgh Cultural Trust
- Capacity: 650

Construction
- Opened: 11 December 1999
- Architect: Michael Graves
- Structural engineer: DeSimone Consulting Engineers

Website
- www.trustarts.org

The O'Reilly Theater is a 650-seat theater building, opened on 11 December 1999, in Pittsburgh, Pennsylvania. Located at 621 Penn Avenue in downtown Pittsburgh's Cultural District, the O'Reilly Theater is actually a three-part building: The 65,000 square feet (6,000 m^{2}) theater (with a 150-seat rehearsal hall), a large parking garage called Theater Square, and the adjacent 23,000 square feet (2,100 m^{2}) Agnes R. Katz Plaza.

The Pittsburgh Cultural Trust built the new theater, designed by architect Michael Graves P.A., to create a downtown home for the Pittsburgh Public Theater theatrical company, as well as to create additional venues for theater, music, and other art performances. The O’Reilly venue features a thrust stage surrounded by the audience on three sides.

To pay for the $25 million cost of construction, gifts to the project included a naming gift in honor of Dr. Anthony O'Reilly from Mrs. Chryss O'Reilly and several current and past senior executives of Heinz.

The O’Reilly was built by Turner Construction Company, opened on 11 December 1999, with the world premiere of King Hedley II, by the Pulitzer Prize winning playwright August Wilson.

== Pittsburgh Mercantile Library ==
The site of the O'Reilly Theater was previously occupied by the Mercantile Library Hall, which was completed in 1870. The four-story building housed a subscription library, a 1,500-seat auditorium, and commercial space. The Joseph Horne Company department store was a tenant of the building before completing its own building one block to the west in 1893.

== Lyceum Theater ==
The Library Hall was remodeled in 1886, reopening as the Bijou Theater. The Bijou was replaced by a succession of vaudeville and burlesque houses—the Lyceum, academy, and Variety—and then was razed and paved into a parking lot after being damaged in the 1936 St. Patrick's Day flood. Teddy Roosevelt spoke at a national convention of the Order of the Moose at Lyceum Theater on his visit to Pittsburgh in July, 1917.

== See also ==
Theatre in Pittsburgh
