= William Rea (real estate magnate) =

William Rea (1912–2006) was an American real estate magnate and civic leader in Pittsburgh, Pennsylvania.

A key collaborator with H. J. Heinz II in the creation of Pittsburgh's Cultural District, he also served in a leadership capacity on the boards of directors of the Pennsylvania State Board of Education, Pittsburgh Public Schools, the University of Pittsburgh, Princeton University and the Heinz Endowments.

== Formative years ==
Born in Pittsburgh, Pennsylvania in 1912, Rea was a son of James Childs Rea, the general manager of the Oliver Iron & Steel Company, and Julia Dodge Rea.

He grew up in the Squirrel Hill neighborhood of Pittsburgh, attended the Wightman School and the Shady Side Academy, before pursuing history studies at, and then graduating from, Princeton University.

According to his obituary in the Pittsburgh Post-Gazette, he subsequently "served in the Navy from 1942 to 1945, and was a radar officer on the battleship USS Idaho when Japan signed the surrender on the nearby USS Missouri."

== Career ==
Rea began his career as an English teacher at the American University of Beirut, then took on management roles at Edgewater Steel Company and W. R. Grace and Company. He entered into his real estate development career with the Henry W. Oliver Estate.

Rea also collaborated with H. J. Heinz II in establishing Pittsburgh's Cultural District. A member of the Pennsylvania State Board of Education, he also served on the boards of directors of the Pittsburgh Public Schools, the University of Pittsburgh, Princeton University, and the Heinz Endowments.

During his later years, Rea lived in Stahlstown, Pennsylvania.

== Death ==
Predeceased by his wife, Ingrid (Shellabarger) Rea, in 2003, Rea suffered a heart attack while visiting Washington, D.C. and died there on May 15, 2006.

== Honors ==
In 1974, Rea was the recipient of the distinguished service award from Phelps Dodge Industries.

In 1998, Rea was presented with the Community Service Human Rights Award by the American Jewish Committee.
