= Allegheny Conference =

Nonprofit, private sector leadership organization

- Founded: 1944 (82 years ago)
- Purpose: Regional development & commerce
- Location(s): 11 Stanwix Street; Pittsburgh, Pennsylvania
- Region served: Pittsburgh metropolitan area
- Key people: Stefani Pashman, CEO
- Website: AlleghenyConference.com

The Allegheny Conference on Community Development is a nonprofit, private sector leadership organization dedicated to economic development and quality of life issues for a 10-county region in southwestern Pennsylvania, United States centered around the largest city in the region, Pittsburgh, Pennsylvania.

It grew from efforts in the 1940s to coordinate improvements to regional transportation and the local environment. During World War II, the Pittsburgh Regional Planning Association President Richard King Mellon, Carnegie Institute of Technology President Robert Doherty, and others organized local leaders to create a postwar planning committee. Pittsburgh Mayor David L. Lawrence and Allegheny County Commissioner John Kane were early recruits. The Allegheny Conference was officially established in 1944.

The city's most visible problem in the first half of the 20th century was air pollution. The Conference brokered an agreement for phased-in implementation of smoke control that became city policy. After the Conference voiced its concern for legal loopholes to the state legislature in Harrisburg, Pennsylvania, a comprehensive anti-pollution law was passed in 1949 for Allegheny County.

The clearer skies over the city both attracted new business and encouraged local corporations to retain and expand their Pittsburgh headquarters. The pollution-control program explicitly influenced the decision of the Equitable Life Assurance Society to invest in planning the Gateway Center project, a keystone of economic revitalization in Downtown Pittsburgh during Renaissance I. This also led to the development of Point State Park. The Conference also played a role in the appropriation of funds for the construction of flood control dams on the Allegheny and Monongahela rivers.

In the 1940s and 1950s, mass transit in Allegheny County was in jeopardy because of 40 private transit companies and increased competition from cars. The Conference released a report in 1951 calling for all local transit lines to be under one authority. Public suspicions and private interests delayed the measure until service cutbacks and strikes rekindled the idea in 1957. The Conference was instrumental in building public and private support. In 1959, legislation was passed to create the Port Authority of Allegheny County, and the first buses were rolling in 1964.

Allegheny Conference is a longtime partner with the RIDC. In 1981 it formed the Regional Economic Development Committee with the RIDC that included "18 of the region's top corporate executives".

The Conference also led the transformation of the 14-block Penn-Liberty Corridor into the Pittsburgh Cultural District. A related effort was Strategy 21 that enabled public and private agencies in Allegheny County to speak with one voice when requesting state funds. Strategy 21 not only resulted in projects that ranged from the new Pittsburgh International Airport to The Andy Warhol Museum.

In 2001, the Conference entered into a strategic affiliation with the Greater Pittsburgh Chamber of Commerce, the Pennsylvania Economy League of Southwestern Pennsylvania, and the Pittsburgh Regional Alliance (PRA), with the four organizations merging many staff positions in 2003.

== CEOs ==
- 1 – Willard E. Hotchkiss - 1944 - 1945
- 2 – Park H. Martin – 1945 – 1958
- 3 – Edward J. Magee – 1958 – 1968
- 4 – Robert B. Pease – 1968 – 1991
- 5 – Rick Stafford – 1991 – 2003
- 6 – Michael Langley – 2003 – 2008
- 7 – Dennis Yablonsky – 2008 – 2017
- 8 – Stefani Pashman – 2017 – 2026
