= Harris Theater (Pittsburgh) =

Movie theater in Pittsburgh, Pennsylvania, United States

Coordinates: 40.4430°N 79.9987°W

- Avenue Cinema, Art Cinema
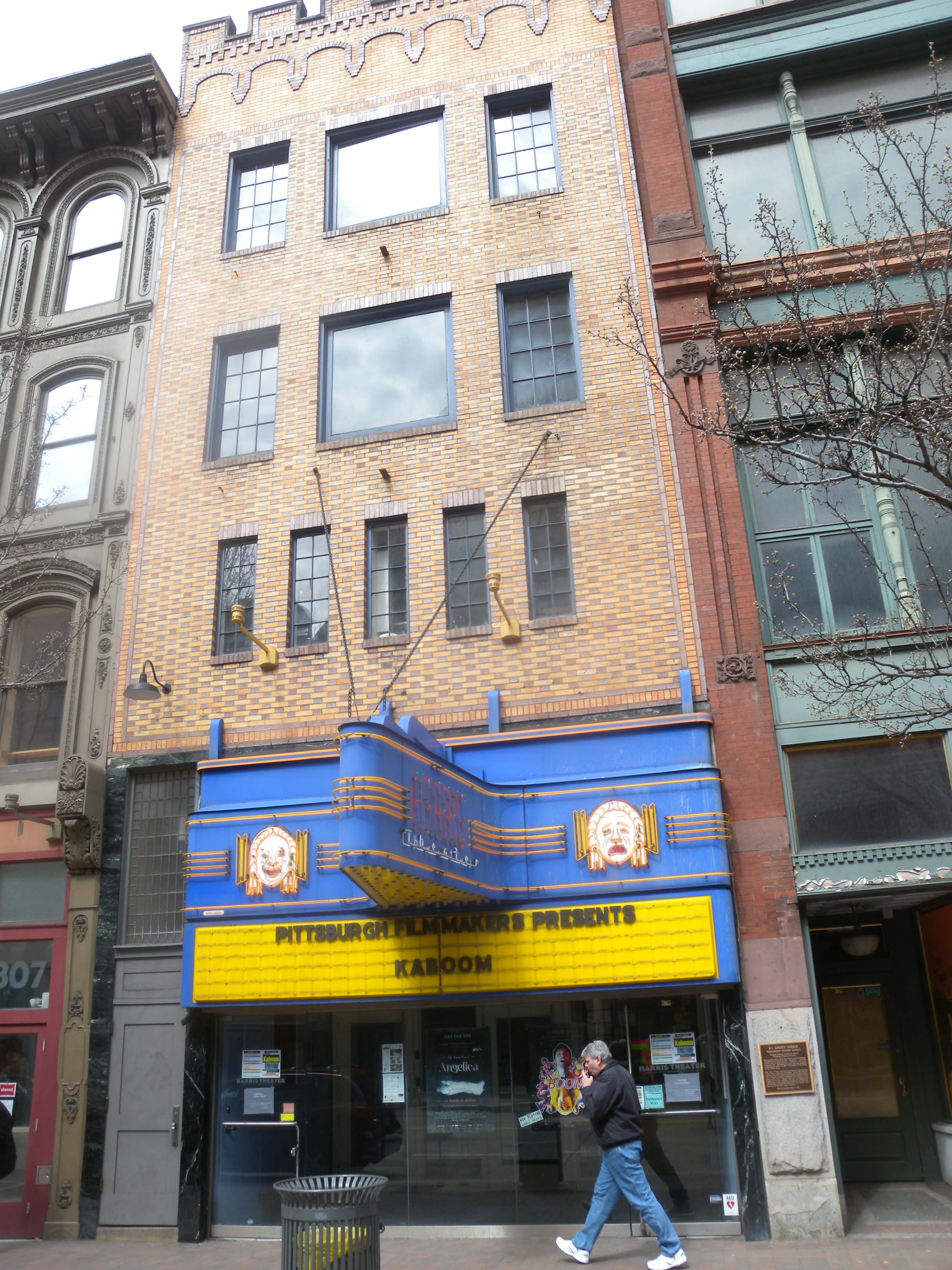
- Interactive map of Harris Theater
- Address: 809 Liberty Avenue; Pittsburgh, Pennsylvania; United States
- Operator: Pittsburgh Cultural Trust
- Capacity: 200
- Type: Cinema
- Screen: 1

Construction
- Opened: September 14, 1931
- Reopened: November 9, 1995

Tenant
- Pittsburgh Cultural Trust

Website
- trustarts.org

The Harris Theater is a landmark building which is located at 809 Liberty Avenue in Downtown Pittsburgh, Pennsylvania's Cultural District. The 200-seat theater is owned and operated by the Pittsburgh Cultural Trust.

== History and architectural features ==
Built as Art Cinema, it was the first Pittsburgh venue to show only "art movies". During the 1960s, it featured pornographic films at a time when Liberty Avenue was a red-light district. The Pittsburgh Cultural Trust purchased and refurbished the theater as part of its plan for the Cultural District.

In 1995, it was renamed The Harris, using a gift from the Buhl Foundation, in honor of John P. Harris, who was a co-founder of the Nickelodeon—the first theater solely dedicated to the showing of motion pictures—and a Pennsylvania State Senator. The name "Nickelodeon" was coined by Harry Davis and John P. Harris, who opened their small, storefront theatre under that name on Smithfield Street in Pittsburgh in June 1905. Davis and Harris found such great success that their concept of a five cent theatre running movies continuously was soon imitated by other entrepreneurs, as was the name of the theatre itself.
