= August Wilson African American Cultural Center =

Performing arts and cultural center in Pittsburgh, Pennsylvania

- August Wilson Center
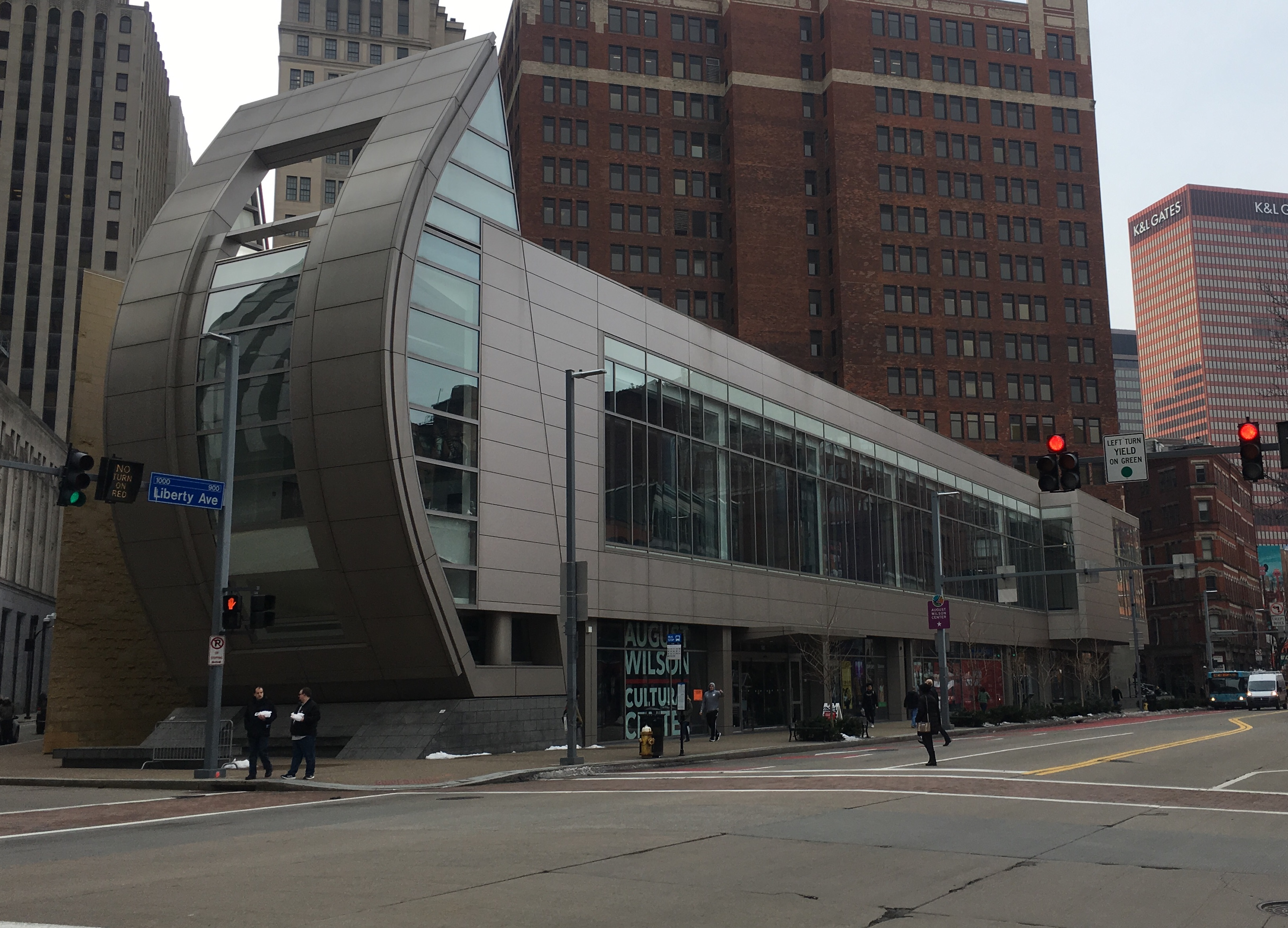
- August Wilson African American Cultural Center in Pittsburgh, Pennsylvania
- Interactive map of August Wilson African American Cultural Center
- Former names: August Wilson Center for African American Culture (2009–2019)
- Address: 980 Liberty Avenue; Pittsburgh, Pennsylvania; United States
- Coordinates: 40.4433°N 79.9957°W
- Owner: August Wilson African American Cultural Center
- Capacity: 472
- Type: Theater
- Current use: Performing arts center

Construction
- Opened: September 17, 2009
- Architects: Allison G. Williams, Perkins and Will

Website
- aacc-awc.org

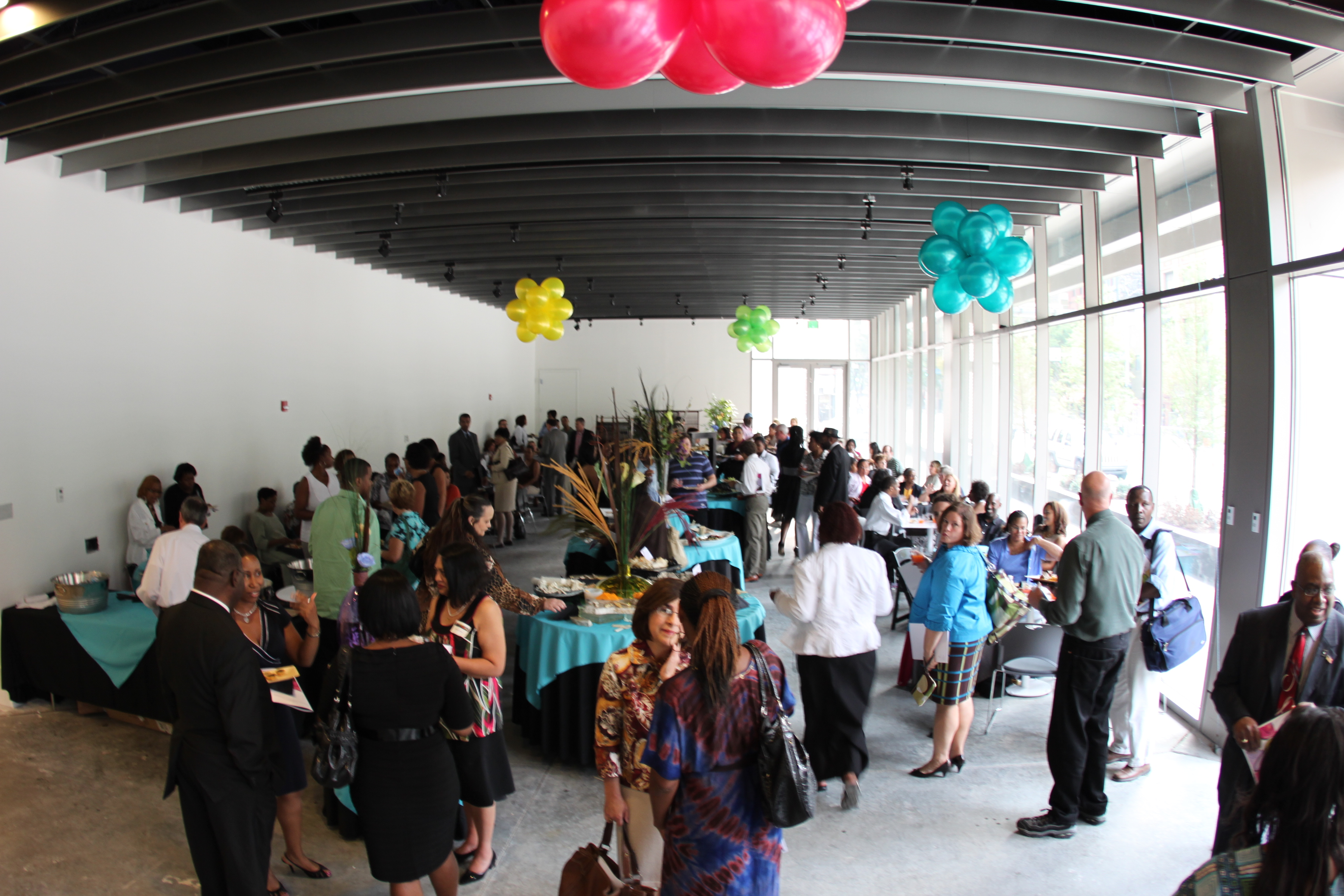
The 2009 grand opening

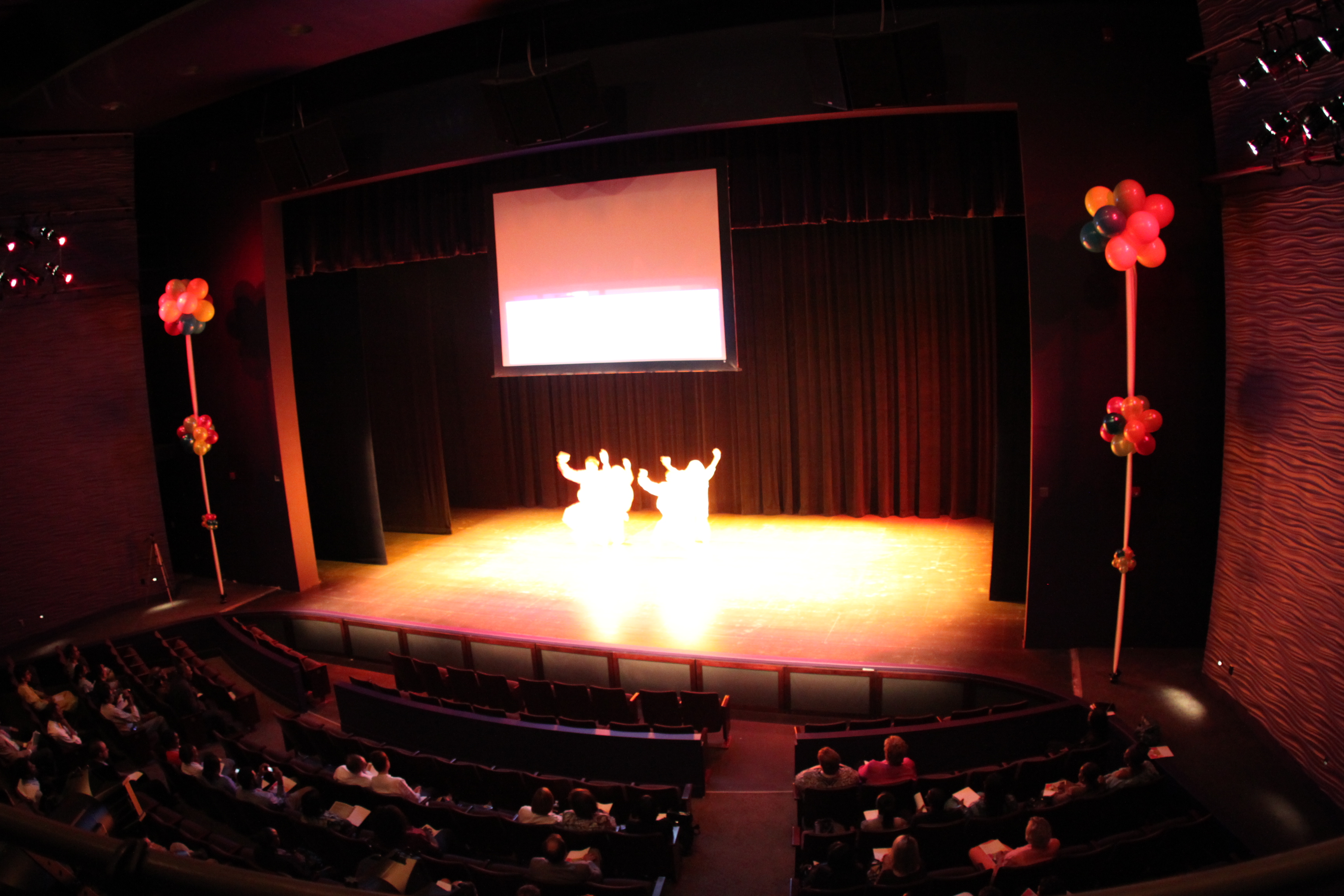
The stage

The August Wilson African American Cultural Center is a U.S. nonprofit arts organization based in Pittsburgh, Pennsylvania, that presents performing and visual arts programs that celebrate the contributions of African Americans not only in Western Pennsylvania, but nationally and internationally.

The August Wilson African American Cultural Center building is on Liberty Avenue in Downtown Pittsburgh's Cultural District. It includes galleries, classrooms, a 500-seat theater, a gift shop, a cafe, and many multi-purpose spaces for visual and performing art. The museum opened in 2009.

== History ==
The August Wilson Center was part of a plan drawn up by Pittsburgh NAACP President Tim Stevens in 1996 in order to try to bring the National NAACP Convention to Pittsburgh. In the plan, there was a statement that urged the Mayor of Pittsburgh to provide financial backing for an African American Museum. Later in 1996, then-Mayor Tom Murphy charged two City Council Members, Sala Udin and Valerie McDonald with bringing stakeholders together to discuss the museum's future. Funding from various sources, including the URA, State of Pennsylvania, and The Heinz Endowments came together to begin construction of the center. The land on which the center sits was taken by eminent domain and sold to the museum for $1. The center celebrated its "topping off" ceremony on August 12, 2008, at 12:30 pm. Construction was completed shortly thereafter and the museum was open to the full public on September 17 and 19, 2009.

The August Wilson Center was designed under the direction of Allison G. Williams, FAIA and members of her team from her San Francisco office of Perkins and Will. During the design of this project, AI merged with MBT Architecture and then was subsequently bought by Perkins+Will. The project design was completed in the San Francisco office of Perkins+Will. Team members included Greg Lehman, Sally Curtis, Stacie Velten.

In February 2019, the August Wilson Center for African American Culture (the center's original name) changed its name to the August Wilson Cultural Center, and the following month, to the August Wilson African American Cultural Center (the latter change, following an online petition objecting to the deletion of "African American" from its name).

== Debt troubles ==
The center struggled to pay off its construction debt from 2012, on January 20, 2014, a federal bankruptcy official reported that the center's debt situation might be irreversible. Subsequently, a federal court ruled on January 27, 2014, that the center's liquidation could begin to pay off debts.

In February 2014 concerned stakeholders started a website to raise funds for the center. After numerous court cases, the center was sold at a sheriff's sale on November 3, 2014, to the mortgage holder, Dollar Bank for $1,912.50.

On November 5, 2014 Dollar Bank sold the center to a nonprofit consortium for $7.9 million. The consortium included contributions from private foundations: $2.45 million from the Heinz Endowments, $2.35 million from the Richard King Mellon Foundation, $500,000 from the Pittsburgh Foundation and $500,000 from the Thomas Tull Family Foundation. Public sources contributed another $3.15 million: $1.65 million from the Urban Redevelopment Authority and $1.5 million from the Allegheny Regional Asset District.

The court-appointed conservator had originally agreed to sell the building for $9.5 million to a private developer, 980 Liberty Partners, who had planned to build a hotel on top of the center. Pittsburgh Major Bill Peduto, Allegheny County Executive Rich Fitzgerald and the URA fought the bid. 980 Liberty Partners withdrew in a September 2014 settlement that favored the consortium of local foundations. 980 Liberty partners was reimbursed $360,000 from URA's share of the purchase price.

By 2019, the center was on a solid financial foundation, having ended 2018 with a budget surplus and was building a capital reserve. By 2020, the center was showing additional signs of recovery, having increased its operating budget to $7.25 million from $1.77 million in 2015 and increased the percentage of the budget coming from earned income to 17% from 5%. The center had greatly increased its individual donor base and held substantially more events.
