= Barbara Zitwer =

American dramatist

- Occupations: Film producer, playwright, novelist and literary agent
- Writing career
- Genre: Horror/biography
- Website: www.barbarajzitweragency.com

Barbara J Zitwer is an American film producer, playwright and literary agent.

She started her career as a still photographer and location co-ordinator on Larry Cohen's 1984 horror movie Special Effects. In 1985 she worked as a location scout on The Stuff, and was the associate producer of 1987's It's Alive III: Island of the Alive. She produced the 1988 Nicolas Cage film Vampire's Kiss. and was the associate producer of the 1990 movie The Ambulance. She was an executive producer on Lazarus Rising with Columbia Tri-Star.

Zitwer co-wrote the play Paper Doll, with Mark Hampton, about writer Jacqueline Susann. The play was produced in regional theatres across the US. She was also the executive co-executive producer of the 1998 TV movie Scandalous Me: The life of Jacqueline Susann, for the USA Network.

In 1995, Zitwer formed her own literary and film agency in New York City. Books handled by her agency include The Friday Night Knitting Club, Matchstick Men, Notes from the Underbelly, Socrates in Love and The Serial Killers Club.
