= Three Rivers Arts Festival =

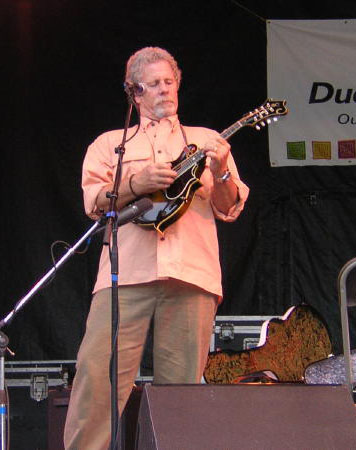
- Chris Hillman performing at the Three Rivers Arts Festival on June 16, 2004.
- Genre: all types
- Dates: June
- Locations: (United States) Pittsburgh, Pennsylvania
- Years active: Since 1959
- Founders: The Women's Committee of the Carnegie Museum of Art in cooperation with a cross section of Pittsburgh business and cultural leaders.
- Website: Three Rivers Arts Festival homepage

Three Rivers Arts Festival is an outdoor music and arts festival held each June in the Downtown district of Pittsburgh, Pennsylvania. The festival features live music and performance art, as well as visual art and vendors who sell their wares. The event is centered in Point State Park.

Founded in 1960 by the Women's Committee of the Carnegie Museum of Art, the festival has presented more than 10,000 visual and performing artists. Stage performances have included Ella Fitzgerald, Ray Charles, Philip Glass, Steven Reich, Smokey Robinson as well as literary legends Allen Ginsberg and Spalding Gray.

Since 2015, the CREATE festival has been part of the Three Rivers Arts Festival.

Most outdoor events were cancelled in 2020 due to the COVID-19 pandemic; some went virtual.

The Three Rivers Arts Festival Gallery, located at 937 Liberty Avenue, is a year-round extension of the Three Rivers Arts Festival.
