= Pittsburgh Opera =

Pittsburgh's Opera company and venue

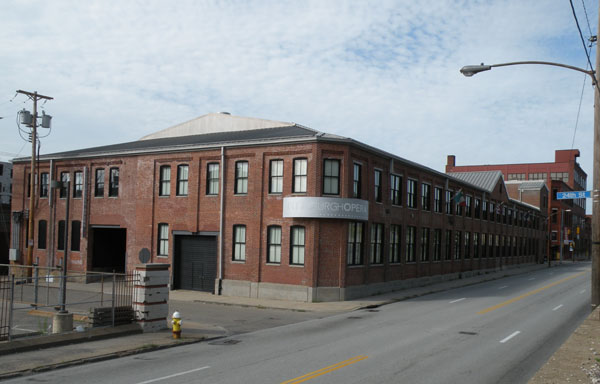
- The Pittsburgh Opera Building
- Established: 1939; 87 years ago
- Type: Nonprofit
- Tax ID no.: 25-1073139
- Headquarters: 2425 Liberty Avenue; Pittsburgh, Pennsylvania
- Coordinates: 40.453250°N 79.979770°W
- General Director: William J. Powers
- Music Director: Antony Walker
- Budget: $6,200,000 (2021)
- Website: pittsburghopera.org

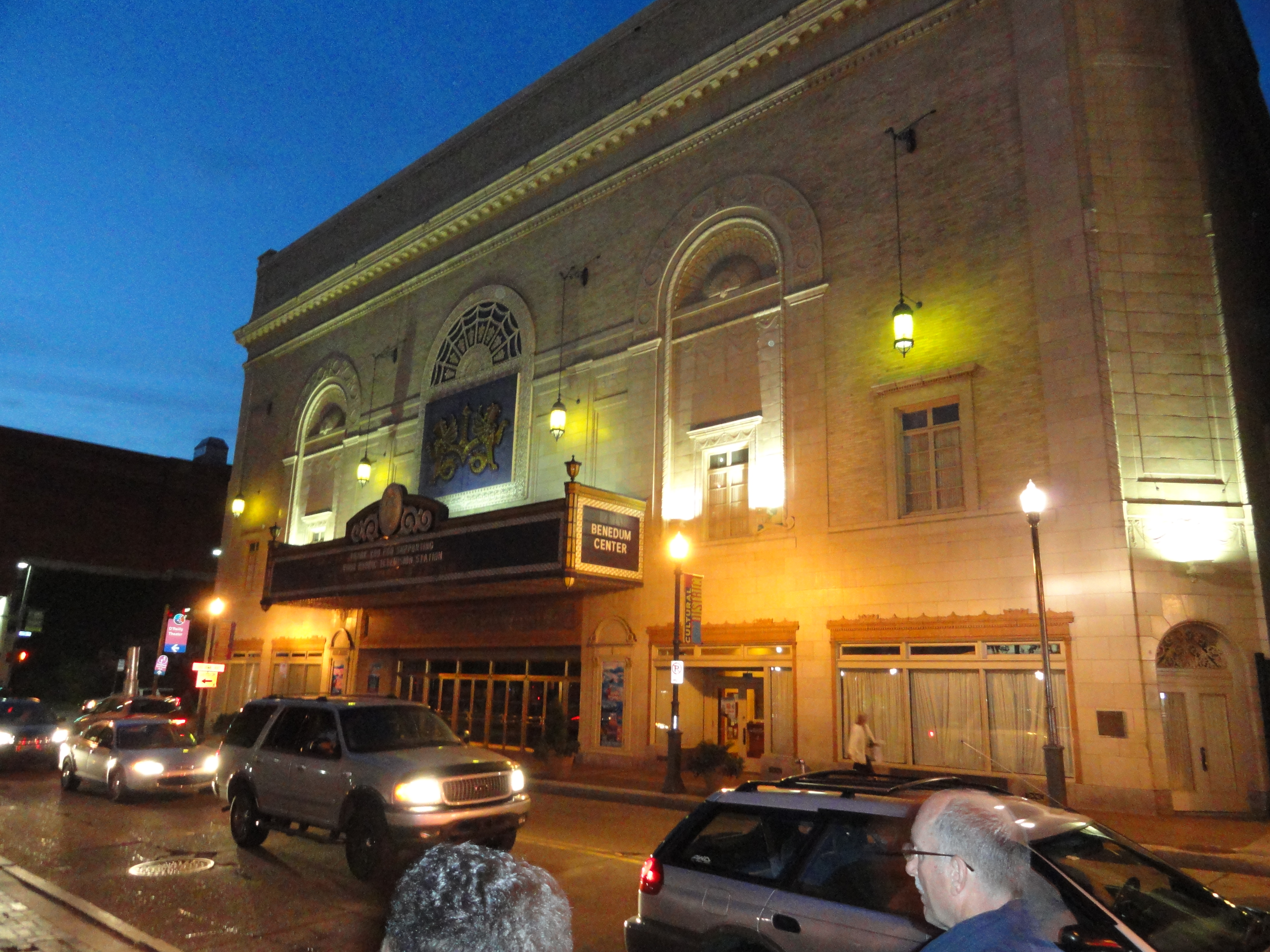
The opera's main performance venue, the Benedum Center

Pittsburgh Opera is an American opera company based in Pittsburgh, Pennsylvania. Pittsburgh Opera gives performances in several venues, primarily at the Benedum Center, with other performances at the Pittsburgh Creative and Performing Arts School (CAPA) Theater. Pittsburgh Opera headquarters is located in the former George Westinghouse Air Brake Factory, 2425 Liberty Avenue, in the Strip District. Pittsburgh Opera has been awarded LEED Silver Certification by the U.S. Green Building Council and is the first "green" opera company in the U.S. in the Operations and Maintenance Category. Pittsburgh Opera's headquarters is also the oldest green building in Pittsburgh.

== History ==
Pittsburgh Opera was established in 1939 as the Pittsburgh Opera Company and is the eighth-oldest opera company in the United States. The company was founded by five women who established the Pittsburgh Opera Society in 1939, making possible the inaugural performance of Offenbach's Les Contes d'Hoffmann at the Carnegie Music Hall in March 1940. The first director of the company was Richard Karp, from 1942 to 1977. His daughter Barbara Karp took over her father's duties during his final illness. James DeBlasis then served as interim artistic director after the resignation of Barbara Karp. In 1983, Tito Capobianco became Pittsburgh Opera's general director, holding this position until 1997. From 1997 to 2000, Capobianco was the company's artistic director, before leaving in 2000.

Mark Weinstein became general director of Pittsburgh Opera in 1999, after starting as executive director in 1997. During his tenure, he presided over an increase in the company's endowment from US $4 million to US $16 million, as well as the retirement of US $2.5 million in debt. Weinstein also presided over the addition of an extra production during the company season, 5 productions as opposed to 4, from the 2001-2002 season to the 2003-2004 season. Weinstein announced his resignation as Pittsburgh Opera's general director effective February 1, 2008. Artistic Director Christopher Hahn was appointed as General Director in June 2008.

During Christopher Hahn’s tenure as General Director, the company’s repertoire expanded considerably to include Baroque and many contemporary works. In 2017 Pittsburgh Opera produced its first world premiere, The Summer King – the Josh Gibson Story. Based on the life and tragic death of the Hall of Fame baseball player who grew up in Pittsburgh and starred for the Homestead Grays and Pittsburgh Crawfords, The Summer King featured bass-baritone Alfred Walker in the role of Josh Gibson and acclaimed mezzo-soprano Denyce Graves as his love-interest Grace.

Mr. Hahn has expanded Pittsburgh Opera’s prestigious Resident Artist Program to include two annual productions, both of which are offered as part of the full subscription series. Hailed as one of the country's leading training programs for young singers, Pittsburgh Opera’s Resident Artist Program provides professional development during a two-year session. The program has fostered the careers of singers that regularly perform on the world stage, including Marianne Cornetti, Rolando Villazón, Oren Gradus, David Miller, Maria Zifchak, Kevin Glavin, Danielle Pastin, Sean Panikkar, and Audrey Luna. In 2017, Luna sang the highest note ever recorded in the Metropolitan Opera’s 130-year history.

Mr. Hahn also led the 2008 move to Pittsburgh Opera’s new headquarters in the historic George Westinghouse Air Brake Factory at 2425 Liberty Avenue, in Pittsburgh’s Strip District, and developed a range of audience and community programs that take place there. The building has a deep connection to Pittsburgh’s storied past – it was built as George Westinghouse’s original air brake factory in 1869. At 45,000 square feet, the renovated building features offices, 4,000 square feet of rehearsal spaces, costume, wig, and makeup shops, and a kitchen, meeting the “multimedia” requirements of opera. The renovation resulted in Silver-level LEED certification in the Operations and Maintenance category in June 2011, and incorporates the site’s exposed brick interiors, 150 historically-accurate windows and original metal fire safes.

Christopher Hahn served as the company's artistic director from 2000 until his appointment as General Director. John Mauceri was Music Director of Pittsburgh Opera from 2000 until his resignation in 2006, to take up an academic post in North Carolina. In October 2006, Antony Walker was named the next Music Director of Pittsburgh Opera, and assumed the post immediately. Walker's initial contract was for 3 years, but has since been extended through the 2011-12 season. On April 1, 2008, in a performance of Verdi's Aïda at the Benedum Center, in the final act of the opera, Walker stepped in to sing the role of Radames from the orchestra pit, conducting at the same time, while the tenor acted the role on stage.

In 2026, William J. Powers, having formerly served as the company's Artistic Administrator, was named Christopher Hahn's successor as General Director.

== Music Directors ==
- Theo Alcántara (1987–2002)
- John Mauceri (2000–2006)
- Antony Walker (2006–present)
