= List of films and television shows shot in Pittsburgh =

List of films and television shows shot in Pittsburgh may refer to:

- List of television shows shot in Pittsburgh
- List of films shot in Pittsburgh
