= Darrow =

Darrow is a surname of Scottish origin. Notable people with the surname include:

- Alex Darrow (born 1993), American entrepreneur, founder of PictureTheWorld
- Barbara Darrow (1931–2018) American actress
- Barry Darrow (born 1950), American football player
- Benjamin Darrow (1868–1911), American district attorney
- Charles Darrow (1889–1967), American businessman credited with inventing Monopoly game.
- Chris Darrow (1944–2020), American singer and songwriter
- Clarence Darrow (1857–1938), American lawyer and civil liberties advocate
- Clarence A. Darrow (born 1940), American lawyer and politician
- Daniel C. Darrow (1895–1965), American pediatrician and biochemist
- Elliot Darrow, American spoken word poet
- Geof Darrow (born 1955), American comic artist
- George M. Darrow (1889–1983), American horticulturist
- George P. Darrow (1859–1943), American Republican member of the House of Representatives
- George Darrow (baseball) (1903–1983), American baseball player
- Henry Darrow (1933–2021), American actor
- Jessica Darrow (born 1995), American actress and singer
- Jimmy Darrow (1937–1987), American basketball player
- John Darrow (1907–1980), American actor
- Julia Darrow Cowles – American children's book writer and storyteller
- Karl K. Darrow (1891–1982), American physicist
- Kathryn Hach-Darrow (1922–2020), American businesswoman and philanthropist
- Leah Darrow (born 1979), American model
- Nathan Darrow (born 1970s), American actor
- Paul Darrow (1941–2019), British character actor
- Ruth Darrow (1895–1956), American pathologist
- Sara Darrow (born 1970), United States District Court judge
- Tony Darrow (born 1938), American actor and screenwriter
- Whitney Darrow Jr. (1909–1999), American cartoonist
- William Darrow, American professor of public health

== Given name and spelling variants ==
- Darrow Hooper (1932–2018), American athlete
- Darrow Tully (1932–2010), American newspaper publisher
- Frankie Darro (1917–1976), American actor
- Mike Darow (1933–1996), Canadian game show host

== See also ==
- Darrow Brook, tributary on the New York-Pennsylvania border
- Darrow Wood, lightly wooded field near Denton Castle, England
- Darrow, Louisiana, an unincorporated community in Ascension Parish, Louisiana
- Darrow, Illinois, an unincorporated community in Iroquois County, Illinois
- Darrow School, an independent high school in New Lebanon, New York
- Darrow & Darrow, American/Canadian series of mystery television movies
- Melanie Darrow, American television film
- Darrow (comics), a fictional demi-god from the CrossGen Sigilverse
- Darrow, the protagonist of the science fiction series Red Rising
