= Rudy Francisco =

American poet & writer (born 1982)

- Born: July 27, 1982 (age 44); San Diego, California, U.S.
- Education: Alliant International University
- Occupation: Poet

Rudy K. Francisco (born July 27, 1982) is an American spoken word poet and writer. He has won several poetry slams and written six books of poetry: Getting Stitches, Scratch, No Gravity, No Gravity Part II, Helium, and I'll Fly Away. He made an appearance on TV One's Verses and Flow and performed his spoken word poems "Complainers" and "Rifle" on the Tonight Show Starring Jimmy Fallon.

== Early life ==
Rudy Francisco was born and raised in San Diego, California, and is of Belizean decent. He wrote a love poem as part of a writing assignment in his senior year of high school and received high marks for it.

Francisco was inspired watching HBO's Def Poetry Jam. He began to go to open mics in his area until they were closed due to gentrification. With a group of local poets and activists called "Collective Purpose", he opened an open mic known as Elevated in San Diego, which has been open for over ten years.

Francisco attended Alliant International University in San Diego. He completed a Bachelor of Arts degree in psychology and pursued a master's degree in industrial and organizational psychology. Francisco was a resident assistant at his school and started hosting open mics. He was invited to other open mics and met other poets through them. He worked as a statistical analyst and completed three years of a Ph.D. program before quitting to do poetry full-time.

== Poetry career ==
Francisco first got into performance poetry after going to open mics and watching a show that featured the poet Shihan and falling in love with the style. He says that reading The Music Lesson by Victor Wooten was pivotal moment in his life as a poet. Francisco has performed in competitions as well as shows around the world.

Francisco wrote his debut poetry book Getting Stitches in 2013, then Scratch in 2014, No Gravity in 2015, and his first full-length book Helium in 2017, which was published by Button Poetry. It took Francisco a year and a half to write the collection of 58 poems. Helium received positive reviews. When asked what Helium means in an interview, Francisco states that "helium allows you to defy gravity" and “in a lot of ways poetry always gave me that temporary escape.” Themes for Helium include race, class, gender, love, and self-reflection. His style for his poems encompasses "personal and political narratives through an honest and humorous approach."

Francisco is the founder and current coach of the San Diego Poetry Slam Team, which won the 2017 National Poetry Slam Championship.

Francisco performed his spoken-word poem "Complainers" on his first appearance on The Tonight Show Starring Jimmy Fallon on March 1, 2018. Rudy Francisco is the first to perform a full-length poem on the show. Many of his poems are on YouTube, some of which, like "Scars/To the New Boyfriend" have accumulated over two million views. He has also grown a large following on Instagram with over 250,000 followers.

== Personal life ==
Francisco has said that the slam community allows one to be a part of a family, saying “some of my closest friends are people I have been on teams with or competed against. It is what keeps me coming back around.”

Francisco has a five-year-old daughter.

== Tours and events ==
Francisco toured the UK in May and June 2018. In early June of 2018, Button Poetry announced on Facebook that performances scheduled for India with Sabrina Benaim were cancelled due to "scheduling and organizational issues." He performed at the August 2018 slam poetry competition in Chicago, representing the San Diego team. Francisco went on tour in October in the UK with fellow poets Neil Hilborn and Sabrina Benaim. On April 30, 2019, he performed at Beltway Poetry Slam in Washington, D.C. He was the host city coordinator for the May 13, 2019 Individual World Poetry Slam in Southern California.

== Books of poetry ==
- Getting Stitches (2013)
- Scratch (2014)
- No Gravity (2015)
- No Gravity Part II (2016)
- Helium (2017)
- I'll Fly Away (2020)
- Excuse Me As I Kiss The Sky (2023)

== Filmography ==
Television
Year	Title	Notes
2013	Verses and Flow	Season 3 Episode 8
2018 - 2019	The Tonight Show with Jimmy Fallon	2 episodes
2021	The Bachelorette	Season 18 Episode 3

Spoken Word Videos
Year	Title	Channel	Notes
2012	Scars/To the New Boyfriend	speakeasynyc	
2012	A Lot Like You	Marc Bacani	
2013	Sons	Button Poetry	With Terisa Siagatonu
2014	Complainers	Button Poetry	
2015	My Honest Poem	Button Poetry	

== Poetry awards ==
- 2007 San Diego Grand Slam Champion
- 2007 Poet of the People Slam Champion
- 2008 Member of the Hollywood Poetry Slam Team
- 2009 National Underground Poetry Individual Champion
- 2009 3rd place in the Individual World Poetry Slam
- 2010 La Poloma Slam Champion
- 2010 Chico Invitational Slam Champion
- 2010 San Diego Grand Slam Champion
- 2010 San Francisco Grand Slam Champion
- 2010 Member of the San Diego Poetry Slam Team (Regional Champion/6th ranked team in the nation)
- 2010 Individual World Poetry Slam Slam Champion
- 2017 National Poetry Slam Champion (as part of the San Diego Poetry Slam Team)
