= List of films shot in Pittsburgh =

This list includes notable feature films shot either completely or partially in Pittsburgh, Pennsylvania and/or the Pittsburgh metropolitan area. Some of these are set in the city; others were shot in Pittsburgh but set in another real or fictional location.

Academy Award Winner	Golden Globe Winner	Nominated, or minor award winner

== 1900s ==
1904

- Assembling a Generator
- Assembling and Testing Turbines
- Casting a Guide Box
- Coil Winding Machines
- Coil Winding Section E
- Girls Winding Armatures
- Panorama Exterior Westinghouse Works
- Panorama of Machine Co. Aisle
- Panorama View Street Car Motor Room
- Panorama View Aisle B
- Steam Hammer
- Steam Whistle
- Taking Time Checks
- Taping Coils
- Tapping a Furnace
- Testing a Rotary
- Testing Large Turbines
- Welding the Big Ring
- Westinghouse Employees Boarding Train
- Westinghouse Air Brake Co. Westinghouse Co. Works (Casting Scene)
- Westinghouse Air Brake Co. Westinghouse Co. Works (Moulding Scene)
- Westinghouse Air Brake Co. Westinghouse Works

== 1910s ==
1914

- Filial Love
- The Perils of Pauline

1915

- Via Wireless

1918

- Just a Woman

1919

- Spring Fever
  - Harold Lloyd

== 1920s ==
1922

- In the Name of the Law

1924

- Fording the Lincoln Highway

== 1930s ==
1939

- The City
- Allegheny Uprising

== 1940s ==
1941

- The Pittsburgh Kid

1942

- Pittsburgh

1945

- The Valley of Decision

1947

- The Unconquered

1948

- Melody Time

== 1950s ==
1951

- Angels in the Outfield
- I Was a Communist for the FBI

1952

- Pat and Mike
- The Winning Team

1958

- Some Came Running

== 1960s ==
1960

- The Rat Race

1963

- A Visit to Santa

1965

- Sylvia

1968

- Night of the Living Dead

== 1970s ==
1970

- Looking for Me

1971

- There's Always Vanilla
- Vagrant Woman
- Going Home
- The Act of Seeing with One's Own Eyes
- Eyes
- Deus Ex

1972

- Jack's Wife

1973

- The Crazies
- The Song Remains the Same

1977

- Slap Shot

1978

- Martin
- The Deer Hunter
  - Christopher Walken, Meryl Streep, Robert De Niro
- Dawn of the Dead

1979

- The Fish That Saved Pittsburgh

== 1980s ==
1980

- Effects

1981

- Knightriders

1982

- Creepshow #1^{Nov. 12–18}Top 10^{Nov. 12 – Dec. 16}
- Midnight

1983

- Flashdance #1 ^{Apr. 15 – May 12}Top 5 ^{May 15 – Jun. 9} Top 10 ^{-Jul. 28 & Aug. 26 – Oct. 13} Top 15 ^{until Oct. 20}
- All the Right Moves Top 5 ^{Oct. 21 – Nov. 15 & Dec. 2–Dec. 8} Top 10 ^{until Dec. 15}

1984

- Mrs. Soffel Top 10 ^{Feb. 8–10, 1985} Top 20 ^{Dec. 28, 1984 – Jan. 10, 1985}
- Reckless Top 5 ^{Feb. 3 – Feb. 16}
- The Muppets Take Manhattan Top 5 ^{Jul. 13–19} Top 10 ^{Jul 20 – Aug. 2} Top 15 ^{until Aug. 16}
- Maria's Lovers
- The Boy Who Loved Trolls

1985

- Day of the Dead
- Rappin' #5 ^{May 10 – May 16} #14 ^{May 17–23}

1986

- Gung Ho #1 ^{Mar. 14–20} Top 5 ^{Mar. 21 – Apr. 24} Top 10^{until May 29}
- The Majorettes

1987

- RoboCop Top 5 ^{Jul. 17 – Aug. 6}Top 10 ^{Aug. 7–27} Top 15^{Until Oct. 1}
- Lady Beware

1988

- The Prince of Pennsylvania
- Heartstopper
- Monkey Shines
- Kenny
- Dominick and Eugene Top 20: ^{Mar. 18–24}
- Tiger Warsaw
- Flesheater

1989

- No Place Like Home
- An Unremarkable Life

== 1990s ==
1990

- Pretty Woman #1^{Mar. 23–29; Apr. 27 – May 17} #2 ^{Mar. 30 – Apr. 26} #3 ^{May 18 – May 31} Top 5^{-Jun. 14} Top 10^{-Jul. 12} Top 15 ^{-Oct. 18}
- Night of the Living Dead #7 ^{Oct. 19–25} #14 ^{Oct. 26 – Nov. 1}
- Two Evil Eyes #17 ^{Oct. 25–31}
- Iron Maze
- Simple Justice

1991

- The Silence of the Lambs #1 ^{Feb. 15 – Mar. 21} #2 ^{Mar. 22 – Apr. 11} Top 6 ^{Apr. 12 – May 16} Top 15 ^{until Jun. 20}
- My Girl #2 ^{Nov. 29 – Dec. 5} #3 ^{Dec. 6–12} #4 ^{Nov. 22–28} Top 10 ^{until Jan. 2, 1992}
- Diary of a Hitman
- Waterland
- North of Pittsburgh

1992

- Passed Away #14 ^{Apr. 24–30}
- Whispers in the Dark #8 ^{Aug. 7–13} #11 ^{Aug. 14–20}
- Bob Roberts Top 15 ^{Sep. 11–17 & Sep. 25 – Oct. 1} Top 20 ^{Sep. 4–Oct. 1}
- Innocent Blood #8 ^{Sep. 25 – Oct. 1} #12 ^{Oct. 2–8}
- Hoffa #6 ^{Dec. 25, 1992 – Jan. 7, 1993} #8 ^{Jan. 8–14} #12 ^{until Jan. 21}
- The Cemetery Club
- The Fire Next Time
- The Jacksons: An American Dream
- Triumph of the Heart

1993

- Lorenzo's Oil Top 20 ^{Jan. 1–Feb. 4}
- Groundhog Day #1 ^{Feb. 12–25} #2 ^{Feb. 26 – Mar. 11} Top 18 ^{until Jun. 17}
- The Dark Half #6 ^{Apr. 23–29} #8 ^{Apr. 30 – May 6} #11 ^{until May 13}
- Money for Nothing #16 ^{Sep. 10–16}
- Striking Distance #1 ^{Sep. 17–23} #4^{Sep. 24–30} Top 10 ^{until Oct. 7} Top 15 ^{until Oct. 14}
  - Bruce Willis, Dennis Farina, John Mahoney, Sarah Jessica Parker
- Roommates
- Heartstopper

1994

- Boys on the Side #2 ^{Feb. 3–9} #4 ^{Feb. 10–16} Top 10^{until Mar. 2}
- Milk Money Top 5 ^{Sep. 2–8 & 16-22} Top 10 ^{until Sep.}
- Timecop #1 ^{Sep. 16–29} #3 ^{Sep. 30 – Oct. 6} #6 ^{until Oct. 13} Top 15 ^{until Oct. 27}
- Only You #3 ^{Oct. 7–13} Top 10 ^{Oct. 14–27} Top 15 ^{until Nov.}
- Street Corner Justice

1995

- Houseguest #3 ^{Jan. 6–12} #6 ^{Jan. 13–19} Top 11 ^{until Feb. 9}
- Sudden Death Top 11 ^{Dec. 22, 1995 – Jan. 7, 1996}

1996

- Bed of Roses #2 ^{Jan. 26 – Feb. 1} #5 ^{Feb. 2–8} #7 ^{Feb. 9–15}
- Diabolique #3 ^{Mar. 22–28} #5 ^{Mar. 29 – Apr. 4} #11 ^{until Apr. 7}
- Independence Day
- Kingpin #4 ^{Jul. 26 – Aug. 1} #6 ^{Aug. 2–8}Top 20 ^{until Aug. 18}
- That Thing You Do! Top 5 ^{Oct. 4–24} Top 10 ^{Oct. 25 – Oct. 31}
- Santa Claws

1997

- Fire Down Below #1 ^{Sep. 5–11} #3 ^{Sep. 5–18} #10 ^{Sep. 19–21}

1998

- Desperate Measures Top 10 ^{Jan. 30 – Feb. 12} #11 ^{until Feb. 16}
- Transatlantic
- Whatever

1999

- Inspector Gadget #2 ^{Jul. 23–29} #5 ^{Jul. 30 – Aug. 5} #7 ^{Aug. 6–26}
- Stigmata #1 ^{Sep. 10–16} #4 ^{Sep. 17–24} Top 10 ^{Sep. 25 – Oct. 7} Top 15 ^{Oct. 8–21}
- Dogma #3 ^{Nov. 12–18} #7 ^{Nov. 19 – Dec. 2} #6 ^{Dec. 3–9} #8 ^{Dec. 10–16} #13 ^{Dec. 17–23}

== 2000s ==
2000

- Eye of the Beholder #1 ^{Jan. 28 – Feb. 3} #5 ^{Feb. 4–10} #9 ^{Feb. 11–17}
- Wonder Boys #7 ^{Feb. 25 – Mar. 2} #10 ^{Mar. 3–9} #13 ^{Mar. 10–16} Top 20 ^{Mar. 17–30}
- Screwed #8 ^{May 12–18} #12 ^{May 19–25} #20 ^{May 26 – Jun. 1}
- Civility
- View from the Vault
- Brother 2

2001

- Rock Star #4 ^{Sep. 7–13} #9 ^{Sep. 14–20} #8 ^{Sep. 21–27} #17 ^{Sep. 28 – Oct. 4}
- A Wedding for Bella

2002

- The Mothman Prophecies #6 ^{Jan. 25 – Feb. 7} #10 ^{Feb. 8–14} #18 ^{Feb. 15–21}
- The Murder

2003

- Bringing Down the House #1 ^{Mar. 7–27} Top 5 ^{Mar. 28 – Apr. 17} Top 15 ^{Apr. 18 – May 8} Top 20 ^{May 9–Jun. 12}
- Beautiful Girl
- August Underground's Mordum

2004

- The Clearing Top 20 ^{Jul. 2–29}
- 10th & Wolf
- Fragile
- The War that Made America

2005

- Land of the Dead #6 ^{Jun. 24–30} #10 ^{Jul. 1–7} #15 ^{Jul. 8–14} 23 ^{Jul. 15–21}
- Devil and Daniel Johnston
- The Bituminous Coal Queens of Pennsylvania
- Me and the Mosque
- Dumpster

2006

- Pittsburgh
- Chasing 3000
- God Grew Tired of Us
- a/k/a Tommy Chong
- American Scary
- Bewilderness
- Abattoir
- Prison Girl

2007

- The Mysteries of Pittsburgh
- The Haunting Hour Volume One: Don't Think About It
- Gravida
- The Lottery
- All Saints Eve

2008

- Smart People #7 ^{Apr. 11–17} #11 ^{Apr. 18–24} #15 ^{Apr 25 – May 1} #18 ^{May 2–8}
- Zack and Miri Make a Porno #2 ^{Oct. 31 – Nov. 6} #5 ^{Nov. 7–13} #6 ^{Nov. 14–20} #12 ^{Nov. 21–27} #14 ^{Nov. 28 – Dec. 4} #18^{Dec. 5–11}
- Graduation
- My Bloody Valentine 3D
- Deadtime Stories
- Dear Zachary: A Letter to a Son About His Father
- The Bridge to Nowhere
- Homecoming

2009

- Adventureland #6 ^{Apr. 3–9} #9 ^{Apr. 10–16} #13 ^{Apr. 17–23} #16 ^{Apr. 24–30} #25 ^{May 1–7}
- The Road #10 ^{Nov. 27 – Dec. 3} #16 ^{Dec. 4–10} #17 ^{Dec. 11–24} #19 ^{Dec. 25–31} #18 ^{Jan. 1–7 2010}
- Hollywood & Wine
- Shannon's Rainbow
- Sorority Row
- Kenny Chesney: Summer in 3-D
- End Game
- If It Ain't Broke, Break It

== 2010s ==
=== 2010 ===
- She's Out of My League #3 ^{Mar. 12–18} #6 ^{Mar. 19–25} #7 ^{Mar. 26 – Apr. 1} #9 ^{Apr. 2–8} #14 ^{Apr. 9–15} #25 ^{Apr. 16–22}
  - Jay Baruchel, Alice Eve
- Unstoppable #2 ^{Nov.12-18} #3 ^{Nov. 19–25} #5 ^{Nov. 26 – Dec. 2} #4 ^{Dec. 3–9} #6 ^{Dec. 10–16} #12 ^{Dec. 17–23} #17 ^{Dec. 24–30} #15 ^{Dec. 31 – Jan. 6} #18 ^{Jan. 7–13}
  - Denzel Washington, Chris Pine, Rosario Dawson
- The Next Three Days #6 ^{Nov. 19–25} #9 ^{Nov. 26 – Dec. 2} #10 ^{Dec. 3–9} #13 ^{Dec. 10–16} #25 ^{Dec. 17–23}
  - Russell Crowe, Liam Neeson, Brian Dennehy, Elizabeth Banks
- Love & Other Drugs #10 ^{November. 19–25} #6 ^{Nov. 26 – Dec. 2} #5 ^{Dec. 3–9} #8 ^{Dec. 10–16} #16 ^{Dec. 17–23} #22 ^{Dec. 31 – Jan. 6} #19 ^{Jan. 7–13}
  - Jake Gyllenhaal, Anne Hathaway
- Dog Jack
  - Louis Gossett Jr.
- The Chief
- Chasing 3000

=== 2011 ===
- I Am Number Four #3 ^{Feb. 18–24} #4 ^{Feb. 25 – Mar. 3} #9 ^{Mar. 4–10} #12 ^{Mar. 11–17} #15 ^{Mar. 18–24} #19 ^{Mar. 25–31}
- Super 8 #1 ^{Jun. 10–16} #2 ^{Jun. 17–23} #5 ^{Jun. 24 – Jul. 7} #7 ^{Jul. 8–14} #9 ^{Jul. 15–21} #14 ^{Jul. 22–28}
- Warrior #3 ^{Sep. 9–15} #8 ^{Sep. 16–22} #12 ^{Sep. 23–29} #17 ^{Sep. 30 – Oct. 6} #24 ^{Oct. 7–13}
- Abduction #4 ^{Sep. 23–29} #8 ^{Sep. 30 – Oct. 6} #11 ^{Oct. 7–13} #13 ^{Oct. 14–20} #20 ^{Oct. 21–27}
- Margaret
- River of Darkness
- On the Inside
- Riddle

=== 2012 ===
- One for the Money #3^{Jan. 27 – Feb. 2} #6^{Feb. 3–9} #13^{Feb. 10–16} #18^{Feb. 17–23}
- The Avengers #1^{May 4–24} #2^{May 25–31} #3^{Jun. 1–7} #5^{Jun. 8–14} #7^{Jun. 15–21} #8^{Jun. 22–28} #11^{Jun. 29 – Jul. 5} #12^{Jul. 6–19}
- The Dark Knight Rises #1^{Jul. 20 – Aug. 9} #3^{Aug. 10–16} #5^{Aug. 17–23} #6^{Aug. 24–30} 8^{Aug. 31 – Sep. 6} 10^{Sep. 7–13} 12^{Sep. 14–20} 14^{Sep. 21–27}
- The Perks of Being a Wallflower #13^{Sep. 28 – Oct. 4} #11^{Oct. 5–11} #10^{Oct. 12–18} #12^{Oct. 19–25} #16^{Oct. 26 – Nov. 1} #17^{Nov. 2–8} #14^{Nov. 9–15}
- Won't Back Down #10^{Sep. 28 – Oct. 4} #13^{Oct. 5–11} #23^{Oct. 12–18}
- Jack Reacher #4^{Dec. 21–27} #5^{Dec. 28 – Jan. 10} #11^{Jan. 11–17} #16^{Jan. 18–24}
- Homemakers

=== 2013 ===
- Baseball's Last Hero: 21 Clemente Stories
- Promised Land #29^{Dec. 28, 2012 – Jan. 3} #10^{Jan. 4–10} #19^{Jan. 11–17}
- Out of the Furnace #3^{Dec. 6–12} #7^{Dec. 13–19} #29^{Dec. 20–26}
- Grudge Match #12^{Dec. 20–26} #11^{Dec. 27 – Jan. 2 2014} #11^{Jan. 3–9} #15^{Jan. 10–16}
- The Lifeguard
- 6 Souls
- Generation Iron
- Elixir

=== 2014 ===
- The Fault in Our Stars #1^{Jun 6–12} #4^{Jun 13–19} #7^{Jun 20–26} #8^{Jun 27 – Jul 3} #11^{Jul 4–10} #15^{Jul 11–17} #19^{Jul 18–24}
- Foxcatcher

=== 2015 ===
- Me & Earl & the Dying Girl
- American Pastoral
- Fathers and Daughters
- The Last Witch Hunter
- Concussion
- Southpaw
- Let It Snow

=== 2016 ===
- Last Flag Flying
- Fences

=== 2019 ===
- The Amusement Park
- Sweet Girl
- I'm Your Woman
- Ma Rainey's Black Bottom
- Happiest Season

=== 2020 ===
- An American Pickle

=== 2022 ===
- A Man Called Otto

== See also ==
- List of television shows shot in Pittsburgh
- Pittsburgh Film Office
- Three Rivers Film Festival
