= Schweinitz (disambiguation) =

Schweinitz is a village in Saxony-Anhalt, Germany.

Schweinitz may also refer to:

- Trhové Sviny in the Czech Republic, known in German as Schweinitz
- Schweinitz (stream), a stream in Germany and the Czech Republic

== People with the surname ==
- Dorothea de Schweinitz (1891–1980), American social worker
- Edmund Alexander de Schweinitz (1825–1887), American bishop of the Moravian Church
- Emil Alexander de Schweinitz (1866–1904), American bacteriologist
- Lewis David de Schweinitz (1780–1834), American botanist
- Louise de Schweinitz Darrow (1897–1997), American physician
- Wolfgang von Schweinitz (born 1953), German composer
