= List of television shows shot in Pittsburgh =

This list includes nationally or globally broadcast television shows shot either completely or partially in the Pittsburgh metropolitan area. Some of these are actually set in the city; others were shot in Pittsburgh but are set in another real or fictional location.

Title	Year(s)	Actor(s)	Actress(es)	Note(s)
One Dollar	2018			
Downward Dog	2017		Allison Tolman	
Man with a Plan	2016–2020	Matt LeBlanc		
Banshee	2015			
The Outsiders	2015			
Today	2015			
Undercover Boss	2015	Bill Peduto		
Meet the Press	2014	Bill Peduto		
It Takes a Choir	2014			
CNN	2014			
Good Morning America; 2 episodes	2014			
Four Weddings	2014			
ESPN: 30 for 30 Shorts "The Hitting Glove"	2014			
CNN @ThisHour	2014			
Sunday Night Baseball	2014	Jon Hamm		
America's Newsroom	2014			
For the Love of the Game	2014			
The Chair	2014			
MLB The Show: 2014 (commercial)	2014	Andrew McCutchen		
The O'Reilly Factor	2014	Ty Miller		
Farm Queens	2014			
White Collar Brawlers	2013–present			
Bloomberg "Market Makers"	2013	Luke Ravenstahl		
Food Paradise	2013			
Hatfield & McCoys	2013			
American Experience; Roberto Clemente	2013			
ABC World News; 2 newscasts	2013			
MLB the Show commercial	2013	Andrew McCutchen		
Kitchen Nightmares	2013	Gordon Ramsay		
Today; 2 episodes	2013			
MLB Play commercial	2013	Andrew McCutchen		
A Conversation with Justice Thomas	2013	Justice Thomas		
The Clemente Effect	2013			
Those Who Kill	2013	James D'Arcy	Chloë Sevigny	
Bloomberg Game Changers; Mark Cuban	2012	Mark Cuban		
Farm Kings	2012–present			
Daniel Tiger's Neighborhood	2012–present			
Broadway or Bust	2012			
The Colbert Report; 2 episodes	2012			
Outside the Lines	2012	Neil Walker		
Restaurant: Impossible; Dell's	2012	Robert Irvine		
Today	2012		Jenna Bush Hager	
Sullivan & Son	2012–2014	Dan Lauria	Valerie Azlynn	
Doomsday Preppers	2012	Joshua Wander		
The O'Reilly Factor; 2 episodes	2012			
Ink Master	2012			
Kitchen Nightmares	2012	Gordon Ramsay		
2012 NHL Entry Draft	2012			
Fox News Sunday	2012	Bill Hemmer		
How Booze Built America "Westward Ho!"	2012			
A Football Life; 2 episodes	2012	Franco Harris		
Progressive Insurance commercial	2012			
NBC Super Bowl Commercial	2012			
Best Sandwich in America	2012	Adam Richman		
Anea	2012			
American Idol	2012	Steven Tyler	Jennifer Lopez	
Antiques Roadshow	2012	Mark Walberg		
American History Television "American Artifacts"	2012		Kathy Kean	
Elixir	2012			
Mysteries at the Museum; Jonas Salk	2012	Don Wildman		
Fox News Reporting "Behind Obama's Green Agenda"	2012	Mark Levin		
The Rachel Maddow Show	2011	Ricky Burgess	Rachel Maddow, Meghan McCain	
NBC News	2012			
Inventionland	2011			
A Football Life; Al Davis	2011			
C-SPAN: Lectures in History	2011			
Modern Marvels; Pocket Tech	2011			
Party on Fifth Ave. music video	2011	Mac Miller		
How the States Got Their Shapes "A River Runs Through It"	2011			
Supermarkets Inc. "Inside a $500 Billion Money Machine"	2011	Tyler Mathisen		
Dance Moms	2011–present			
Scammed	2011			
Frick Park Market music video	2011	Mac Miller		
Only in America	2011	Larry the Cable Guy		
A Football Life	2011	Mike Ditka		
Off Limits	2011	Don Wildman		
Outrageous Food; 2 episodes	2010–11			
My First Place	2011			
NatGeo Presents "Pioneers turned Millionaires: Heinz"	2011			
Mylan Golf Classic	2011	Gary Christian		
American Greed "Computer Hacking Masterminds"	2011			
Locke & Key	2011			
Suits	2011			
NHL Winter Classic	2011			
AFC Playoffs; 2 games	2011			
Black and Yellow music video	2010	Wiz Khalifa		
NHL Legends Game	2010			
Bridgeville by Chevy	2010			
Mylan Golf Classic	2010	Kevin Kisner		
"Pioneer" by Levi's	2010			
HBO 24/7	2010	Liev Schreiber		
BBC-TV	2010			
Biography on CNBC "Heinz: the Ketchup Kings"	2010			
Ghost Lab "The Betrayal"	2010			
History Detectives	2010			
Romantically Challenged	2010		Alyssa Milano	
Breakout "The Pittsburgh Six"	2010			
U.S. Women's Open Championships	2010			
C-SPAN; Pennsylvania Senate Debate	2010	Pat Toomey		
As the World Turns	2009		Tamara Tunie	
Justified	2009	Timothy Olyphant	Joelle Carter	
AFC Playoffs; 2 games	2009			
Forrest Wood Cup	2009	Greg Hackney		
Three Rivers	2009–10			
Today; 2 episodes	2009		Amy Robach	
The Daily Show; 4 episodes	2009	John Oliver, Nicolas Sarkozy		
Naked Science	2009			
America's Game: The Super Bowl Champions; The 2008 Steelers	2009			
Bragging Rights	2009	John Cena	Melina Perez	
Stanley Cup Final; 3 games	2009			
A Ride Along the Lincoln Highway	2008	Rick Sebak		
Modern Marvels "Crashes"	2008			
Penn & Teller: Bullshit! "Going Green"	2008	Al Gore		
Diners, Drive-Ins and Dives; 5 episodes	2008–09			
Waffle Shop: A Reality Show	2008–12			
Good Morning America	2008		Robin Roberts, Diane Sawyer	
AFC Playoffs; 1 game	2008			
Modern Marvels	2008			
Future of Broadband and Digital Media	2008			
Hannity & Colmes	2008	Sean Hannity	Sarah Palin	
Man v. Food	2008	Adam Richman		
Stanley Cup Final; 3 games	2008			
Modern Marvels "Carbon"	2008			
NEC Basketball Championship	2008			
MythBusters	2008			
The Daily Show	2008	Barack Obama		
Modern Marvels; Night	2008			
Back to You	2007–08	Kelsey Grammer	Patricia Heaton	
Bam's Unholy Union	2007	Bam Margera	April Margera	
60 Minutes	2007			
Armageddon	2007			
PBS Exposé: America's Investigative Reports; 2 episodes	2007			
Heartland	2007	Treat Williams, Dabney Coleman	Morena Baccarin	
KOMO NEWS	2007			
America's Game: The Super Bowl Champions; The 1975 Steelers	2007			
America's Game: The Super Bowl Champions; The 1975 Steelers	2007			
America's Game: The Super Bowl Champions; The 1974 Steelers	2007			
America's Game: The Super Bowl Champions; The 1978 Steelers	2007			
America's Game: The Super Bowl Champions; The 2005 Steelers	2007			
America's Game: The Super Bowl Champions; The 1972 Dolphins	2007			
U.S. Open Championships	2007	Ángel Cabrera, Tiger Woods, Jim Furyk		
Modern Marvels; NASA	2007			
C-SPAN: Judge Mansmann Award	2007	Justice Alito, Judge Scirica	Marjorie Rendell	
The Kill Point	2007	Donnie Wahlberg; John Leguizamo; Tobin Bell	Jennifer Ferrin	
The Today Show	2006	Matt Lauer	Katie Couric	
The Lost Room	2006	Kevin Pollock	Julianna Margulies	
The Daily Show; 2 episodes	2006			
Smith	2006	Ray Liotta	Amy Smart	
84 Lumber Golf Classic	2006	Ben Curtis	Michelle Wie	
Scariest Places on Earth; Dixmont Hospital	2006		Linda Blair	
Prison Girl	2006			
MLB All-Star Game	2006			
Mr. Right Now music video	2006	Ben Roethlisberger		
Vice President Speech to LaRoche College	2005	Dick Cheney		
Conspiracy? "Kecksburg UFO"	2005			
Blind Date	2005			
AFC Playoffs; 2 games	2005			
84 Lumber Golf Classic	2005	Jason Gore		
President & First Lady Address to CCAC	2005	George W. Bush	Laura Bush	
Bound for Glory	2005	Dick Butkus		
Meet You in Hell: Andrew Carnegie, Henry Clay Frick	2005	Les Standiford		
Christopher Hitchens Special	2005	Christopher Hitchens		
The It's Alive Show	2005			
SportsCentury: Curt Schilling	2005			
No Way Out	2005	John Cena		
Bassmaster Classic	2005	Kevin VanDam		
Senior PGA Championship	2005			
UFO Files "UFOs and the White House"	2005			
The Daily Show	2005	Gerald Schatten		
The War That Made America	2004	Graham Greene		
84 Lumber Golf Classic	2004	Vijay Singh		
Vice President Address	2004	Dick Cheney		
Jeopardy!	2004	Alex Trebek		
Skate America	2004	Brian Joubert	Angela Nikodinov	
The Daily Show	2004	Ed Helms; John Kerry		
Cathedrals of the Game	2004			
84 Lumber Golf Classic	2003	J. L. Lewis		
AFC Playoffs; 1 game	2003			
Made in America	2003	John Ratzenberger		
SportsCentury: Terry Bradshaw	2003			
SportsCentury: Dan Marino	2003			
The Daily Show	2003	George W. Bush		
U.S. Amateur Championship	2003			
Good Morning America; June–November	2002	Charles Gibson	Diane Sawyer	
The Daily Show	2002	Rob Corddry		
84 Lumber Golf Classic	2002	Dan Forsman		
Sports Century: Clemente	2002			
Hannity & Colmes	2002	Shawn Blake	Eve Hibbits	
The Guardian	2002	Simon Baker; Dabney Coleman	Erica Leerhsen	
Sports Century: Mario Lemieux	2002			
The West Wing	2002	Rob Lowe; Martin Sheen	Emily Procter	
The Pennsylvania Miner's Story	2002			
NCAA men's basketball tournament	2002			
AFC Playoffs; 2 games	2002			
SportsCentury: 1992	2002			
President Bush Address	2001	George W. Bush		
Marconi Golf Classic	2001	Robert Allenby		
NCAA women's basketball tournament	2001			
SportsCentury: Joe Namath	2001			
Unforgiven	2001	Dwayne Johnson		
SportsCentury: Pete Maravich	2001			
SportsCentury: Barry Bonds	2001			
SportsCentury: Stan Musial	2001			
SportsCentury: Hank Greenberg	2001			
Gore 2000 Rally	2000	Al Gore		
Heavyweight Fight	2000	Cliff Eteinne; Lamon Brewster		
84 Lumber Golf Classic	2000	Chris DiMarco		
Modern Marvels "Power Plants"	2000			
SportsCentury: Johnny Unitas	2000			
SportsCentury: Bill Mazeroski	2000			
President's Ford Pardon of Richard Nixon	1999	Jerald F. TerHorst		
About Your House	1999			
CBS Evening News; 4 October Newscasts	1999	Dan Rather		
The Daily Show; 2 episodes	1999	Mo Rocca	Beth Littleford	
AFC Playoffs; 2 games	1998			
Modern Marvels; American Steel	1998			
King of the Ring	1998	Steve Austin	Rena Mero	
The Temptations	1998			
Wheel Of Fortune	1998	Pat Sajak	Vanna White	
Fortune 500 Forum William Cohen	1998	Sec. Cohen		
NBC News Reports: Blacks and Blue	1998	Geraldo Rivera		
C-SPAN de Tocqueville; Democracy in America	1997			
Modern Marvels; 2 episodes	1997			
NCAA men's basketball tournament	1997			
AFC Playoffs; 1 game	1997			
The Christmas Tree	1996			
AFC Playoffs; 2 games	1996			
The Assassination File	1996			
Remember WENN	1996–98	Christopher Murney	Dina Spybey	
Hope and Gloria	1995–96	Alan Thicke	Jessica Lundy	
SummerSlam	1995	Vince McMahon		
Sliders	1995	Jerry O'Connell	Sabrina Lloyd	
AFC Playoffs; 2 games	1995			
My So-Called Life	1994–95	Jared Leto	Claire Danes	
MLB All-Star Game	1994			
Majors-Clinton U.K.-U.S. Summitt	1994	Bill Clinton; John Majors		
The Piano Lesson	1994	Charles S. Dutton	Courtney B. Vance	
The Stand	1994	Gary Sinise; Rob Lowe	Molly Ringwald	
Good Morning America	1994			
Amazing America	1994			
Backstreet Justice	1994			
Breathing Lessons	1994	James Garner	Joanne Woodward	
A Promise Kept	1994			
Skate America	1994			
U.S. Open Championship	1994	Ernie Els		
The American Revolution	1994			
The X-Files; 4 episodes	1993	David Duchovny	Gillian Anderson	
Sirens	1993–95		Jayne Brook; Adrienne-Joi Johnson	
Quantum Leap; Series Finale	1993	Scott Bakula		
Presidential Address	1993	Bill Clinton		
Pittsburgh Crusade	1993	Billy Graham		
AFC Playoffs; 1 game	1993			
National League Championship; 3 games	1992			
Larry King Live	1992	Bruno Sammartino; Vince McMahon		
Thatcher Address	1992		Margaret Thatcher	
The Nation Speaks first televised national "town hall"	1992	Bill Clinton		
Blind Spot	1992		Joanne Woodward	
Innocent Blood	1992	Anthony LaPaglia; Robert Loggia	Anne Parillaud	
Citizen Cohn	1992	James Woods	Novella Nelson	
Against Her Will: An Incident in Baltimore	1992	Walter Matthau		
U.S. Women's Open Championship	1992			
What She Doesn't Know	1992			
Stanley Cup Final; 3 games	1992			
NBC Nightly News	1992		Andrea Mitchell	
National League Championship; 4 games	1991			
Guilty Until Proven Innocent	1991	Martin Sheen; Brendan Fraser		
Dead and Alive: The Race for Gus Farace	1991	Samuel L. Jackson; Tony Danza		
Darrow	1991	Kevin Spacey		
COPS; 11 episodes	1991–93			
Where in the World is Carmen Sandiego?	1991–96		Lynne Thigpen	
Stanley Cup Final; 2 games	1991			
You Take the Kids	1990–91	Mos Def	Nell Carter	
Equal Justice	1990–91		Sarah Jessica Parker	
NHL All Star Game	1990			
National League Championship; 3 games	1990			
U.S. Senior Open	1989			
Cappelli & Company	1989–92			
Stuck With Each Other	1989			
Remaking Cities Conference	1988	Charles, Prince of Wales		
The American Experience	1988			
Alone in the Neon Jungle	1988			
Unsolved Mysteries	1987	Robert Stack		
ArenaBowl I	1987			
The Today Show; Several May newscasts	1987	Bryant Gumbel	Jane Pauley	
He's the Mayor	1986			
The Bangles Live from Syria Mosque (MTV)	1986		Sussanna Hoffs	
	1985			
Silent Witness	1985	John Savage	Valerie Bertinelli	
Mr. Belvedere	1985–90	Bob Uecker	Tracy Wells	
Goodwill Tour	1984	François Mitterrand		
The Leatherstocking Tales	1984			
Democratic Party National Primary Debate; 2-day debate	1984	Walter Mondale; Jesse Jackson		
UnitedWay NFL commercial	1984	Art Rooney		
U.S. Figure Skating Championships	1983	Scott Hamilton	Rosalynn Sumners	
AFC Playoffs; 1 game	1983			
EPCOT Magazine	1983			
Heart of Steel	1983		Melissa Gilbert	
Reagan Jobs Address	1983	Ronald Reagan		
Eastern 8 Basketball tournament	1982			
U.S. Open Championship	1983	Larry Nelson		
Fantasy	1982			
Fighting Back	1982	Art Carney; Robert Urich	Bonnie Bedelia	
Eastern 8 Basketball tournament	1981			
World Heavyweight Title Fight; Holmes v. Snipes	1981	Larry Holmes		
The Silencers (American band) "Rock'n'Roll Enforcers"	1981			
	1980			
Eastern 8 Basketball tournament	1980			
AFC Playoffs; 2 games	1980	Bryant Gumbel		
Death Penalty	1980			
Skag	1980–81	Karl Malden	Piper Laurie	
Senator Kennedy from Cyclops Steel	1980	Ted Kennedy		
GOP Annual Spring Dinner	1980	Ronald Reagan; George H. W. Bush		
Eastern 8 Basketball tournament	1979			
World Series; 3 games	1979			
National League Championship; 1 game	1979			
Real People	1979	Vic Cianca		
Allison and the Magic Bubble	1979			
AFC Playoffs; 2 games	1979			
Short Letter to the Long Goodbye	1978			
PGA Championship	1978			
Eastern 8 Basketball tournament	1978			
Previn and the Pittsburgh Symphony	1977	André Previn		
ELVIS! New Year's Eve Concert	1976	Elvis Presley		
AFC Playoffs; 2 games	1976			
Evening Magazine	1976–90	Dennis Miller	Donna Hanover	
Ryder Cup Championship	1975			
National League Championship; 1 game	1975			
Bancroft Cup Finals	1975			
AFC Playoffs; 1 game	1975			
MLB All-Star Game	1974			
National League Championship; 2 games	1974			
U.S. Open Championship	1973	Johnny Miller; Arnold Palmer		
AFC Playoffs; 2 games	1973			
National League Championship; 2 Games	1972			
World Series; 3 games	1971			
National League Championship; 2 games	1971			
Monday Night Football; 22 games	1970– 2008	Howard Cosell		
National League Championship; 2 games	1970			
U.S. Amateur Championship	1969			
Planes, People and Paraphernalia	1969			
Billy Graham Pitt Stadium Crusade	1968	Richard Nixon; Billy Graham	Pat Nixon	
ABA Finals; 4 games	1968			
The Bell Telephone Hour; 1 episode	1968	Louis Armstrong; Dizzy Gillespie		
1967 Calder Cup Finals	1967			
PGA Championship	1965			
National Geographic Explorer	1964–86			
Lyndon B. Johnson Civic Arena Address	1964			
Candid Camera	1964	Vic Cianca		
Heavyweight Fight	1963	Muhammad Ali		
Perry Como NBC Special	1963	Perry Como		
U.S. Open Championship	1962	Arnold Palmer; Jack Nicklaus		
Mister Rogers' Neighborhood	1962– 2001	Fred Rogers		
Route 66; 2 episodes	1961	Lee Marvin	Ethel Waters	
World Series; 4 games	1960			
Adventure Time	1959			
Studio Wrestling	1959–72			
Ricki & Copper	1959–69			
MLB All Star Game	1959			
Western Golf Open	1958			
Heavyweight Fight	1956	Bob Baker; Tommy Jackson		
AHL All-Star Game	1956			
Pittsburgh Open	1956			
Presidential Address from Hunt Armory	1956	Dwight D. Eisenhower		
Calder Cup Finals	1955			
The Children's Corner	1953–61			
U.S. Open Championship	1953	Ben Hogan		
Happy's Party	1952–53			
Billy Graham's Forbes Field Crusade	1952	Billy Graham		
PGA Championship	1951			
Roads to Romance	1951			
Heavyweight Fight	1951	Rex Layne; Ezzard Charles		
World Heavyweight Championship	1951	Joe Walcott; Ezzard Charles		
Coaxial Cable; Opening Special; All 4 networks 3-hour Syria Mosque special Connecting the Mid-West and East Networks	1949			
