= The Kiski School =

Prep school in Saltsburg, Pennsylvania, US

Location
- 1888 Brett Lane; Saltsburg, Pennsylvania 15681-8951; United States; 40.4868°N 79.4571°W

Information
- Former name: Kiskiminetas Springs School
- Type: Independent college-preparatory boarding & day high school
- Motto: Latin: Dirige Nos Domine (Guide Us Lord)
- Religious affiliation: Nonsectarian
- Established: 1888; 138 years ago
- Founder: Andrew W. Wilson
- Status: Currently operational
- CEEB code: 394365
- NCES School ID: 01197887
- Chair: John Jacob
- Head of school: Mark Ott
- Faculty: 24.4 (on an FTE basis)
- Grades: 9–12, PG
- Gender: Co-ed
- Age range: 14–18
- Enrollment: 189 (2023–2024)
  - Grade 9: 29
  - Grade 10: 34
  - Grade 11: 53
  - Grade 12: 73
- Average class size: 10
- Student to teacher ratio: 7.7:1
- Language: English
- Hours in school day: 6
- Campus size: 350 acres (140 ha)
- Area: 300,000 square feet (28,000 m^{2})
- Campus type: Distant rural
- Colors: Black and White
- Slogan: Preparing young men to succeed in college and life
- Song: Kiski Then Forever
- Fight song: Fight for Old Kiski
- Athletics: 12 varsity teams
- Athletics conference: PAISAA
- Nickname: Cougars
- Accreditation: MSA
- Publication: The Kiski School Bulletin; The Springs
- Newspaper: Kiski News; Kiski Minutes; The Kiskiminetan
- Yearbook: Kiskiminetan
- Endowment: $12.87 million
- Annual tuition: $71,000 (boarding) $35,000 (day)
- Revenue: $12.62 million
- Graduates (2020): 75
- Affiliations: NAIS, PAIS, & TABS
- Website: kiski.org

The Kiski School (formerly the Kiskiminetas Springs School and often known simply as Kiski or Kiski Prep) is an independent, college-preparatory boarding school in Saltsburg, Pennsylvania, United States. The school, named after the nearby Kiskiminetas River, is located about 30 miles (48 km) east by north of Pittsburgh, Pennsylvania.

Founded in 1888, Kiski educates students in grades 9–12, along with a post-graduate (PG) year. Kiski has an enrollment of approximately 200 boarding and day students, with international students from more than 31 different countries.

== History ==
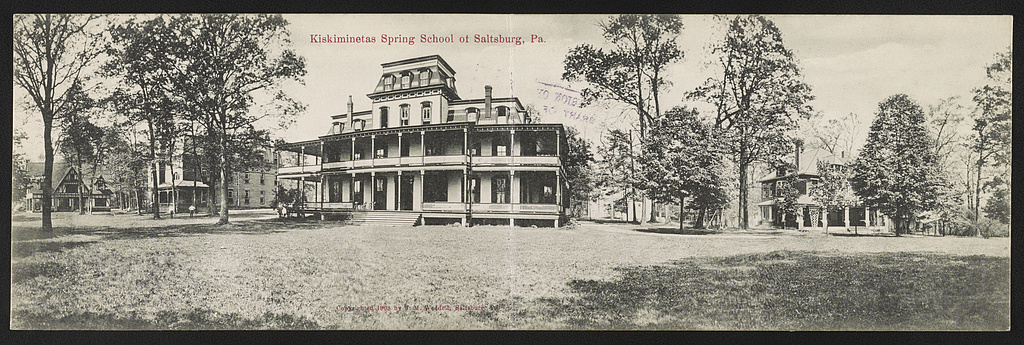
The school buildings and grounds circa 1908

=== 19th century ===
In 1888, Andrew W. Wilson founded the school on a wooded hill overlooking the Kiskiminetas River separating Westmoreland County from Indiana County. The site had once been a summer resort and mineral spa. In the school's first catalog, printed in 1888, Wilson stated that the goal was to establish "a boys' school of high order that would prepare graduates to enter any American college or scientific school." There were two other elements of the founding mission. First, "to train and develop the moral faculties which at this period of life are so susceptible to culture." Second, "to afford all the comforts and as many as possible of the pleasures and advantages of home, during this period of training."

Forty-two students had graduated by 1894; 26 attended Princeton University. The original faculty consisted of just Wilson (who had graduated from Princeton and the University of Pennsylvania Law School) and the school's co-founder, R. William Fair, who taught mathematics. Wilson led the school through its first four decades with the assistance of his wife, daughters, sons-in-law, and close friends.

=== 20th century ===
Alexander James Inglis's first professional job was as a Latin teacher at the school during the 1902–1903 school year. On May 6, 1905, the Psi chapter of the Gamma Delta Psi fraternity, a high school fraternity, was founded at the school.

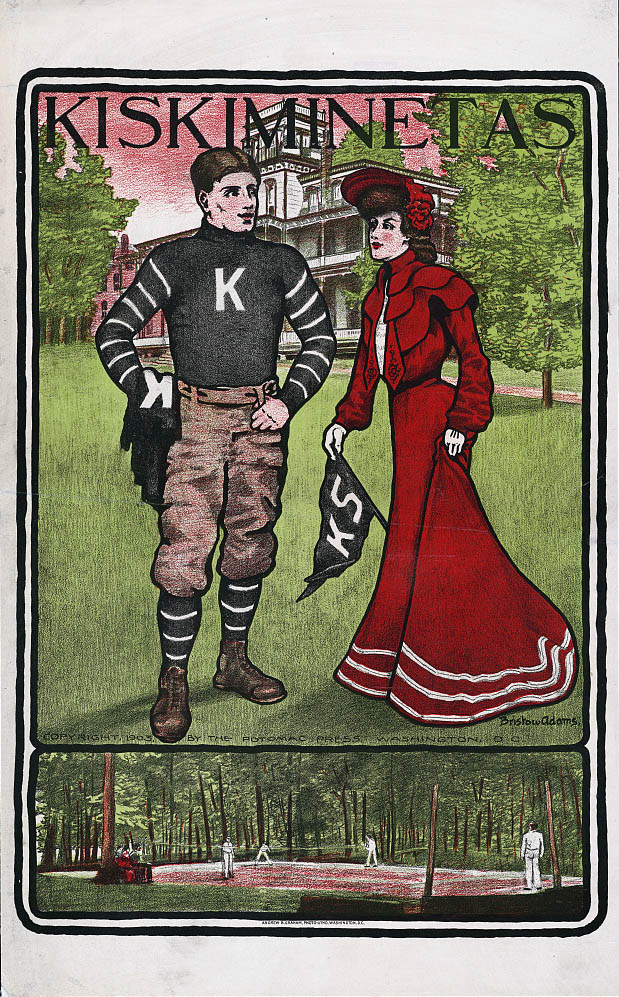
1903 Bristow Adams poster

Kiski's athletics program was somewhat renowned in the early 1900s. In 1929, collegiate football scholarships were banned nationally amid the Great Depression. The effects of this ban led Fred Lewis Pattee, a Penn State professor, to compare the university's team to Kiski's. Pattee remarked that the Penn State football team's schedule that year should not include any team "harder than Kiski."

William H. MacColl succeeded Wilson as president in 1930. James L. Marks Sr., who served as dean, and Colonel John J. Daub, who worked as the school's registrar, were also influential early faculty and administrators. By 1937, the school had four administrators and ten faculty, teaching mathematics, history, Latin, English language, Spanish language, German language, geometry, French language, science, and instrumental music. At this time, the school used a preceptoral system, in which the school sorted students into four houses. The school assigned each group to one of its four principals or officers for personalized academic counseling.

L. Montgomery Clark was elected president of Kiski's board of trustees in 1941 and was appointed Head of School in 1942. Kiski carried out many campus additions and improvements under Clark's leadership. In 1946, Wes Fesler, coach of the Pitt football team, conducted a fall training camp for the team on the campus.

John A. Pidgeon, who was then Deerfield Academy's assistant head of school, succeeded Clark upon retirement in 1957. Kiski undertook additions and improvements to the facilities and grew its academic reputation and endowment under Pidgeon's 45-year leadership. Under Pidgeon, Kiski built four new dormitories and renovated others. Kiski also constructed a new classroom building, dining hall, library, fine arts center, and administrative complex. Since 1998, Kiski has provided every student with a laptop.

=== 21st century ===
In 2005, Kiski reinstated a day student program that allows students to attend school without residing on campus. Since 2005, five of the six dormitories have undergone significant renovations to improve their sustainability measures and amenities while maintaining student capacity.

In 2009, the school constructed a student center to serve as the social hub of campus, house the college counseling office, and host events throughout the year.

In 2015, the school renovated the Ross Athletic Center, expanding it to include a new fitness center and multi-use gymnasium. The school also expanded academic facilities in 2015 by adding a Makerspace, a do-it-yourself (DIY) workshop and fabrication studio, and completing the Zeigler Science Center in 2019.

In 2023, Kiski's Board of Trustees voted unanimously to open enrollment to girls. Co-education at Kiski had been considered seriously at several points between 1990 and 2020, but its implementation in Fall 2024 resulted from the lasting impacts of the COVID-19 pandemic and a rapidly changing landscape for small boarding schools in the United States.

== Governance ==
A Board of Trustees governs Kiski. John Jacob serves as the current board chair, while Ellen Swank serves as vice chair. Other notable board members include:

- Edda L. Fields-Black
- Robert Gleason
- James P. Moore Jr.
- Christine Toretti

The Head of School is Dr. Mark Ott.

== Admissions ==
Kiski is a selective school that chooses a student body from an applicant pool. Kiski uses the Standard Application Online (SAO) to evaluate prospective students.

Application Timeline
Parents and students may begin the application process as early as October for admission the following year. The school requires each applicant to visit the campus and have an interview. Kiski's Admission Committee begins meeting in February each year to review applications for the next school year. The school generally notifies candidates of admission decisions by March 10 every year. The school typically requires parents to submit enrollment contracts and deposits by April 10.

Day Students
While Kiski is predominantly a boarding institution, it has a day student population. The school accepts day students living within a short driving distance of the campus.

Post-Graduates
Kiski accepts postgraduate students who have already achieved their high school diploma and pursue additional secondary education before college. PG students can compete in the school's athletics program and participate in school activities.

Naval Academy Foundation
Kiski partners with the United States Naval Academy to prepare candidates for the Naval Academy. USNA candidates enroll in Kiski's postgraduate program, complete five to six core classes, and participate in athletic programs and other extracurricular activities. The school has been enrolling Naval Academy Foundation candidates since the late 1960s.

== Curriculum ==
Kiski provides a college preparatory curriculum in mathematics, science, world languages, the arts, English language, history, electives, and programs in health and wellness, ethics, and personal development. Kiski offers a range of honors, advanced, and independent study courses. Kiski's STEAM, the school's ninth-grade science course, focuses on science, technology, engineering, arts, and math.

Kiski's Leadership and Character Development Program offers experiences ranging from Maker workshops to explorations of sustainability and community service.

The school is affiliated with the Cum Laude Society and National Honor Society, which recognize academic achievement.

=== Grades ===
The school's teachers grade students each quarter. The head of school meets individually with students to report on their academic progress after each grading period. Quarterly grade reports are available online to both students and parents. Students receive percentage grades for each marking period based on academic performance. The school also assigns each student an "effort grade" on a scale from A (outstanding effort) to F (deplorable effort) to evaluate a student's effort within a course, in addition to academic grades.

Students who distinguish themselves scholastically through ability and effort may be eligible for special recognition:

Honor Roll. Average of 85% or above, with no grade lower than 70% and not more than one effort grade below "C."

High Honor Roll. Average of 95% or above, with no grade lower than 80%, and not more than one effort grade below "C."

Effort Honor Roll. At least four "A" effort grades, with no effort grade below "B."

The school publishes these three lists at the end of each academic quarter. The school accords special privileges to students who have earned a place on one of these lists.

The school confers the academic title of valedictorian upon the member of the graduating class with the highest cumulative weighted grade point average based on coursework completed at Kiski during the junior and senior years. The valedictorian has the opportunity to deliver an address at Commencement.

=== Graduation requirements ===
Every candidate for graduation must complete twenty credits, including:

- four years of English
- four years of mathematics
- three years of history
- three years of science
- two years of foreign language
- two years of arts

=== Evening study hall ===
Each evening, Monday through Thursday, the school requires all boarding students to engage in academic pursuits. The evening study time allows students to visit their teachers' homes for extra help and general coursework assistance. Kiski encourages students to seek out teachers, most of whom live on campus.

== Extracurricular activities ==
=== Athletics ===
Kiski emphasizes athletics, requiring students to participate in a single sport each season. Kiski has established 23 athletic teams, including:

Fall
- Cross country
- Football
- Golf
- Soccer

Winter

- Basketball
- Hockey
- Swimming
- Wrestling

Spring

- Baseball
- Lacrosse
- Tennis
- Track and field

Kiski athletics predominantly occur in the school's 75,000-square-foot (7,000 m²) Ross Athletic Center, on the high school track, the nine-hole golf course, the campus cross-country trails, or in the baseball and soccer facilities.

=== Activities ===
Prefects
Kiski's student governance relies upon prefects. Prefects serve as resident assistants as well as members of the school's student leadership. Prefects are assigned to live in the dormitories of first- and second-year students. Among other responsibilities, prefects counsel younger students and help dorm heads with evening study hall and lights-out. During the fourth academic quarter, the faculty and matriculating prefects elect students to serve as prefects for the next school year. Kiski prefects answer to a senior prefect known as the Head Prefect, the student body leader.

The Cougar Cup
The school participates in a "Cougar Cup" competition each school year. Each student is assigned to be either a member of a Loyalhanna team or a Conemaugh team. The year-long competition includes both athletic and academic challenges.

Clubs
Clubs at Kiski are largely student-organized and vary from year to year. The school has historically seen students organize the following clubs, among others:

- Astronomy
- Chess club
- National Speech and Debate Association
- Clay pigeon shooting
- French
- Spanish
- Woodworking

=== Traditions ===
==== School dress code ====
During the academic day, meals, and school assemblies, all students must wear a coat and tie in accordance with the school dress code. Students must wear a sports coat or a suit coat, a dress shirt, a tie, belted trousers or a skirt, leather dress shoes, and dress socks. Students must wear a white dress shirt for formal evening meals.

Students must wear gray dress pants with a belt, a white shirt, a tie, a blue blazer, and dress shoes for special school events.

Upon graduation, the school awards students a black-and-white striped tie.

== Campus ==
The 350-acre campus overlooks the small town of Saltsburg, Pennsylvania, approximately 30 miles east of Pittsburgh, PA.

=== Buildings ===
Athletic Complex
The Carroll "Beano" Cook Outdoor Athletic Center is the school's outdoor athletic complex. The Orr Track and Field consists of an outdoor track and turf field lined for football, soccer, and lacrosse.

Ross Athletic Center
The Ross Athletic Center (RAC) is the school's 75,000-square-foot athletic center. The RAC includes the Jacob Multi-Purpose Gymnasium, a training area for soccer, lacrosse, tennis, and baseball, and an indoor walking track. The RAC also includes weight and cardio training rooms, athletic training and health suite, Basketball court, wrestling, and baseball room, and the McCutcheon Natatorium. The Ross Athletic Center also houses athletic department offices and film/meeting rooms. It features upgraded locker equipment rooms and storage areas. The athletic center's façade keeps with the traditional Kiski campus-wide appearance, but the inside is modern.

Turley Dining Hall
Turley Dining Hall is the school's dining facility. Kiski students and faculty gather in Turley for meals. Students and faculty eat together in a family-style setup. This long-standing school tradition reflects the school's early preceptorial structure.

Zeigler Science Center
Zeigler Science Center (ZSC) houses the school's physics and STEAM courses as well as biology and life sciences. The building provides a transitional space for teachers to move from lecture to experiment with movable classroom furniture.

Makerspace
The Makerspace is located in the MacPhail (formerly known as Heath) Classroom Building and provides a suite of hand tools and consumable materials, including a CNC router, laser cutter, and 3D printers. The Makerspace hosts the school's Inventionland curriculum, where students build, market, and pitch invention ideas, emphasizing graphic design, engineering, public speaking, and patent research.

Yukevich Quadrangle
The Yukevich Quad is the center of the school's campus. Old Main, Zeigler Science Center, Heath Classroom Building, MacColl Dorm, Swank Student Center, Pidgeon Library, and the Rogers Fine Arts Center border the Quad. It features an ample green space where Kiski students play Disc golf or view outdoor movies.

Swank Student Center
The Swank Student Center (SSC) is near the main classroom building, the library, and the residence halls. The student center is the hub of campus life and a place for students' social interactions, personal interests, and leisure activities outside classroom hours. The SSC contains the school's college counseling office, campus bookstore, snack bar, radio station, TV gaming rooms, and a large fire pit on the back patio.

John A. Pidgeon Library
The John A. Pidgeon Library is the "learning commons" of The Kiski School. The library, constructed and opened in 1993, provides a wide range of print and non-print resources for students and faculty members. The Bradley Reading Room offers a comfortable area for casual reading or study and houses current periodicals. Access to the online catalog, various subscription databases, and reference resources is available through the campus network. In addition to Kiski's shelf collection of more than 20,000 titles, the library is a member of ACCESS PA, a statewide online database of nearly 3,000 libraries. This database makes 44 million items available for Kiski students to borrow from these libraries. Additionally, the library subscribes to several research databases covering history, literature, science, photo archives, biographical information, and other digital tools for research and study.

The school named the building after the former head of school, Pidgeon, who served for 45 years.

=== Dormitories ===
Students live in double occupancy student rooms in six dormitories:

- Hoag Hall (girls' dormitory)
- Vlahos Hall
- Fosnaugh Hall
- Daub Hall
- MacColl Hall
- McClintock Hall

Typically, two or more faculty members, including their families and pets, live in apartments within each dormitory. All dormitories have a common social room, called the Day Room, with a television, DVD player, recreational furniture, and at least one table game such as pool, table tennis, or air hockey. The school furnishes each student in the dorm rooms with a bed, mattress, closet or hanging space for clothes, a desk, a desk chair, and a chest of drawers. All dormitory rooms have wireless access to the campus network.

== Notable alumni ==
- Bill Amos – College football player and coach
- Tony Bova – Football player for the Pittsburgh Steelers during the 1940s
- Daryll Clark '04 (graduated from Ursuline High School in Youngstown, Ohio) – Penn State quarterback
- James Clark – NFL player for the Pittsburgh Steelers
- Beano Cook '49 – College football commentator
- David Conrad – American actor
- Jim Daniell – American football offensive tackle and defensive tackle
- George Demas – American football guard in the National Football League
- Rafael de Medina, 20th Duke of Feria – Member of the Spanish aristocracy
- Bill Edgar – American football player for the Buffalo All-Americans and the Akron Pros
- David Egbo – Nigerian professional soccer player for Vancouver Whitecaps FC
- Doc Elliott – American football player
- Curtis Enis '94 – NFL player for the Chicago Bears (1998–2000); All-American Penn State running back
- Ralph Fritz – American football player and coach
- John Greene – American collegiate wrestler and football player
- Howard Groskloss '27 – MLB second base player for the Pittsburgh Pirates (1930–1932)
- Bob "Bones" Hamilton '32 – halfback for the 1934–1936 Stanford University "Vow Boys" teams; inducted to the College Football Hall of Fame in 1972
- Jack Hanna '65 – Zookeeper, television personality; Columbus Zoo and Aquarium director emeritus
- Andy Hastings – All-American running back for the Pitt Panthers 1916 national championship football team
- Bob Ingalls – American football player and coach
- Stan Keck – Hall of Fame college football player
- Richard Kneedler '61 – Franklin & Marshall College President Emeritus
- Paul Kromer – American football player
- Timothy K. Lewis '72 – former United States federal judge for the 3d Cir. and W.D. Pa.
- Jim MacMurdo – American football player
- Tom Maentz '53 – American football player
- Bob Mathias '49 – Decathlete; Olympic gold medalist at the 1948 and 1952 games; Republican U.S. Representative for California's 18th congressional district (1967–1975)
- Mike Milligan – American football player and coach of football and basketball
- Bob Millman – American football player
- Bill Moore – American football player
- James P. Moore Jr. '71 – U.S. Government official, television commentator, Professor of the Practice at Georgetown University, author
- Cliff Montgomery – American football player
- Jim "Monk" Moscrip '32 – All-American end for the 1934–1936 Stanford University "Vow Boys" teams; inducted to the College Football Hall of Fame in 1985
- John Murtha '51 – Democratic U.S. Representative from Pennsylvania's 12th congressional district 1972–2010
- Paul Riblett – American football player
- Herb Stein – American football player
- Russ Stein – American football player
- Harry Stuhldreher '21 – Member of Notre Dame's "Four Horsemen"; football coach for Villanova and University of Wisconsin–Madison
- Heinie Weisenbaugh – NFL running back for the Pittsburgh Pirates and Boston Redskins
- Gust Zarnas – College football All-American and professional football player
