= James P. Moore Jr. =

American government official and executive

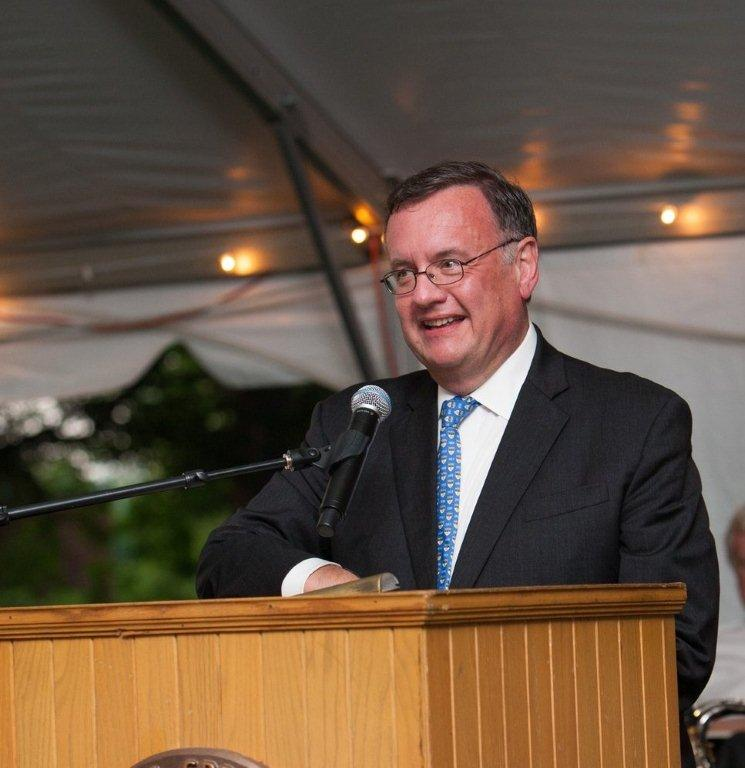
- James P. Moore Jr.

Assistant Secretary of Commerce for Trade Development, U.S. Department of Commerce
- In office September 1987 – April 1989

Board Member, U.S. Overseas Private Investment Corporation
- In office September 1987 – April 1989

Board Member, Export-Import Bank of the United States
- In office September 1987 – April 1989

Personal details
- Born: 1953 (age 72–73)
- Education: The Kiski School
- Alma mater: Rutgers University (BA); University of Pittsburgh (MA)
- Occupation: Civil servant, author, professor, businessperson

James Patrick Moore Jr. (born 1953 in Illinois) is an author, professor, television commentator, lecturer, corporate executive, nonprofit CEO, and former senior government official. Today, he serves as the founder, President and CEO of the Washington Institute for Business, Government, and Society headquartered in Washington, D.C. Just prior to launching the Washington Institute, he taught international business, corporate ethics, and leadership and management at the McDonough School of Business at Georgetown University while sitting on a number of corporate and nonprofit boards both in the United States and overseas. He also served as Executive Director of the Business and Public Policy Initiative at the McDonough School of Business at Georgetown University.

== Early life and education ==
Moore was born in Joliet, Illinois while his father, Dr. James P. Moore, was in medical residency. His mother, Dorothy Robinette Woodring Moore, was the head of the World War II Canteen at Joseph Horne Department Store in Pittsburgh and served as an assistant to the legendary Gwilym Price, President and CEO of the Westinghouse Electric Corporation, in the years after the war.

The Moore family settled in Ford City, Pennsylvania in 1954 where Moore’s father set up his medical practice. Moore graduated from Kiskiminetas Springs School, better known as The Kiski School in Saltsburg, Pennsylvania in 1971 where he headed up several student organizations and founded what became the School's largest organization, the St. Andrew Society which helped serve the poor by donating groceries, books, toys, and educational supplies throughout the region. He then was graduated from Rutgers College of Rutgers University in 1975 with highest distinction in political science. It was there that he headed for two years the acclaimed Rutgers Glee Club, now known as the Rutgers University Glee Club. He then went on to receive a Masters in Public and International Affairs at the Graduate School of Public and International Affairs at the University of Pittsburgh in 1976.

== Government career ==
From graduate school Moore was hired as a legislative assistant to Congressman William Ketchum, a Republican from Bakersfield, California who sat on the House Ways and Means Committee. After the Congressman’s death in 1978, he was named legislative director for the newly elected Congressman Charles Pashayan of Fresno, California. During his tenure on Capitol Hill he helped to draft several pieces of major legislation enacted into law related to business, government spending, and foreign policy.

In 1980 he decided to return to his legal residence in Western Pennsylvania to run for the U.S. House of Representatives. The political realities of reapportionment that year, however, prevented him from doing so. Consequently, he absorbed himself in the duties of the Board of the National Air and Space Museum of the Smithsonian Institution, to which he had been appointed by President Ronald Reagan. He became heavily involved in the selection of a new executive director for the museum and was a major proponent and force in having the private sector underwrite a greater share of museum activities.

Three years later Commerce Secretary Malcolm Baldrige Jr. appointed Moore as his Deputy Assistant Secretary for Trade Information and Analysis as well as the Head of the U.S. delegation to the Industry Committee of the Organisation for Economic Co-operation and Development (OECD) in Paris, France. As a result of a major reorganization within the Department, he soon was made responsible for monitoring, analyzing, promoting, and working with U.S. industry at home and abroad on behalf of the U.S. Government. He also worked with the Director-General of the U.S. and Foreign Commercial Service, now known as the United States Commercial Service in overseeing the commercial operations in U.S. embassies around the world. In addition he held the investment portfolio for the U.S. government in attracting foreign investment into the United States. During this period he traveled extensively throughout the United States and around the globe to represent and speak on behalf of the interests of U.S. industry, delivering numerous speeches, some of which were in French and German.

Moore also led a five-member U.S. delegation to Lisbon, Portugal in the aftermath of Portugal's accession to the European Union to advise the government and private sector regarding its views on how to work towards a greater free market economy after years of socialism. He also held the rank of ambassador while representing the United States before the Bureau of International Expositions in Paris, France.

The Secretary then asked him to serve as Principal Deputy Assistant Secretary for International Economic Policy. It was in this position that he worked with country desk officers to help execute and maintain bilateral and multilateral trade and economic relationships. He headed negotiations on behalf of the U.S. Government with such countries as China, Japan, South Korea, Spain, Brazil, and Saudi Arabia. He helped to initiate talks with Canada that led to the creation of the Canada–United States Free Trade Agreement which later was absorbed into the North American Free Trade Agreement (NAFTA). He also was one of the senior negotiators in launching the Uruguay Round of Multilateral Trade Negotiations which led to the creation of the World Trade Organization (WTO).

In 1988 he was named the chief negotiator for the United States and worked with a team of forty U.S. officials across different departments and agencies in concluding what would become the last trade and economic agreement between the United States and the Soviet Union. He worked closely with Secretary of Commerce C. William Verity, the former CEO of Armco (known today as AK Steel Holding), Chairman of the Board of the U.S. Chamber of Commerce, and Chairman of the U.S.-Soviet Business Council. Verity had been a long time business and political authority on the Soviet Union. With his support and that of President Reagan, Moore advanced creating a series of business joint ventures between U.S. and Soviet business leaders in response to Soviet President Mikhail Gorbachev's opening up of the Soviet market, better known as perestroika. The rationale for doing so was to allow Soviet businesses to understand how the free market worked in the West and to find ways to see how U.S. and Soviet businesses could work together into the future. Moore also addressed the sensitive issue of the Soviet Jewish community which faced immigration quotas at the time. He met privately with Jewish leaders both inside and outside the Soviet Union to explain the government's approach and to ensure that the position of the U.S. Government in moving forward with an agreement would be help advance the objectives of Soviet Jewry.

It was during this period that President Ronald Reagan nominated Moore to serve as Assistant Secretary of Commerce for Trade Development. Confirmed unanimously by the U.S. Senate, he worked with nine deputy assistant secretaries covering such U.S. industrial sectors as aerospace, textiles, services, consumer goods, basic industries, and high technology. He also was confirmed unanimously to be a member of the Board of the U.S. Overseas Private Investment Corporation (OPIC) and sat on the board of the Export-Import Bank of the United States (ex officio) where he was involved in helping to provide some of the first financing of projects in the former Communist countries of Eastern and Central Europe. He also was a member of the Committee on Foreign Investment in the United States (CFIUS), which reviewed sensitive foreign investments in the United States pertaining to national security. In addition, he served simultaneously as U.S. Ambassador to the Bureau of International Expositions in Paris, France.

== Immediate post-government career ==
At the conclusion of the Reagan Administration, Moore was named a distinguished fellow at the business school of the University of Colorado, Denver. During that time, he helped trigger the launch of the Global Forum in Aspen, Colorado which brought together global leaders from business, government, and academia to discuss critical issues of the day. Serving as its chairman, with the university serving as the secretariat, he helped organize its first conference on the post-Communist transition of the Soviet Union. The four-day meeting, covered gavel to gavel by C-SPAN, consisted of top business and political leaders from the United States and the Soviet Union. Several of the Soviet participants would later be appointed ministers by Soviet President Boris Yeltsin and Russian President Vladimir Putin.

During this period Moore founded ATI, an investment banking firm, with offices in Washington, London, Doha, and Moscow. He also accepted the Vice Chairmanship of the International Press Center and Club in Moscow, whose mission was to work with journalists from the former Soviet Union to provide understanding and technical know how on the workings of a free press. The multimillion-dollar complex hosted President Yeltsin and world leaders who delivered speeches on a wide range of subjects, much like the National Press Club in Washington.

== American Prayer Project ==
Beginning in October 1997, Moore became engaged in writing the first of three books on the subject of prayer in the context of American history. He quickly found through the Library of Congress that nothing had been written on the topic. That discovery led him to begin to research and ultimately write One Nation Under God: The History of Prayer in America and its publication on November 1, 2005 by Doubleday.

The book was adapted into an audio production by Random House Audio. Joining Moore in reading the book were 20 prominent Americans who gave voices to the characters in his book. Some of those narrators were Senator John McCain (Stonewall Jackson, George Patton), actor Roscoe Lee Browne (Benjamin Franklin, Frederick Douglass), journalist Hugh Sidey (Abraham Lincoln, Walt Disney), Broadway star Ben Vereen (spirituals of the slaves), and historic novelist Gail Buckley (Harriet Tubman, Eleanor Roosevelt). U.S. Senate Chaplain Lloyd John Ogilvie, actor David Conrad (Woodrow Wilson, Douglas MacArthur, J.C.Penney) and U.S. House Chaplain Daniel Coughlin recreated the prayers they delivered to their respective chambers the day after September 11, 2001, and former astronaut Frank Borman recited the prayer he transmitted on Apollo 8 from space to earth on Christmas in 1968.

The book also led to the creation of a series of music CDs by PBA Music Publishing, the first entitled The Many Voices of One Nation Under God. This part of the American Prayer Project was launched to show how American genre music is rooted in prayer from African American Spirituals (i.e., jazz, rhythm and blues, gospel) to the hymns of Appalachia (i.e., folk, country). The eclectic mix of composers and performers such as Leonard Bernstein, Loretta Lynn, Tupac Shakur, and Dave Brubeck show how prayer has become the inspiration to even contemporary music. Moore wrote the liner notes.

In turn, the book was brought to the television screen in a public television miniseries entitled Prayer in America. The Emmy award-winning Duncan Group produced the film with Moore acting as the consulting producer. The project, including its outreach across the United States through Outreach Extensions, was funded by a grant from the Templeton Foundation.

The film also generated a five-part program that will be video streamed into public, private, and parochial middle schools and high schools across the United States. The multimedia firm Questar distributed the program in the fall of 2008.

The American Prayer Project produced The Treasury of American Prayer, also published by Doubleday, and The Crossings Treasury of American Prayer, published by Crossings Publishers in the fall of 2008. Both books are a compilation of prayers written by Americans over the years and provide descriptions of those prayers to put them and their authors into their proper and historical context.

The American Prayer Project was launched on November 8, 2005 at Washington National Cathedral. In conjunction with the Interfaith Conference of Metropolitan Washington, Moore served as the host for the evening with performers from a dozen faith traditions.

One Nation Under God: The History of Prayer in America was also published in a "Patriot's Edition", the proceeds of which were contributed to the soldiers wounded in the Iraq and Afghanistan wars.

== Academia, lectures and commentary ==
Moore has taught international business, ethics, and management and leadership at the McDonough School of Business at Georgetown University since 1999. In 2009 he headed an academic and business executive team to China to discuss the global economic crisis and to help educate young Chinese and Indian entrepreneurs on the realities of the global marketplace. He has received several awards by the faculty and students for outstanding teaching.

He has lectured at universities and colleges around the United States including Harvard, Yale, Princeton, Columbia, the Wharton School of Finance at the University of Pennsylvania, and all of the United States service academies. He also has lectured at universities in Europe, the Middle East, Japan, and China. In addition he has addressed a wide range of audiences outside of academia from the medical staff of the Mayo Clinic to senior corporate executives at such companies as 3M, Merck, Ciba-Geigy, and the New York Stock Exchange. In 2011 and 2012 he addressed the senior executives of British corporations during the annual meeting of the Confederation of British Industry.

For more than a dozen years, Moore has been a guest commentator on CNBC, CNN, the Fox News Channel and other news programs, discussing issues from political and economic hotspots around the world to domestic politics in the United States and their impact on the domestic and global economy. His articles and speeches have been translated into dozens of languages. He was the first Westerner to be interviewed on Al Jazeera television when it was launched in 1966.

He also has written op-ed articles on a variety of subjects for the Wall Street Journal, New York Times, Washington Post, Boston Globe, and Los Angeles Times.

Moore also has written th prefaces to the books Dream World, Midnight Musings, and Surviving Hard Times by Magda Herzberger, a survivor of the Holocaust and the Nazi camps of Auschwitz, Bergen-Belsen, and Bremen. He also has written the preface to her latest book Midnight Musings.

== Awards ==
- Texas Legislature Resolution of Commendation (H.R. 13), Austin, Texas
- Inductee, Ford City Hall of Fame, Ford City, Pennsylvania
- Distinguished Alumnus Award, the Kiski School (Kiskiminetas Springs School), Saltsburg, Pennsylvania
- Beta Gamma Sigma Professorial Honoree, McDonough School of Business, Georgetown University, Washington, D.C.
- [Padre Pio] Award, Capuchin Franciscan Friars, Province of St. Augustine, Pittsburgh, Pennsylvania
- Pennsylvania Senate Resolution of Commendation, Harrisburg, Pennsylvania
- Distinguished Teaching Award, McDonough School of Business, Georgetown University, Washington, D.C.
- The CSFN Award, Sisters of the Holy Family of Nazareth and Holy Family College, Philadelphia, Pennsylvania
- Cap and Skull Society (Honorary), Rutgers College of Rutgers University
- Distinguished Fellow, University of Colorado Denver Business School, Denver, Colorado

== Selected board and council memberships ==
- The Kiski School
- Harvey Nash (Global)
- Harvey Nash (USA)
- APCO
- Center for Natural Lands Management
