= Darrow Yannet diagram =

Schematic used in physiology

- Purpose: identify how the volumes of extracellular fluid and intracellular fluid

A Darrow Yannet diagram is a schematic used in physiology to identify how the volumes of extracellular fluid and intracellular fluid alter in response to conditions such as adrenal insufficiency and SIADH.

It was developed in 1934 by Daniel C. Darrow and Herman Yannet, pediatricians from the Department of Pediatrics, Yale School of Medicine.
