= HVN =

HVN may refer to:

- Harvey Nash, an outsourcing company
- Harvey Norman, an Australian retailer
- Havelian And Out Agency railway station, in Pakistan
- Havenhouse railway station, in England
- Hawu language, spoken in Indonesia
- Heavenly Recordings, a British record label
- Tweed New Haven Airport, New Haven, Connecticut
- Vietnam Airlines (ICAO code)
