= Hilborn =

Hilborn may refer to:

- Ariana Hilborn (born 1980), US-born Latvian long-distance runner
- Neil Hilborn (born 1990), American slam poet
- Ray Hilborn (born 1947), marine biologist
- Robert Hilborn Falls (1924–2009), CMM, CD (born April 24, 1924), Chief of Defence Staff of the Canadian Forces from 1977 to 1980
- Samuel G. Hilborn (1834–1899), U.S. Representative from California.
- Stuart Hilborn (1917–2013), hot-rodder who developed early fuel injection systems for race cars
- William Carrall Hilborn (1898–1918), World War I Canadian flying ace
