= Britteney Black Rose Kapri =

American poet and author

- Born: Chicago, Illinois
- Education: Grand Valley State University
- Relatives: Helen Shiller
- Writing career
- Notable awards: Rona Jaffe Foundation Writers' Award

Britteney Black Rose Kapri is a Chicago-based author, educator, activist and poet, performer, and playwright.

== Life ==
Kapri graduated from Grand Valley State University.

She has been published in Poetry, Button Poetry, and Seven Scribes and anthologized in The BreakBeat Poets and The BreakBeat Poets Vol. 2: Black Girl Magic. Kapri has written two chapbooks:Winona and Winthrop (New School Poetics, 2014) and Black Queer Hoe (Haymarker Books, 2018 ISBN 978-1608465163). She was a winner of the 2015 Rona Jaffe Foundation Writer's Award.

== Black Queer Hoe ==
Black Queer Hoe discusses black women's sexuality and sexual liberation. Kapri included Tweets in this collection. Black Queer Hoe is about Kapri's personal experiences.

== Personal life ==
Kapri has a tattoo that reads, "Pro Black, Pro Queer, Pro Hoe."
