= Alexander James Inglis =

American author and educator

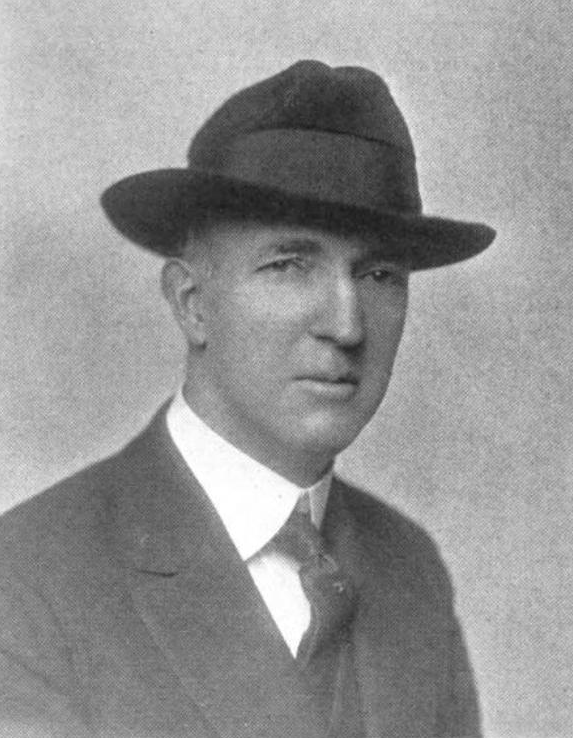
- Born: November 24, 1879; Middletown, Connecticut
- Died: April 12, 1924 (aged 44); Boston, Massachusetts
- Education: Middletown High School
- Alma mater: Wesleyan University
- Occupations: Teacher, author
- Notable work: Principles of Secondary Education

Alexander James Inglis (November 24, 1879 – April 12, 1924) was an American author and educator who was instrumental in promoting the "new American" secondary education at the beginning of the 20th century.

== Biography ==
Inglis was born in Middletown, Connecticut on November 24, 1879, to William Grey Inglis (1854–1939) and Susan Beyer Inglis (1858–1915). His father worked at a local gold and silver plating factory for 30 years before taking proprietorship of a laundromat. His grandfather, Alexander Inglis (1815–1893), was a miner who emigrated from Edinburgh, Scotland in 1852. Little is known about his childhood. In 1892, his brother Willie died of diphtheria at the age of six in Newark, New Jersey while visiting their maternal grandparents. He graduated from Middletown High School in 1898 with honors for attendance and academics. Later that year, he enrolled in Wesleyan University. He played varsity baseball and football for four years. His first professional job was as a Latin teacher at The Kiski School, a boarding school in Saltsburg, Pennsylvania, during the 1902–1903 school year. There, he also coached football and assisted with baseball. In 1903, he took a position teaching Latin at the Horace Mann School in Manhattan, New York, where he stayed through 1911. In the summer of 1905, he became a student of the American School of Classical Studies in Pompeii and Rome, Italy. He authored three Latin textbooks while a teacher at Horace Mann, two of which the school added to the curriculum.:

He died in Boston on April 12, 1924.

== Ideas ==
According to Principles of Secondary Education, three aims of secondary education are:

- Social-Civic Aim – The preparation of the individual as a prospective citizen and cooperating member of society.
- Economic-Vocational Aim – The preparation of the individual as a prospective worker and producer.
- Individualistic-Avocational Aim – The preparation of the individual for those activities … primarily involving individual action, the use of leisure, and the development of personality.

He summarized his position of what the intent of secondary education should be thusly:

Many important functions are therein involved, e.g., means of adjusting the individual and his social environment, the development of a "social mind" and social cohesion among groups of individuals, the adjustment of individual differences to the differentiated needs of society, control of the factor of selection in secondary education, educational, moral, social, and vocational guidance.

== Influence ==
The Harvard Graduate School of Education established the Inglis Lectureship in Secondary Education in his honor.

== Bibliography ==
- Key to Pearson's Latin Prose Composition, 1904
- First Book in Latin, 1906, with Virgil Prettyman
- High School Course in Latin Composition, 1909, with Charles McCoy Baker
- Principles of Secondary Education, 1918
- Inglis Intelligence Quotient Values, 1921
