= Shrinking Women =

Poem by Lily Myers

"Shrinking Women" is a poem by Lily Myers. Myers recited it at the 2013 College Unions Poetry Slam Invitational; the video was subsequently reposted by Button Poetry and HuffPost, where it went viral. The video of this performance had been viewed more than five million times by 2016. The poem explores how Myers's mother, and as she realizes, herself, have been taught to take up less space, particularly to "make room" for men, such as Myers's brother and father. For her mother, this manifests as consuming fewer calories, and Myers additionally links this to her own use of apologies when asking questions in class. When spoken, the poem is about three and a half minutes long.

At the Invitational, "Shrinking Women" won the "Best Love Poem" prize. Myers was invited on the radio show Here and Now to talk about the poem in 2014.

== Lily Myers ==
Lily Myers (born 1993 or 1994) was a sophomore at Wesleyan University when she attended the 2013 College Unions Poetry Slam Invitational. She graduated from Wesleyan University in 2015 with a degree in sociology. In 2016, she announced the release of her debut novel, This Impossible Light, which was written in verse. Similar to the poem, the novel centered on eating disorders, body image, and transgenerational trauma.
