= Bob Millman =

American football player (1903–1963)

Profile
- Position: Halfback

Personal information
- Born: May 17, 1903; Cumberland, Maryland, U.S.
- Died: March 19, 1963 (aged 59); Trenton, New Jersey, U.S.
- Listed height: 5 ft 11 in (1.80 m)
- Listed weight: 178 lb (81 kg)

Career information
- High school: The Kiski School
- College: Lafayette

Career history
- Pottsville Maroons (1925–1927)
- Stats at Pro Football Reference

Robert Dent Millman (May 17, 1903 – March 19, 1963) was a professional football player from Cumberland, Maryland. Millman attended Lafayette College and made his debut in the National Football League (NFL) in 1925 with the Pottsville Maroons and played with the team for three seasons. During his rookie year, Millman helped the Maroons win the NFL championship before a disputed rules violation stripped the title from the team.
