= Dorothea de Schweinitz =

American social worker

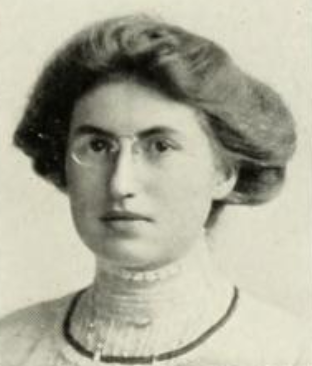
- Dorothea de Schweinitz, from the 1912 yearbook of Smith College
- Born: September 5, 1891; Nazareth, Pennsylvania, U.S.
- Died: November 1980; Washington, D.C., U.S.
- Occupation: Social worker
- Relatives: Lewis David de Schweinitz (great-grandfather); Louise de Schweinitz Darrow (sister); Daniel C. Darrow (brother-in-law)

Dorothea de Schweinitz (September 5, 1891 – November 1980) was an American social worker who specialized in employment programs. She was president of the National Vocational Guidance Association from 1925 to 1926, and was a regional director of the National Labor Relations Board, based in St. Louis, Missouri.

== Early life and education ==
Schweinitz was born in Nazareth, Pennsylvania, the daughter of Paul de Schweinitz and Mary Catherine Daniel de Schweinitz. Her father was one of six bishops of the Moravian Church in the United States, and a descendant of Nicolaus Zinzendorf. Her grandfather Robert William de Schweinitz was a noted educator, and her great-grandfather was botanist Lewis David de Schweinitz. She graduated from Smith College in 1912. She traveled and studied in Germany in 1913. She earned a master's degree from Columbia University in 1929.

== Career ==
Schweinitz worked for the YWCA in New York. She developed an employment service for students in the Philadelphia public schools. She was associated with the Industrial Research Department at the Wharton School. She was president of the Philadelphia Vocational Guidance Association from 1924 to 1925. She was president of the National Vocational Guidance Association from 1925 to 1926, and from 1937 to 1941 she was a regional director of the National Labor Relations Board, based in St. Louis, Missouri. She worked with the Office of Production Management and the War Production Board during World War II.

Schweinitz lived in Georgetown from 1942, and was active in historic preservation there. She was chair of the fine arts committee of the Georgetown Citizens Association when she testified before a congressional hearing in 1966. She was awarded the Smith College Medal in 1974. She and her sister Helena Couch donated an ancestor's embroidered handkerchief to the Moravian Museum in Bethlehem, Pennsylvania.

== Publications ==
- "The Technique of the Placement of Juvenile Workers" (1921)
- "The Place of Social Case Work in the Junior Employment Service" (1922)
- "Practical Problems of the Placement Office" (1923)
- "The Junior Employment Service" (1925)
- "Following Up the Junior Worker" (1925)
- How Workers Find Jobs: A Study of Four Thousand Hosiery Workers in Philadelphia (1932)
- "Social Legislation and the Family Case Worker" (1935)
- "Youth—Vocational Guidance—Labor: Labor Conditions Affecting the Young Worker" (1939)
- Occupations in Retail Stores
- "Joint Leadership in a Democracy" (1944)
- Labor and Management in a Common Enterprise (1949)
- Labor-Management Consultation in the Factory: The Experience of England, Sweden and Germany (1966)

== Personal life ==
She died in 1980, at the age of 89, in Washington, D.C. Her papers and those of her sister Louise de Schweinitz Darrow are in the Sophia Smith Collection of Women's History at Smith College.
