= George Demas (American football) =

American football player (1907–1977)

Profile
- Position: Guard

Personal information
- Born: January 7, 1907; Johnstown, Pennsylvania
- Died: November 16, 1977 (aged 70)
- Listed height: 6 ft 0 in (1.83 m)
- Listed weight: 194 lb (88 kg)

Career information
- High school: Allegheny Prep; The Kiski School
- College: Washington & Jefferson College

Career history
- Staten Island Stapletons (1932); Brooklyn Dodgers (1934)
- Stats at Pro Football Reference

George James Demas (January 7, 1907 — November 16, 1977) was a professional American football guard in the National Football League. He played for the Staten Island Stapletons and the Brooklyn Dodgers as well as the Philadelphia Eagles in 1933. He attended high school at Allegheny Prep in Pittsburgh and The Kiski School in Saltsburg, Pennsylvania. He attended Washington & Jefferson College.

== Notes ==
- Career statistics from NFL.com · Pro Football Reference ·
