= Bill Moore (American football) =

American football player (1912–1973)

No. 8
- Position: End

Personal information
- Born: February 4, 1912; Wheeling, West Virginia, U.S.
- Died: May 25, 1973 (aged 61); Montgomery, Pennsylvania, U.S.
- Listed height: 6 ft 1 in (1.85 m)
- Listed weight: 195 lb (88 kg)

Career information
- High school: The Kiski School
- College: North Carolina (1932–1935)
- NFL draft: 1936: undrafted

Career history
- Los Angeles Bulldogs (1936–1938); Detroit Lions (1939)

Career NFL statistics
- Games played: 9
- Stats at Pro Football Reference

William Julius Moore (February 4, 1912 – May 25, 1973) was an American football player.

Moore was born in 1912 at Wheeling, West Virginia. He attended The Kiski School in Saltsburg, Pennsylvania.

Moore then played college football at the end position for the University of North Carolina from 1932 to 1935.

He then played professional football for the Los Angeles Bulldogs of the American Professional Football League from 1936 to 1938. He was chosen as left end on the league's All-America team in 1937. He was described as "one of the fastest and smartest wingmen seen on the Coast in a long time."

Moore also played in the National Football League (NFL) as an end for the Detroit Lions. He appeared in nine games for the Lions during the 1939 season and caught six passes for 82 yards and a touchdown.

Moore died in 1973 at Montgomery, Pennsylvania.
