= Elliot Darrow =

American poet

Elliot Darrow is an American spoken word poet.

Darrow is noted for writing and performing the poem "God is Gay." A video of the performance on YouTube has over 850,000 views.

Darrow attended the University of North Carolina and majored in drama. He self-identifies as a heterosexual man and a Christian. Darrow grew up Presbyterian.

== "God is Gay" ==
The poem "God is Gay" uses biblical passages to support the theory that God is gay.

Darrow's first recorded performance of "God is Gay" was at the Flyleaf Books bookstore in Chapel Hill, North Carolina. A video of the performance was uploaded to the "Sacrificial Poets" YouTube channel on July 13, 2012. Darrow also performed the piece at the 2013 College Unions Poetry Slam Invitational.

== Other notable pieces ==
- "Red Shoes"
