= Alex Darrow =

American entrepreneur

- Born: Alex Andrew Darrow; October 4, 1993 (age 32); Santa Clara, California, U.S.
- Occupation: Entrepreneur
- Years active: 2010–present

Alex Andrew Darrow (born October 4, 1993) is an American entrepreneur best known for founding the fiscally sponsored non-profit organization PictureTheWorld. As of February 2010, he is one of the youngest executive directors of an established non-profit organization in the world.

== Personal life ==
Darrow was born in Santa Clara, California to Landy, a civil engineer, and Andrew, also a civil engineer. Darrow, along with his younger brother, was raised in Auburn, California.

The young entrepreneur began forging innovative concepts, and inventing high-tech gadgets when he was 13 years old, including a silicon mat which used a capacitive system to turn any computer monitor into a touch-screen—in pursuit of which he presented the invention to venture capitalists and received good advice, and a social application for MySpace—in pursuit of which he went as far as signing a non-disclosure agreement (NDA), and speaking with the Vice President of MySpace Music, and the COO of MySpace.

Before attending Placer High School, beginning in his sophomore year of high school, Darrow attended the private Jesuit High School (Sacramento) during the regular school year of 2007–2008, and the prestigious Phillips Academy Andover during the summer of 2008. Darrow says, after graduation, he plans on majoring in business.

On March 3, 2011, Darrow, at age 17, spoke on a panel about social entrepreneurship and social innovation at Harvard Business School. At the event, he addressed students and faculty of both Harvard Business School and the Harvard Kennedy School of Government.

== PictureTheWorld ==
=== Founding ===
Darrow officially launched PictureTheWorld in February 2010; however, the website was not launched until May 2010. The idea came to him when he decided "to start a project that really represented a large community--thousands and thousands of people coming together to support a worthy cause." He explains, "But I also wanted a project that was fun, innovative, and kind of epitomized the global community. And would allow donors to be able to participate. Not just make a monetary donation, but actually join the movement."

However, it took Darrow nearly two years to raise the funds for the launch of PictureTheWorld. Darrow earned the money by washing dishes at a pizza place, and saving all cash received for Christmas and his birthday. Eventually, he was able to establish the organization, and launch its website. Darrow, PictureTheWorld's founder and executive director, does not take a salary.

=== About ===
PictureTheWorld is a fiscally sponsored non-profit organization creating the world's largest photo-mosaic using photos submitted by people from all over the world, using the organization's website. All funds are disbursed among ten beneficiaries, including: Doctors Without Borders, 88 Bikes, the World Food Program, and UCSF Benioff Children's Hospital. PictureTheWorld will require at least 112, 896 photo submissions in order to break the current world-record for largest photo-mosaic.

The current world record for the world's largest photo-mosaic is held by The Big Picture, which was created by Helen Marshall in England in 2008. The Big Picture came through the Arts Council England, West Midland, and was supported by the BBC.
