= Filial Love =

- Directed by: Étienne Arnaud
- Produced by: Eclair American
- Starring: Barbara Tennant; Lamar Johnstone
- Distributed by: Universal Film Manufacturing Company
- Release date: September 19, 1912
- Running time: two reels
- Country: United States
- Languages: Silent; English titles

Filial Love is a 1912 silent short film directed by Étienne Arnaud and starring Barbara Tennant and Lamar Johnstone. It was produced by the Éclair Company.

The film had 2 reels.

== Plot ==
A young boy goes to Washington, where his father was jailed, and tries to help him.

== Cast ==
- Barbara Tennant as The Mother
- Lamar Johnstone as Accused Father
- Clara Horton as Child

== Preservation ==
A print is preserved at The Library of Congress.

== Reception ==
Les Cahiers de la Cinémathèque praised the production and indicated the short offered splendid views of Pittsburgh and Washington.

== Legacy ==
The film was screened in the Cinémathèque française in 2007 as part of an Éclair film retrospective.
