= Sabrina Benaim =

Canadian poet

- Born: November 30, 1987 (age 38); Toronto, Canada
- Occupations: Writer; slam poet
- Writing career
- Language: English
- Genre: Poetry
- Subjects: Mental health; family; love
- Notable work: Explaining My Depression To My Mother

Sabrina Benaim (born November 30, 1987, in Toronto, Canada) is a writer, performance artist, and slam poet. Benaim was a winner of the 2014 Toronto Poetry Slam. She is best known for her poem "Explaining My Depression To My Mother."

== Personal life ==
Sabrina Benaim was born November 30, 1987, in Toronto, Canada. She was a member of Canadian championship-winning 2014 Toronto Poetry Slam Team. She is currently a coach of the 2016 Toronto Poetry Slam (TPS) team. At age 23, Benaim was found to have a benign tumor in her throat. She took to performance poetry as a way to cope with her health complications, and to raise awareness for issues like anxiety and depression. She also represented Toronto at the Women Of The World Poetry Slam.

== Career ==
She took off on social media through her poem "Explaining My Depression To My Mother." From there she did a tour of The UK, Australia, US & Canada connecting with many of her fans through her poetry, books, and storytelling which furthered the take off of her career. Her poetry tackles issues that are relevant in our society like mental health, family, and love. Benaim has written poetry for ESPNW, the Government of Canada, and she made her television debut on Sport Chek. Benaim is well known for performing on the Button Poetry YouTube series.

== Works ==
=== Poems ===
- Explaining My Depression To My Mother (Genius)
- June (Button poetry)
- What I Told the Doctor (Genius)
- Hurdles/Dreams (Button Poetry)
- What I Told the Doctor the Second Time (Button Poetry)
- So, I'm Talking to My Depression (Button Poetry)
- The Slow Now (Button Poetry)
- The Loneliest Sweet Potato (Button Poetry)

=== Books ===
- Depression and Other Magic Tricks (2017) ISBN 9781943735204
- I Love You, Call Me Back (2021) ISBN 9780593185872

== Awards ==
- Nominated for Goodreads Best Poetry 2017 Choice Awards.
- Grand Slam Champion of the 2014 Toronto Poetry Slam
