= List of programs broadcast by NewsNation =

This is a list of television programs currently and formerly broadcast by NewsNation and WGN America, a Chicago-based cable channel.

== Current programming ==
=== Breakfast show ===
- Morning in America (2021)
  - Weekend Morning in America (2021)

=== Rolling news ===
- NewsNation Live (2022)
- NewsNation Live Weekend (2025)
- NewsNation Now (2023)
- NewsNation Prime (2020; weekends-only since 2022)

=== Talk ===
- Batya! (2025)
- Cuomo (2022)
- Elizabeth Vargas Reports (2023)
- Jesse Weber Live (2026)
- Katie Pavlich Tonight (2026)
- On Balance with Leland Vittert (2021)
- The Hill (2023)
  - The Hill Sunday (2025)

== Former programming ==
=== Original programming ===
==== Original ====
Title	Premiere date	Seasons
Salem	April 20, 2014	3
Manhattan	July 27, 2014	2
Outsiders	January 26, 2016	2
Underground	March 9, 2016	2
Almost Paradise	March 30, 2020	1
Dog's Most Wanted	September 4, 2019	1

==== Acquired ====
Title	Premiere date	Seasons
Pure	July 7, 2017	2
Bellevue	January 23, 2018	1
Shoot the Messenger	February 26, 2018	1
100 Code	May 29, 2018	1
Carter	August 7, 2018	
Gone	February 27, 2019	1
The Disappearance	July 9, 2019	1

=== Syndicated series ===
- The Andy Griffith Show (1978–99)
- Bewitched (1978–83; 1990–94; 1996–97; 2008–17)
- Daniel Boone (1978–80)
- The Dick Van Dyke Show (1978–83; 1985–91)
- Family Affair (1978–82)
- The Flintstones (1978–81, 1991–95)
- Gilligan's Island (1978–82)
- I Dream of Jeannie (1978–85; 1990–92, 2008–12)
- Love American Style (1978–81)
- My Three Sons (1978–80)
- The New Soupy Sales Show (1978–79)
- The Odd Couple (1978–87; 2017-20)
- The Phil Donahue Show (1978–82)
- Soul Train (1978–September 29, 2008)
- Wild Kingdom (1978–82; 1984–87)
- Bugs Bunny and Friends (1979–90)
- Carol Burnett and Friends (1979–87)
- The Cisco Kid (1979–88)
- Dennis the Menace (1959 TV series) (1979–80; 1982–84)
- Groovie Goolies and Friends (1979–80, 1983–84)
- In Search of... (1979–86)
- The Lone Ranger (1979–92)
- Maude (1979–80)
- McHale's Navy (1979–80)
- Star Blazers (1979–80)
- Star Trek (1979–80)
- Zane Grey Theater (1979–85)
- Adventures of Superman (1980–89)
- Barney Miller (1980–88; 2007–10)
- The Bullwinkle Show (1980–83; 1993; April 18-September 26, 2009)
- Good Times (1980–90)
- Hollywood Squares (1980–81)
- Independent Network News/USA Tonight (1980–90, produced by sister station WPIX in New York)
- Kung Fu (1980–90)
- The Mike Douglas Show (1980–81)
- The Phil Silvers Show (1980–84)
- Prisoner: Cell Block H (1980–82)
- Scooby-Doo (1980–86)
- Solid Gold (1980–84)
- Welcome Back, Kotter (1980–91)
- The $50,000 Pyramid (1981)
- America's Top 10 (1981–86)
- Best of Saturday Night (1981–83)
- Hogan's Heroes (1981–84; 1986–93)
- The Incredible Hulk (1981–82)
- Laverne & Shirley (1981–88)
- The Lawrence Welk Show (1981–82)
- Little House on the Prairie (1981–89)
- The Muppet Show (1981–88)
- The New You Asked for It (1981–83)
- The Pink Panther Show (1981–84)
- Rhoda (1981–82; 1984–85; 1987–88)
- Sergeant Preston of the Yukon (1981–82)
- Tarzan (1981–84)
- At the Movies (1982–90)
- The Big Valley (1982–87)
- Charlie's Angels (1982–85; 1988–91, 1995–97, 2009–12)
- The Jeffersons (1982–90; 1992–96)
- Rawhide (1982–88)
- Soap (1982–92)
- Super Friends (1982–87)
- The Twilight Zone (1959) (1982–94)
- Alice (1983–89)
- Alvin and the Chipmunks (1983–84)
- The Beverly Hillbillies (1983–88; 2003–11)
- Chico and the Man (1983–84)
- Fantasy Island (1983–86, 1989–90)
- Lou Grant (1983–88; 1991–93)
- The Love Boat (1983–92)
- One Day at a Time (1983–86; 1988–91)
- Rowan & Martin's Laugh-In (1983–84)
- Tales from the Darkside (1983–91, 2000–01, 2008–13)
- WKRP in Cincinnati (1983–90, 2008–September 6, 2009)
- The Abbott and Costello Show (1984–85; 1990–91)
- The Adventures of William Tell (1984–85)
- Archie Bunker's Place (1984–90)
- Benson (1984–89)
- The Dukes of Hazzard (1984–85; 1988–89; 1991)
- Family (1984–85)
- The Greatest American Hero (1984–86)
- Greatest Sports Legends (1984–86)
- Guilty or Innocent (1984)
- Heathcliff (1984–87)
- Leave It to Beaver (1984–85; 1987–92)
- Lifestyles of the Rich and Famous (1984–87; 1991–94)
- The Tony Randall Show (1984; 1987–88)
- The Waltons (1984–88)
- The Wild Wild West (1984–93)
- Cannon (1985–87)
- Carson's Comedy Classics (1985–86, 1988–90)
- Dempsey and Makepeace (1985–86)
- Fame (1985–87; 1994–97)
- FTV (1985–86)
- G.I. Joe: A Real American Hero (1985–89)
- It's a Great Life (1985–86)
- It's a Living (1985–88)
- M.A.S.K. (1985–87, 1990–91)
- Police Story (1985–90)
- Puttin' on the Hits (1985–88)
- SCTV (1985; 1987–90)
- Star Games (1985–86)
- Terrytoons (1985)
- The Transformers (1985–88)
- The Bob Newhart Show (1986–87; 1990; 1992–93)
- The Facts of Life (1986–92)
- Falcon Crest (1986–87)
- Ghostbusters (1986–89)
- The Honeymooners (1986–99, 2008–09)
- Jem and the Holograms (1986–89)
- Magnum, P.I. (1986–92, 1996, 2004–07)
- One Big Family (1986–87)
- Photon (1986–87)
- Smurfs' Adventures (1986–89)
- Trapper John, M.D. (1986–91)
- What a Country! (1986–87)
- The White Shadow (1986–87, 1992–94)
- You Write the Songs (1986–87)
- Adventures of Teddy Ruxpin (1987–88)
- BraveStarr (1987–89)
- Bustin' Loose (1987–88)
- Captain Power and the Soldiers of the Future (1987–88)
- Charles in Charge (1987–92, 1994–95, 1998–2002)
- Cheers (1987–90, 2009–12)
- Geraldo (1987–98)
- Mama's Family (1987–88)
- Popeye (1987–88)
- Spiral Zone (1987–89)
- Star Search (1987–95)
- Visionaries: Knights of the Magical Light (1987–88)
- Fun House (1988–90)
- Gumby (1988–90)
- Hill Street Blues (1988–90)
- Monsters (1988–91)
- The New Yogi Bear Show (1988–90)
- Night Court (1988–97)
- Runaway with the Rich and Famous (1988–94)
- She's the Sheriff (1988–89)
- T. and T. (1988–90)
- Triple Threat (1988–89)
- Chip 'n Dale: Rescue Rangers (1989–92)
- DuckTales (1989–92)
- The Joan Rivers Show (1989–93)
- Newhart (1989–90, 1995–96, 2008–10)
- Remote Control (1989–90)
- RollerGames (1989–90)
- 21 Jump Street (1990–91)
- Eischied (1990–91)
- Hangin' In (1990–91)
- Inch High, Private Eye (1990–91)
- It Takes a Thief (1990–91)
- The Space Kidettes (1990–91)
- St. Elsewhere (1990–91)
- Super Force (1990–91)
- Wake, Rattle & Roll (1990–91)
- WCW Pro Wrestling (1990–91; localized version branded as "WCW Pro Chicago")
- Wheelie and the Chopper Bunch (1990–91)
- Young Samson (1990–91)
- Gidget (1991–93)
- Kidd Video (1991–92)
- Kojak (1991–95)
- Now it Can Be Told (1991–92)
- Saban's Adventures of the Little Mermaid (1991–93)
- Saved by the Bell (1991–99)
- Street Justice (1991–93)
- Under 18 Not Admitted (1991)
- Video Power (1991–92)
- Matlock (September 1991 – 2014)
- The Apollo Comedy Hour (1992–95)
- Captain N & The Video Game Masters (1992–93)
- The Dennis Miller Show (1992)
- Designing Women (1992–94)
- Highlander: The Series (1992–98)
- Perry Mason (1992–96)
- Prime Suspect (1992–94)
- That Girl (1992–95)
- The Three Stooges (1992–93)
- California Dreams (1993–99; 2003)
- Court TV: Inside America's Courts (1993–96)
- Emergency Call (1993–94)
- Garfield and Friends (1993–94)
- The Hallo Spencer Show (1993–94)
- The Jane Whitney Show (1993–94)
- MotorWeek (1993–96)
- The Partridge Family (1993)
- Renegade (1993–96)
- Stunt Dawgs (1993–94)
- Beach Clash (1994–95)
- Boogies Diner (1994–95)
- Can We Shop?! (1994)
- The Charles Perez Show (1994–96)
- Dennis the Menace (1986 TV series) (1994–96)
- Love Connection (1994–95)
- Quincy, M.E. (1994–96)
- The Rat Patrol (1994–96)
- The Road (1994–95)
- Simon & Simon (1994–98)
- Superhuman Samurai Syber-Squad (1994–95)
- T. J. Hooker (1994–95)
- Black Sheep Squadron (1995)
- Family Matters (1995–2003)
- Hercules: The Legendary Journeys (1995–2000)
- In the Heat of the Night (1995–2001, 2003–05, September 15, 2008–July 16, 2022)
- One West Waikiki (1995–96)
- Out of the Blue (1995–96)
- TaleSpin (1995)
- Xena: Warrior Princess (1995-2001)
- The Adventures of Sinbad (1996–99)
- Beauty and the Beast (1996–97)
- Beverly Hills, 90210 (1996–98)
- Bzzz! (1996–97, 2000–01)
- Empty Nest (1996–99)
- Wiseguy (1996–98)
- The Woody Woodpecker Show (1996–97)
- Coach (1997–99, 2008–09)
- Earth: Final Conflict (1997–2002)
- Night Man (1997–99, 2001–02)
- The Streets of San Francisco (1997)
- Blossom (1998–99)
- Full House (1998–2003)
- Hawaii Five-O (1998–2000)
- MacGyver (1998-2002)
- Malibu, CA (1998-2001)
- Webster (1998–99)
- Beastmaster (1999-2004)
- Caroline in the City (1999–2002)
- The Cosby Show (1999–2010)
- The Fresh Prince of Bel-Air (1999–2004)
- Knight Rider (1999-2000)
- The Lost World (1999-2004)
- The Parent 'Hood (1999–2002)
- Pensacola: Wings of Gold (1999-2000)
- The Wayans Bros. (1999-2002)
- 7th Heaven (2000–02; 2009–10)
- Andromeda (2000–05)
- Change of Heart (2000–03)
- Cleopatra 2525 (2000–01)
- Clueless (2000–02)
- Jack of All Trades (2000)
- Street Smarts (2000–05)
- Suddenly Susan (2000–03)
- Total Recall 2070 (2000)
- The 5th Wheel (2001–04)
- City Guys (2001–03)
- ElimiDate (2001–06)
- Mutant X (2001–05)
- Adventure Inc. (2002–03)
- Beyond with James van Praagh (2002–03)
- Celebrity Justice (2002–05)
- Cybill (2002–06)
- Happy Days (2002–04)
- Home Improvement (2002–07)
- Will & Grace (2002–05)
- The Addams Family (2003)
- Becker (2003–08)
- The Rockford Files (2003–07)
- The Sharon Osbourne Show (2003–04)
- America's Funniest Home Videos (Fuentes/Fugelsang and Bergeron runs only) (2004–18)
- Maximum Exposure (2004–07)
- The Twilight Zone (2002) (2004–06)
- Unexplained Mysteries (2004–05)
- 24 (2005–September 27, 2008)
- Farscape (2005–06)
- Moesha (2005–07)
- Sex and the City (2005–07)
- American Idol Rewind (2006–September 29, 2008)
- Da Vinci's Inquest (2005–September 29, 2008)
- Funniest Pets & People (2006–09)
- Homicide: Life on the Street (September 2006–September 2009)
- Even Stevens (September 18, 2006 – September 11, 2008)
- Lizzie McGuire (September 18, 2006 – September 12, 2008)
- Scrubs (September 18, 2006 – 2013)
- Chappelle's Show (2007–10)
- Corner Gas (2007–September 7, 2009)
- Nash Bridges (2007–10)
- Reno 911! (2007–10)
- The Steve Wilkos Show (2007–September 11, 2009)
- Toni On! (2007–10, produced by sister station WPIX in New York)
- 3rd Rock from the Sun (2008–10)
- ALF (2008–December 27, 2009)
- Around the World for Free (2008–09)
- Boston Legal (2008–10)
- Whacked Out Videos (2008–10)
- Hollywood & Dine (April 18, 2008–September 2010)
- Walker, Texas Ranger (2008—19)
- NewsRadio (October 4, 2008 – 2009)
- Legend of the Seeker (November 1, 2008–September 2010)
- The Bob and Tom Show (2009–10)
- Bones (2009–11, September 29, 2012 – 2016)
- Smash Cuts (2009–10)
- Star Trek: The Next Generation (2009–11)
- WWE Superstars (2009–11)
- American Gladiators (2008 version; June 25–September 21, 2009)
- Sister, Sister (September 11, 2007 – May 11, 2011)
- South Park (September 11, 2009 – September 9, 2012)
- Law & Order: Criminal Intent (September 28, 2009 – 2015)
- Dharma & Greg (2010–14)
- Mad About You (2010–11, 2014)
- Monk (2010–12)
- Curb Your Enthusiasm (September 13, 2010 – September 10, 2011)
- Entourage (September 13, 2010 – September 10, 2011)
- The New Adventures of Old Christine (September 13, 2010 – 2013)
- How I Met Your Mother (September 14, 2010 – 2021)
- The Unit (September 25, 2010 – September 8, 2012)
- Just Shoot Me! (September 26, 2010 – 2011)
- 'Til Death (September 12, 2011 – 2014)
- 30 Rock (2011–17)
- Futurama (September 19, 2011 – 2014)
- It's Always Sunny in Philadelphia (September 19, 2011 – September 14, 2014)
- Rules of Engagement (September 10, 2012 – 2018)
- Bloopers! (September 15, 2012 – 2013)
- The Bill Cunningham Show^{1} (September 17, 2012 – 2013)
- Parks and Recreation (September 9, 2013 – 2017)
- Law & Order (January 1, 2014 - September 2017)
- Blue Bloods (September 1, 2014 – 2024)
- Raising Hope (September 19, 2014 – 2018)
- Person of Interest (September 5, 2015 – 2021)
- Elementary (2015–20, September 2021 – September 2022)
- Cops (2016–2020)
- M*A*S*H (March 2, 2017 – 2021)
- Murder, She Wrote (2018–20)
- Last Man Standing (2018–2023)
- Ring Warriors (September 15 - December 22, 2018)
- Married... with Children (September 15, 2018 – 2021)
- JAG (July 4, 2019 – 2021)

=== Newscasts and local programming from WGN-TV ===
- Bozo's Circus (1978–1980)
- John Drury and Newsnine (simulcast of former 10 p.m. newscast; 1978 – September 1980)
- Nightbeat (simulcast of former late night newscast; 1978–1983)
- Ray Rayner and His Friends (1978–1981)
- The Bozo Show (1980–1994)
- WGN News at Nine (formerly The Nine O'Clock News; simulcast of 9 p.m. newscast; September 1980 – January 30, 2014)
- WGN Midday News (formerly Chicago's Midday News and WGN News at Noon; simulcast of noon-1 p.m. CT portion, 1983–2014)
- Heritage of Faith (1983–1992)
- Chicago's Very Own (1988–1992)
- $100,000 Fortune Hunt (1989–1994)
- People to People (1990–2014)
- U.S. Farm Report (1992–2007)
- WGN Weekend Morning News (Saturday edition, 1992–1998; Sunday edition, 1992–1994)
- The Bozo Super Sunday Show (1994–2001)
- Illinois Instant Riches/Illinois' Luckiest (1994–2000)
- WGN Morning News (simulcast of morning newscast; September 6, 1994 – 1997 and February 3 – December 12, 2014)
- Adelante, Chicago (1995–2014)

=== Original programming ===
- Cultivating Life (April 2006 – September 2010)
- The Bob & Tom Show (November 3, 2008 – September 10, 2010)
- Around the World for Free (2009–2010)
- WWE Superstars (April 16, 2009 – April 7, 2011)
- Sky Dives (2009)
- All In Zero Hour (2018)

=== Sports programming ===
WGN-TV Chicago, through its WGN Sports department, holds the broadcast rights to the following sports telecasts, which were discontinued from airing on WGN America as of December 15, 2014:

- Chicago Bulls NBA basketball games ^{1}
- Chicago Cubs Major League Baseball games ^{1}
- Chicago White Sox Major League Baseball games ^{1}

==== Short-form programming ====
- Earl Pitts Uhmerikun (April 2010 – November 2011)

=== Movie presentations ===
- Family Classics (Sunday afternoons 1962–2000)
- Creature Features (Saturday nights 1970–1976)
- WGN Presents (1987–2003)
- WGN Action Theater (Saturday late nights; 1993–2002)
- WGN Matinee Theater (weekend afternoons; 1993–2002)
- Way Back Wednesday (Wednesday evenings; 2007–2010)
- Movie Underground (Friday evenings; 2008–2010)

=== Annual specials ===
- Bozo, Gar and Ray: WGN TV Classics (each Thanksgiving, Christmas Eve and Christmas Day)
- Bud Billiken Parade (each August on the second Saturday of the month)
- Chicago St. Patrick's Day Parade
- Live from Daryl's House: A New Year's Eve Special (2010)
- McDonald's Thanksgiving Parade (each November)
- MDA Show of Strength (1978–2012; each Labor Day weekend)
- Mummers Parade (tape delay of New Year's Day parade)
- Tournament of Roses Parade (simulcast from sister station KTLA in Los Angeles; each New Year's Day, currently only on WGN-TV)
- Yule Log (each Christmas morning; also aired on most Tribune-owned stations, currently on WGN-TV but not on WGN America)

==== Religious programming ====
- Sunday Mass (1980–1992)
- Robert Schuller (1981–1992)
- Kenneth Copeland (1989–1990; 1992–2011)
- Oral Roberts (1990–2001)
- Believer's Voice of Victory (1992–1994; 2003–2009)
- In Touch with Dr. Charles Stanley (1992–1999)
- Jack Van Impe (1992–2007)
- The Key of David (1992–2017)
- Winning Walk (1992–2003)
- Life in the Word (1993–2004)
- Jimmy Swaggart (1996–2010)
- Fresh Fire with Dennis Burke (1997–1998)
- Jerry Savelle (1997–1998)
- Singsation ^{1} (1997–2018)
- Winning in Life (1997–1999)
- Tomorrow's World ^{1} (1998–2023)
- Changing Your World with Creflo Dollar (2001–2021)
- Enjoying Everyday Life with Joyce Meyer (2001–2017)
- Believer's Walk of Faith with Pastor Bill Winston ^{1} (2006–2008)
- Amazing Facts (2007–2014)
- Campmeeting
- Catholic Mass
- In Search of the Lord's Way
- The Jewish Jesus
- Joseph Prince
- Manna-fest with Perry Stone
- Michael Youssef
- Worship Anew

=== NewsNation programming ===
- Banfield (2021–2026)
- Dan Abrams Live (2021–2025)
- Early Morning (2022–2023)
- The Donlon Report (2020–2021)
