= Louise de Schweinitz Darrow =

American physician

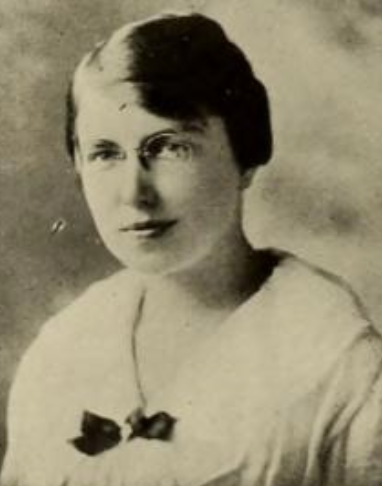
- Louise de Schweinitz, from the 1918 yearbook of Smith College
- Born: August 15, 1897; Nazareth, Pennsylvania, U.S.
- Died: April 3, 1987 (age 99); West Orange, New Jersey, U.S.
- Occupations: Physician, public health advocate
- Spouse: Daniel C. Darrow
- Father: Paul de Schweinitz
- Relatives: Dorothea de Schweinitz (sister); Lewis David de Schweinitz (great-grandfather)

Louise de Schweinitz Darrow (August 15, 1897 – April 3, 1997) was an American physician and birth control advocate.

== Early life and education ==
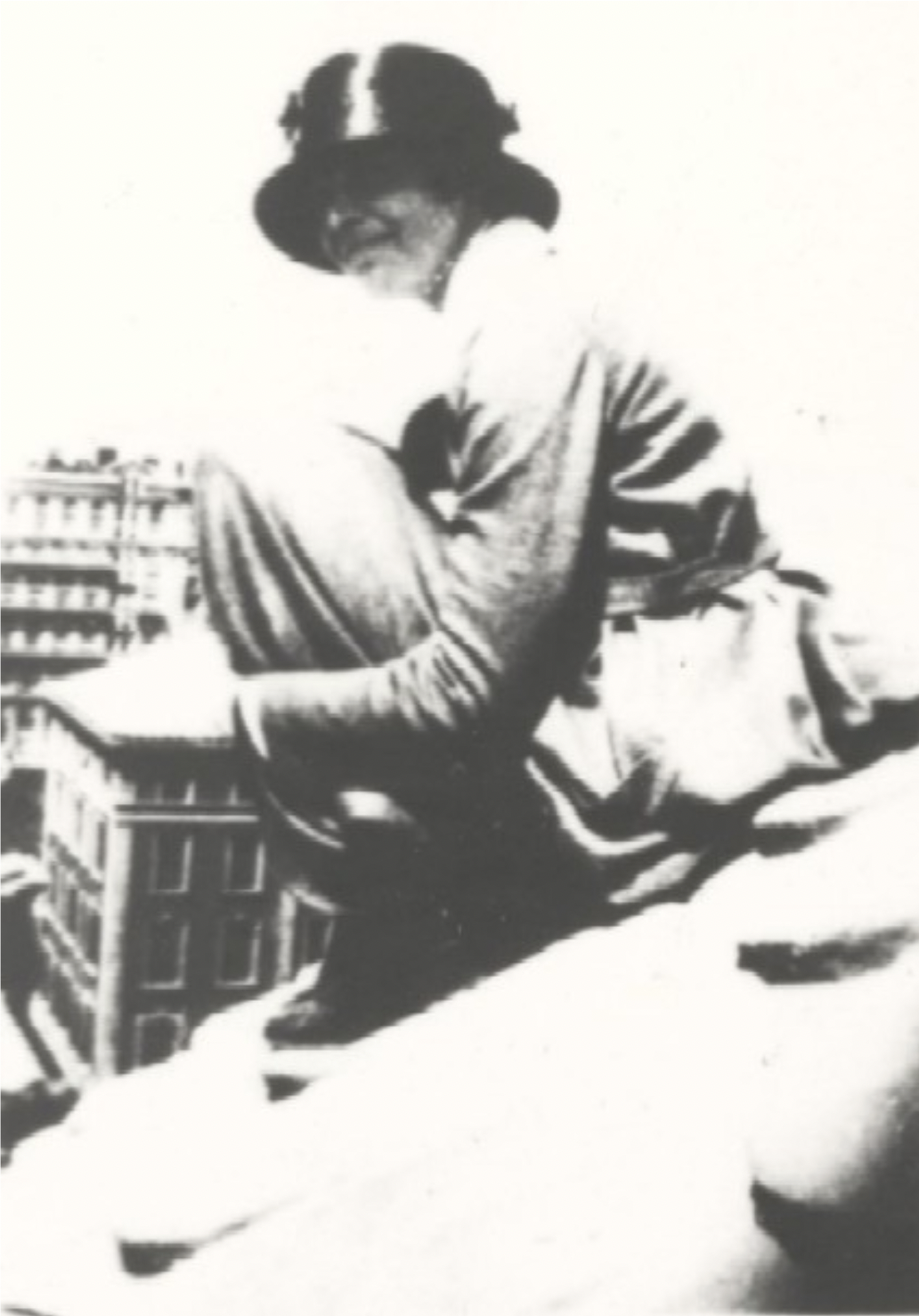
Louise de Schweinitz took this photograph of Amelia Earhart on the roof of a domed building at Columbia University in 1920.

De Schweinitz was born in Nazareth, Pennsylvania, the daughter of Paul de Schweinitz and Mary Catherine Daniel de Schweinitz. Her father was one of six bishops of the Moravian Church in the United States, and a descendant of Nicolaus Zinzendorf. Her grandfather Robert William de Schweinitz was a noted educator, and her great-grandfather was botanist Lewis David de Schweinitz. Her sister was social worker and federal labor official Dorothea de Schweinitz. She graduated from Smith College in 1918, attended Columbia University in 1919 and 1920, where she was a classmate and friend of Amelia Earhart, and earned her medical degree at Johns Hopkins School of Medicine in 1924.

== Career ==
Darrow completed a residency at the New England Hospital for Women and Children, and was a staff physician at Yale University. Darrow was a suffragist, a strong advocate of sex education, and worked at an illegal birth control clinic in New Haven, Connecticut in the 1930s. "I think every girl who has a chance to take the Pill and do what she wants should read a biography of Sanger and realize what it meant to get the laws changed," she said in a 1975 interview.

She and her husband moved to Kansas City in 1954, where they were both pediatric specialists. She was assistant director of the Children's Rehabilitation Unit at the University of Kansas Medical Center. She traveled in South American with the Pan American Medical Women's Alliance in 1975. She volunteered at the hospital well into her nineties, and was honored by the Exchange Club of Jackson County in 1988 for her volunteer work.

Darrow sometimes spoke to community groups about her friendship with Amelia Earhart. Earhart visited Darrow in Connecticut in 1936, shortly before Earhart's final flight.

== Publications ==
- "Delays in Diagnosis of Deafness Among Preschool Children" (1959, with C. Arden Miller and June B. Miller)
- "How Infants Three, Four, and Five Months of Age Respond to Sound" (1963, with June Miller and Cornelius P. Goetzinger)
- "Perinatal and Environmental Factors in Late Neurogenic Sequelae" (1966, with Eleni Bacola, Franklin C. Behrle, Herbert C. Miller, and Mary Mira)

== Personal life ==
De Schweinitz married fellow pediatrician Daniel Cady Darrow in 1923. They had five children. Her husband died in 1965. She died in 1997, at the age of 99, at a retirement community for women in West Orange, New Jersey. Her papers and those of her sister Dorothea are in the Sophia Smith Collection of Women's History at Smith College. There is a Louise de Schweinitz Darrow Award at the University of Kansas, "given to students who demonstrate scholastic achievement, leadership potential, and social consciousness."
