= Westinghouse Works, 1904 =

Westinghouse Works
- Cinematography: G. W. Bitzer
- Production company: American Mutoscope and Biograph Company
- Release date: 1904

Westinghouse Works

Westinghouse Works, 1904 is a collection of American short silent films, each averaging about three minutes in length. The films were taken from April 18, 1904, to May 16, 1904, in Pittsburgh, Pennsylvania, and document various Westinghouse manufacturing plants. They were made by G. W. "Billy" Bitzer of the American Mutoscope and Biograph Company, were shown at the Westinghouse Auditorium at the 1904 St. Louis World's Fair, and may have been made for that purpose. At least 29 films were produced and 21 remain in the collection which were selected for preservation in the National Film Registry by the Library of Congress in 1998.

== Collection ==
The films in the collection of the Library of Congress are:

1. Assembling a generator, Westinghouse works
2. Assembling and testing turbines, Westinghouse works
3. Casting a guide box, Westinghouse works
4. Coil winding machines, Westinghouse works
5. Coil winding section E, Westinghouse works
6. Girls taking time checks, Westinghouse works
7. Girls winding armatures
8. Panorama exterior Westinghouse works
9. Panorama of Machine Co. aisle, Westinghouse works
10. Panorama view street car motor room
11. Panoramic view aisle B, Westinghouse works
12. Steam hammer, Westinghouse works
13. Steam whistle, Westinghouse works
14. Taping coils, Westinghouse works
15. Tapping a furnace, Westinghouse works
16. Testing a rotary, Westinghouse works
17. Testing large turbines, Westinghouse works
18. Welding the big ring
19. Westinghouse Air Brake Co. Westinghouse Co. works (casting scene)
20. Westinghouse Air Brake Co. Westinghouse Co. works (moulding scene)
21. Westinghouse Air Brake Co. Westinghouse works

== Production ==
Westinghouse executives commissioned Biograph to produce these films, intending to exhibit them to their subsidiaries and employees, thus making them some of the earliest existing examples of what are now called industrial films. They cannot be called documentaries because they were paid for and made according to guidelines set by the manufacturing company. In addition, they cannot be called commercials because they do not advertise individual products and were not exhibited widely to elicit sales.

The films were the first to use mercury vapor lamps (conveniently made by Westinghouse) to illuminate its shots, and they were also the first to use crane shots. Bitzer primarily used stationary cameras and fixed lenses, and he typically shot the films in a single continuous take.

Most films did not have title cards, so many of their names were assigned by the Library of Congress.

== Release ==
The finished films were shown to Westinghouse employees in Pittsburgh, narrated by a speaker. They were later exhibited at the Louisiana Purchase Exposition in St. Louis (accompanied by organ music), and were received positively by audiences.

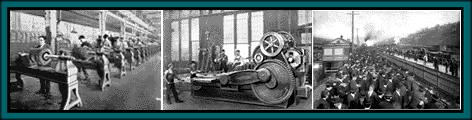
