= Nash Squared =

London-based international outsourcing company

- Type: Private company
- Traded as: LSE: HVN
- Industry: Professional services
- Founded: 1988; 38 years ago
- Headquarters: London, United Kingdom
- Area served: Global
- Key people: Bev White (Executive Chair)
- Products: IT Outsourcing, Professional Recruitment, Leadership Services,
- Number of employees: 2,500 (2020)
- Website: https://www.nashsquared.com

Nash Squared (formerly known as Harvey Nash Group) is a global digital services consultancy providing outsourced digital transformation development services as well as technology talent acquisition services. They were formerly listed on the London Stock Exchange but became a privately listed company in 2018 following a near total buyout by DBAY Advisors.

The company operates from over 40 offices in 16 countries, covering the United States, Europe and Asia. The organisation is made up of Harvey Nash, Crimson, Spinks and Talent-IT.

Harvey Nash, the firm's flagship talent acquisition subbrand, primarily recruits and staffs developers at client companies. Harvey Nash also provides executive search and talent management services. Harvey Nash is a major sponsor of CivTech Accelerator, a 15-week intense curriculum combining rapid product development and business courses. The winners will be accepted into the Scottish Government's CivTech Accelerator initiative, which seeks to resolve a range of problems faced by public sector entities, including national charities and local councils.
