= Inventionland =

Coordinates: 40.5017095°N 79.8705323°W

- Built: 2006
- Location: Pittsburgh, Pennsylvania, U.S.
- Industry: Design Facility, Tourist Attraction
- Employees: 250
- Address: 585 Alpha Drive Pittsburgh, PA 15238

Inventionland is a Pittsburgh-based immersive work environment and idea incubator.

Inventionland was conceived by George Davison. Nathan Field served as the executive creative coach, and Joey Warren acted as senior concept designer. According to George Davison, his intention in building Inventionland was to provide a creative work environment in which artists, graphic designers, industrial designers and others could design, develop and create prototypes.

== Conception and Themed Sets ==
Inventionland officially opened in 2006, having taken 18 months from design to construction. The interior renovation took one year and cost $5 million.

Within Inventionland's 61,000 square-foot design facility are 16 themed sets, named and designed to reflect the new-product invention activity within. Some of the sets include:

1. Motor Speeday: industrial and automotive products
2. Discover Pirate Ship: toy department
3. Crafty Cottage: sewing
4. Animation Attic:
5. Creativity Cabin
6. Nursery Noook: Baby products
7. Pet Shack: Animal products
8. Inventalot Castle
9. Creation Cavern: hunting, fishing, camping, and hiking
10. Brainpower Ballpark: sports
11. Treehouse
12. Inventron 54 Robot: consumer electronics
13. Home Sweet Home: household products
14. Home Health Innovations
15. Concept Kitchen (giant cupcake): kitchen
16. Animation Studio with one of the largest green screens in the tri-state area

Inventionland also has three running waterfalls, lifelike trees and butterflies and grass-lined sidewalks. Its manufacturing capabilities include metalworking, woodworking, molding, laser cutting, prototyping, circuit board construction and more, which all take place in its production facility.

== Honors and awards ==
The January/February 2008 issue of I.D. Magazine recognized Inventionland as one of "40 Amazing-Looking Design Offices". Inventionland was also featured in the 2008 Ripley's Believe It or Not Annual, "The Remarkable Revealed".

In 2011, Inventionland was the recipient of a Creative Rooms in Business Award, a regional Pittsburgh award given annually and sponsored by Pittsburgh Design, Art and Technology (DATA). In 2018, an article on Career Addict listed Inventionland as one of the top nine coolest offices in the world.

== Inventionland TV Special ==
On December 24, 2011, the History Channel aired Inventionland, a reality television special shot on location at Inventionland and starring George Davison. According to a company press release, Inventionland was produced for History by JWM Productions, and Jonathan Wyche served as the producer. Patrice Shannon edited the show, and the online editor was Brian Newell.

The Inventionland TV debut featured three inventors, Milton Branch, Curt Whiteside and Jason Ramsey, who each developed a prototype for a new consumer product. The one-hour reality show explored whether the inventors' product designs would function in a usable manner and/or be suitable for licensing and merchandising. In the show, George Davison and five of his employees tested various designs of each of the three inventions in a variety of settings, including a NASCAR auto shop. Five Inventionland designers and builders were featured in the show (Jason Rogge, Jarrod Campbell, Clay Carlino, Lucky Swartz, and Curtis Wierman).
