= Neil Hilborn =

American slam poet (born 1990)

- Born: August 8, 1989 (age 37); Houston, Texas
- Education: B.A., creative writing, Macalester College
- Occupation: Slam poet
- Writing career
- Language: English
- Genre: Slam poetry
- Notable work: "OCD"

Neil Hilborn (born August 8, 1990) is an American slam poet who writes and performs poetry. His poems often detail personal experiences and battles with mental illness. He is best known for his poem "OCD", which has received 75 million views online. Hilborn tours to perform his poetry at colleges and other venues.

== Early life ==
Hilborn was born in Houston, Texas, and became interested in creative writing at an early age, writing his first poem when he was eight years old. As a child, he was diagnosed with obsessive–compulsive disorder (OCD), and he was diagnosed with bipolar disorder while in college. Though he did not originally use poetry as a coping mechanism, when he was a teenager his work shifted toward helping him deal with his disorders.

Shortly after graduating high school, Hilborn decided to leave Houston for Saint Paul, Minnesota, where he attended Macalester College. During his sophomore year he began writing spoken word. He joined their slam poetry team and in 2011, the team placed first at the College National Poetry Slam. Hilborn graduated with honors and a degree in Creative Writing, intending to pursue his Master of Fine Arts and become a professor. For a little over a year he co-coached the slam poetry team at Macalester, running various poetry workshops and going on a few tours in the Midwest.

== Performance ==
Hilborn began writing slam poetry and competing/performing in 2009. He was a part of his college's slam poetry team as well as the Minneapolis Adult National Slam Poetry team, which placed 5th out of 80 competitors in the 2011 national competition. After graduating, Hilborn began to perform with Button Poetry, a company based out of Minnesota. In 2012, he travelled the Midwest on The Good News Poetry Tour with fellow Button poets Dylan Garrity and Hieu Nguyen. The tour visited college campuses and small venues, revamping in 2013 to tour in the Northeast.

Later in 2013, a video of Hilborn's poem "OCD" went viral, garnering millions of views across social media platforms. Although the performance of "OCD" was among the first videos posted on Button Poetry's YouTube page in 2012, the poem did not gain popularity until another performance was posted a year later. As of 2017, the video garnered more than 62 million views and is both Button Poetry's most watched video and the most watched slam poem on the internet. Because of the poem's success, in 2014 Hilborn signed with the College Agency, a company that represents performers in all genres who want to perform on college campuses. Hilborn was then able to begin supporting himself with his poetry.

== Publications ==
Hilborn's first chapbook, Clatter, was self-published in 2012 before being picked up by Button Poetry and re-published in 2013.

Hilborn's second book, Our Numbered Days, was released on May 14, 2015. The book is a collection of 45 poems. The book is divided into six different sections spanning the entire collection. Our Numbered Days features some of Hilborn's most well-known poetry, including "Joey" and "OCD". Arianna Miller is cited in her critical review as stating, "Hilborn wants readers to question his work, to use his pieces as a means of learning not only about oneself, but also about the world around him/her/them". The book is an Amazon bestseller with more than 50,000 copies in print.

== Influences ==
In an interview with The Triangle, Hilborn cites Paul Guest, Sherman Alexie, and poets Patricia Smith and Michael Mlekoday as influencing his work. Mlekoday had a particularly strong influence as Hilborn's teacher, and is someone Hilborn says taught him "how to construct an image and how to speak precisely".

Much of Hilborn's work is autobiographical, frequently referencing people and events from his own life. His work often references the topic of living with mental illness, and how his diagnoses of OCD and bipolar disorder have impacted him.

Hilborn's work has inspired readers to create their own versions, videos, and interpretations of his poetry, particularly of his poem "OCD". This includes OCD Love, a dance performance to Techno music.

== Selected works ==
- Clatter (Button Poetry, 2012)
- Our Numbered Days (Button Poetry, 2015) ISBN 9780989641562I
- The Future (Button Poetry, 2018) ISBN 978-1-943735-31-0
- About Time (Button Poetry, 2024)
