= Daniel C. Darrow =

American pediatrician and clinical biochemist (1895–1965)

Daniel Cody Darrow (1895 – June 20, 1965) was an American pediatrician and clinical biochemist whose research focused on fluid and electrolyte balance in the human body. He pioneered the routine use of intravenous potassium in patients after surgery, and in children with diarrhea.

== Life and career ==
Darrow was born in 1895 in Fargo, North Dakota; his father was a general surgeon and his mother was a suffragist. After transferring from the North Dakota State Agricultural College, he graduated from Cornell University in 1916 and received an M.D. from Johns Hopkins University in 1920. As a medical student, he developed tuberculosis and spent time at a sanitorium in Saranac Lake, New York. After graduating, he became an assistant and then an instructor in the Johns Hopkins School of Medicine pathology department, where he met his wife, Louise de Schweinitz, who was a medical student at the time.

Darrow became a pediatric intern at Yale University Medical Center in 1922 and commenced his pediatric residency at Boston City Hospital in 1923. He moved to St. Louis in 1925 as an instructor in pediatrics at the School of Medicine at Washington University in St. Louis, where he began to study the blood volume and plasma concentration of children and infants who were healthy compared to those who were unwell with dehydration or fever. In 1928, he returned to Yale, where he continued his research into the intracellular and extracellular fluid compartments. He also developed an interest in the role of potassium in the human body, and particularly its role in metabolic alkalosis. His findings led to the routine administration of intravenous potassium to postoperative patients to prevent ileus, and in the treatment of children with diarrheal illness.

Darrow received the John Howland Award in 1959. He moved to Wilmington, North Carolina, in 1962 as the director of research at the Babies Hospital and an adjunct professor of pediatrics at Duke University. He died on June 20, 1965, while racing his boat. In a textbook dedication, the pediatrician Donald B. Cheek described Darrow as "a teacher of teachers". In an obituary published in The Journal of Pediatrics, Robert E. Cooke noted of Darrow that although he was passionate about the education of pediatricians, "He was tolerant of students, but they were rather terrified of him."
