= Empathy =

Ability to understand or feel what another is feeling

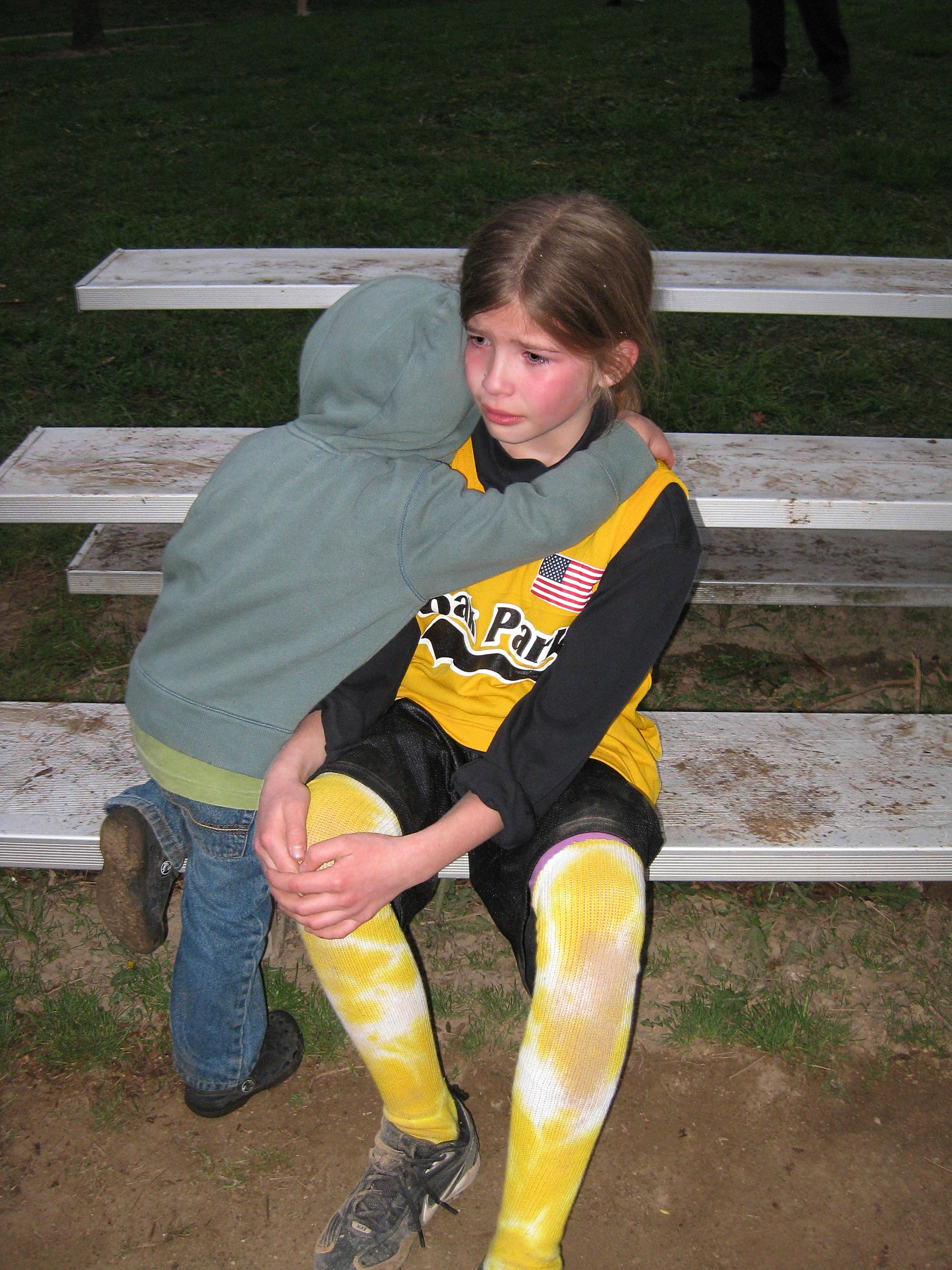
Hugging is a common display of empathy.

Empathy is generally described as the ability to perceive another person's perspective, to understand, feel, and possibly share and respond to their experience. However, there are other (sometimes conflicting) definitions of empathy that include but are not limited to social, cognitive, and emotional processes primarily concerned with understanding others. Empathy is often considered to be a broad term, and can be divided into more specific concepts and categories, such as cognitive empathy, emotional (or affective) empathy, somatic empathy, and spiritual empathy.

Major areas of research include the development of empathy, the genetics and neuroscience of empathy, cross-species empathy, and the impairment of empathy. Some researchers have attempted to quantify empathy through different methods, such as questionnaires that participants can fill out and then be scored on their answers.

The ability to imagine oneself as another person is a sophisticated process. However, the basic capacity to recognize emotions in others may be innate and may be achieved unconsciously. Empathy exists on a spectrum, an individual can be more or less empathetic toward another individual and empirical research supports a variety of interventions that are able to improve empathy.

== Etymology ==
The English word empathy is derived from the Ancient Greek ἐμπάθεια (empatheia, meaning "physical affection or passion"). That word derives from ἐν (en, "in, at") and πάθος (pathos, "passion" or "suffering"). (Note: In modern Greek, εμπάθεια can mean prejudice, malevolence, malice, or hatred, depending on the context.)

The German philosopher Theodor Lipps adapted the German aesthetic term Einfühlung ("feeling into") to psychology in 1903. The English psychologist Edward B. Titchener subsequently translated Einfühlung into English as "empathy", in 1909.

== Definitions ==
Since its introduction into the English language, empathy has had a wide range of (sometimes conflicting) definitions among both researchers and laypeople. Empathy definitions encompass a broad range of phenomena, including caring for other people and having a desire to help them, experiencing emotions that match another person's, discerning what another person is thinking or feeling, and making less distinct the differences between the self and the other.

Since empathy involves understanding the emotional states of other people, the way it is characterized derives from the way emotions are characterized. For example, if emotions are characterized by bodily feelings, then understanding the bodily feelings of another will be considered central to empathy. On the other hand, if emotions are characterized by a combination of beliefs and desires, then understanding those beliefs and desires will be more essential to empathy.

Paradigmatically, a person exhibits empathy when they communicate an accurate recognition of the significance of another person's ongoing intentional actions, associated emotional states, and personal characteristics in a manner that seems accurate and tolerable to the recognized person. This is a nuanced perspective on empathy which assists in the understanding of complex human emotions and interactions. Acknowledging subjective experiences highlights the need for balance and understanding when engaging in empathy.

One's ability to recognize the bodily feelings or emotions of another is related to one's imitative capacities, and seems to be grounded in an innate capacity to associate the bodily movements and facial expressions one sees in another with the proprioceptive feelings of producing those corresponding movements or expressions oneself.

=== Distinctions between empathy and related concepts ===
Compassion and sympathy are terms associated with empathy. A person feels compassion when they notice others are in need, and this feeling motivates that person to help. Like empathy, compassion has a wide range of definitions and purported facets (which overlap with some definitions of empathy). Sympathy is a feeling of care and understanding for someone in need. Some include in sympathy an empathic concern for another person, and the wish to see them better off or happier.

Empathy is also related to pity and emotional contagion. One feels pity towards others who might be in trouble or in need of help. This feeling is described as "feeling sorry" for someone. Emotional contagion is when a person (especially an infant or a member of a mob) imitatively "catches" the emotions that others are showing without necessarily recognizing this is happening.

Alexithymia describes a deficiency in understanding, processing, or describing one's own emotions (unlike empathy which is about someone else's emotions).

== Classification ==
Empathy has two major components:

1. Affective empathy, also called emotional empathy, is the ability to respond with an appropriate emotion to another's mental states. Our ability to empathize emotionally is based on emotional contagion: being affected by another's emotional or arousal state. Affective empathy can be subdivided into the following scales:
  - Empathic concern: sympathy and compassion for others in response to their suffering.
  - Personal distress: feelings of discomfort and anxiety in response to another's suffering. There is no consensus regarding whether personal distress is a form of empathy or instead is something distinct from empathy. There may be a developmental aspect to this subdivision. Infants respond to the distress of others by getting distressed themselves; only when they are two years old do they start to respond in other-oriented ways: trying to help, comfort, and share.
  - Affective mentalizing: uses clues like body language, facial expressions, knowledge about the other's beliefs & situation, and context to understand more about what one is empathizing with.
2. Cognitive empathy is the ability to understand another's perspective or mental state. The terms empathic accuracy, social cognition, perspective-taking, theory of mind, and mentalizing are often used synonymously, but due to a lack of studies comparing theory of mind with types of empathy, it is unclear whether these are equivalent. Although measures of cognitive empathy include self-report questionnaires and behavioral measures, a 2019 meta-analysis found only a negligible association between self-report and behavioral measures, suggesting that people are generally not able to accurately assess their own cognitive empathy abilities. Cognitive empathy can be subdivided into the following scales:
  - Perspective-taking: the tendency to spontaneously adopt others' psychological perspectives.
  - Fantasy: the tendency to identify with fictional characters.
  - Tactical (or strategic) empathy: the deliberate use of perspective-taking to achieve certain desired ends.
  - Emotion regulation: a damper on the emotional contagion process that allows you to empathize without being overwhelmed by the emotion you are empathizing with.

The scientific community has not coalesced around a precise definition of these constructs, but there is consensus about this distinction. Affective and cognitive empathy are also independent from one another; someone who strongly empathizes emotionally may not necessarily be good in understanding another's perspective.

Additional constructs that have been proposed include behavioral empathy (which governs how one chooses to respond to feelings of empathy), social empathy (in which the empathetic person integrates their understanding of broader social dynamics into their empathetic modeling), and ecological empathy (which encompasses empathy directed towards the natural world).

In addition, Fritz Breithaupt emphasizes the importance of empathy suppression mechanisms in healthy empathy.

=== Empathic anger ===
Empathic anger is an emotion, a form of empathic distress. Empathic anger is felt in a situation where someone else is being hurt by another person or thing.

Empathic anger affects desires to help and to punish. Two sub-categories of empathic anger are state empathic anger (current empathic anger) and trait empathic anger (tendency or predisposition to experience empathic anger).

The higher a person's perspective-taking ability, the less angry they are in response to a provocation. Empathic concern does not, however, significantly predict anger response, and higher personal distress is associated with increased anger.

=== Empathic distress ===
Empathic distress is feeling the perceived pain of another person. This feeling can be transformed into empathic anger, feelings of injustice, or guilt. These emotions can be perceived as pro-social; however, views differ as to whether they serve as motives for moral behavior.

== Measurement ==
Efforts to measure empathy go back to at least the mid-twentieth century. Researchers approach the measurement of empathy from a number of perspectives.

Behavioral measures normally involve raters assessing the presence or absence of certain behaviors in the subjects they are monitoring. Both verbal and non-verbal behaviors have been captured on video by experimenters. Other experimenters required subjects to comment upon their own feelings and behaviors, or those of other people involved in the experiment, as indirect ways of signaling their level of empathic functioning to the raters.

Physiological responses tend to be captured by elaborate electronic equipment that has been physically connected to the subject's body. Researchers then draw inferences about that person's empathic reactions from the electronic readings produced.

Bodily or "somatic" measures can be seen as behavioral measures at a micro level. They measure empathy through facial and other non-verbally expressed reactions. Such changes are presumably underpinned by physiological changes brought about by some form of "emotional contagion" or mirroring. These reactions, while they appear to reflect the internal emotional state of the empathizer, could also, if the stimulus incident lasted more than the briefest period, reflect the results of emotional reactions based on cognitions associated with role-taking ("if I were him I would feel...").

Picture or puppet-story indices for empathy have been adopted to enable even very young, pre-school subjects to respond without needing to read questions and write answers. Dependent variables (variables that are monitored for any change by the experimenter) for younger subjects have included self reporting on a seven-point smiley face scale and filmed facial reactions.

In some experiments, subjects are required to watch video scenarios (either staged or authentic) and to make written responses which are then assessed for their levels of empathy; scenarios are sometimes also depicted in printed form.

=== Self-report measures ===
Measures of empathy also frequently require subjects to self-report upon their own ability or capacity for empathy, using Likert-style numerical responses to a printed questionnaire that may have been designed to reveal the affective, cognitive-affective, or largely cognitive substrates of empathic functioning. Some questionnaires claim to reveal both cognitive and affective substrates. However, a 2019 meta analysis questions the validity of self-report measures of cognitive empathy, finding that such self-report measures have negligibly small correlations with corresponding behavioral measures. Balancing subjective self-perceptions along with observable behaviors can help to contribute to a more reliable assessment of empathy.

Such measures are also vulnerable to measuring not empathy but the difference between a person's felt empathy and their standards for how much empathy is appropriate. For example, one researcher found that students scored themselves as less empathetic after taking her empathy class. After learning more about empathy, the students became more exacting in how they judged their own feelings and behavior, expected more from themselves, and so rated themselves more severely.

In the field of medicine, a measurement tool for carers is the Jefferson Scale of Physician Empathy, Health Professional Version (JSPE-HP).

The Interpersonal Reactivity Index (IRI) is among the oldest published measurement tools still in frequent use (first published in 1983) that provides a multi-dimensional assessment of empathy. It comprises a self-report questionnaire of 28 items, divided into four seven-item scales covering the subdivisions of affective and cognitive empathy described above. More recent self-report tools include The Empathy Quotient (EQ) created by Baron-Cohen and Wheelwright which comprises a self-report questionnaire consisting of 60 items. Another multi-dimensional scale is the Questionnaire of Cognitive and Affective Empathy (QCAE, first published in 2011).

The Empathic Experience Scale is a 30-item questionnaire that measures empathy from a phenomenological perspective on intersubjectivity, which provides a common basis for the perceptual experience (vicarious experience dimension) and a basic cognitive awareness (intuitive understanding dimension) of others' emotional states.

It is difficult to make comparisons over time using such questionnaires because of how language changes. For example, one study used a single questionnaire to measure 13,737 college students between 1979 and 2009, and found that empathy scores fell substantially over that time. A critic noted these results could be because the wording of the questionnaire had become anachronistically quaint (it used idioms no longer in common use, like "tender feelings", "ill at ease", "quite touched", or "go to pieces" that today's students might not identify with).

== Development ==
=== Ontogenetic development ===
By the age of two, children normally begin to exhibit fundamental behaviors of empathy by having an emotional response that corresponds with another person's emotional state. Even earlier, at one year of age, infants have some rudiments of empathy; they understand that, as with their own actions, other people's actions have goals. Toddlers sometimes comfort others or show concern for them. During their second year, they play games of falsehood or pretend in an effort to fool others. Such actions require that the child knows what others believe in order that the child can manipulate those beliefs.

According to researchers at the University of Chicago who used functional magnetic resonance imaging (fMRI), children between the ages of seven and twelve, when seeing others being injured, experience brain activity similar that which would occur if the child themself had been injured. Their findings are consistent with previous fMRI studies of pain empathy with adults, and previous findings that vicarious experiencing, particularly of others' distress, is hardwired and present early in life. The research found additional areas of the brain, associated with social and moral cognition, were activated when young people saw another person intentionally hurt by somebody, including regions involved in moral reasoning.

Although children are capable of showing some signs of empathy, including attempting to comfort a crying baby, from as early as 18 months to two years, most do not demonstrate a full theory of mind until around the age of four. Theory of mind involves the ability to understand that other people may have beliefs that are different from one's own, and is thought to involve the cognitive component of empathy. Children usually can pass false-belief tasks (a test for a theory of mind) around the age of four. It is theorised that people with autism find using a theory of mind to be very difficult, but there is quite a bit of controversy on this subject. (e.g. the Sally–Anne test).

Empathic maturity is a cognitive-structural theory developed at the Yale University School of Nursing. It addresses how adults conceive or understand the personhood of patients. The theory, first applied to nurses and since applied to other professions, postulates three levels of cognitive structures. The third and highest level is a meta-ethical theory of the moral structure of care. Adults who operate with level-III understanding synthesize systems of justice and care-based ethics.

=== Individual differences ===
The Empathic Concern scale assesses other-oriented feelings of sympathy and concern and the Personal Distress scale measures self-oriented feelings of personal anxiety and unease. Researchers have used behavioral and neuroimaging data to analyze extraversion and agreeableness. Both are associated with empathic accuracy and increased brain activity in two brain regions that are important for empathic processing (medial prefrontal cortex and temporoparietal junction).

=== Sex differences ===
On average, females score higher than males on measures of empathy, such as the Empathy Quotient (EQ), while males tend to score higher on the Systemizing Quotient (SQ). Both males and females with autistic spectrum disorders usually score lower on the EQ and higher on SQ (see below for more detail on autism and empathy).

Other studies show no significant sex differences, and instead suggest that gender differences are the result of motivational differences, such as upholding stereotypes. Gender stereotypes about men and women can affect how they express emotions. The sex difference is small to moderate, somewhat inconsistent, and is often influenced by the person's motivations or social environment. Bosson et al. say "physiological measures of emotion and studies that track people in their daily lives find no consistent sex differences in the experience of emotion", which "suggests that women may amplify certain emotional expressions, or men may suppress them".

However, a 2014 review from Neuroscience & Biobehavioral Reviews reported that there is evidence that "sex differences in empathy have phylogenetic and ontogenetic roots in biology and are not merely cultural byproducts driven by socialization." The review found sex differences in empathy from birth, growing larger with age, and consistent and stable across lifespan. Females, on average, had higher empathy than males, while children with higher empathy, regardless of gender, continue to be higher in empathy throughout development.

Analysis of brain event-related potentials (ERP) found that females who saw human suffering tended to have higher ERP waveforms than males. An investigation of N400 amplitudes found, on average, higher N400 in females in response to social situations, which positively correlated with self-reported empathy. Structural fMRI studies also found females to have larger grey matter volumes in posterior inferior frontal and anterior inferior parietal cortex areas which are correlated with mirror neurons in fMRI literature.

Females also tended to have a stronger link between emotional and cognitive empathy. The researchers believe that the stability of these sex differences in development is unlikely to be explained by environmental influences, but rather by human evolution and inheritance. Throughout prehistory, women were the primary nurturers and caretakers of children; this might have resulted in a neurological adaptation for women to be more aware and responsive to non-verbal expression. According to the "Primary Caretaker Hypothesis", prehistoric men did not have such selective pressure as primary caretakers, which might explain modern day sex differences in emotion recognition and empathy.

A review published in Neuropsychologia found that females tended to be better at recognizing facial affects, expression processing, and emotions in general. Males tended to be better at recognizing specific behaviors such as anger, aggression, and threatening cues. A 2014 meta-analysis, in Cognition and Emotion, found a small female advantage in non-verbal emotional recognition.

=== Environmental influences ===
Some research theorizes that environmental factors, such as parenting style and relationships, affect the development of empathy in children. Empathy promotes pro-social relationships and helps mediate aggression.

Caroline Tisot studied how environmental factors like parenting style, parent empathy, and prior social experiences affect the development of empathy in young children. The children studied were asked to complete an effective empathy measure, while the children's parents completed a questionnaire to assess parenting style and the Balanced Emotional Empathy scale. The study found that certain parenting practices, as opposed to parenting style as a whole, contributed to the development of empathy in children. These practices include encouraging the child to imagine the perspectives of others and teaching the child to reflect on his or her own feelings. The development of empathy varied based on the gender of the child and parent. Paternal warmth was significantly positively related to empathy in children, especially boys. Maternal warmth was negatively related to empathy in children, especially girls.

Empathy may be disrupted due to brain trauma such as stroke. In most cases, empathy is impaired if a lesion or stroke occurs on the right side of the brain. Damage to the frontal lobe, which is primarily responsible for emotional regulation, can profoundly impact a person's capacity to experience empathy. People with an acquired brain injury also show lower levels of empathy. More than half of those people with a traumatic brain injury self-report a deficit in their empathic capacity.

There is some evidence that empathy is a skill that one can improve in with training.

== Biological basis ==
=== Genetics ===
Measures of empathy show evidence of being genetically influenced. For example, carriers of the deletion variant of ADRA2B show more activation of the amygdala when viewing emotionally arousing images. The gene 5-HTTLPR seems to influence sensitivity to negative emotional information and is also attenuated by the deletion variant of ADRA2b. Carriers of the double G variant of the OXTR gene have better social skills and higher self-esteem. A gene located near LRRN1 on chromosome 3 influences the human ability to read, understand, and respond to emotions in others.

=== Neurological basis of empathy ===
Contemporary neuroscience offers insights into the neurological basis of the human ability to understand and process emotion. Studies of mirror neurons attempt to measure the neural basis for human emotion-sharing capacity, and thereby to explain the basis of the empathy response. People who score high on empathy tests have especially busy mirror neuron systems. Empathy is a spontaneous sharing of affect, provoked by witnessing and sympathizing with another's emotional state. The empathic person mirrors or mimics the emotional response they would expect to feel if they were in the other person's place. Unlike personal distress, empathy is not characterized by aversion to another's emotional response. This distinction is vital because empathy is associated with the moral emotion sympathy, or empathic concern, and consequently also prosocial or altruistic action.

Meta-analysis of fMRI studies of empathy confirms that different brain areas are activated during affective-perceptual empathy than during cognitive-evaluative empathy. Affective empathy is correlated with increased activity in the insula while cognitive empathy is correlated with activity in the mid cingulate cortex and adjacent dorsomedial prefrontal cortex. A study with patients who experienced different types of brain damage confirmed the distinction between emotional and cognitive empathy. Specifically, the inferior frontal gyrus appears to be responsible for emotional empathy, and the ventromedial prefrontal gyrus seems to mediate cognitive empathy.

fMRI has been employed to investigate the functional anatomy of empathy. Observing another person's emotional state activates parts of the neuronal network that are involved in processing that same state in oneself, whether it is disgust, touch, or pain. Because empathy depends on the specific emotion being shared, there is no single dedicated "empathy area"; the recruited circuitry varies with the type of emotion observed, having been demonstrated for disgust, taste, and touch in addition to pain.As these emotional states are being observed, the brain is able activate a network of the brain that is involved in empathy. There are two separate systems of the brain involved with the feeling of empathy: a cognitive system and an emotional system. The cognitive system helps an individual understand another's perspective while the emotional system enables our ability to empathize emotionally. The neuronal network that is activated controls the observers response to these emotional states thus prompting an empathetic response.

The study of the neural underpinnings of empathy received increased interest following a paper published by S.D. Preston and Frans de Waal after the discovery of mirror neurons in monkeys that fire both when the creature watches another perform an action and when they themselves perform it. Researchers suggest that paying attention to perceiving another individual's state activates neural representations, and that this activation primes or generates the associated autonomic and somatic responses (perception-action coupling), unless inhibited. This mechanism resembles the common coding theory between perception and action.

Another study provides evidence of separate neural pathways activating reciprocal suppression in different regions of the brain associated with the performance of "social" and "mechanical" tasks. These findings suggest that the cognition associated with reasoning about the "state of another person's mind" and "causal/mechanical properties of inanimate objects" are neurally suppressed from occurring at the same time.

Mirroring-behavior in motor neurons during empathy may help duplicate feelings. Such sympathetic action may afford access to sympathetic feelings and, perhaps, trigger emotions of kindness and forgiveness.

=== Evolution across species ===
Studies in animal behavior and neuroscience indicate that empathy is not restricted to humans (however the interpretation of such research depends in part on how expansive a definition of empathy researchers adopt). Empathy-like behaviors have been observed in primates, both in captivity and in the wild, and in particular in bonobos, perhaps the most empathic non-human primate.

One study demonstrated prosocial behavior elicited by empathy in rodents. Rodents demonstrate empathy for cagemates (but not strangers) in pain.

An influential study on the evolution of empathy by Stephanie Preston and Frans de Waal discusses a neural perception-action mechanism and postulates a bottom-up model of empathy that ties together all levels, from state matching to perspective-taking.

University of Chicago neurobiologist Jean Decety agrees that empathy is not exclusive to humans, but that empathy has deep evolutionary, biochemical, and neurological underpinnings, and that even the most advanced forms of empathy in humans are built on more basic forms and remain connected to core mechanisms associated with affective communication, social attachment, and parental care. Neural circuits involved in empathy and caring include the brainstem, the amygdala, hypothalamus, basal ganglia, insula, and orbitofrontal cortex.

Researchers Zanna Clay and Frans de Waal studied the socio-emotional development of the bonobo chimpanzee. They focused on the interplay of numerous skills such as empathy-related responding, and how different rearing backgrounds of the juvenile bonobo affected their response to stressful events—events related to themselves (e.g. loss of a fight) as well as stressful events of others. They found that bonobos sought out body contact with one another as a coping mechanism. Bonobos sought out more body contact after watching an event distress other bonobos than after their individually experienced stressful event. Mother-reared bonobos sought out more physical contact than orphaned bonobos after a stressful event happened to another. This finding shows the importance of mother-child attachment and bonding in successful socio-emotional development, such as empathic-like behaviors. De Waal suggests the advantages provided to mothers who understand the needs of their children are the reason empathy evolved in the first place.

Empathic-like behavior has been observed in chimpanzees in different aspects of their natural behaviors. For example, chimpanzees spontaneously contribute comforting behaviors to victims of aggressive behavior in both natural and unnatural settings, a behavior recognized as consolation. Researchers led by Teresa Romero observed these empathic and sympathetic-like behaviors in chimpanzees in two separate outdoor housed groups. Acts of consolation were observed in both groups. This behavior is also found in humans, particularly in human infants. Another similarity found between chimpanzees and humans is that empathic-like responding was disproportionately provided to kin. Although comforting towards non-family chimpanzees was also observed, as with humans, chimpanzees showed the majority of comfort and concern to close/loved ones. Another similarity between chimpanzee and human expression of empathy is that females provided more comfort than males on average. The only exception to this discovery was that high-ranking males showed as much empathy-like behavior as their female counterparts. This is believed to be because of policing-like behavior and the authoritative status of high-ranking male chimpanzees.

Dogs have been hypothesized to share empathic-like responding towards humans. Researchers Custance and Mayer put individual dogs in an enclosure with their owner and a stranger. When the participants were talking or humming, the dog showed no behavioral changes; however when the participants were pretending to cry, the dogs oriented their behavior toward the person in distress whether it be the owner or stranger. The dogs approached the participants when crying in a submissive fashion, by sniffing, licking, and nuzzling the distressed person. The dogs did not approach the participants in the usual form of excitement, tail wagging, or panting. Since the dogs did not direct their empathic-like responses only towards their owner, it is hypothesized that dogs generally seek out humans showing distressing body behavior. Although this could suggest that dogs have the cognitive capacity for empathy, it could also mean that domesticated dogs have learned to comfort distressed humans through generations of being rewarded for that specific behavior.

When witnessing chicks in distress, domesticated hens (Gallus gallus domesticus) show emotional and physiological responding. Researchers found that in conditions where the chick was susceptible to danger, the mother hen's heart rate increased, she sounded vocal alarms, she decreased her personal preening, and her body temperature increased. This responding happened whether or not the chick felt as if it were in danger. Mother hens experienced stress-induced hyperthermia only when the chick's behavior correlated with the perceived threat.

Humans can empathize with other species. One study of a sample of organisms showed that the strength of human empathic perceptions (and compassionate reactions) toward an organism is negatively correlated with how long ago our species' had a common ancestor. In other words, the more phylogenetically close a species is to us, the more likely we are to feel empathy and compassion towards it.

=== Evolution of cooperation ===
Empathic perspective-taking plays important roles in sustaining cooperation in human societies, as studied by evolutionary game theory. In game theoretical models, indirect reciprocity refers to the mechanism of cooperation based on moral reputations that are assigned to individuals based on their perceived adherence a set of moral rules called social norms. It has been shown that if reputations are relative and individuals disagree on the moral standing of others (for example, because they use different moral evaluation rules or make errors of judgement), then cooperation will not be sustained. However, when individuals have the capacity for empathic perspective-taking, altruistic behavior can once again evolve. Moreover, evolutionary models also revealed that empathic perspective-taking itself can evolve, promoting prosocial behavior in human populations.

== Impairment ==
A difference in distribution between affective and cognitive empathy has been observed in various conditions. Psychopathy and narcissism are associated with impairments in affective but not cognitive empathy, whereas bipolar disorder is associated with deficits in cognitive but not affective empathy. People with borderline personality disorder (BPD) may suffer from impairments in cognitive empathy as well as fluctuating affective empathy, although this topic is controversial. Schizophrenia, too, is associated with deficits in both types of empathy. However, even in people without conditions such as these, the balance between affective and cognitive empathy varies.

Atypical empathic responses are associated with some personality disorders such as psychopathy, borderline, narcissistic, and schizoid personality disorders; conduct disorder; schizophrenia; bipolar disorder; and depersonalization. Sex offenders who had been raised in an environment where they were shown a lack of empathy and had endured abuse of the sort they later committed, felt less affective empathy for their victims.

An empathy gap is a reduction in empathy where it might otherwise be expected to occur.

=== Autism and controversy ===
The subject of whether autism affects empathy is a controversial and complex area of study. Several different factors are proposed to be at play, such as mirror neurons, alexithymia, and more. The double empathy problem theory proposes that prior studies on autism and empathy may have been misinterpreted and that autistic people show the same levels of empathy towards one another as non-autistic people do.

Autism spectrum disorder (ASD) is often correlated to problems with empathy and social communication skills. However, like ASD itself, these issues are often found to be on a spectrum. The suggestion that people with autism are likely to have issues with personal relationships and empathy is a complex issue that has been addressed in many studies. Various research has been exploring these concepts for more than twenty years.

Certain studies, like this one from 2004 found connections between ASD and empathy issues. Another study found that empathy problems may be associated to the comorbidity of alexithymia (a struggle to feel emotions) and ASD. However, a more recent study from 2022 found that there were, in fact, no significant differences between the brain sections (medial prefrontal cortex and amygdala) that are associated with empathy.

Another study (2023) focusing on ASD and empathy with regards to mirror neurons also reflected on the theory that mirror neurons "may be dysfunctional in ASD." However, as the researchers state, this connection is not clear and although mirror neurons are correlated to ASD, there is no proven causational relationship between dysfunctional mirror neurons and ASD. The study from 2023 might be considered contradictory to an earlier (2006) study on mirror neurons that found that high-functioning autistic children showed reduced mirror neuron activity in the brain's inferior frontal gyrus while imitating and observing emotional expressions in other children who were considered non-autistic.

=== Psychopathy ===
Psychopathy is a personality construct partly characterized by antisocial and aggressive behaviors, as well as emotional and interpersonal deficits including shallow emotions and a lack of remorse and empathy. The Diagnostic and Statistical Manual of Mental Disorders (DSM) and International Classification of Diseases (ICD) list antisocial personality disorder (ASPD) and dissocial personality disorder, stating that these have been referred to as or include what is referred to as psychopathy.

Psychopathy is associated with atypical responses to distress cues (e.g. facial and vocal expressions of fear and sadness), including decreased activation of the fusiform and extrastriate cortical regions, which may partly account for impaired recognition of and reduced autonomic responsiveness to expressions of fear, and impairments of empathy. Studies on children with psychopathic tendencies have also shown such associations. The underlying biological surfaces for processing expressions of happiness are functionally intact in psychopaths, although less responsive than in those of controls. The neuroimaging literature is unclear as to whether deficits are specific to particular emotions such as fear. Some fMRI studies report that emotion perception deficits in psychopathy are pervasive across emotions (positives and negatives).

One study on psychopaths found that, under certain circumstances, they could willfully empathize with others, and that their empathic reaction initiated the same way it does for controls. Psychopathic criminals were brain-scanned while watching videos of a person harming another individual. The psychopaths' empathic reaction initiated the same way it did for controls when they were instructed to empathize with the harmed individual, and the area of the brain relating to pain was activated when the psychopaths were asked to imagine how the harmed individual felt. The research suggests psychopaths can switch empathy on at will, which would enable them to be both callous and charming. The team who conducted the study say they do not know how to transform this willful empathy into the spontaneous empathy most people have, though they propose it might be possible to rehabilitate psychopaths by helping them to activate their "empathy switch". Others suggested that it remains unclear whether psychopaths' experience of empathy was the same as that of controls, and also questioned the possibility of devising therapeutic interventions that would make the empathic reactions more automatic.

Work conducted by Professor Jean Decety with large samples of incarcerated psychopaths offers additional insights. In one study, psychopaths were scanned while viewing video clips depicting people being intentionally hurt. They were also tested on their responses to seeing short videos of facial expressions of pain. The participants in the high-psychopathy group exhibited significantly less activation in the ventromedial prefrontal cortex, amygdala, and periaqueductal gray parts of the brain, but more activity in the striatum and the insula when compared to control participants. In a second study, individuals with psychopathy exhibited a strong response in pain-affective brain regions when taking an imagine-self perspective, but failed to recruit the neural circuits that were activated in controls during an imagine-other perspective—in particular the ventromedial prefrontal cortex and amygdala—which may contribute to their lack of empathic concern.

Researchers have investigated whether people who have high levels of psychopathy have sufficient levels of cognitive empathy but lack the ability to use affective empathy. People who score highly on psychopathy measures are less likely to exhibit affective empathy. There was a strong negative correlation, showing that psychopathy and lack of affective empathy correspond strongly. The DANVA-2 found those who scored highly on the psychopathy scale do not lack in recognising emotion in facial expressions. Therefore, such individuals do not lack in perspective-talking ability but do lack in compassion regarding the experiences of others.

Despite studies suggesting psychopaths have deficits in emotion perception and imagining others in pain, professor Simon Baron-Cohen claims psychopathy is associated with intact cognitive empathy, which would imply an intact ability to read and respond to behaviors, social cues, and what others are feeling. Psychopathy is, however, associated with impairment in the other major component of empathy—affective (emotional) empathy—which includes the ability to feel the suffering and emotions of others (emotional contagion), and those with the condition are therefore not distressed by the suffering of their victims. Such a dissociation of affective and cognitive empathy has been demonstrated for aggressive offenders.

=== Other conditions ===
Atypical empathic responses are also correlated with a variety of other conditions.

Borderline personality disorder is characterized by extensive behavioral and interpersonal difficulties that arise from emotional and cognitive dysfunction. Dysfunctional social and interpersonal behavior plays a role in the emotionally intense way people with borderline personality disorder react. While individuals with borderline personality disorder may show their emotions excessively, their ability to feel empathy is a topic of much dispute with contradictory findings. Some studies assert impairments in cognitive empathy in BPD patients yet no affective empathy impairments, while other studies have found impairments in both affective and cognitive empathy. Fluctuating empathy, fluctuating between normal range of empathy, reduced sense of empathy, and a lack of empathy has been noted to be present in BPD patients in multiple studies, although more research is needed to determine its prevalence, although it is believed to be at least not uncommon and may be a very common phenomenon. BPD is a very heterogenous disorder, with symptoms including empathy ranging wildly between patients.

One diagnostic criterion of narcissistic personality disorder is a lack of empathy and an unwillingness or inability to recognize or identify with the feelings and needs of others.

Schizophrenia is characterized by impaired affective empathy, as well as severe cognitive and empathy impairments as measured by the Empathy Quotient (EQ). These empathy impairments are also associated with impairments in social cognitive tasks. Characteristics of schizoid personality disorder include emotional coldness, detachment, and impaired affect corresponding with an inability to be empathic and sensitive towards others.

A study conducted by Jean Decety and colleagues at the University of Chicago demonstrated that subjects with aggressive conduct disorder demonstrate atypical empathic responses when viewing others in pain. Subjects with conduct disorder were at least as responsive as controls to the pain of others but, unlike controls, subjects with conduct disorder showed strong and specific activation of the amygdala and ventral striatum (areas that enable a general arousing effect of reward), yet impaired activation of the neural regions involved in self-regulation and metacognition (including moral reasoning), in addition to diminished processing between the amygdala and the prefrontal cortex.

Bipolar individuals have impaired cognitive empathy and theory of mind, but increased affective empathy. Despite cognitive flexibility being impaired, planning behavior is intact. Dysfunctions in the prefrontal cortex could result in the impaired cognitive empathy, since impaired cognitive empathy has been related with neurocognitive task performance involving cognitive flexibility.

Dave Grossman, in his book On Killing, reports on how military training artificially creates depersonalization in soldiers, suppressing empathy and making it easier for them to kill other people.

Antidepressants can reduce pain empathy, and is one treatment for excessive empathic pain, but other approaches with fewer side effects like mindfulness and mediation are also effective.

== Hyper-empathy ==
Hyper-empathy refers to a person having heightened empathy. Reasons and experiences of hyper-empathy vary. Some autistic people have reported experiencing hyper-empathy. In psychopathology, hyper-empathy is viewed as a symptom of a neurological disorder.

The term empath is sometimes used in a broader sense to describe someone who is more adept at understanding, i.e. is more sensitive to the feelings of others than the average person; or as a descriptor for someone who is higher on an empathetic "spectrum" of sorts.

Individuals with borderline personality disorder tend to have lower cognitive empathy but higher affective empathy compared to the general population. This is often referred to as emotional contagion.

== Effects ==
The capacity to empathize is a revered trait in society. Empathy is considered a motivating factor for unselfish, prosocial behavior, whereas a lack of empathy is related to antisocial behavior.

Apart from the automatic tendency to recognize the emotions of others, one may also deliberately engage in empathic reasoning. Such empathic engagement helps an individual understand and anticipate the behavior of another. Two general methods have been identified: An individual may mentally simulate fictitious versions of the beliefs, desires, character traits, and context of another individual to see what emotional feelings this provokes. Or, an individual may simulate an emotional feeling and then analyze the environment to discover a suitable reason for the emotional feeling to be appropriate for that specific environment.

An empathizer's emotional background may affect or distort how they perceive the emotions in others. Societies that promote individualism have lower ability for empathy. The judgments that empathy provides about the emotional states of others are not certain ones. Empathy is a skill that gradually develops throughout life, and which improves the more contact we have with the person with whom one empathizes.

Empathizers report finding it easier to take the perspective of another person in a situation when they have experienced a similar situation, and that they experience greater empathic understanding. Research regarding whether similar past experience makes the empathizer more accurate is mixed.

The extent to which a person's emotions are publicly observable, or mutually recognized as such has significant social consequences. Empathic recognition may or may not be welcomed or socially desirable. This is particularly the case when we recognize the emotions that someone has towards us during real time interactions. Based on a metaphorical affinity with touch, philosopher Edith Wyschogrod claims that the proximity entailed by empathy increases the potential vulnerability of either party.

=== Benefits of empathizing ===
People who score more highly on empathy questionnaires also report having more positive relationships with other people. Supporting this, a 2017 study measuring dispositional empathy with the Interpersonal Reactivity Index (IRI) found that individuals with higher empathic concern report having a greater number of close relationships. They report "greater life satisfaction, more positive affect, less negative affect, and less depressive symptoms than people who had lower empathy scores".

Children who exhibit more empathy also have more resilience. Research by Allemand, Steiger, and Fend (2015) support this by showing many benefits that come with the early development of empathy in adolescence. The main findings of the research indicate that early development of empathy in adolescence will help "predict social competencies in adulthood." In other words, their future ability to work well in groups, build relationships, and communicate effectively. Others include the development of social skills, cooperation, and positive relations in life, which further proves the benefit of empathy.

Empathy can be an aesthetic pleasure, "by widening the scope of that which we experience... by providing us with more than one perspective of a situation, thereby multiplying our experience... and... by intensifying that experience." People can use empathy to borrow joy from the joy of children discovering things or playing make-believe, or to satisfy our curiosity about other people's lives.

Whether or not the people who express empathy are viewed favorably depends on who they show empathy for. Such is the case in which a third party observes a subject showing empathy for someone of questionable character or generally viewed as unethical; that third party might not like or respect the subject for it. This is called "empathy backfire".

=== Empathy and power ===
People tend to empathize less when they have more social or political power. For example, people from lower-class backgrounds exhibit better empathic accuracy than those from upper-class backgrounds. In a variety of "priming" experiments, people who were asked to recall a situation in which they had power over someone else then demonstrated reduced ability to mirror others, to comprehend their viewpoints, or to learn from their perspectives.

=== Empathy and violence ===
Bloom says that although psychopaths have low empathy, the correlation between low empathy and violent behavior as documented in scientific studies is "zero". Other measures are much more predictive of violent behavior, such as lack of self-control.

=== Influence on helping behavior ===
Investigators into the social response to natural disasters researched the characteristics associated with individuals who help victims. Researchers found that cognitive empathy, rather than emotional empathy, predicted helping behavior towards victims. Taking on the perspectives of others (cognitive empathy) may allow these helpers to better empathize with victims without as much discomfort, whereas sharing the emotions of the victims (emotional empathy) can cause emotional distress, helplessness, and victim-blaming, and may lead to avoidance rather than helping.

Individuals who expressed concern for the vulnerable (i.e. affective empathy) were more willing to accept the COVID-19 pandemic lockdown measures that create distress.

People who understand how empathic feelings evoke altruistic motivation may adopt strategies for suppressing or avoiding such feelings. Such numbing, or loss of the capacity to feel empathy for clients, is a possible factor in the experience of burnout among case workers in helping professions. People can better cognitively control their actions the more they understand how altruistic behavior emerges, whether it is from minimizing sadness or the arousal of mirror neurons.

Empathy-induced altruism may not always produce pro-social effects, as it can create bias by leading one to prioritize those for whom empathy is felt over other potential pro-social goals. Researchers suggest that individuals are willing to act against the greater collective good or to violate their own moral principles of fairness and justice if doing so will benefit a person for whom empathy is felt.

Empathy-based socialization differs from inhibition of egoistic impulses through shaping, modeling, and internalized guilt. Therapeutic programs to foster altruistic impulses by encouraging perspective-taking and empathic feelings might enable individuals to develop more satisfactory interpersonal relations, especially in the long-term. Empathy-induced altruism can improve attitudes toward stigmatized groups, racial attitudes, and actions toward people with AIDS, the homeless, and convicts. Such resulting altruism also increases cooperation in competitive situations.

Empathy is good at prompting prosocial behaviors that are informal, unplanned, and directed at someone who is immediately present, but is not as good at prompting more abstractly-considered, long-term prosocial behavior.

Empathy can not only be a precursor to one's own helpful acts, but can also be a way of inviting help from others. If you mimic the posture, facial expressions, and vocal style of someone you are with, you can thereby encourage them to help you and to form a favorable opinion of you.

=== Conflict resolution ===
Empathy plays a crucial role in resolving conflicts by shifting the focus to understanding the other person's viewpoint, preventing miscommunication, and taking away biases. Being able to understand the other party's side of the argument gives them a different idea of what is creating the conflict. This helps in communicating the problem in a way that will take away any biases and allow for collaboration that will help resolve the conflict. While empathy can play an effective role in conflict resolution, there are situations where it may not have a significant impact.

While empathy can foster understanding and aid in resolving conflicts, some scholars argue that its effects are context-dependent and not universally positive. Empathy is not inherently moral and can be directed disproportionately toward in-groups, sometimes leading to empathic bias that exacerbates intergroup tensions. This phenomenon, often referred to as empathic tribalism, can intensify hostility toward perceived out-groups and be manipulated in political or nationalistic rhetoric. For example, empathy for the suffering of one's own group has historically been used to justify retaliatory aggression or military interventions.

Moreover, in conflict or wartime settings, empathy may be selectively disengaged, allowing individuals to maintain moral self-regard while endorsing or participating in violence against others. This process, known as moral disengagement, creates psychological distance from the suffering of out-groups while reinforcing loyalty to in-group members. These critiques suggest that while empathy plays a critical role in many conflict-resolution contexts, it is not a universal good and may, under certain conditions, contribute to moral bias, polarization, or even the justification of violence. Scholars such as Paul Bloom have argued for a more measured or rational approach to compassion that avoids the pitfalls of emotionally biased empathy.

=== Selective empathy ===
Selective empathy—when emotional concern is reserved for in-group members—has been linked to in-group favoritism and out-group dehumanization, particularly in political or wartime contexts. Paul Bloom and others have argued that such biased empathy may exacerbate social division and lead to ethically problematic decisions, suggesting that rational compassion may offer a more consistent moral framework. Psychologist Paul Bloom, author of Against Empathy, points out that empathic bias can result in tribalism and violent responses in the name of helping people of the same "tribe" or social group, for example when empathic bias is exploited by demagogues. He proposes "rational compassion" as an alternative; one example is using effective altruism to decide on charitable donations rationally, rather than by relying on emotional responses to images in the media.

Bloom also finds empathy can encourage unethical behavior when it causes people to care more about attractive people than ugly people, or people of one's own race vs. people of a different race. The attractiveness bias can also affect wildlife conservation efforts, increasing the amount of money devoted and laws passed to protect cute and photogenic animals, while taking attention away from species that are more ecologically important.

Some research suggests that people are more able and willing to empathize with those most similar to themselves. In particular, empathy increases with similarities in culture and living conditions. Empathy is more likely to occur between individuals whose interaction is more frequent. A measure of how well a person can infer the specific content of another person's thoughts and feelings was developed by William Ickes. In one experiment, researchers gave two groups of men wristbands according to which football team they supported. Each participant received a mild electric shock, then watched another go through the same pain. When the wristbands matched, both brains flared: with pain, and empathic pain. If they supported opposing teams, the observer was found to have little empathy.

=== Gullibility ===
Empathy can also be exploited by sympathetic beggars. Bloom points to the example of street children in India, who can get many donations because they are adorable but this results in their enslavement by organized crime. Bloom says that though someone might feel better about themselves and find more meaning in life than they give to the person in front of them, in some cases they would do less harm and in many cases do more good in the world by giving to an effective charity through an impersonal website. Bloom believes improper use of empathy and social intelligence can lead to shortsighted actions and parochialism.

=== Manipulative use ===
Scholars have noted that empathy can be manipulated or used disingenuously. This form of strategic or performative empathy, sometimes colloquially referred to as "fake empathy," can be employed to gain trust, manage impressions, or influence others emotionally without genuine concern for their well-being. Though not widely used in academic literature, the idea overlaps with the concept of instrumental empathy, in which empathic expressions are used to achieve non-empathic goals, such as persuasion, manipulation, or social control.

=== Compassion fatigue ===
Excessive empathy can lead to "empathic distress fatigue", especially if it is associated with pathological altruism. The medical risks are fatigue, occupational burnout, guilt, shame, anxiety, and depression. Tania Singer says that health care workers and caregivers must be objective regarding the emotions of others. They should not over-invest their own emotions in the other, at the risk of draining away their own resourcefulness. Paul Bloom points out that high-empathy nurses tend to spend less time with their patients, to avoid feeling negative emotions associated with witnessing suffering. This form of burnout can impair moral judgment, reduce caregiving effectiveness, and contribute to depersonalization.This distinction has practical relevance for understanding burnout in helping professions.

The widely used term 'compassion fatigue' describing the emotional exhaustion of caregivers exposed to chronic suffering may be a misnomer: because compassion is associated with positive affect and resilience rather than distress, the underlying phenomenon is better described as empathic distress fatigue, reflecting exhaustion from repeated unregulated empathic sharing rather than from compassion itself. In a controlled training study, participants who completed the empathy training showed increased activation in 'empathy-for-pain' regions (AI, mACC) when viewing others' suffering, accompanied by increased negative affect. In contrast, participants who completed compassion training showed activation in reward- and affiliation-related regions (medial orbitofrontal cortex, ventral striatum, pregenual anterior cingulate cortex) and increased positive affect, with the negative affect typically triggered by witnessing suffering reduced back to baseline.

== Empathic accuracy ==
Higher empathy tends to reduce the accuracy of deception detection, and emotion recognition training does not improve deception detection.

People can severely overestimate how much they understand others. When people empathize with another, they may oversimplify that other person in order to make them more legible. It may improve empathic accuracy for the empathizer to explicitly ask the person empathized with for confirmation of the empathic hypothesis. However, people may be reluctant to abandon their empathic hypotheses even when they are explicitly denied.

When people empathize with others, they may oversimplify them to make them easier to understand. This can lead to misperceiving how cohesive others are and to feeling, by comparison, that they themselves lack a strong, unified self. Fritz Breithaupt calls this the "empathic endowment effect". Because the empathic person must temporarily dampen their own sense of self in order to empathize with the other, and because the other seems to have a magnified and extra-cohesive sense of self, the empathic person may suffer from this and may "project onto others the self that they are lacking" and envy "that which they must give up in order to be able to feel empathy: a strong self".

== Therapeutic interventions ==
Empathy may be increased by therapeutic interventions including MDMA-assisted therapy, psychedelic-assisted therapy, exogenous oxytocin, neurostimulation, psychotherapy, and behavioral therapy.

== Disciplinary approaches ==
=== Philosophy ===
==== Ethics ====
In the 2007 book The Ethics of Care and Empathy, philosopher Michael Slote introduces a theory of care-based ethics that is grounded in empathy. He claims that moral motivation does, and should, stem from a basis of empathic response, and that our natural reaction to situations of moral significance are explained by empathy. He explains that the limits and obligations of empathy, and in turn morality, are natural. These natural obligations include a greater empathic and moral obligation to family and friends and to those close to us in time and space. Our moral obligation to such people seems naturally stronger to us than that to strangers at a distance. Slote explains that this is due to the natural process of empathy. He asserts that actions are wrong if and only if they reflect or exhibit a deficiency of fully developed empathic concern for others on the part of the agent. In a 2011 article, philosopher Michael Slote delves deeply into how empathy plays a role in moral judgment, suggesting that our ability to understand and determine right from wrong is influenced by empathy. He further stated that being able to empathize with others helps us stay away from behaviors that some deem to be unreasonable or heartless, which can happen because of a lack of empathy.

==== Phenomenology ====
In phenomenology, empathy describes the experience of something from the other's viewpoint, without confusion between self and other. This is based on the concept of agency. In the most basic sense, phenomenology is the experience of the other's body as "my body over there." In most other respects, however, it is an experience viewed through the person's own eyes; in experiencing empathy, what is experienced is not "my" experience, even though I experience it. Empathy is also considered to be the condition of intersubjectivity and, as such, the source of the constitution of objectivity.

=== History ===
Some postmodernist historians such as Keith Jenkins have debated whether or not it is possible to empathize with people from the past. Jenkins argues that empathy only enjoys such a privileged position in the present because it corresponds harmoniously with the dominant liberal discourse of modern society and can be connected to John Stuart Mill's concept of reciprocal freedom. Jenkins argues the past is a foreign country and as we do not have access to the epistemological conditions of bygone ages we are unable to empathize with those who lived then.

=== Psychotherapy ===
Heinz Kohut introduced the principle of empathy in psychoanalysis. His principle applies to the method of gathering unconscious material.

=== Business and management ===
Because empathy seems to have potential to improve customer relations, employee morale, and personnel management capability, it has been studied in a business context.

In the 2009 book Wired to Care, strategy consultant Dev Patnaik argues that a major flaw in contemporary business practice is a lack of empathy inside large corporations. He states that without empathy people inside companies struggle to make intuitive decisions, and often get fooled into believing they understand their business if they have quantitative research to rely upon. He says that companies can create a sense of empathy for customers, pointing to Nike, Harley-Davidson, and IBM as examples of "Open Empathy Organizations". Such companies, he claims, see new opportunities more quickly than competitors, adapt to change more easily, and create workplaces that offer employees a greater sense of mission in their jobs.

In the 2011 book The Empathy Factor, organizational consultant Marie Miyashiro similarly argues for bringing empathy to the workplace, and suggests Nonviolent Communication as an effective mechanism for achieving this.

The leadership consulting firm Development Dimensions International found in 2016 that 20% of U.S. employers offered empathy training to managers. A study by the Center for Creative Leadership found empathy to be positively correlated to job performance among employees as well.

Patricia Moore pioneered using empathic techniques to better understand customers. For example, she used makeup and prosthetics to simulate the experience of elderly people, and used the insights from this to inspire friendlier products for that customer segment. Design engineers at Ford Motor Company wore prosthetics to simulate pregnancy and old age, to help them design cars that would work better for such customers. Fidelity Investments trains its telephone customer service employees in a virtual reality app that puts them in a (dramatized) customer's home so they can experience what it is like to be on the other side of their conversations.

== In educational contexts ==
Another growing focus of investigation is how empathy manifests in education between teachers and learners. Research shows that empathy is important in developing classroom dynamics, fostering student engagement, and enhancing academic outcomes. In 2022, a systematic review of empathy's effectiveness in teaching shows that empathetic teacher-student relationships can result in a positive learning environment. Also, a study at Stanford University found that when a teacher applies active listening and emotional awareness approaches, it can lead to a significant (50%) decrease in suspension rates. It also shows empathy's ability to lessen discipline issues and create desirable academic outcomes.

Despite the positive outcomes, The Philosophy of Empathy emphasizes that empathy is deeply connected to morality, which helps us understand that developing empathy in teachers is challenging. Learning by teaching is one method used to teach empathy. Research also found that it is difficult to develop empathy in trainee teachers. [Students transmit new content to their classmates, so they have to reflect continuously on those classmates' mental processes. This develops the students' feeling for group reactions and networking. Carl R. Rogers pioneered research in effective psychotherapy and teaching which espoused that empathy coupled with unconditional positive regard or caring for students and authenticity or congruence were the most important traits for a therapist or teacher to have. Other research and meta-analyses corroborated the importance of these person-centered traits.

Within medical education, a hidden curriculum appears to dampen or even reduce medical student empathy.

== In intercultural contexts ==
According to one theory, empathy is one of seven components involved in the effectiveness of intercultural communication. This theory also states that empathy is learnable. However, research also shows that people experience more difficulty empathizing with others who are different from them in characteristics such as status, culture, religion, language, skin colour, gender, and age.

To build intercultural empathy in others, psychologists employ empathy training. Researchers William Weeks, Paul Pedersen, et al. state that people who develop intercultural empathy can interpret experiences or perspectives from more than one worldview. Intercultural empathy can also improve self-awareness and critical awareness of one's own interaction style as conditioned by one's cultural views and promote a view of self-as-process.

== In fiction ==
The greatest benefits we owe to the artist, whether painter, poet, or novelist, is the extension of our sympathies. Appeals founded on generalizations and statistics require a sympathy ready-made, a moral sentiment already in activity; but a picture of human life such as a great artist can give, surprises even the trivial and the selfish into that attention to what is apart from themselves, which may be called the raw material of moral sentiment.… Art is the nearest thing to life; it is a mode of amplifying experience and extending our contact with our fellow-men beyond the bounds of our personal lot.

— George Eliot

Lynn Hunt argued in Inventing Human Rights: A History that the concept of human rights developed how it did and when it did in part as a result of the influence of mid-eighteenth-century European novelists, particularly those whose use of the epistolatory novel form gave readers a more vivid sense that they were gaining access to the candid details of a real life. "The epistolatory novel did not just reflect important cultural and social changes of the time. Novel reading actually helped create new kinds of feelings including a recognition of shared psychological experiences, and these feelings then translated into new cultural and social movements including human rights." Literary scholar Lisa Zunshine has similarly argued that fiction engages and exercises readers' theory of mind, suggesting that the novel in its familiar form exists in part because it feeds this capacity.

The power of empathy has become a frequent ability in fiction, specifically in that of superhero media. "Empaths" have the ability to sense/feel the emotions and bodily sensations of others and, in some cases, influence or control them. Although sometimes a specific power held by specific characters such as the Marvel Comics character Empath, the power has also been frequently linked to that of telepathy such as in the case of Jean Grey.

The rebooted television series Charmed portrays the character Maggie Vera as a witch with the power of empathy. Her powers later expand to allow her to control the emotions of others as well as occasionally concentrate emotion into pure energy. In season four she learns to replicate people's powers by empathically understanding them.

In the 2013 NBC television show reinterpretation of Hannibal, the first episode introduces Will Graham. Graham is unique in that he seems to have exceptionally high levels of both cognitive and emotional empathy, combined with an eidetic memory and imagination. These abilities help him understand the motives of some of the most depraved killers. Hannibal Lecter calls his ability "pure empathy". Graham can assume the viewpoint of virtually anyone he meets, even viewpoints that sicken him. When evaluating a crime scene, he uses his imagination and empathy to almost become the killer, feeling what they were feeling during a murder.

Empathy is a Skill in the 2019 game Disco Elysium. It passively reveals what other characters are feeling.

== See also ==
- Against Empathy: The Case for Rational Compassion (book by Paul Bloom)
- Artificial empathy
- Attribution (psychology)
- Digital empathy
- Philip K. Dick's Do Androids Dream of Electric Sheep?
- Ecological empathy
- Emotional intelligence
- Emotional literacy
- Empathic concern
- Empathizing–systemizing theory
- Empathy in chickens
- Empathy in literature
- Empathy in online communities
- Ethnocultural empathy
- Grounding in communication
- Highly sensitive person
- Humanistic coefficient
- Identification (psychology)
- Life skills
- Mimpathy
- Mirror-touch synesthesia
- Moral emotions
- Oxytocin
- People skills
- Rapport
- Schema (psychology)
- Self-conscious emotions
- Sensibility
- Simulation theory of empathy
- Social emotions
- Soft skills
- Theory of mind in animals
- Vicarious embarrassment
