= DDI =

DDI may stand for:

== Companies and organizations ==
- DD International, international TV channel in India
- Development Dimensions International, a talent management company
- Direct Democracy Ireland, a political party in Ireland
- KDDI, formerly DDI, a Japanese telecommunications company
- Data Disc, Incorporated, a defunct American computer hardware company
- Data Design Interactive, a defunct shovelware gaming company

== Science ==
- Drug–drug interaction
- Didanosine, an antiretroviral drug

== Technology ==
- Acronym for DNS/DHCP/IPAM; see IP Address Management
- Direct dial-in, or direct inward dialing, a telecommunications service
- DirectX Device Driver Interface
- D&D Insider, an online method used to deliver Dungeons & Dragons content
- Diverging diamond interchange, a road structure that guides traffic

== Other uses ==
- Dance Dance Immolation, interactive performance piece
- Data Documentation Initiative, a standard for describing surveys, questionnaires, and statistical data files
- Democracy-Dictatorship Index, a binary measure of democracy and dictatorship
- Divisional detective inspector, a rank in the Criminal Investigation Department of London's police
