= Carolyn M. Byham =

American philanthropist

Carolyn Byham is an American philanthropist and community activist residing in Pittsburgh, Pennsylvania.

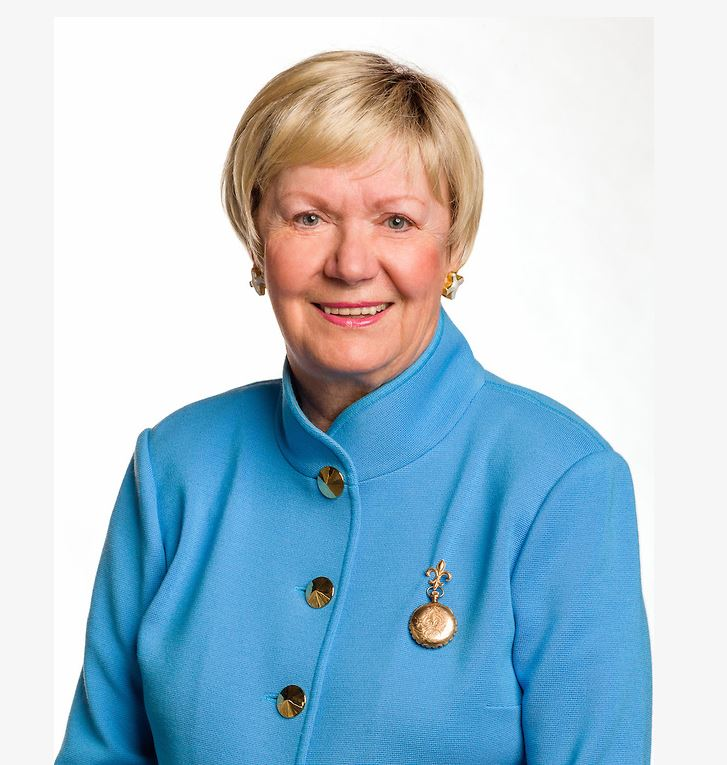
Carolyn M. Byham, Philanthropist

== Overview ==
For more than four-and-a-half decades, Carolyn has been very active in cultural and civic organizations in Pittsburgh and Mt. Lebanon, the suburb where she resides. She was elected as Mt. Lebanon City Commissioner and served from 1982 to 1990. She is past president of both the local chapter of the American Association of University Women and the Mt. Lebanon Civic League. Carolyn is currently on the board of trustees for the Chautauqua Institution. In the 1980s, she helped to found the Pittsburgh International Children’s Festival and continues to express her love of the arts through board memberships with the Pittsburgh Public Theater, Pittsburgh Cultural Trust, and the Pittsburgh Ballet Theatre. Carolyn is on the Honor Board of WQED public radio and television stations, where she is active in fundraising.

== Philanthropy ==
Carolyn and her husband, William C. Byham, are major contributors to many arts organizations in Pittsburgh. To restore a grand old performance venue, they provided the funds for what is now the Byham Theater, a 1300-seat theater in downtown Pittsburgh. And, to ensure the comfort and safety of the next generation of ballet dancers who come to Pittsburgh from around the world, the Byham's established the Byham House. Recently, plans for a spectacular new 14,000-square-foot annex to the Pittsburgh Ballet Theatre studios was unveiled and named the Byham Center for Dance Excellence, in honor of Bill and Carolyn.

== Early life ==
Carolyn Byham was born on November 11, 1941, in Easton, Pennsylvania.

She received her bachelor's degree in speech from West Virginia University and then attended Ohio State University on an assistantship, where she received her master's degree in Broadcasting.

From 1964 to 1968, Carolyn worked as an account executive in the public relations department of Batten, Barton, Durstine & Osborn (BBDO) advertising agency in New York City. In this role, she co-wrote cookbooks and produced three NFL half-time specials with CBS for her client, the Campbell Soup Company.

She is currently the Executive Vice President of Design and Planning for Development Dimensions International, headquartered in Pittsburgh, Pennsylvania.

She and her husband have two children: Tacy M. Byham, Ph.D., and Carter W. Byham.
