= Against Empathy =

2016 book by Paul Bloom

Against Empathy: The Case for Rational Compassion
- Author: Paul Bloom
- Language: English
- Subject: Psychology, empathy
- Genre: Non-fiction
- Publisher: Ecco Books
- Publication date: 2016
- Publication place: United States
- ISBN: 978-0-06-233934-8

Against Empathy: The Case for Rational Compassion is a 2016 book written by psychologist Paul Bloom. The book draws on the distinctions between empathy, compassion, and moral decision making. Bloom argues that empathy is not the solution to problems that divide people and is a poor guide for decision making. However, he is not completely against empathy; he believes that empathy can motivate kindness to make the world a better place. The book received mixed reviews.

== Definition of empathy ==
Paul Bloom defines empathy the way that Adam Smith describes sympathy in Theory of Moral Sentiments. For Bloom, "[e]mpathy is the act of coming to experience the world as you think someone else does" [emphasis in original]. He describes empathy as "a spotlight directing attention and aid to where it's needed." Empathy is an emotion that people mistake as a moral guide for their decision making; Bloom suggests it can blind morality. Empathy is limiting because it directs people's attentions to individuals or individual events, which can misguide certain acts of kindness. Therefore, he suggests that we overcome the problems created by empathy through the use of "conscious, deliberative reasoning in everyday life."

== Powers and limitations of empathy ==
Bloom develops his case for "rational compassion" by discussing acts of kindness and altruism. Bloom believes that people "can make decisions based on considerations of cost and benefits." He analyzes why and how people act altruistically and explains that oftentimes, empathy motivates people to act for self-serving reasons. Bloom also explores the neurological differences between feeling and understanding, which are central to demonstrating the limitations of empathy. He describes compassion the same way as Buddhist moral philosopher, Charles Goodman, defines Theravāda compassion in the book Consequences of Compassion: An Interpretation and Defense of Buddhist Ethics. With this understanding, Bloom describes empathy as feeling what others feel whereas compassion is "simply caring for people, [and] wanting them to thrive".

== Empathy versus compassion ==
Bloom also explains C. Daniel Batson's study on the "empathy-altruism hypothesis" which highlights empathy's biases. This hypothesis argues that people do acts of kindness due to empathy, but those acts may result in unintended consequences. Part of this is because people's moral evaluations of the people and events around them determine whether people feel empathy towards them. For example, "you feel more empathy for someone who is cooperating with you than for someone you are in competition with." It's the feeling of empathy that may influence people to do acts of kindness, or according to Bloom, acts of destruction. On the flip-side, low empathy can merit bad behavior.

To further his argument, Bloom describes effective altruism and its relationship with cost-benefit analysis decision making. He explains that rationalizing acts of kindness is a more effective guide for moral decisions than empathy. However, according to Bloom and a number of psychologists, people still make decisions using empathy without using rationality.

== Rational decision making ==
Bloom finishes the book by explaining how empathy is related to anger and evil. He explains how violence and anger can be products of empathy and that these things lead to evil. Evil, according to Bloom, is caused by dehumanization and objectification, processes which are caused in part by an abundance of empathy for the self. In the same vein, Bloom explains that sometimes people commit evil acts in support of their morality, which can be blinded by empathy.

The last chapter discusses concepts also touched in Daniel Kahneman's book, Thinking, Fast and Slow, that suggest people make a series of rational and irrational decisions. He criticizes the argument that "regardless of reason's virtues, we just aren't any good at it." His point is that people are not as "stupid as scholars think they are." He explains that people are rational because they make thoughtful decisions in their everyday lives. For example, when someone has to make a big life decision they critically assess the outcomes, consequences, and alternative options. Ultimately, Bloom argues for a utilitarian approach to acts of altruism instead of empathy.

== Reception ==
This book received mixed reviews. Jennifer Senior in The New York Times referred to the book as a "a bit too clotted with caveats to be a seamless read" and questioned some of Bloom's assertions, but called the book "invigorating" and "an overt, joyful conversation with readers". Salley Vickers in The Guardian agreed with Bloom's case for rational compassion on the basis that rational compassion was more valuable than empathy.

In an interview with Bloom about the book for Vox, Sean Illing challenged Bloom's position and suggested that empathy is a tool that can be used for good or ill, to which Bloom responded that "empathy is just a bad idea" and "there are better and more reliable tools" for moral reasoning.

Philosopher Manuel Camassa's 2024 book On the Power and Limits of Empathy includes chapters on what Camassa calls the "anti-empathism" of Bloom's Against Empathy and of articles by Jesse Prinz. Camassa said that Bloom's extremely negative view of empathy is "misguided and that the rift that emerged between convinced supporters and harsh critics of empathy has tended to polarise the discussion". Camassa aimed to find a middle ground between extremely positive and negative accounts of empathy, a position in which empathy is not at the base of morality but does have a central role to play in morality.

Jennifer Szalai's 2025 New York Times Book Review essay, "The Politics of the War on Empathy", compared Bloom's book to two more-recent books by conservative Christians, Allie Beth Stuckey's Toxic Empathy (2024) and Joe Rigney's The Sin of Empathy (2025), and to attacks on empathy by prominent people in US politics. Szalai contrasted people like Bloom who critique empathy as a tool for moral reasoning to "anti-empathy warriors" who seem to be against "any shared sense of common humanity". She quoted personal communication with Bloom, who distinguished his view from "near neighbors to my view which are just calls for cruelty and bias".

== See also ==
- Dark empathy
- Identifiable victim effect
