= Immolation =

Immolation may refer to:

- Death by burning
- Self-immolation, the act of burning oneself
- Immolation (band), a death metal band from Yonkers, New York
- The Immolation, a 1977 novel by Goh Poh Seng
- Dance Dance Immolation, an interactive performance piece using a modified Dance Dance Revolution
- "Immolation" (VisionQuest), an episode of the television miniseries VisionQuest
- "Brünnhilde's Immolation Scene", the closing scene of Richard Wagner's opera Götterdämmerung
