= Suzanne Keen =

Literary scholar

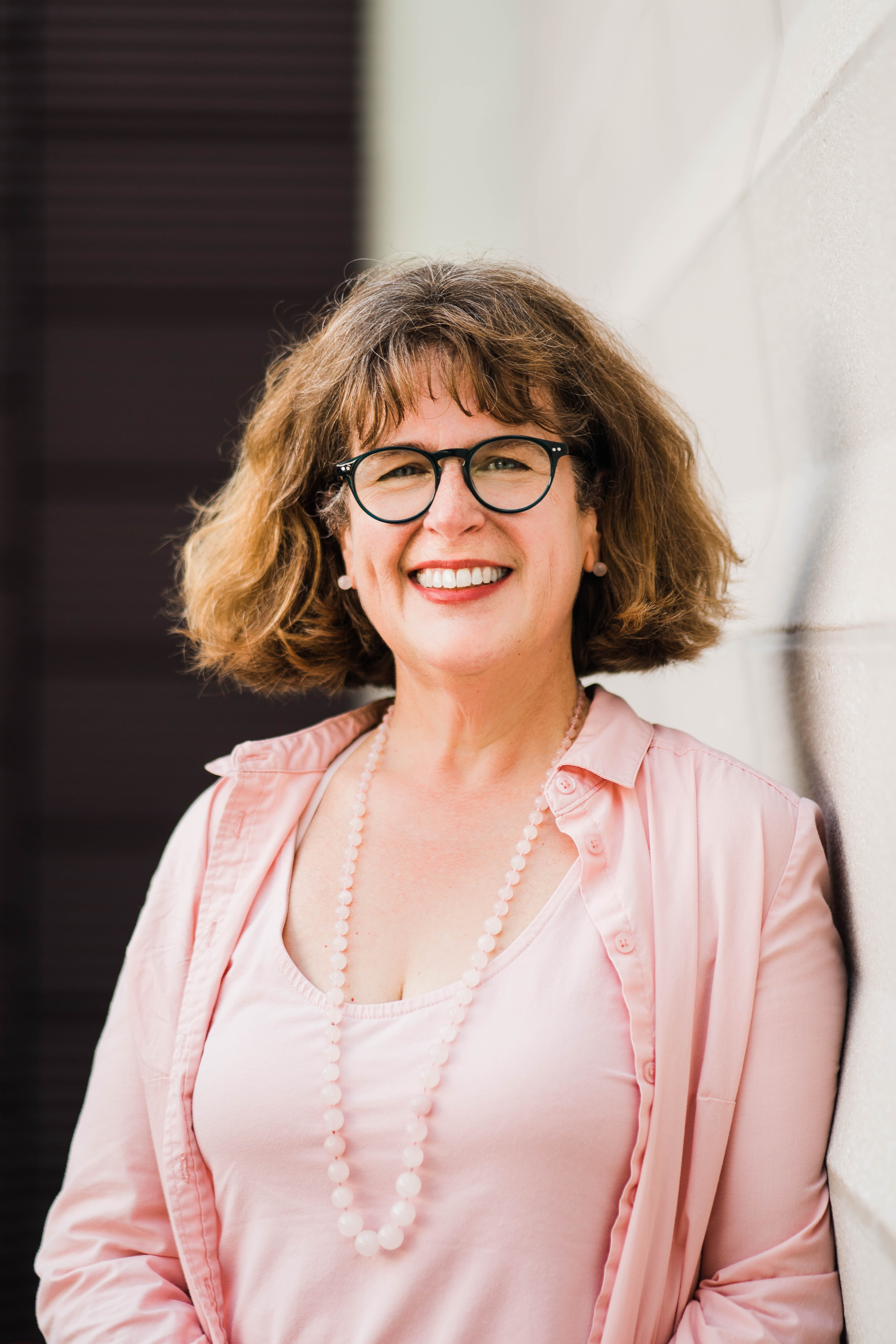
- Keen in 2021

10th President of Scripps College
- In office July 1, 2022 – March 20, 2023
- Preceded by: Lara Tiedens
- Succeeded by: Amy Marcus-Newhall

Personal details
- Born: 1963 (age 62–63) Bethlehem, Pennsylvania
- Occupation: Literary scholar, feminist critic, poet, author and academic administrator
- Awards: Younger Scholars Fellowship, National Endowment for the Humanities; The Academy of American Poets Prize, Harvard University Fellowship, National Endowment for the Humanities

Academic background
- Education: A.B., English Literature (Honors) and Studio Art; A.M., Creative Writing; M.A., English Language and Literature; Ph.D., English Language and Literature
- Alma mater: Brown University; Harvard University
- Thesis: Narrative annexes: Resources of difference and kind (1990)
- Doctoral advisor: Philip Fisher

Academic work
- Discipline: English literature
- Institutions: Scripps College; Hamilton College; Washington and Lee University; Yale University

Suzanne Keen is a literary scholar, feminist critic, a poet, author and academic administrator. She was W. M. Keck Foundation Presidential Chair and Professor of English at Scripps College, the women's college of the Claremont Colleges. Previously she served as Dean of the College at Washington and Lee University and Vice President for Academic Affairs, Dean of Faculty, and Professor of Literature at Hamilton College. She became president of Scripps College on July 1, 2022. Dr. Keen announced her resignation from Scripps College effective March 20, 2023. Her resignation letter states she intends to return to teaching at Scripps after a sabbatical on the East Coast to be near elderly family members.

Keen is best known for her work on narrative empathy. She has published numerous essays and chapters on aspects of narrative empathy, extending the theories and applications of her book, Empathy and the Novel (2007). She has also published widely on contemporary British fiction, Victorian novels, postcolonial literature, and narrative theory.

From 2012 until 2018, Keen co-edited the Oxford University Press journal Contemporary Women's Writing.

== Education ==
Keen studied at Brown University and received her Bachelor of Arts degree in English Literature (Honors) and Studio Art in 1984, and a master's degree in Creative Writing in 1986. She then enrolled at Harvard University and earned her Master's and doctorate in English Language and Literature in 1987 and 1990, respectively.

== Career ==
Keen held an appointment as an assistant professor of English in 1990 at Yale University. She then joined Washington and Lee University as assistant professor of English in 1995, and was promoted to associate professor in 1997, and to Professor of English in 2001. From 2005 until 2018, she served there as Thomas H. Broadus Professor of English, before joining Hamilton College as Professor of Literature from 2018 to 2022. At Scripps she is a member of the Department of English.

Keen's administrative appointments began with terms as Chair of Department of English in 2010, and Interim Dean of the College at Washington and Lee University in 2012. She was named Dean of the College in 2013, a role she served in until 2018, when she became Vice President for Academic Affairs and Dean of Faculty at Hamilton College, concluding a four-year term in 2022.

== Research ==
Keen is best known for her work on narrative empathy. She is a contextual cognitive/affective narrative theorist, with a background in feminist rhetorical narrative theory, and has edited or co-edited special issues of Poetics Today and Style. Her books include Thomas Hardy’s Brains: Psychology, Neurology, and Hardy’s Imagination (2014) Empathy and the Novel (2007), Narrative Form (2015), Romances of the Archive in Contemporary British Fiction (2001), and Victorian Renovations of the Novel (1998). Since Empathy and the Novel, she has expanded on her theory of narrative empathy in articles and chapters treating authorial strategic narrative empathy, readers’ dispositions, empathetic techniques in graphic narratives, narrative empathy evoked by nonfiction, narrative personal distress, and empathic inaccuracy. A selection of these essays and chapters appeared in 2022 under the title Empathy and Reading: Affect, Impact, and the Co-Creating Reader.

Keen published an article in 2006 proposing a theory of narrative empathy, while highlighting the processes and techniques of neuroscientific and psychological investigation of empathy. She posed a series of questions about the impact of narrative empathy on readers. Keen's published poetry has appeared in Chelsea, The English Journal, The Graham House Review, The House Mountain Review, The Ohio Review, Quarterly West, and The Rhode Island Review, among others. She has also authored a book of poems, Milk Glass Mermaid.

== Awards and honors ==
- 1984 – Younger Scholars Fellowship, National Endowment for the Humanities
- 1997–98 – Individual Artist's Fellowship, Commonwealth of Virginia
- 1999–2000 – National Endowment for the Humanities Fellowship
- 2001 – Fellow, the British Council's 27th Cambridge Seminar on the Contemporary British Writer
- 2008 – Outstanding Faculty Award, State Council of Higher Education for Virginia (One of twelve awarded state-wide)

== Bibliography ==
=== Books ===
- Victorian Renovations of the Novel: Narrative Annexes and the Boundaries of Representation (1998) ISBN 9780511581977 ; (2015) ISBN 9780511581977
- Romances of the Archive in Contemporary British Fiction (2001) ISBN 9781442679450 ; (2016) ISBN 9780802086846
- Narrative Form (2003). ISBN 978-0-230-50348-9 .
- Milk Glass Mermaid (2007) ISBN 9780911015836
- Empathy and the Novel (2007) ISBN 9780195175769
- Thomas Hardy's Brains: Psychology, Neurology, and Hardy's Imagination (2014) ISBN 9780814293522
- Narrative Form: Revised and Expanded Second Edition (2015) ISBN 9781137439581
- Empathy and Reading: Affect, Impact, and the Co-Creating Reader (2022) ISBN 9781032205335

=== Selected articles . ===
- Keen, Suzanne (2006). "A Theory of Narrative Empathy". Narrative. 14 (3): 207–236. doi:10.1353/nar.2006.0015. JSTOR 20107388. S2CID 52228354.
- Keen, Suzanne (2011). "Introduction: Narrative and the Emotions". Poetics Today. 32: 1–53. doi:10.1215/03335372-1188176.
- Keen, Suzanne (2011). "Fast Tracks to Narrative Empathy: Anthropomorphism and Dehumanization in Graphic Narratives". SubStance. 40: 135–155. doi:10.1353/sub.2011.0003. S2CID 143535433.
- Keen, Suzanne (2020). "Empathic Inaccuracy in Narrative Fiction". Topoi. 39 (4): 819–825. doi:10.1007/s11245-018-9622-9. S2CID 255110997.
- Keen, Suzanne (2021). "Ancient Characters and Contemporary Readers: A Response to Elizabeth e. Shively & Jan Rüggemeier and Cornelis Bennema". Biblical Interpretation. 29 (4–5): 452–466. doi:10.1163/15685152-29040003. S2CID 244472012.
