= Byham Theater =

Theater and movie theater in Pittsburgh, Pennsylvania

Coordinates: 40.4439°N 80.0025°W

- The Fulton Theater, The Gayety Theater
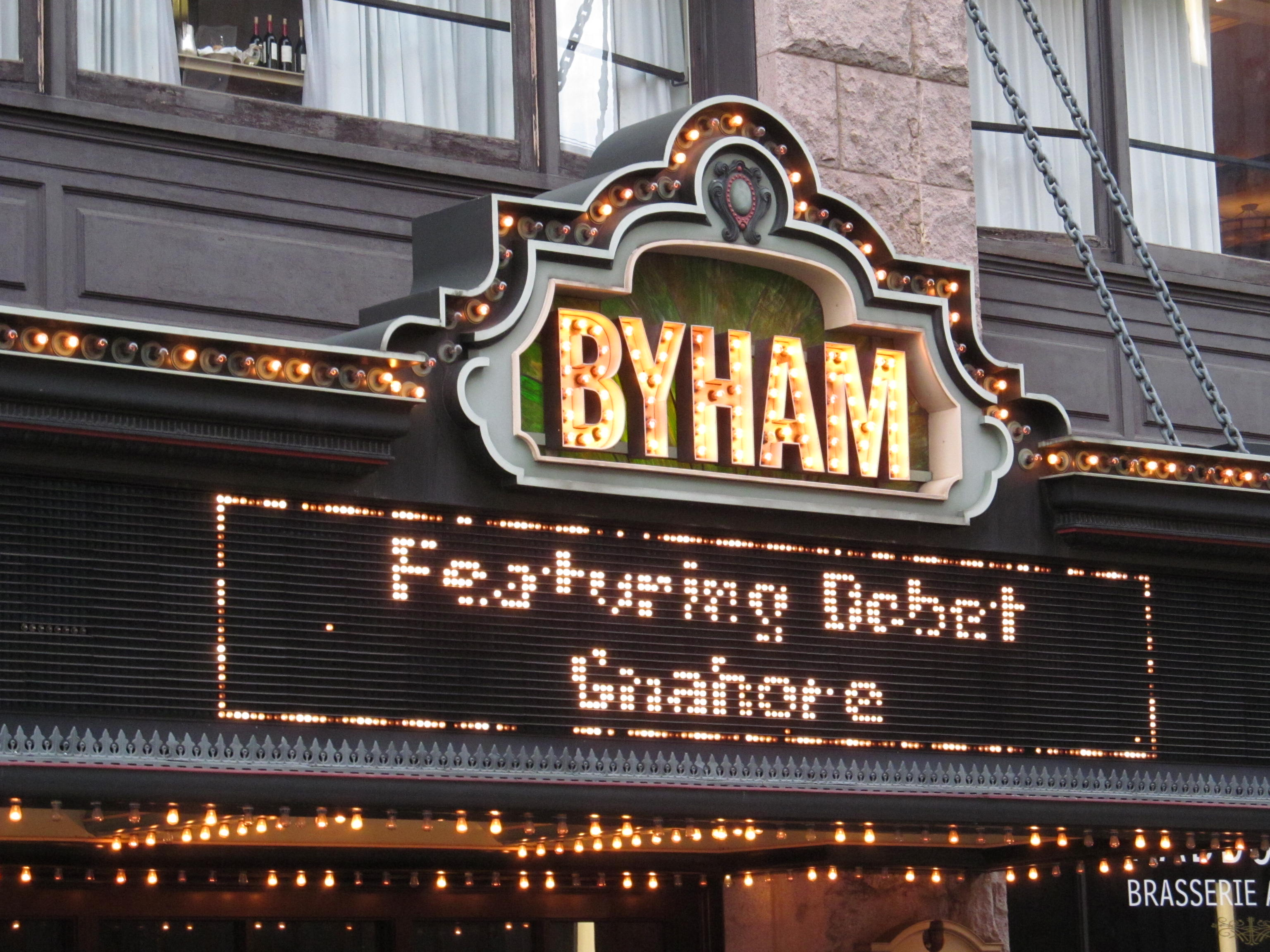
- Interactive map of Byham Theater
- Address: 101 Sixth Street; Pittsburgh, Pennsylvania; United States
- Owner: Pittsburgh Cultural Trust
- Capacity: 1,300
- Current use: Performing arts center

Construction
- Opened: Halloween night, 1904
- Rebuilt: 1990

Website
- trustarts.org

Pittsburgh Landmark – PHLF
- Designated: 2002

The Byham Theater is a landmark building at 101 Sixth Street in the Cultural District of Downtown Pittsburgh, Pennsylvania, United States. Originally built in 1903 as The Gayety Theater, the former vaudeville house was renovated and reopened as The Byham Theater in 1990.

Built in 1903 and opened Halloween night 1904, the then-named Gayety Theater was stage and vaudeville house, and it featured stars such as Ethel Barrymore, Gertrude Lawrence, and Helen Hayes. It was renamed The Fulton in the 1930s when it became a full-time movie theater. The classic horror film Night of the Living Dead, which was filmed in and around Pittsburgh, had its world premiere at the Fulton in 1968. In 1990 the Pittsburgh Cultural Trust bought the theater and refurbished the Fulton as part of its plan for the Cultural District. Carolyn M. Byham and William C. Byham of Pittsburgh made a major naming gift for a 1995 renovation, and it has been the Byham Theater since.

== 1960 World Series Game Seven ==
For the 50th anniversary of the Bill Mazeroski's series winning home run, the first public showing of the Game 7 tape discovered in December 2009 was hosted by Bob Costas at the theater on November 13, 2010 at 6 p.m. Mazeroski was joined by Pirate MVP Dick Groat and former Yankee Bobby Richardson to be interviewed during the showing of the game. MLB Network then telecast the game and interviews nationally.

== See also ==
- Theatre in Pittsburgh
