= Hyper-empathy =

Heightened sense of empathy

Hyper-empathy refers to a person having heightened empathy. Reasons and experiences of hyper-empathy vary. Some autistic people have reported experiencing hyper-empathy. In psychopathology, hyper-empathy is viewed as a symptom of a neurological disorder.

The term empath is sometimes used in a broader sense to describe someone who is more adept at understanding, i.e. is more sensitive to the feelings of others than the average person; or as a descriptor for someone who is higher on an empathetic "spectrum" of sorts.

Individuals with borderline personality disorder tend to have lower cognitive empathy but higher affective empathy compared to the general population. This is often referred to as emotional contagion.

== Autism ==
Academic literature has long associated autism with empathy deficits. A 2024 study collected the experiences of a diverse group of 76 autistic people and found that there was a high proportion of hyper-empathic experiences.

== Psychopathology ==
In neuropsychology, "hyper empathy" has also been described as a dysfunctional empathic emotional overreaction. Some researchers have suggested that hyper-empathy might arise as a consequence of a lack of emotion regulation and hyperactivation of the amygdala.

A paper published in 2013 reported on a case of a patient who became hyper-empathic after receiving resective epilepsy surgery, a form of brain surgery. The patient's behavioral modification remained unchanged for 13 years.

Neuroscientists have found evidence to suggest that some people have greater or lesser ability to share and feel the emotions of others. Mirror neurons are neurons that fire both when an animal acts and when the animal observes the same action performed by another. Interfering with the level of activation of mirror neurons via transcranial magnetic stimulation (TMS) has been experimentally studied.
