= Contemporary Women's Writing =

- Discipline: Contemporary women's writing
- Language: English
- Edited by: Suzanne Keen, Emma Parker

Publication details
- History: 2007-present
- Publisher: Oxford University Press (United Kingdom)
- Frequency: Triannually

Standard abbreviations
- ISO 4: Contemp. Women's Writ.

Indexing
- ISSN: 1754-1476 (print); 1754-1484 (web)
- LCCN: 2008210106
- OCLC no.: 214332701

Links
- Journal homepage; Online access; Online archive

Contemporary Women's Writing is a triannual academic journal, affiliated to the Contemporary Women's Writing Association, which critically assesses writing by women authors who have published from approximately 1970 to the present.

The journal is a published by Oxford University Press and its editors-in-chief are Suzanne Keen (Washington and Lee University) and Emma Parker (University of Leicester).

== History ==
The journal was established in 2007, with Mary Eagleton (Leeds Metropolitan University) and Susan Stanford Friedman (University of Wisconsin-Madison) as founding editors.

== Awards ==
In 2009, the journal won The Council of Editors of Learned Journals award for best new journal at the Modern Language Association's conference in Philadelphia.

== Abstracting and indexing ==
- Annotated Bibliography for English Studies
- Feminist Periodicals
- MLA International Bibliography
- Scopus
- Studies on Women and Gender Abstracts
- Arts and Humanities Citation Index
- Current Contents /Arts & Humanities
