= Lara Tiedens =

American academic administrator

9th President of Scripps College
- In office August 1, 2016 – April 2021
- Preceded by: Lori Bettison-Varga
- Succeeded by: Suzanne Keen

Personal details
- Occupation: Social psychologist and academic administrator
- Awards: Fellow, Society for Personality and Social Psychology; Fellow, Center for Advanced Study in the Behavioral Sciences

Academic background
- Education: B.A. in Psychology, magna cum laude, Carleton College; M.A. and Ph.D. in Psychology, University of Michigan, Ann Arbor
- Alma mater: Carleton College; University of Michigan, Ann Arbor

Academic work
- Discipline: Social psychology
- Sub-discipline: Organizational behavior
- Institutions: Stanford University; Scripps College

Larissa Z. Tiedens is an American social psychologist and academic administrator known for her research on emotions, social hierarchy, and organizational behavior. She has held prominent academic leadership roles at Stanford University and Scripps College. Tiedens was president of Scripps College from 2016 to 2021 and later became executive director of the Schwarzman Scholars program. As of 2025, she serves as the Sarah Miller McCune Interim Director of the Center for Advanced Study in the Behavioral Sciences (CASBS) at Stanford University.

== Education ==
Tiedens earned her Bachelor of Arts degree magna cum laude in Psychology from Carleton College in Northfield, Minnesota, where she was elected to Phi Beta Kappa and received distinction in her major and thesis in 1993. She went on to earn her M.A. and Ph.D. in Psychology from the University of Michigan, Ann Arbor.

== Career ==
Tiedens joined the faculty of the Stanford Graduate School of Business in 1998, where she served as Assistant, Associate, and Full Professor of Organizational Behavior. She was later named the Jonathan B. Lovelace Professor of Organizational Behavior and held multiple leadership positions, including Morgan Stanley Director of the Center for Leadership Development and Research (2011–2012) and Senior Associate Dean of Academic Affairs (2012–2016).

From 2016 to 2021, Tiedens served as president of Scripps College in Claremont, California, where she also held the Keck Presidential Chair and a professorship in psychology. While at Scripps College, Tiedens worked extensively on expanding access for low-income students. She stepped down to become executive director of Schwarzman Scholars in 2021. In this role, she oversaw a $500 million endowment and a graduate program focused on global leadership.

As of 2025, Tiedens serves as the Sarah Miller McCune Interim Director of the Center for Advanced Study in the Behavioral Sciences (CASBS) at Stanford University. She also serves as a Faculty Affiliate at SPARQ, a social psychological research center.

== Selected awards and honors ==
- Fellow of the Society for Personality and Social Psychology
- Fellow of the Center for Advanced Study in the Behavioral Sciences (2008–09)
- Ph.D. Distinguished Faculty Teaching Award, Stanford Graduate School of Business (2002)

== Selected publications ==
- Tiedens, L. Z. & Fragale, A. R. (2003). Power moves: Complementarity in submissive and dominant nonverbal behavior. Journal of Personality and Social Psychology, 84, 558–568.
- Tiedens, L. Z. & Leach, C. W. (Eds.) (2004). The Social Life of Emotions. Cambridge University Press.
- Lerner, J. S. & Tiedens, L. Z. (2006). Portrait of the angry decision maker: How appraisal tendencies shape anger's influence on cognition. Journal of Behavioral Decision Making, 19, 115–137.
- Fragale, A. R., Sumanth, J., Tiedens, L. Z., & Northcraft, G. (2012). Appeasing equals: Lateral deference in organizational communication. Administrative Science Quarterly, 57, 373–406.
- Williams, M. J. & Tiedens, L. Z. (2015). The subtle suspension of backlash: A meta-analysis of penalties for women’s implicit and explicit dominant behavior. Psychological Bulletin, 142(2), 165–197.
