= Paul Bloom (psychologist) =

Canadian-American psychologist

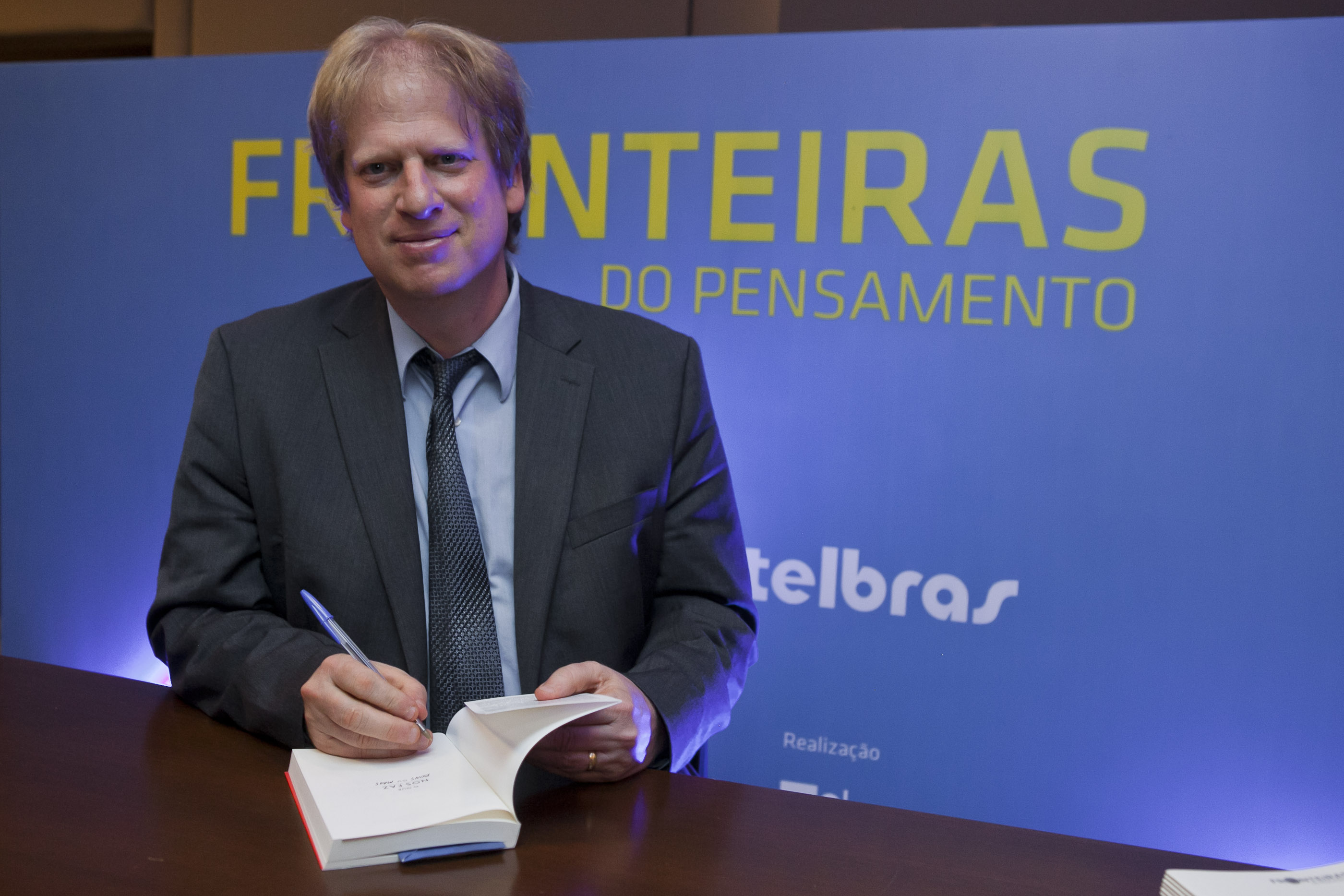
- Bloom in 2014
- Born: December 24, 1963 (age 62); Montreal, Quebec, Canada
- Citizenship: Canada, US
- Education: McGill University (BA); Massachusetts Institute of Technology (PhD)
- Occupations: Professor of Psychology, University of Toronto; Brooks and Suzanne Ragen Professor Emeritus of Psychology and Cognitive Science, Yale University
- Awards: Stanton Prize; Lex Hixon Prize; Klaus J. Jacobs Research Prize
- Scientific career
- Fields: Psychology
- Workplaces: University of Toronto; Yale University; University of Arizona
- Thesis: Semantic structure and language development (1990)
- Doctoral advisor: Susan Carey
- Website: campuspress.yale.edu/paulbloom

Paul Bloom (born December 24, 1963) is a Canadian-American psychologist. He is the Brooks and Suzanne Ragen Professor Emeritus of psychology and cognitive science at Yale University and Professor of Psychology at the University of Toronto. His research explores how children and adults understand the physical and social world, with special focus on language, morality, religion, fiction, and art.

== Early life, family and education ==
Bloom was born into a Jewish family in Montreal, Quebec.

He attended McGill University and earned his Bachelor of Arts in psychology. He attended graduate school at the Massachusetts Institute of Technology, where he earned a PhD in cognitive psychology under the supervision of Susan Carey.

== Career ==
From 1990 to 1999, he taught psychology and cognitive science at the University of Arizona. Since 1999, he has been a professor of psychology and cognitive science at Yale University.

Since 2003, Bloom has served as co-editor in chief of the scholarly journal Behavioral and Brain Sciences.

In 2021, he joined the University of Toronto's Department of Psychology.

Bloom has held the Harris Visiting Professorship at the Harris Center for Developmental Studies at the University of Chicago (2002); the Nijmegen Lectureship at the Max Planck Institute at the University of Nijmegen (2006); the Templeton Lectureship at Johns Hopkins University (2007–8); and the Visiting Distinguished SAGE Fellowship at the UCSB SAGE Center for the Study of Mind (2010).

He has had regular appearances on National Public Radio and Bloggingheads.tv.

== Author ==
Bloom is the author of seven books and editor or co-editor of three others. His research has appeared in Nature and Science, and his popular writing has appeared in The New York Times, The Guardian, The American Scientist, Slate and The Atlantic.

Bloom's views are based in rationalism. A self-declared atheist, his writings often challenge and attempt to dispel notions of the existence of deities and the afterlife. His article in The Atlantic, "Is God an Accident?" was included in The Best American Science Writing 2006. Bloom concludes that "the universal themes of religion are not learned." Taking cues from Charles Darwin, Bloom posits that humanity's spiritual tendencies emerged within the evolutionary process, most likely as "accidental by-products" of other traits.

== Honors and awards ==
In 2002, the Society for Philosophy and Psychology awarded Bloom the Stanton Prize for outstanding early-career contributions to interdisciplinary research in philosophy and psychology, and in 2005–06, he served as the society's president. In 2006, he was made a fellow of the American Psychological Society in recognition of his "sustained outstanding contributions to the science of psychology".

In 2004, he received the Lex Hixon Prize for teaching excellence in the social sciences at Yale. In 2007, his Introduction to Psychology class was selected as an outstanding Yale course to be made available worldwide through the Open Yale Courses initiative.

In 2017, he received the $1 million Klaus J. Jacobs Research Prize for his research on the emergence of a sense of morality in children.

== Personal life ==
As a rationalist and a self-declared atheist, he rejects all notions of spirits, deities, and the afterlife.

== Works ==
=== Books ===
- Bloom, P. (1994). Language Acquisition: Core Readings. Cambridge, Massachusetts: MIT Press.
- Bloom, P.; Peterson, M.; Nadel, L.; & Garrett, M. (1996). Language and Space. Cambridge, Massachusetts: MIT Press.ISBN 0262522667
- Jackendoff, R.; Bloom, P.; & Wynn, K. (1999). Language, Logic, and Concepts: Essays in Honor of John Macnamara. Cambridge, Massachusetts: MIT Press.ISBN 9780262600460
- Bloom, P. (2000). How Children Learn the Meanings of Words. Cambridge, Massachusetts. MIT Press.ISBN 0262024691
- Bloom, P. (2004). Descartes' Baby: How the Science of Child Development Explains What Makes Us Human. New York: Basic Books.ASIN B008UYQFES
- Bloom, P. (2010). How Pleasure Works: The New Science of Why We Like What We Like. New York: W. W. Norton & Co.ISBN 0393066320
- Bloom, P. (2013). Just Babies: The Origins of Good and Evil. The Crown Publishing Group.ISBN 0307886840
- Bloom, P. (2016). Against Empathy: The Case for Rational Compassion. Ecco. ISBN 0062339338
- Bloom, P. (2021). The Sweet Spot: The Pleasures of Suffering and the Search for Meaning. HarperCollins.ISBN 0062910566
- Bloom, P. (2023). Psych: The Story of the Human Mind. HarperCollins. ISBN 0063096358

=== Selected popular articles ===
- (December 2005). "Is God an accident?" The Atlantic Monthly.
- (June 2006). "Seduced by the flickering lights of the brain". Seed Magazine.
- (November 2008). "First-person Plural". Atlantic Monthly.
- (November 2008). "Does religion make you nice?". Slate.
- (June 2009). "No Smiting". (Book Review: The Evolution of God by Robert Wright). The New York Times.
- (August 2009). "What's Inside a Big Baby Head?" (Book Review: The Philosophical Baby by Alison Gopnik). Slate.
- (September 2009). "The long and short of it". The New York Times.
- (March 2010). "How do morals change?". Nature.
- (May 2010). "The Moral Life of Babies". The New York Times Magazine.
- (January 2012). "Religion, Morality, Evolution". Annual Review of Psychology, vol. 63. Religion, Morality, Evolution.
- (November 2013). "Politicians Really Are Big Babies", Time.
- (March 2014). "The War on Reason", The Atlantic.
