= Empathy in literature =

Interdisciplinary concept

Empathy, as an interdisciplinary concept, usually studied within social and psychological context, plays an important role in consuming literature and fiction in particular. This concept is known as narrative empathy. Defined by Taylor et al. in 2002–2003, individuals experience narrative empathy when they are able to feel with (emotional empathy), take the perspectives of (cognitive empathy), or experience a simulation with the likeness thereof a character within that narrative. When looking at empathy in literature, there are two main concepts that can be looked at. Learning empathy through literature, or narrative empathy, is more thoroughly and academically studied than narratives of empathy, which are prevalent across various types of fiction.

== Narrative empathy ==
Narrative empathy is the effect of reading literature on the reader. Often, reading makes us more empathetic, but narrative empathy also studies which types of literature have a positive empathetic response and which types of individuals are more likely to be affected. To measure it, the following subscales are considered:

1. Fantasy: the individual’s ability to mentally move themselves out of the real world and into the fictional world,
2. Perspective Taking: someone’s inclination towards adopting other perspectives,
3. Empathic Concern: otherwise known as sympathy, or someone’s ability to feel for others in pain,
4. Personal Distress: feeling with others or sharing in their pain.

== Fiction ==
Mar et al., in a study of 94 participants, identified that the primary mode of literature that increases empathy is fiction, as opposed to non-fiction. Other studies verify these results and go on to specify that active fiction in particular engages with the reader and affects the reader’s empathy, at the very least in adults, rather than passive, entertainment fiction. This might be due to the parallels recognized between narrative and real-world comprehension as well as narrative fiction and real-world events. Empirical evidence, moreover, proved that fiction yielded a higher chance to get an individual involved in a narrative, while non-fiction did not. Fiction requires the reader to imagine the characters' situations and conditions, a phenomenon called “perspective taking."

The main literature on empathy looks at fiction, but other forms of literature are also important. For example, poetry is a more popular form to invoke empathy in neurodivergent readers, and it has the capacity to teach about high sensitivity when it comes to human difference.

== Gender ==
Although there is no notable difference between empathy increase across different genders, literature has shown to offer young men the space to experience and express their empathy. Several studies looking at the subscales mentioned above showed that the significant increase in empathy was in perspective taking, but those who had a higher perspective taking score to begin showed less increase. There was also an increase in concern for others. In fact, a person’s desire to increase their empathy has been shown to lead to a concrete increase in empathy and is subsequently associated with a shift in moral values as well.
