= Sean Illing =

American journalist and academic

- Born: Biloxi, Mississippi
- Occupation: Journalist
- Education: Louisiana State University (PhD)

Website
- seanilling.wordpress.com

Sean Illing is an American journalist, author, philosopher, and public speaker, currently serving as a senior writer at Vox and the host of the podcast The Gray Area. His work focuses on contemporary political philosophy, culture, and the intersection of ideas in modern society. Illing's career has spanned academia, journalism, and podcasting.

== Early life and education ==
Illing was born and raised in Biloxi, Mississippi, though he has strong ties to Louisiana, which he considers a second home. His family history traces back to New Orleans, and he spent significant time in Baton Rouge during his formative years. Illing earned a Doctorate in political science and philosophy from Louisiana State University (LSU) in 2014. His academic work focused on political theory, exploring the philosophical underpinnings of ideologies and their impact on individual and collective identities.

== Career ==
Before transitioning to journalism, Illing worked as an adjunct professor at LSU and Loyola University. He taught courses on politics and philosophy but found limited opportunities for tenure-track positions in academia. This led him to pivot toward writing and journalism.

Illing began his journalism career as a blogger and freelance writer. His early work appeared in outlets such as Salon, Slate, The Huffington Post, and Alternet. In 2016, he joined Vox as an interviews writer. Over the years, he has conducted interviews with figures in politics, philosophy, and culture. His writing often delves into the philosophical dimensions of contemporary issues.

In addition to his journalistic work, Illing co-authored the book The Paradox of Democracy with Zac Gershberg. Published by the University of Chicago Press, the book examines the challenges facing democratic systems in an era dominated by misinformation and media fragmentation.

Illing is the host of The Gray Area, a podcast that takes a philosophical approach to discussions on culture, technology, politics, and ideas.

== Personal life ==
Illing resides in Gulfport, Mississippi. He is a veteran of the United States Air Force, where he served as a paramedic from 2002 to 2005. His experiences in both military service and academia have shaped his perspectives on politics and society.
