= William C. Byham =

American psychologist, entrepreneur, and author

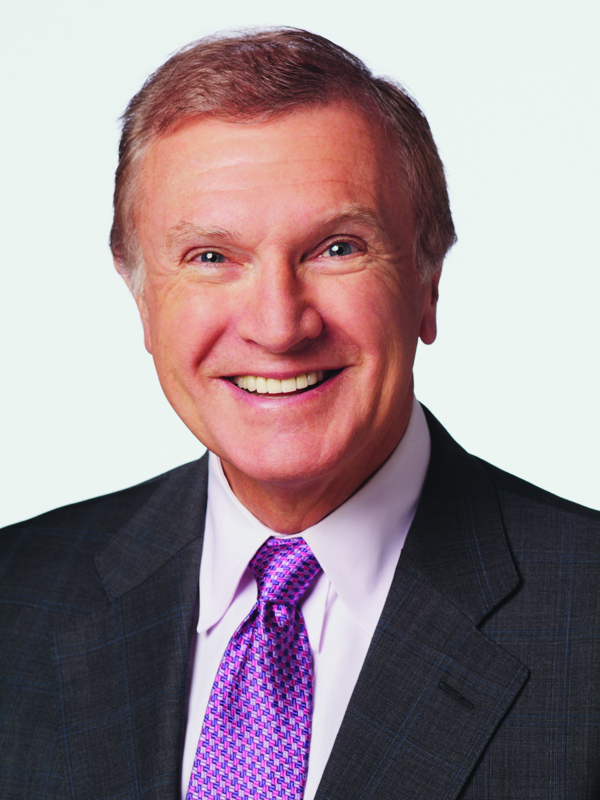
- Co-Founder, Chairman and CEO of DDI
- Born: September 14, 1936 (age 90)
- Education: Ohio University (BS, MS); Purdue University (PhD)
- Occupations: Industrial/Organizational Psychologist, Author, Chairman & CEO
- Spouse: Carolyn Byham

William C. Byham (born September 14, 1936) is an American entrepreneur, author and industrial/organizational psychologist.

== Overview ==
Byham, co-founder (with Dr. Douglas Bray), chairman and CEO of Development Dimensions International (DDI) is an Industrial/Organization Psychologist who has developed many significant human resource technologies over the course of his career. These innovations include the assessment center method, behavior-based interviewing, the use of behavior-modeling in supervisor and management training, behavioral job analysis methodology as the basis for selection and training programs, and Acceleration Pools to select and rapidly develop people for high-level leadership positions. These technologies have been described in 23 books and more than 300 monographs and articles. In addition, he has appeared on numerous radio and TV programs through the world.

Byham earned a Ph.D. in Industrial Organizational Psychology from Purdue University where he also received an honorary doctorate degree in Social Sciences. He earned a M.S. and B.S. from Ohio University.

Byham founded DDI in the basement of his home in 1970. The human resources consulting firm has since grown into an international organization with 42 offices in 26 countries.

Byham authored the book Zapp! The Lighting of Empowerment, which has sold more than 4.5 million copies and was named the best business book of the decade by Schwartz Books.

== Innovation ==
Assessment Centers for Business Applications

For the last 40 years, Byham has been an advocate for the Assessment Center Method and has helped assessment centers become a widely used management practice worldwide.

In an assessment center, individuals go through simulations that mirror the challenges they would face in a higher level job. Their behavior in the simulations is observed relative to competencies associated through research with job success. Before Bray applied the Assessment Center Method to business at AT&T, it was used in the British Army and the Office of Strategic Services (predecessor to the CIA).

Byham was manager of selection, appraisal, and general management development for J. C. Penney, where with Bray's help he implemented the first Assessment Centers in a retail environment. Byham wrote the first general business article (“Assessment Centers for Spotting Future Managers”) about the Assessment Center Method in the Harvard Business Review, generating interest in the methodology.

In 1970, Bray and Byham formed DDI to introduce the method to businesses throughout the world.

In 1972, Byham founded the International Congress on the Assessment Center Method and has been active in its leadership ever since. Each year more than 200 practitioners from around the world meet to share research findings and practical knowledge. Byham's books, Assessment Centers and Managerial Performance (co-authored with George Thornton) and Applying the Assessment Center Method (co-edited with Joseph Moses), are still standard references.

Behavior-based Interviewing

In addition to his work with assessment centers, Byham developed a new way to conduct hiring interviews. This method markedly improved the validity of selection decisions. Generically known as behavioral interviewing, DDI named the methodology Targeted Selection in 1975. Millions of managers have been trained in Targeted Selection and it has been adopted by 3,000 organizations around the world. Inc. Magazine said “What Tom Peters is to excellence and Jim Collins is to leadership, Bill Byham might very well be to hiring.”

Behavioral Modeling

Byham's assessment centers proved the potential of behavioral modeling as a new way to teach supervisors and managers to be leaders. Trainees who went through a behavioral modeling program did much better in assessment centers. Created by Mel Sorcher and Arnold Goldstein, behavior modeling approached supervisor and management training as skill development, rather than an effort to provide cognitive understanding of why people behave as they do. The common methodology at that time was lectures. With Jim Robinson, a training manager from Agway, Byham developed the first commercial behavior modeling training system, called Interaction Management. Every year, more than one million people are trained using this methodology.

== Publications ==
Byham has a wide repertoire of publications ranging from how to be an effective Industrial Organizational Psychologist to teams to assessment centers to interviewing. Byham is the author of 23 books including Zapp!, which helps managers understand how to empower employees and improve productivity. Byham co-authored three books on teams, two books on the Assessment Center Method, and a book to guide individuals and managers in Japanese companies in their relationships to Western workers.

His recent books include:

- 2015, a special Chinese edition of his book, Grow Your Own Leaders was published.
- 2014, a digital version of Interview Skills That Get You The Job, the sequel to Landing the Job You Want.
- 2008, Leadership Success in China: An Expatriate’s Guide (with Yue-er Luo and Erik Duerring)
- 2007, 70: The New 50—Retirement Management^{SM}—Retaining the energy and expertise of experienced employees
- 2002, Grow Your Own Leaders: How to identify, develop and retain leadership talent (with Audrey M. Smith and Matthew J. Paese)

== Philanthropy ==
Byham's involvement in Pittsburgh's arts community includes helping to fund the renovation to the former Fulton Theater in the Pittsburgh Cultural District, which re-opened as the Byham Theater, and for bringing Pittsburgh's classical music station to the heart of its downtown Cultural District through the Carolyn M. Byham WQED fm89.3 Studio. Byham and his wife Carolyn's endowment to the Pittsburgh Ballet Theatre Ballet School was used to renovate a house to give pre-professional ballet dancers a place to stay while they're attending the school. Recently, plans for a spectacular new 14,000-square-foot annex to the Pittsburgh Ballet Theatre studies was unveiled and named the Byham Center for Dance Excellence, in honor of Bill and Carolyn.

Byham also established the William C. Byham Chair in Organizational Psychology at Ohio University and the William C. Byham Chair in Organizational Psychology at Purdue University.

== Honors ==
- 2014 H.J. Zoffer Medal for Meritorious Service Award
- 2014 St. Barnabas CEO Leadership Award
- 2013 Innovation Award for Continuous Development of Assessment Center Methods from the 3rd National Congress Assessment Center, Indonesia
- 2013 Legacy Award (outstanding contribution to the science, practice, and organization of assessment centers) from the South African Assessment Center Study Group
- 2003 Inc. magazine (March 2003), Adam Hanft wrote: “What Tom Peters is to excellence and Jim Collins is to leadership, William C. Byham, who co-founded DDI back in 1970, might very well be to hiring.”
- 1994 Perhaps the most prestigious award that Byham has received, the Tunku Abdul Rahman Medal, the highest civilian award given by the country of Malaysia. The two previous recipients were heads of state.
- 1991 Gold Medal Award of Life Achievement in the Application of Psychology from the American Psychological Foundation
- 1986 Outstanding Contribution to Psychology and Management Award from the Society of Psychologists in Management along with Doug Bray
