= Fritz Alwin Breithaupt =

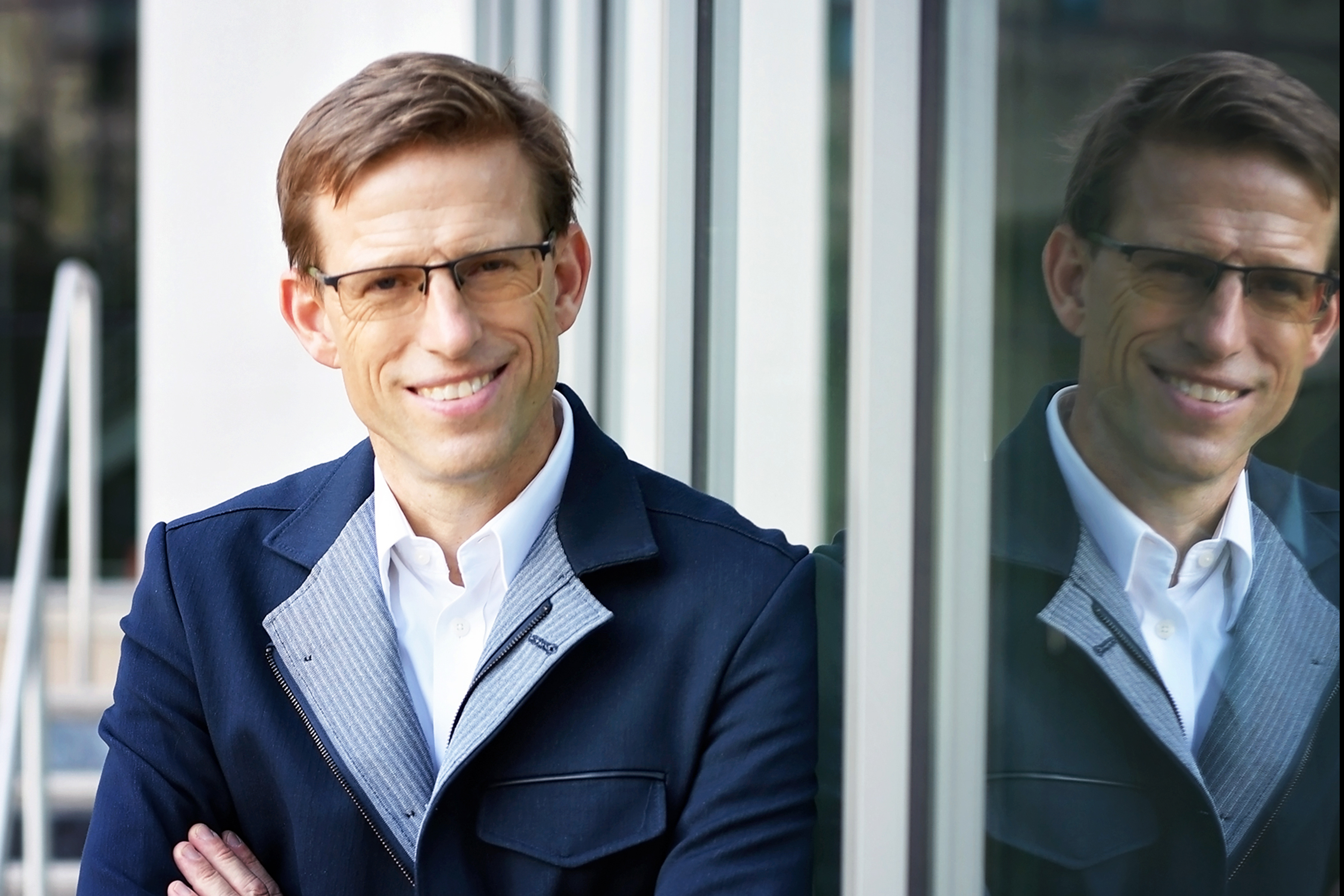

Fritz Breithaupt (born 1967) is a scholar and critic in the fields of German literature, intellectual history, and cognitive science. He is Provost Professor of Germanic Studies and Cognitive Science and chair of the Department of Germanic Studies at Indiana University Bloomington.

== Career ==
Fritz Breithaupt graduated from the Universität Hamburg in 1991, and received both an MA (1993) and PhD (1997) in Germanic Studies from Johns Hopkins University. He has been teaching at Indiana University, Bloomington since 1996, since 2010 as a full professor of Germanic Studies, an adjunct professor of Comparative Literature, and an affiliate professor of Cognitive Science. He co-founded the European Union Center at Indiana University in 2005 and served as its co-director until 2007. In Germany, he is most well known outside of academic circles as a columnist for ZEIT Campus magazine and the author of the recurring feature "Frag den Prof" ("Ask the professor"). His academic research focuses on German literary history from the eighteenth to the twentieth centuries, with particular emphasis on such authors as Goethe, Lessing, Kleist, Benjamin, Nietzsche, Derrida, and Celan. In particular, his work on Goethe's novel Elective Affinities has been compared to Walter Benjamin's. In 2009–10, he was the distinguished Remak Scholar of Indiana University. He has twice (in 2003 and 2009) won the grant of the Alexander von Humboldt foundation, which is "granted in recognition of a researcher's entire achievements to date to academics whose fundamental discoveries, new theories, or insights have had a significant impact on their own discipline and who are expected to continue producing cutting-edge achievements in the future." His 2017 book on the dark sides of empathy offers an analysis of Donald Trump's technique to draw empathy to himself. The book appeared on the German bestseller list in February 2017(Spiegel-Bestseller Liste).

== Selected publications ==
=== Books ===
- Jenseits der Bilder: Goethes Politik der Wahrnehmung, 2000 (ISBN 3793092283)
- Der Ich-Effekt des Geldes: Zur Geschichte einer Legitimationsfigur, 2008 (ISBN 3596180597)
- Kulturen der Empathie, 2009 (ISBN 3518295063)
- Culturas de la Empatía, 2011 (ISBN 8492946369)
- Kultur der Ausrede, 2012 (ISBN 3518296019)
- Die dunklen Seiten der Empathie, 2017 (ISBN 3518297961)

=== Edited volumes ===
- Empathie und Erzählung (with Claudia Breger), 2010 (ISBN 3793096203)
- Narrative Empathy (with Claudia Breger): special issue of Deutsche Vierteljahrschrift, September 2008
- Goethe and the Ego, special section of Goethe Yearbook XI, 2002
- Goethe and Wittgenstein: Seeing the Worlds Unity in its Variety (with Richard Raatzsch and Bettina Kremberg), Wittgenstein Studies 5, 2002

=== Articles and Essays ===
- "A Three-Person Model of Empathy” in: Emotion Review 4, 2012
- “Von Gott gerufen werden: Narration und Ausrede,” in Stefan Börnchen, Georg Mein, Martin Roussel, Eds., Namen, Ding, Referenzen, 2012
- “The Birth of Narrative from the Spirit of the Excuse. A Speculation,” in: Poetics Today 32, 2011
- “How is Empathy Possible? Four Models,” forthcoming in: Paula Leverage, Howard Mancing, Richard Schweickert, Jennifer Marston William, Eds., Theory of Mind and Literature
- “How I feel your Pain: Lessing’s Mitleid, Goethe’s Anagnorisis, Fontane’s Quiet Perversion,” in: Deutsche Vierteljahrschrift, 2008
- “The Invention of Trauma in German Romanticism,” in: Critical Inquiry, 2005
- “The Culture of Images: Goethe’s Elective Affinities,” in: Monatshefte 92.3, 2000
