= Dance Dance Immolation =

Interactive performance piece

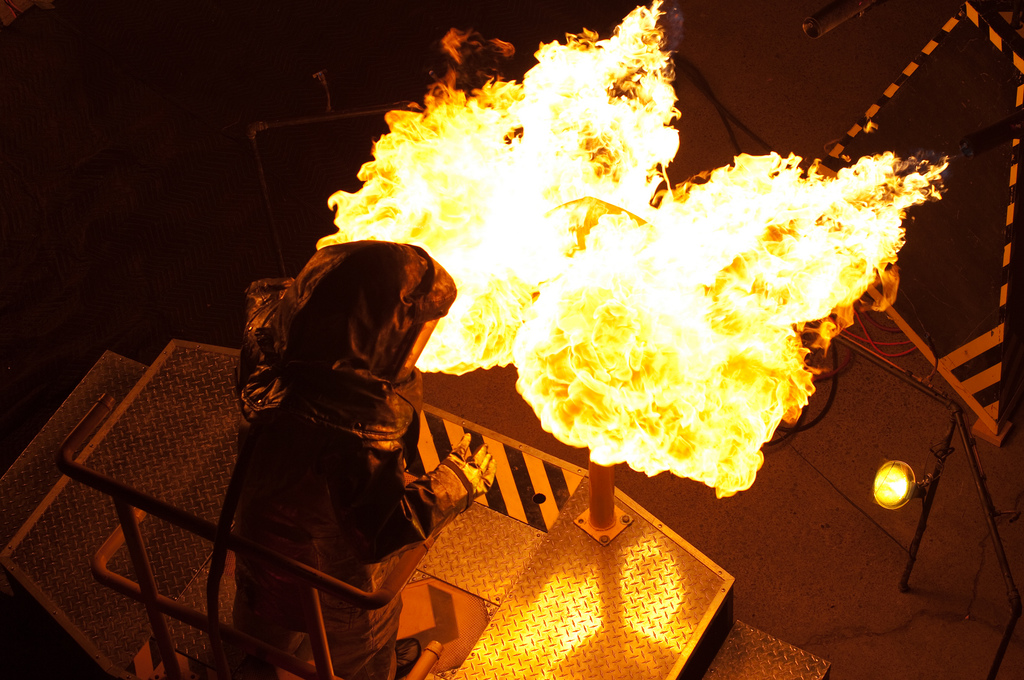
A dancer suited up to play the game.

Dance Dance Immolation was an interactive performance piece by fire art group Interpretive Arson based out of the artist work space known as NIMBY in East Oakland. It is a modified version of Dance Dance Revolution where players are shot with fire if they perform poorly. Participants are not harmed since they wear a fire proximity suit with forced-air respirators. Numerous other safeguards are built into the system to ensure the players are not subject to direct flame exposure or inhalation of superheated air. The piece was premiered in 2005 and ran at various festivals and private events internationally. It was retired in 2013 at Burning Man, where all the components were gathered into a pile and a piano was dropped on it.

== History ==
Members of Interpretive Arson began the project in 2005, when they received a grant from BORG2, an offshoot of artists associated with the West Coast art festival Burning Man. The game premiered at The Crucible's Fire Arts Festival in Oakland, California, before the current version, a full two-player game, was completed and installed at Burning Man in 2005. The game reappeared at Burning Man 2006 and 2007, and occasionally in Interpretive Arson's warehouse in Oakland, until 2007. In 2009 Dance Dance Immolation appeared at Smukfest in Denmark.

In 2013, Dance Dance Immolation was taken back out to the Burning Man festival for its final run. It was, at the end of the week, destroyed by dropping a piano on it.

== Press and awards ==
In 2010, Guinness World Records 2010 Gamer's Edition listed Dance Dance Immolation as the "Hottest Videogame", attaining a maximum of 1200˚ C (2192˚ F).

Other awards:

- San Francisco Bay Guardian Best of The Bay 2009, Arts and Nightlife
- "Disco Inferno". Wired. November 2006. Archived from the original on November 2, 2006.
- Boing Boing TV May 2009, "Dance Dance Revolution. With Flamethrowers. Pointed at You."
