= Development Dimensions International =

US-based human resources company

DDI (Development Dimensions International)
- Company type: Privately held company
- Industry: Human resource consulting, Talent management
- Founded: 1970
- Headquarters: Pittsburgh, PA, USA
- Number of locations: 26 countries
- Area served: Worldwide
- Key people: William C. Byham, Founder Douglas Bray, Founder; Tacy M. Byham, CEO David Tessmann-Keys, President
- Number of employees: 1,100 employees
- Website: www.ddi.com

Development Dimensions International (DDI) is an international human resources and leadership development consultancy. DDI works with organizations to make changes related to leadership development, leadership selection, succession management, and execution and performance.

The company is headquartered in Pittsburgh, Pennsylvania and has more than 1,100 employees throughout 42 offices in 26 countries. William C. Byham, is chairman, Tacy M. Byham is CEO, and David Tessmann-Keys is president.

== Company Overview ==
DDI was founded in 1970 by William C. Byham, and Douglas Bray. DDI introduced the assessment center approach for identifying leadership skills. Byham’s article, Assessment Centers for Spotting Future Managers (Harvard Business Review), led to inquiries about the process, and later, Byham approached Bray about a partnership.

DDI later branched out into leadership development. It introduced a leadership development program based on behavior modeling: Interaction Management. DDI next created a stand-alone behavioral interviewing system, Targeted Selection, which ensures compliance with Equal Employment Opportunity laws.

DDI’s also works on new HR technology, methodology, and content, including mid- and senior-level development, online assessment for frontline and mid-level leaders, and best practices for succession management.

== Selected publications ==
- Your First Leadership Job: How Catalyst Leaders Bring Out the Best in Others by Tacy M. Byham, Ph.D., and Richard S. Wellins, Ph.D.
- Grow Your Own Leaders by William Byham, Ph.D.
- Realizing the Promise of Performance Management by Robert W. Rogers.
- Zapp The Lightning of Empowerment by William Byham, Ph.D., which has sold more than 4.5 million copies to date.
- Seventh edition of DDI’s Global Leadership Forecast. Presented with The Conference Board.
- "Global Selection Forecast 2012: Know More. Guess Less." Conducted in partnership with Oracle.
