= List of people with bipolar disorder =

Numerous notable people have had some form of mood disorder. This is a list of people accompanied by verifiable sources associating them with some form of bipolar disorder (formerly known as "manic depression"), including cyclothymia, based on their own public statements; this discussion is sometimes tied to the larger topic of creativity and mental illness.

In the case of dead people only, individuals with a speculative or retrospective diagnosis should only be listed if they are accompanied by a source reflective of the mainstream, academic view. Individuals should not be added to this list unless the disorder is regularly and commonly mentioned in mainstream, reliable sources.

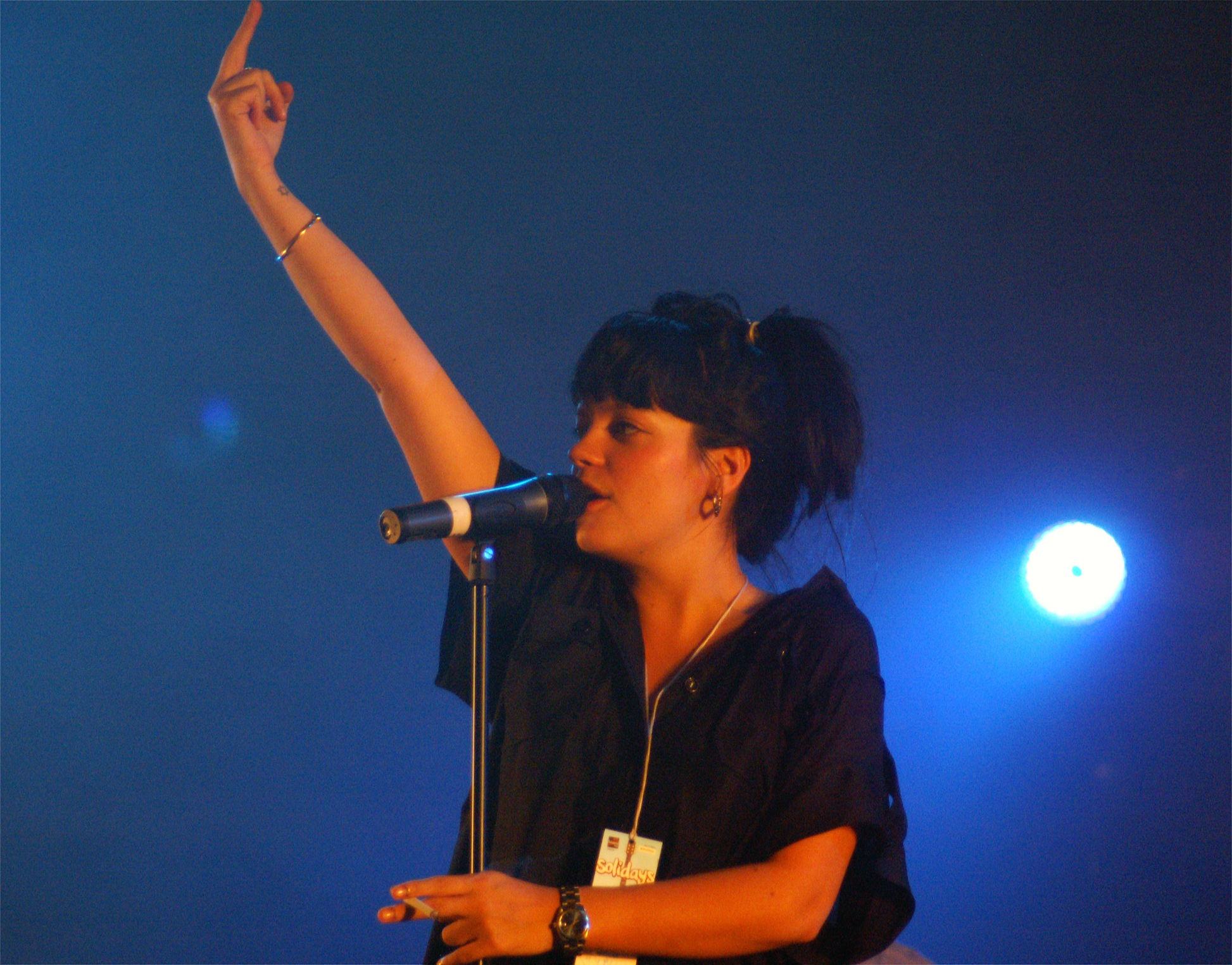
Lily Allen, musician

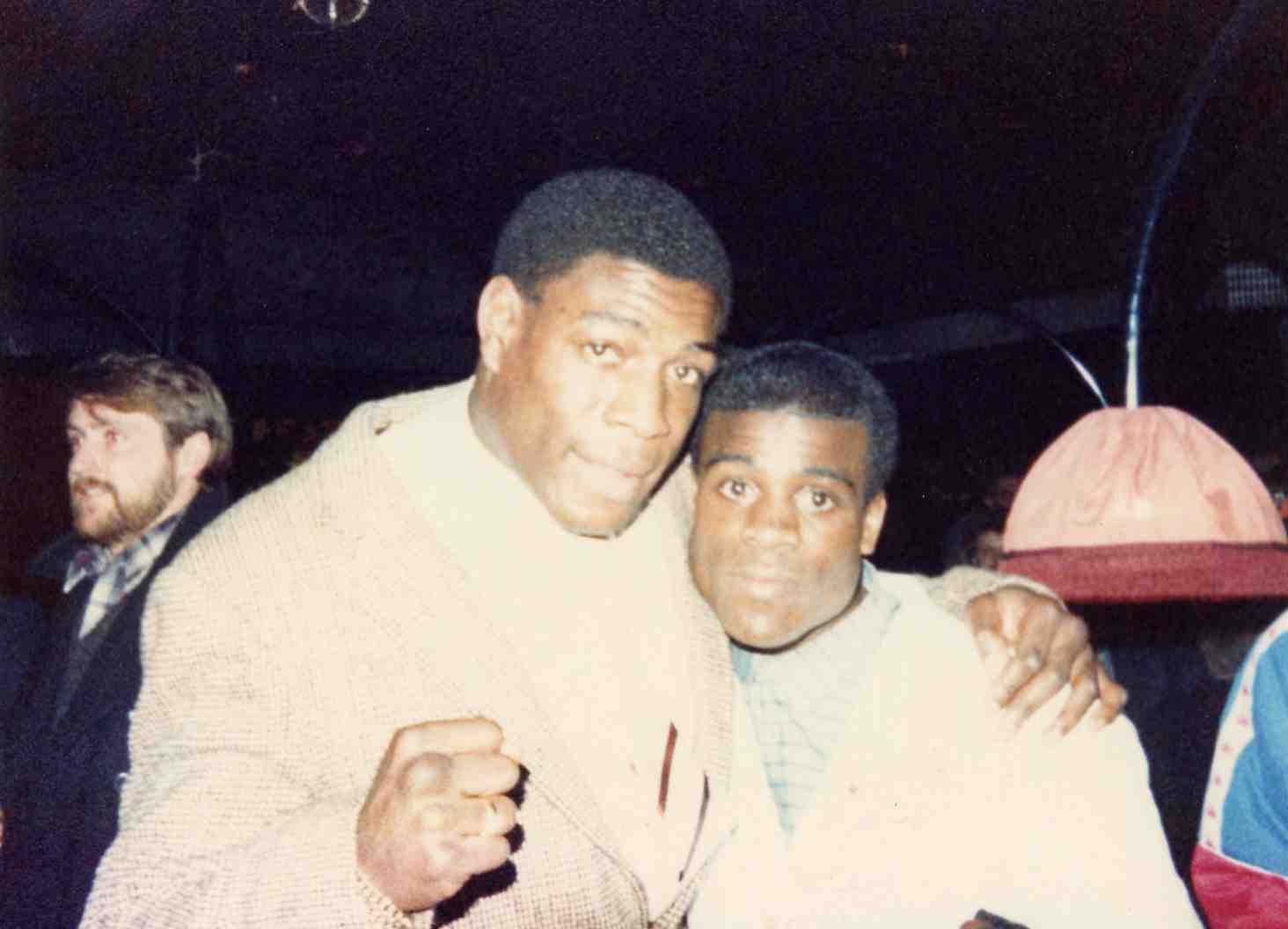
Frank Bruno, boxer

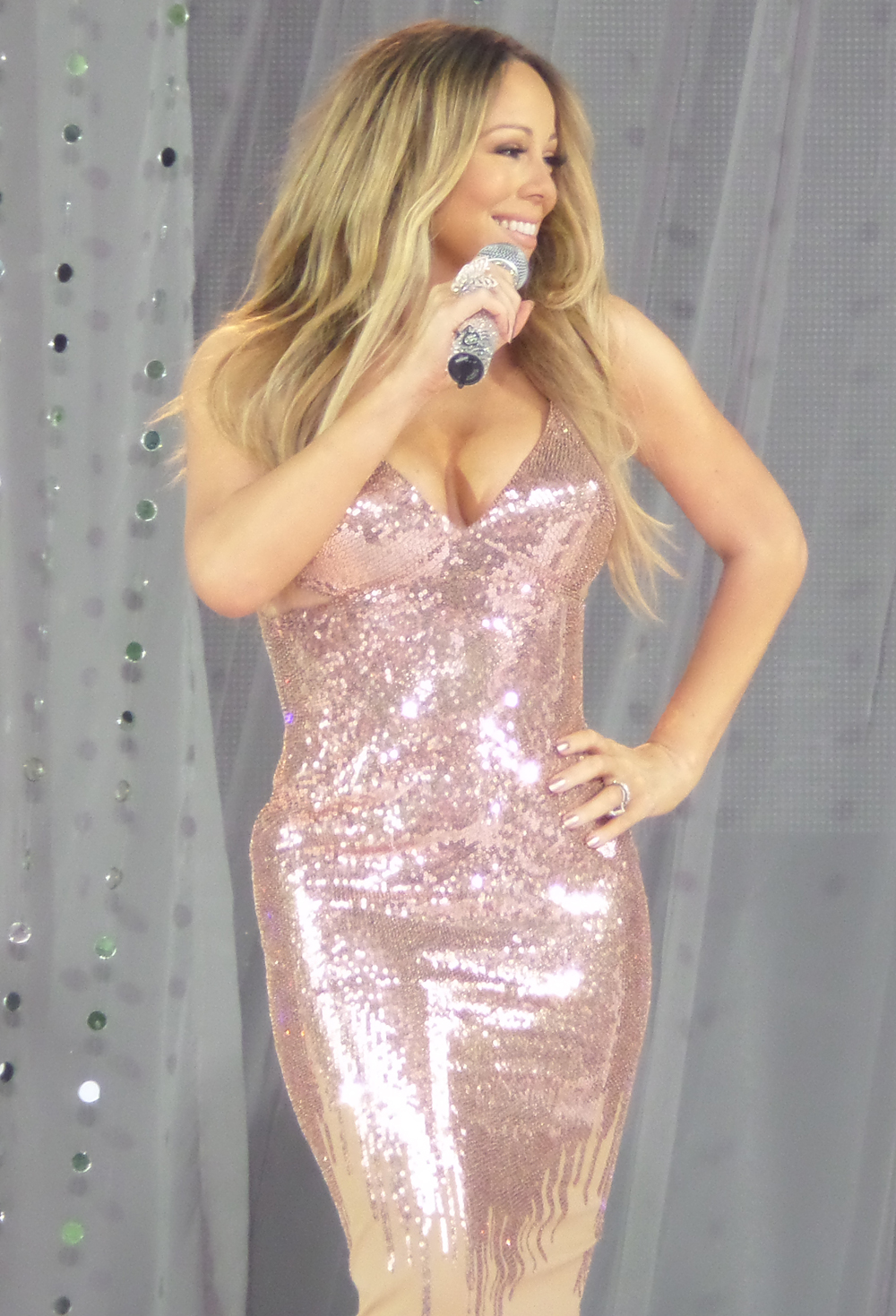
Mariah Carey, singer-songwriter

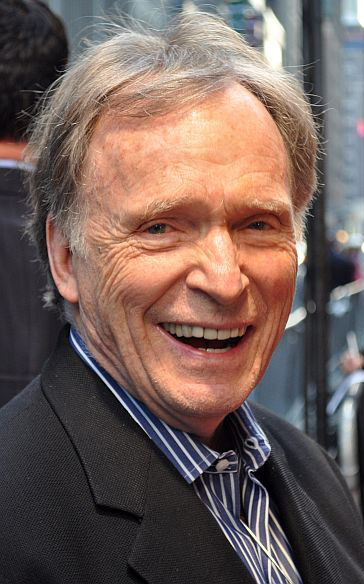
Dick Cavett, comedian

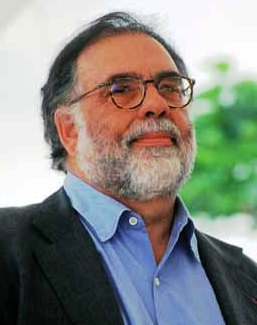
Francis Ford Coppola, film director

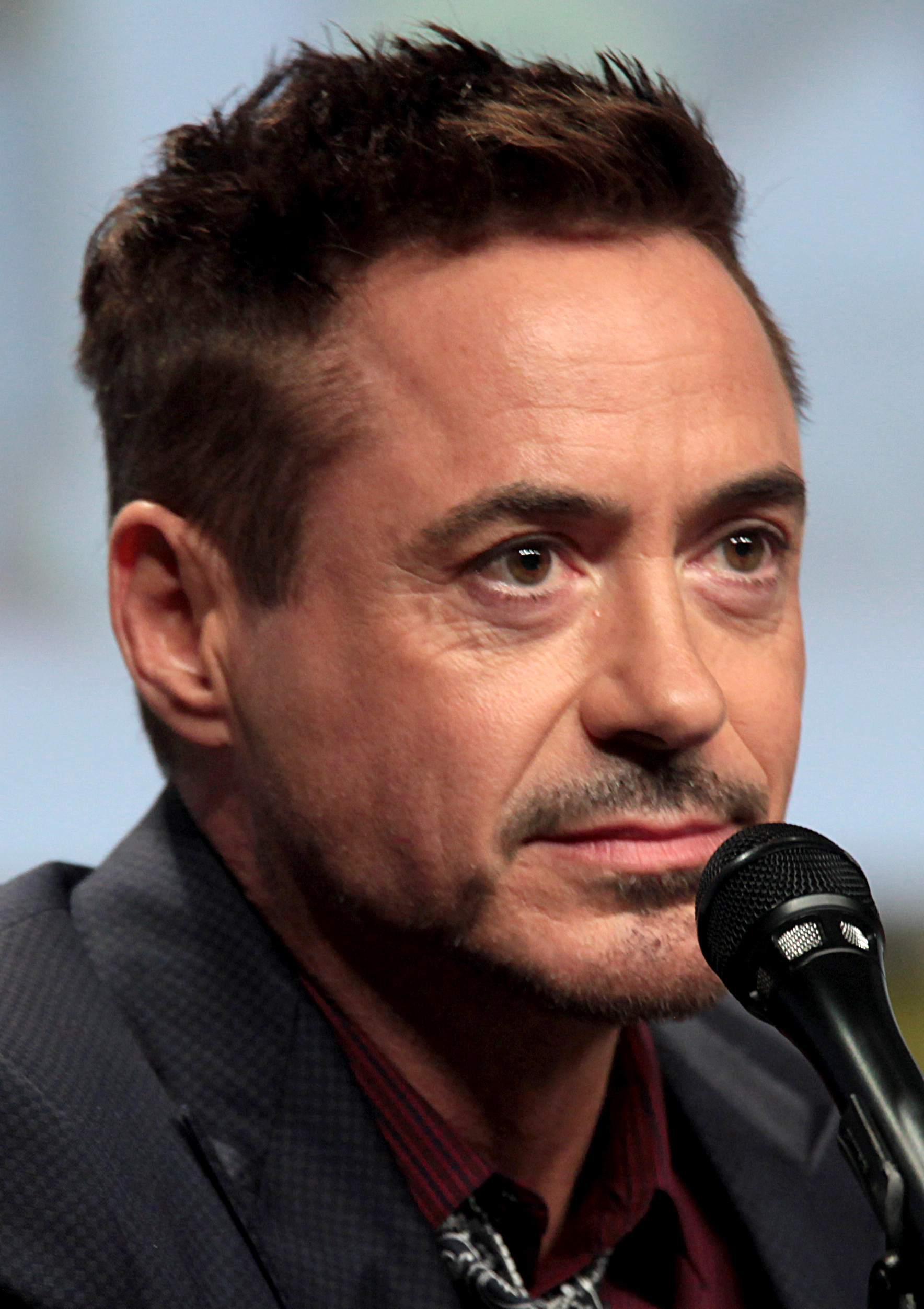
Robert Downey Jr., actor

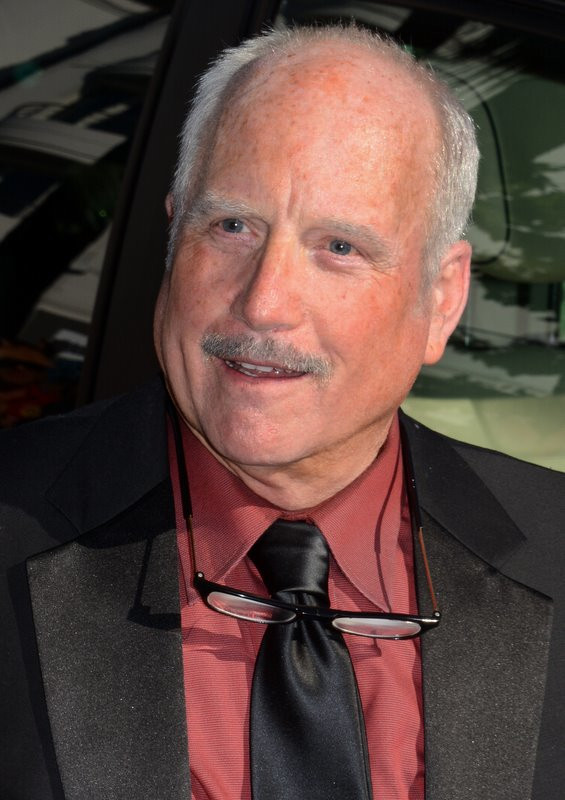
Richard Dreyfuss, actor

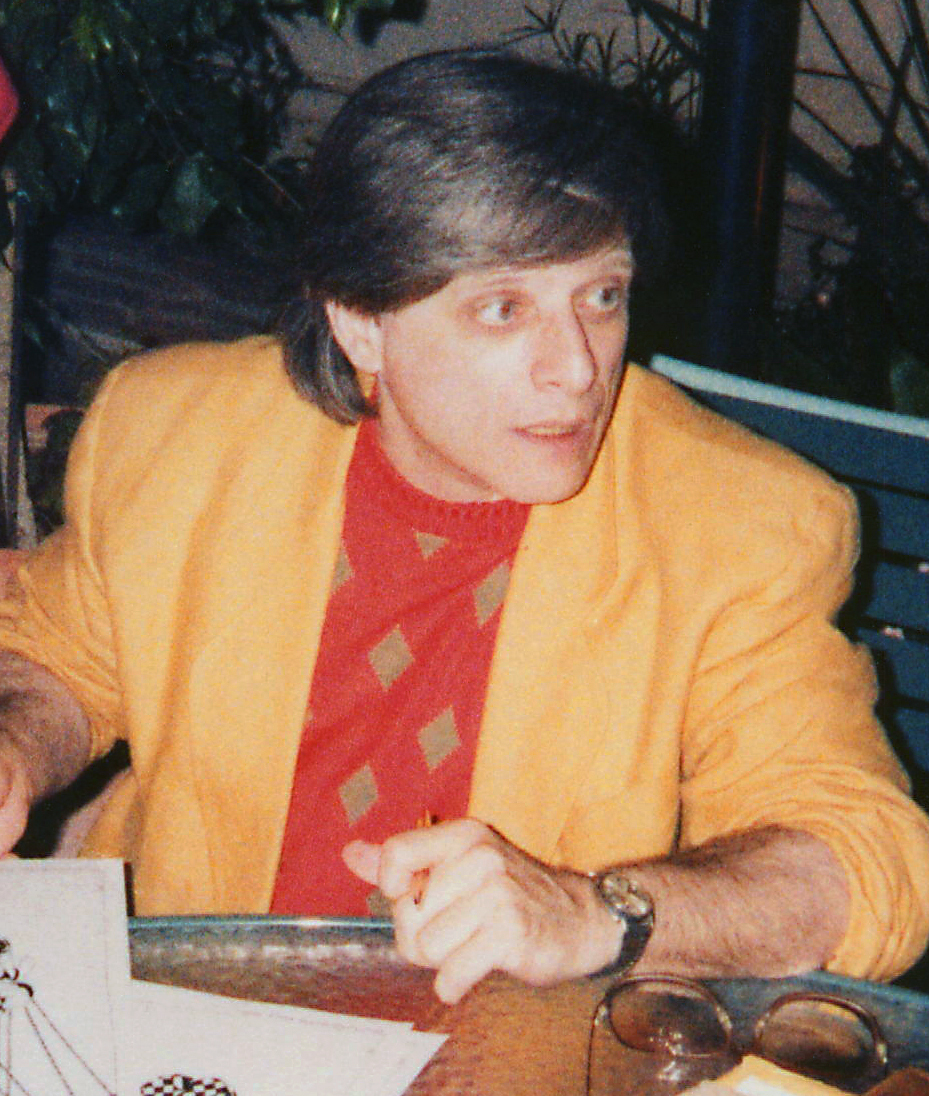
Harlan Ellison, speculative writer

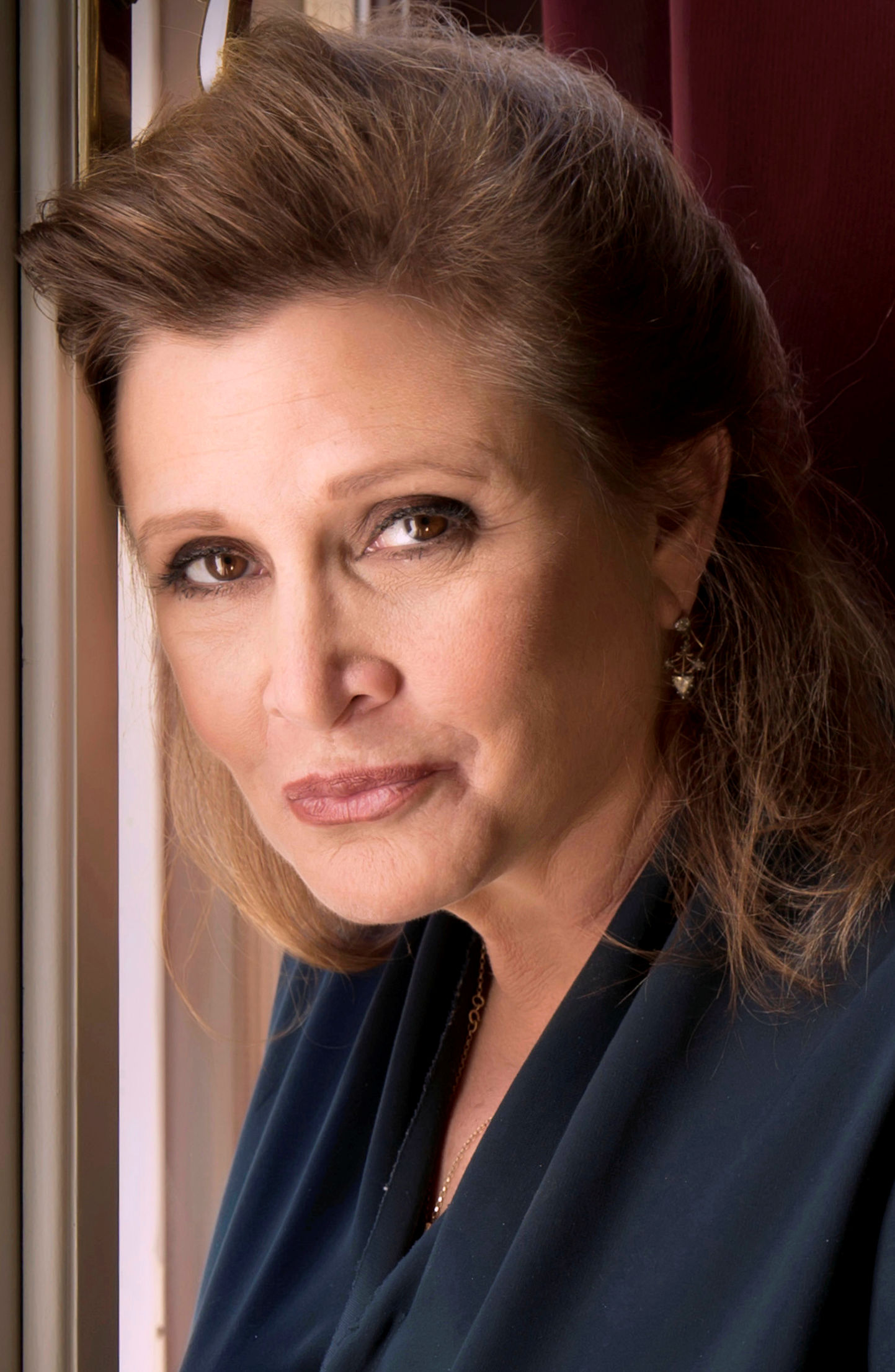
Carrie Fisher, actress and writer

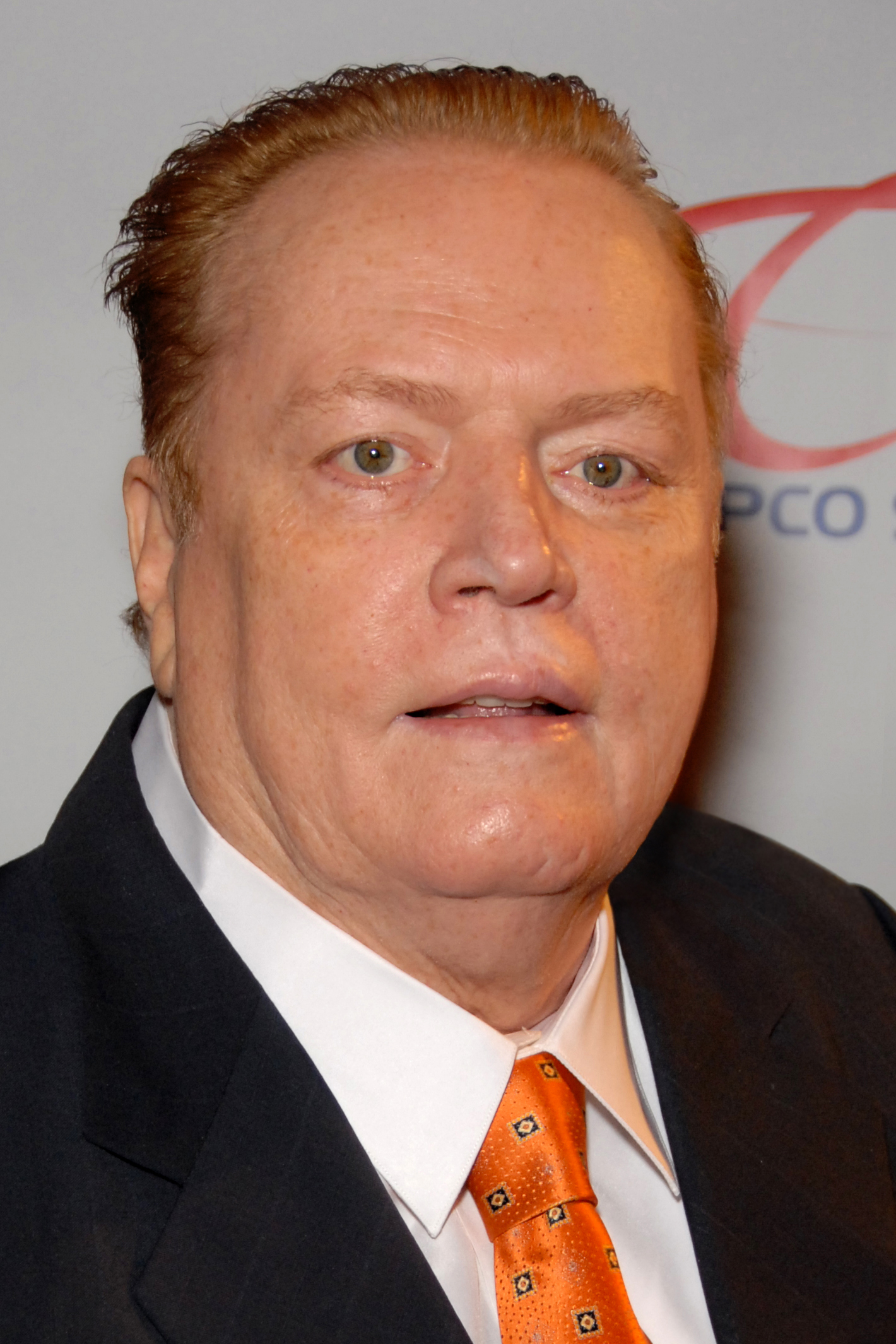
Larry Flynt, publisher

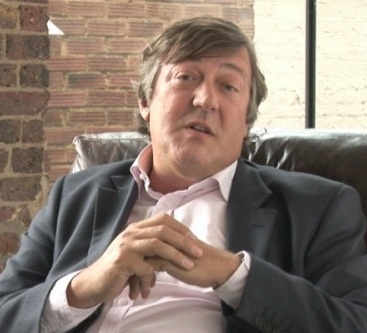
Stephen Fry, actor

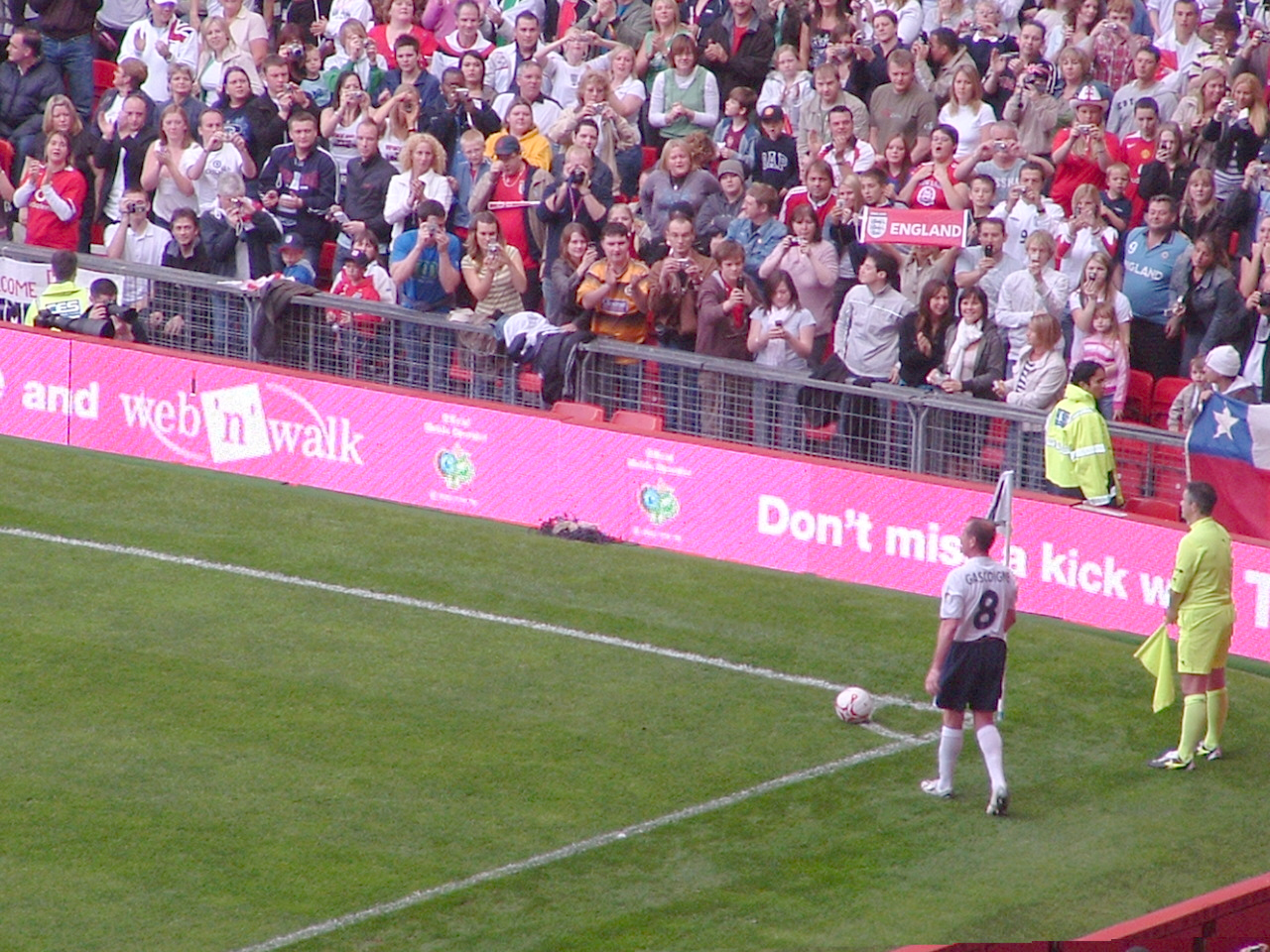
Paul Gascoigne, footballer

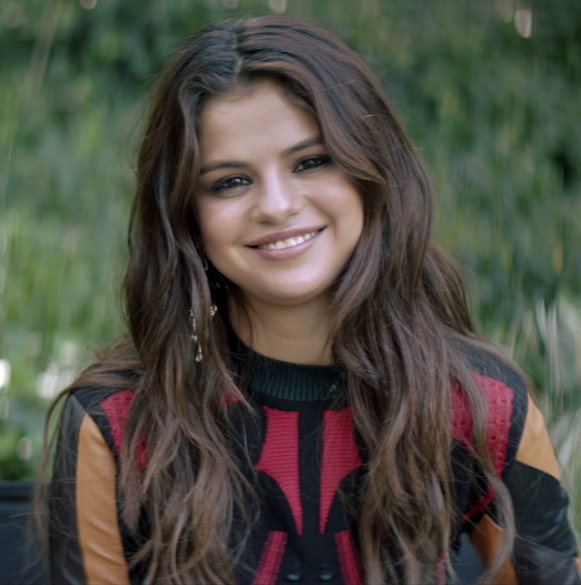
Selena Gomez, singer and actress

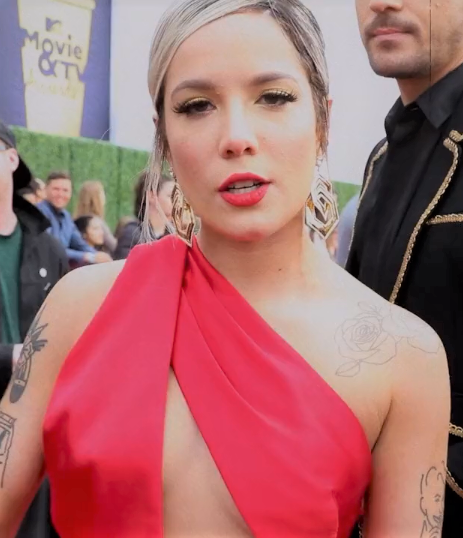
Halsey, singer and songwriter

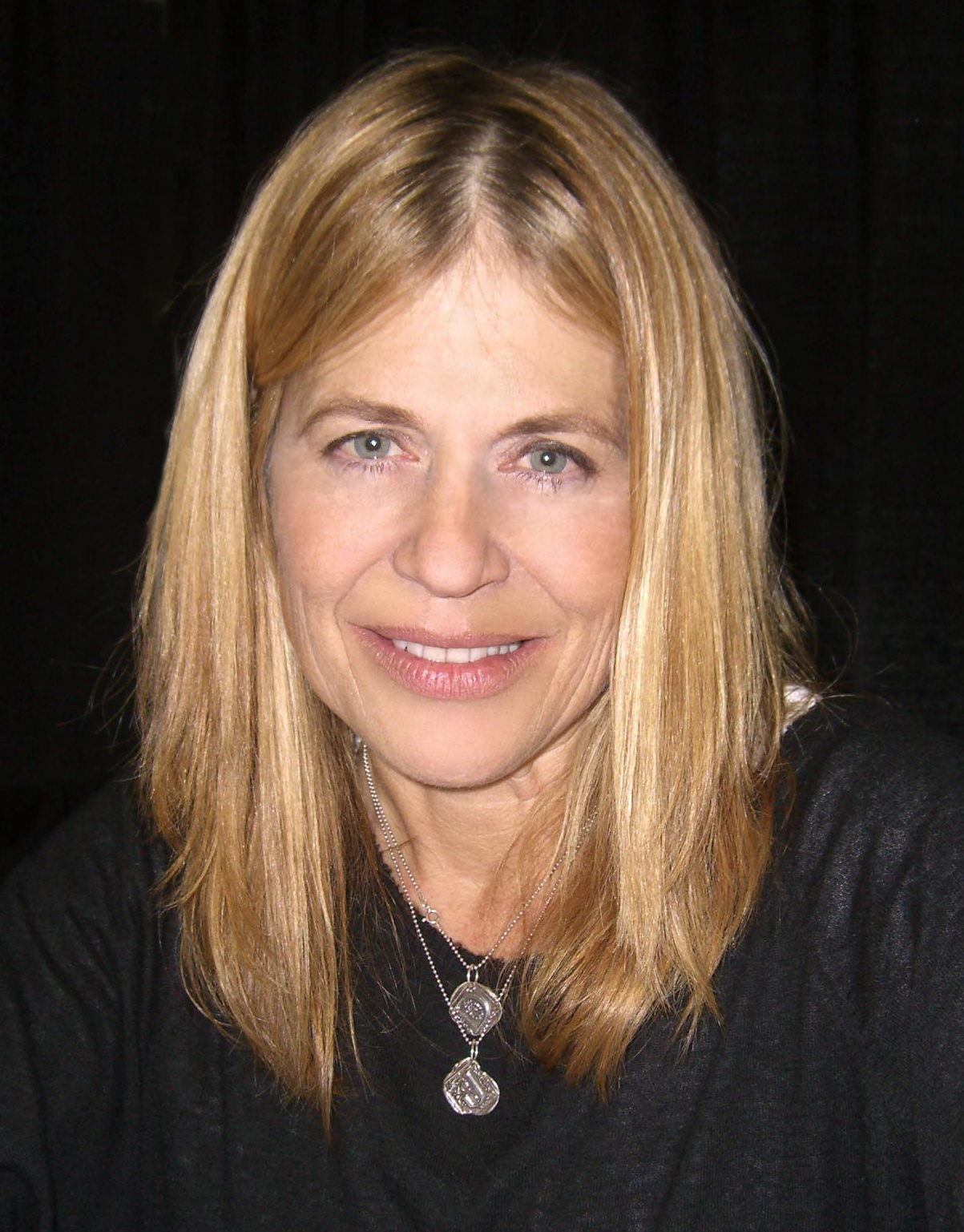
Linda Hamilton, actress

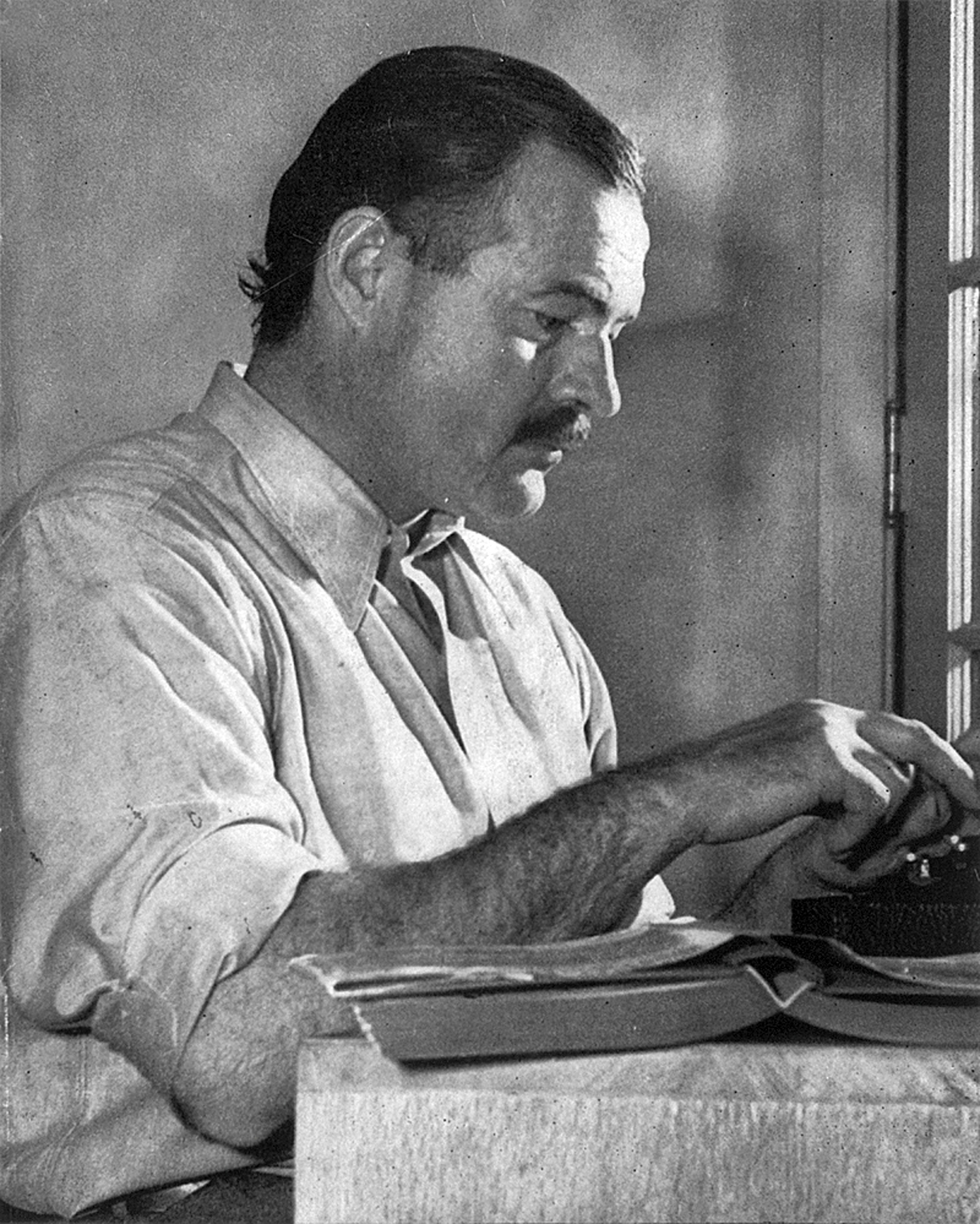
Ernest Hemingway, writer

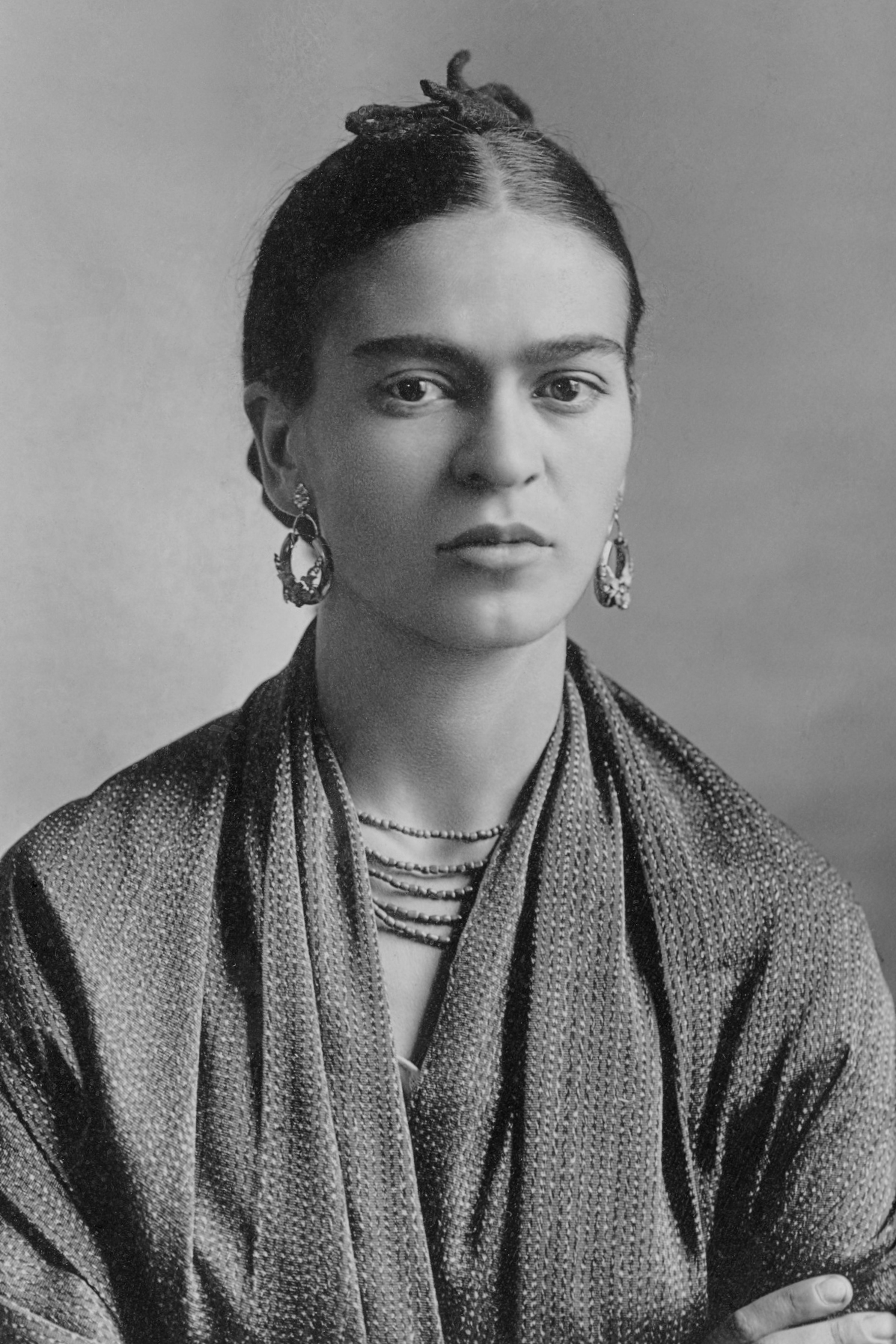
Frida Kahlo, painter

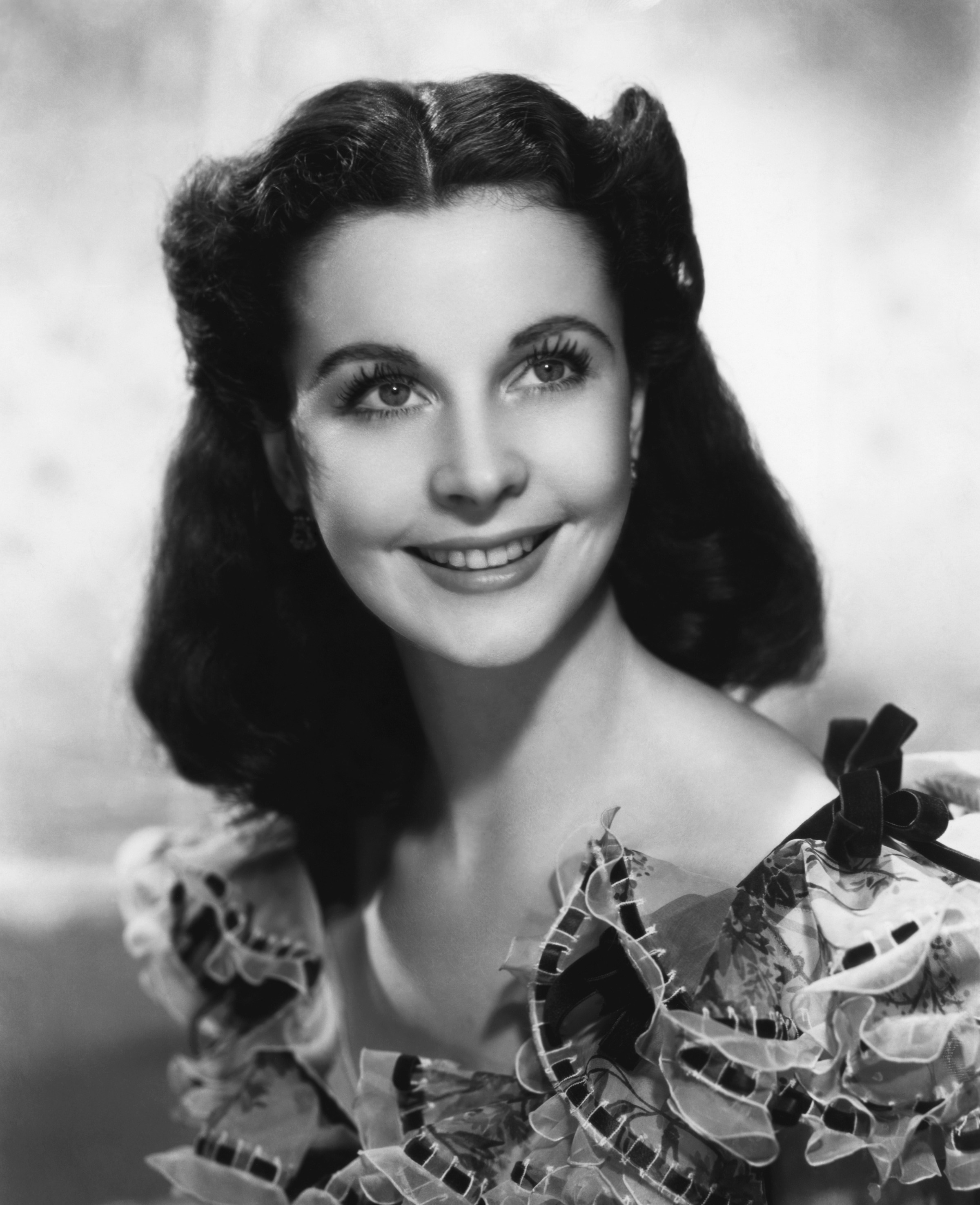
Vivien Leigh, actress

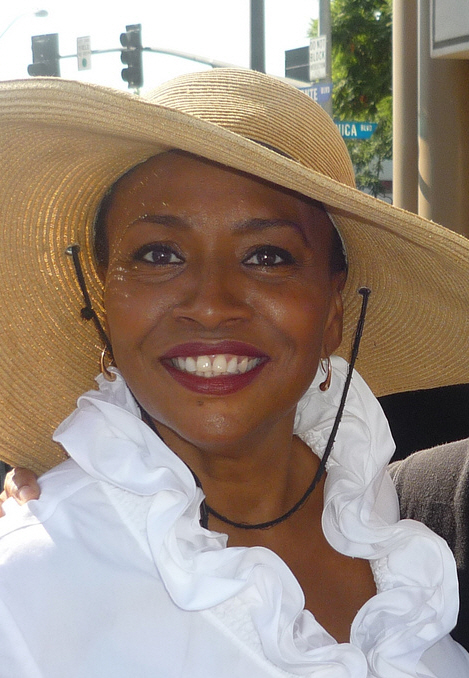
Jenifer Lewis, actress

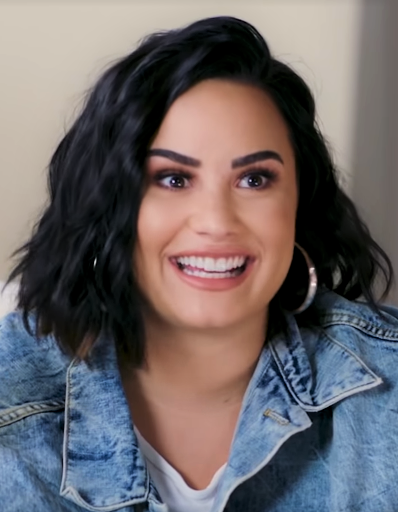
Demi Lovato, singer and actress

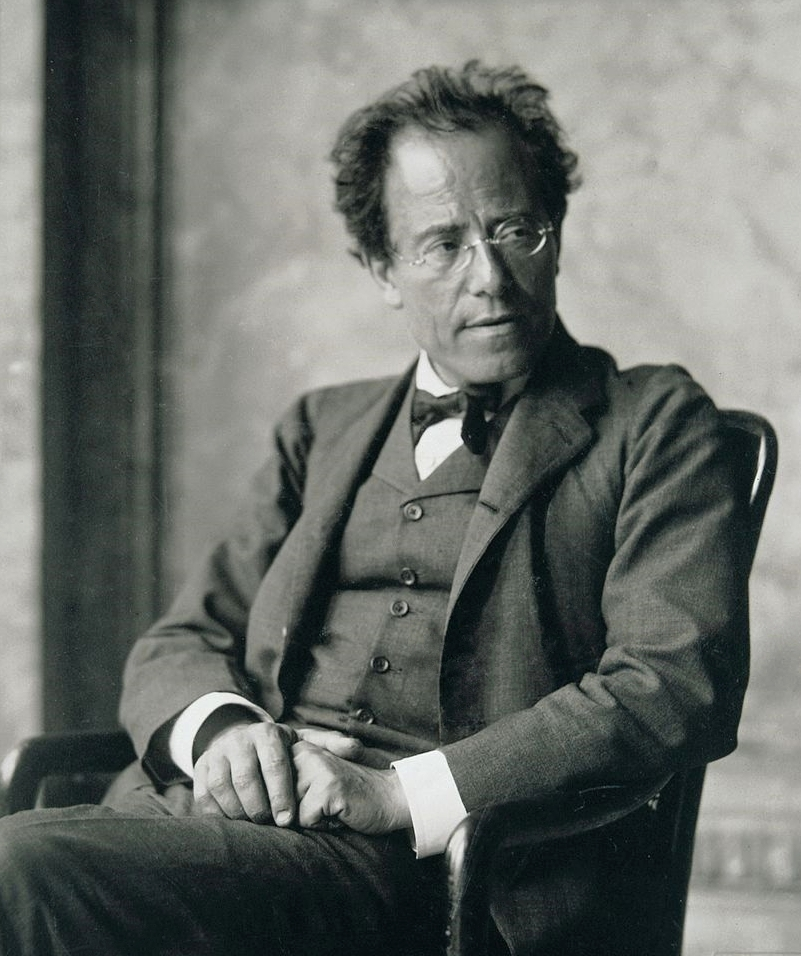
Gustav Mahler, composer

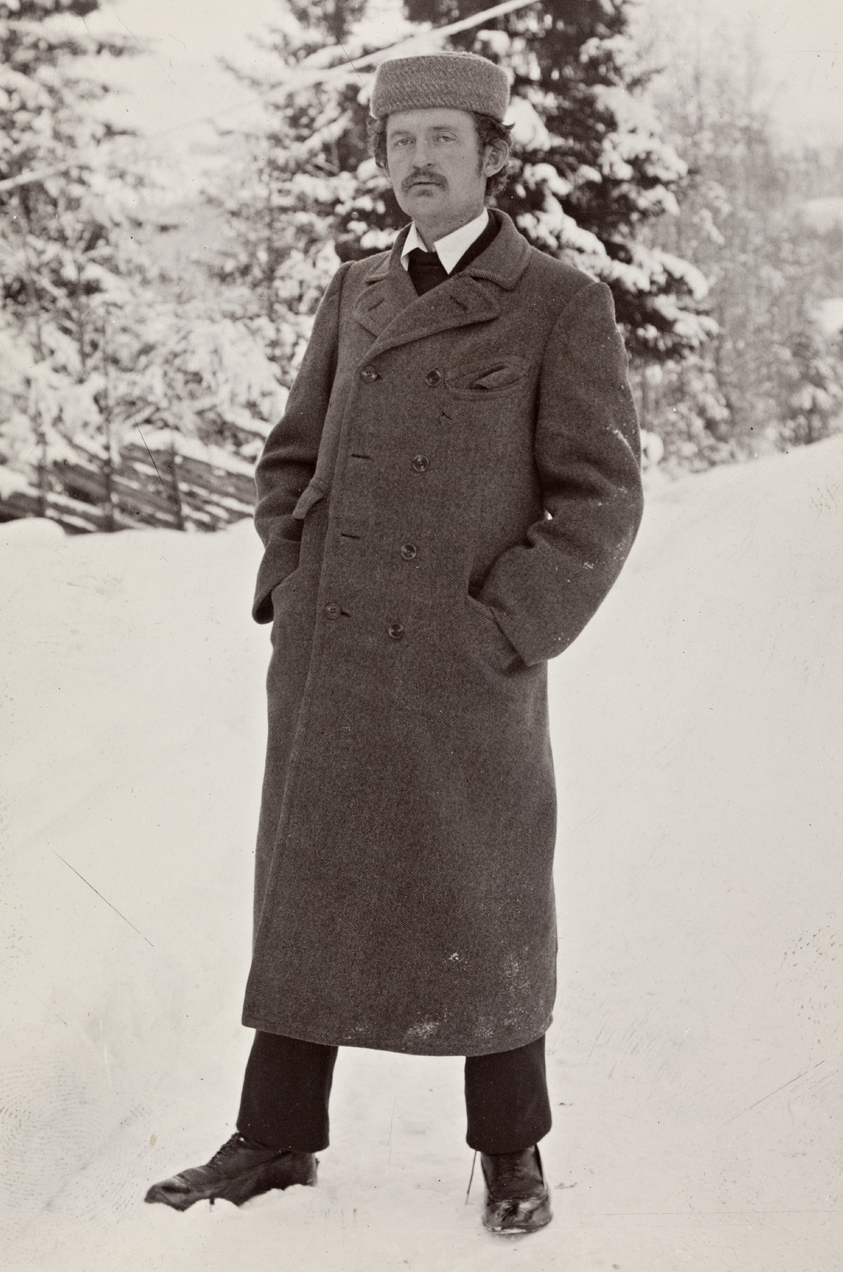
Edvard Munch, painter

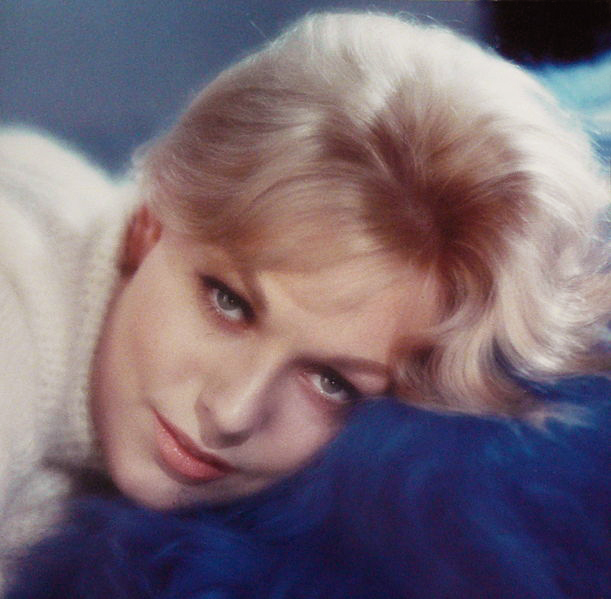
Kim Novak, actress

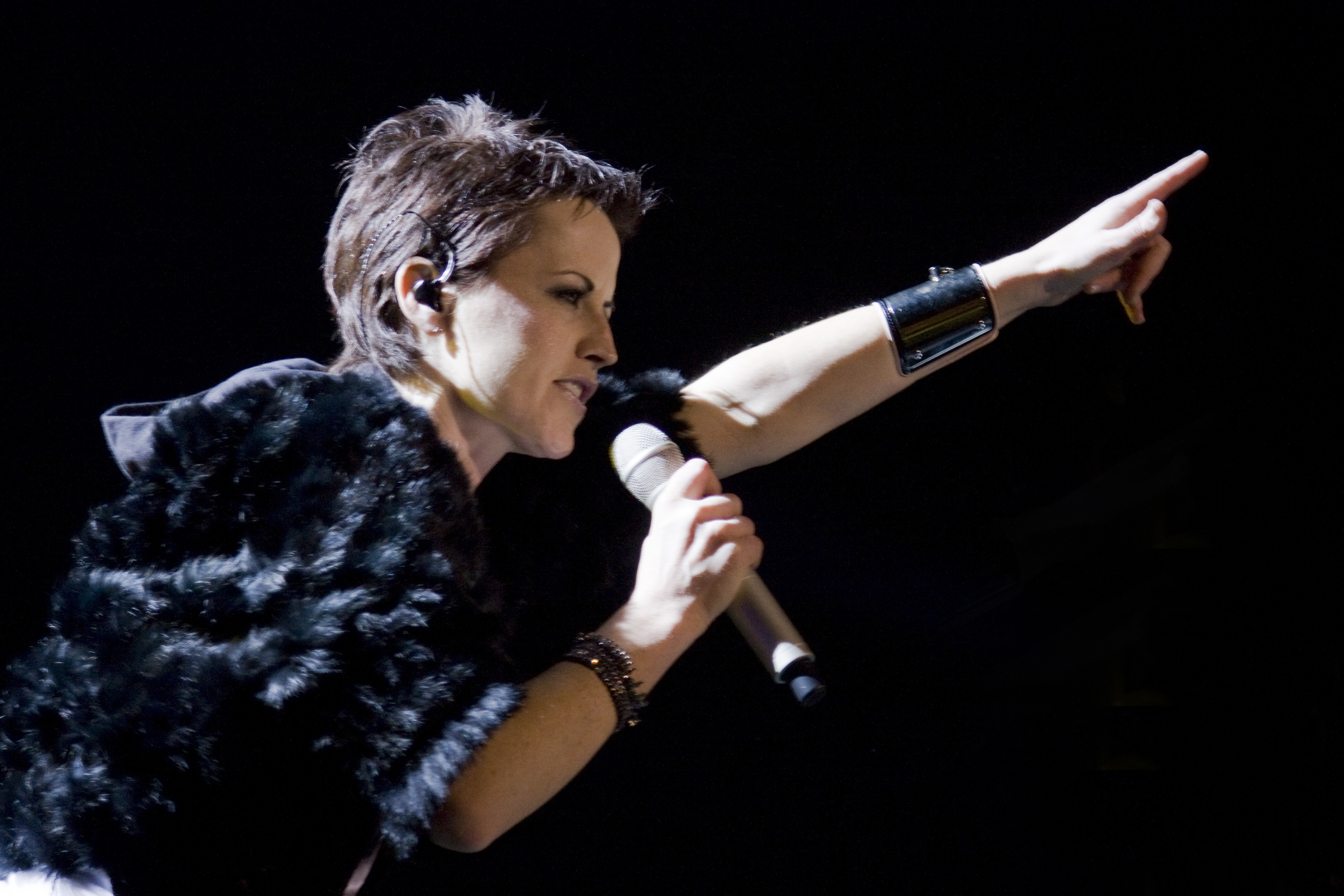
Dolores O'Riordan, musician

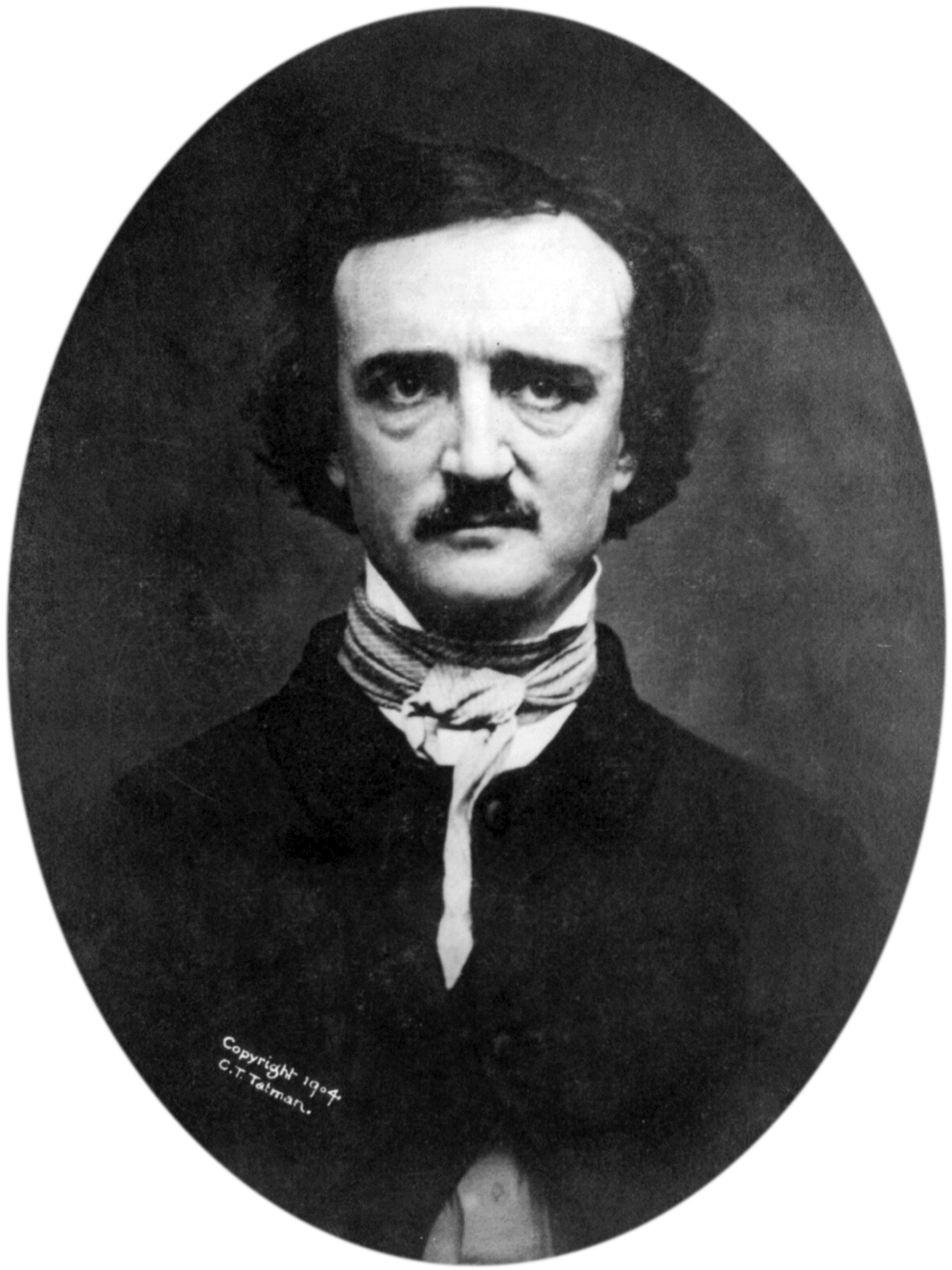
Edgar Allan Poe, writer

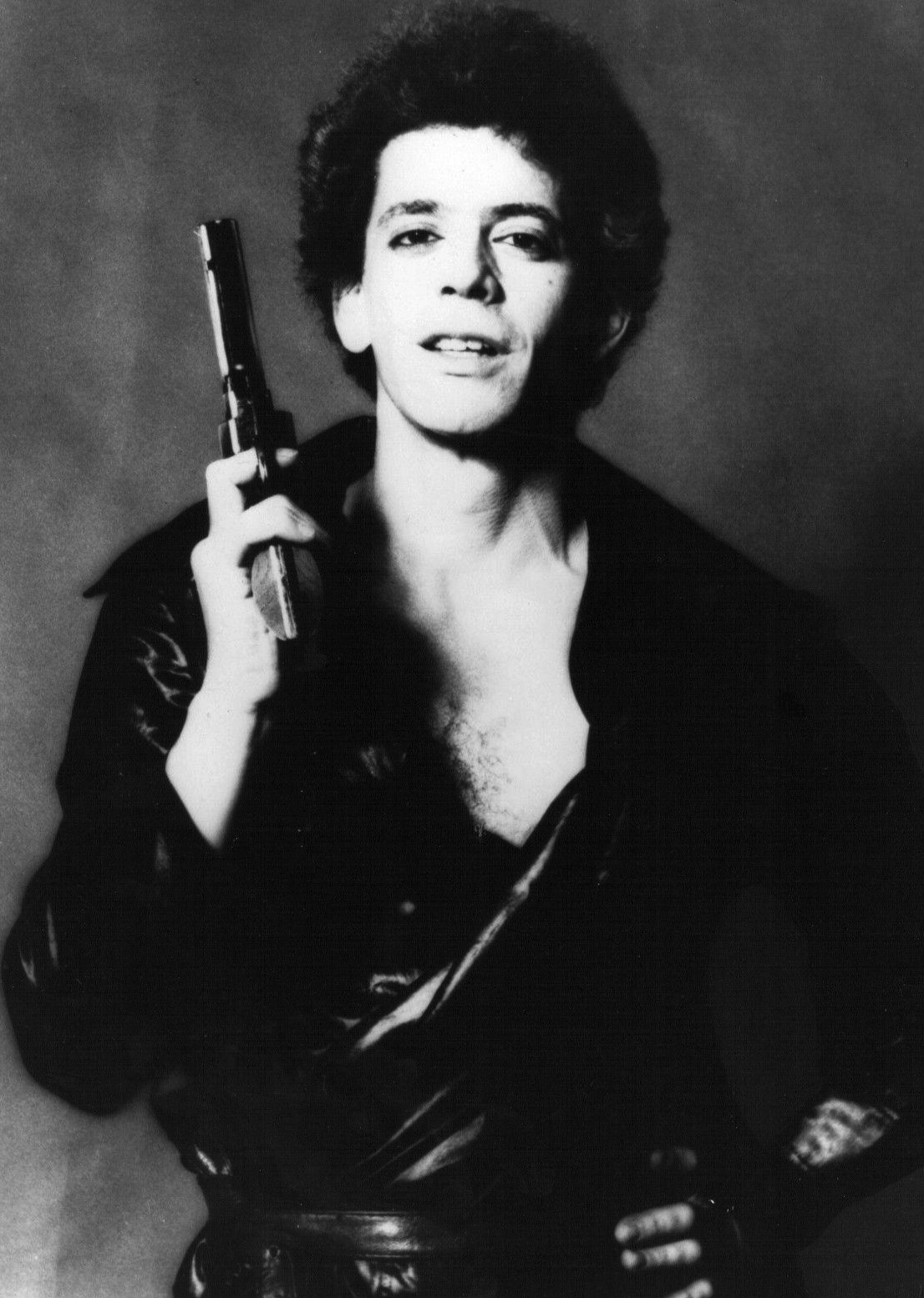
Lou Reed, musician

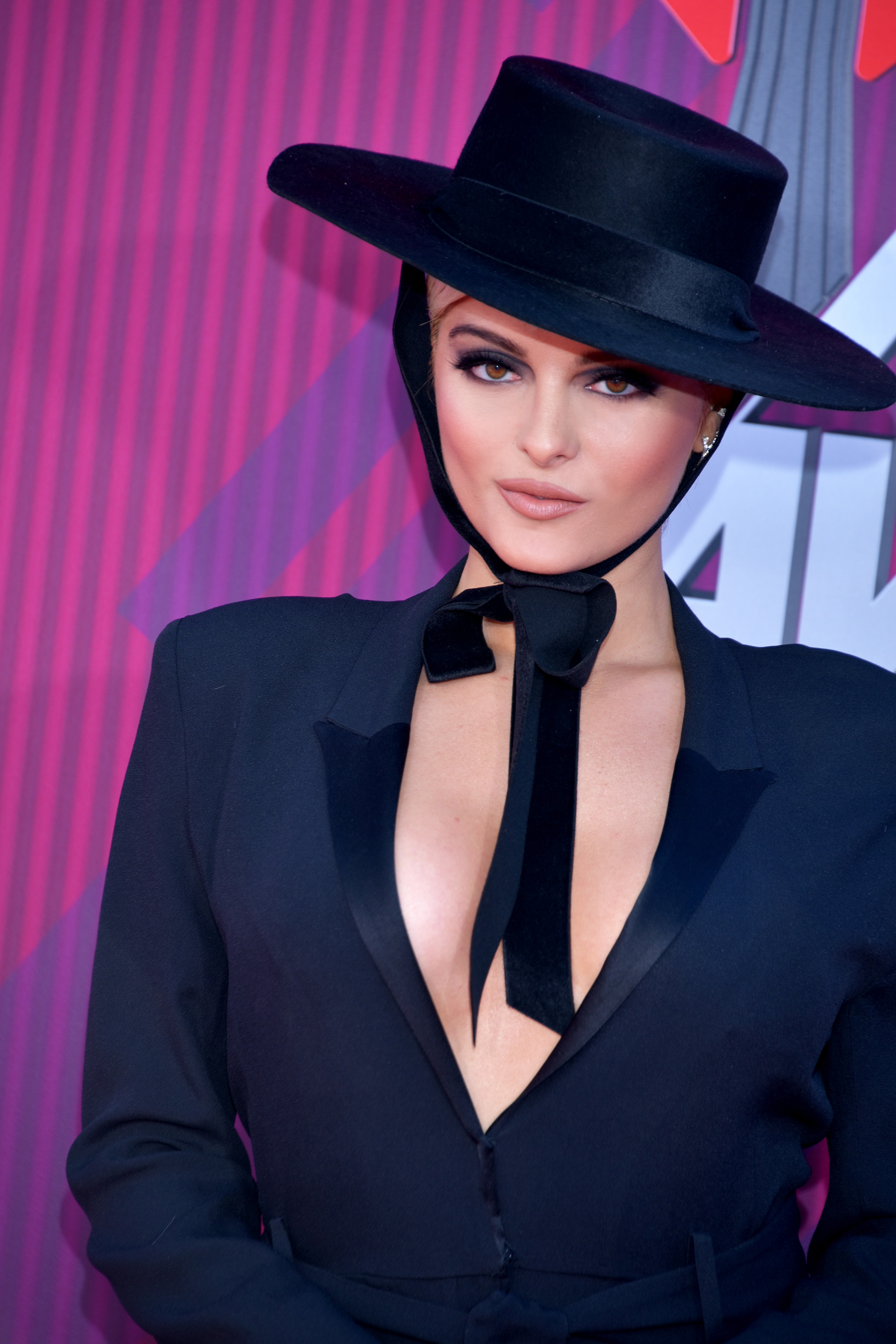
Bebe Rexha, musician

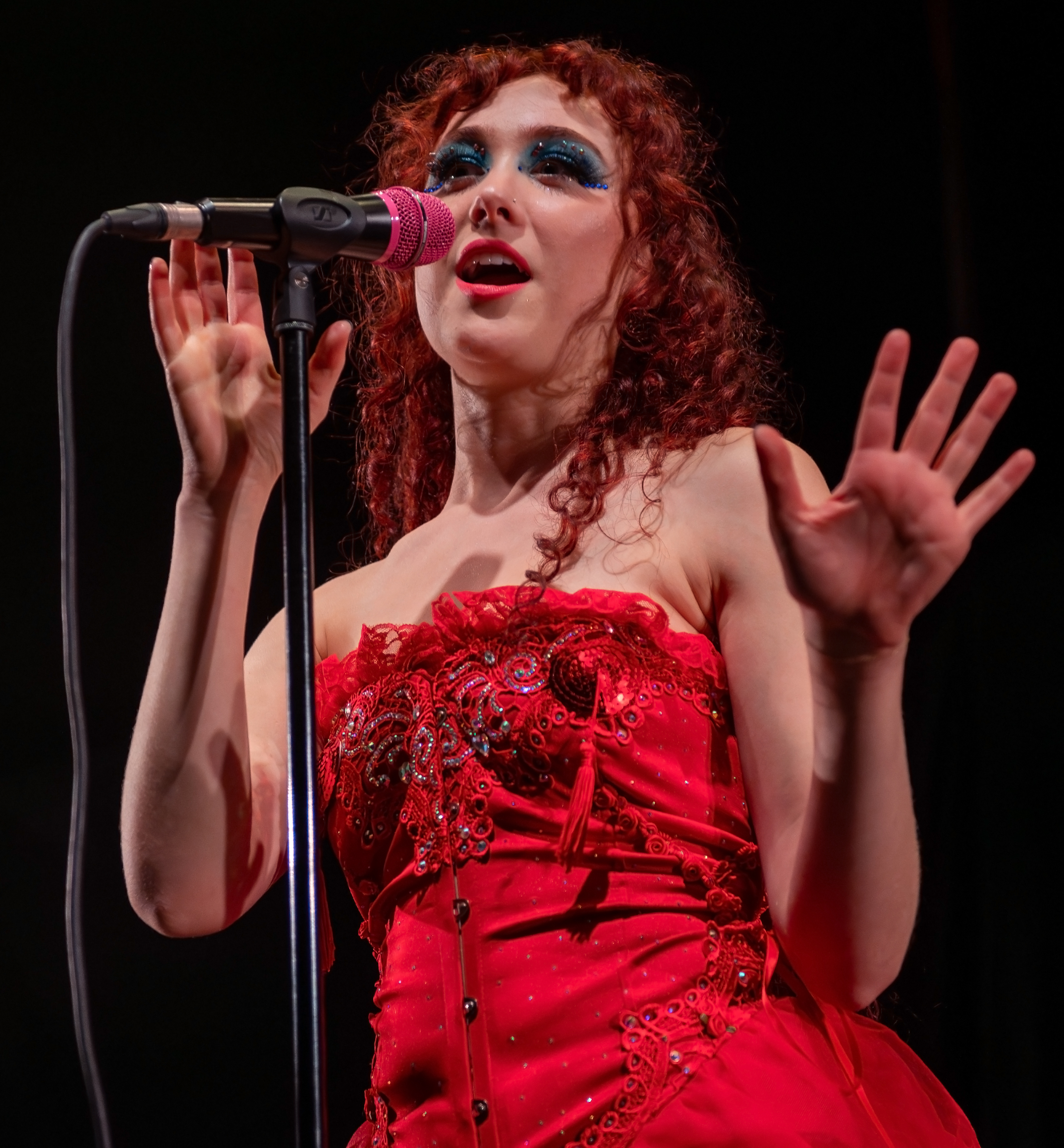
Chappell Roan, singer-songwriter

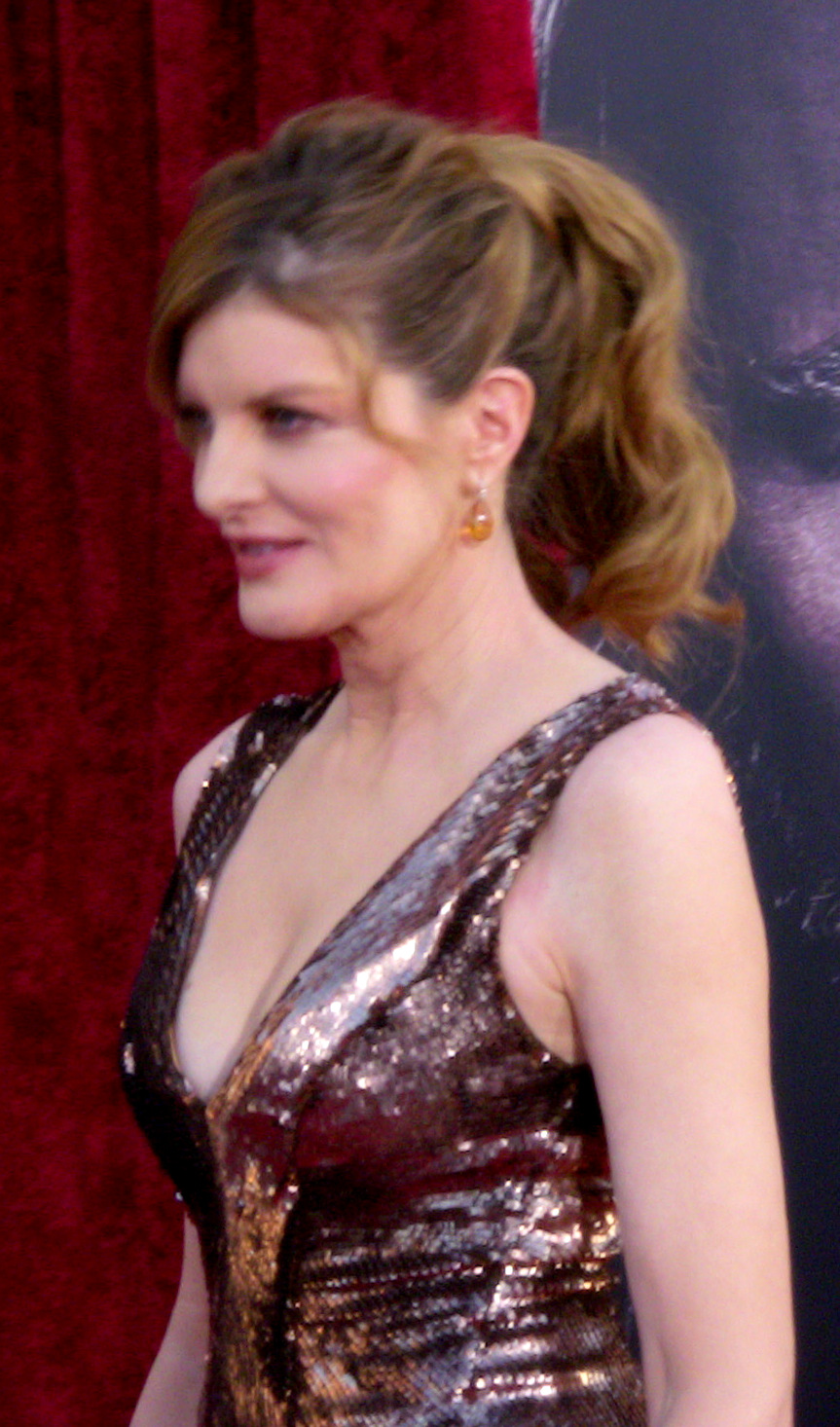
Rene Russo, actress

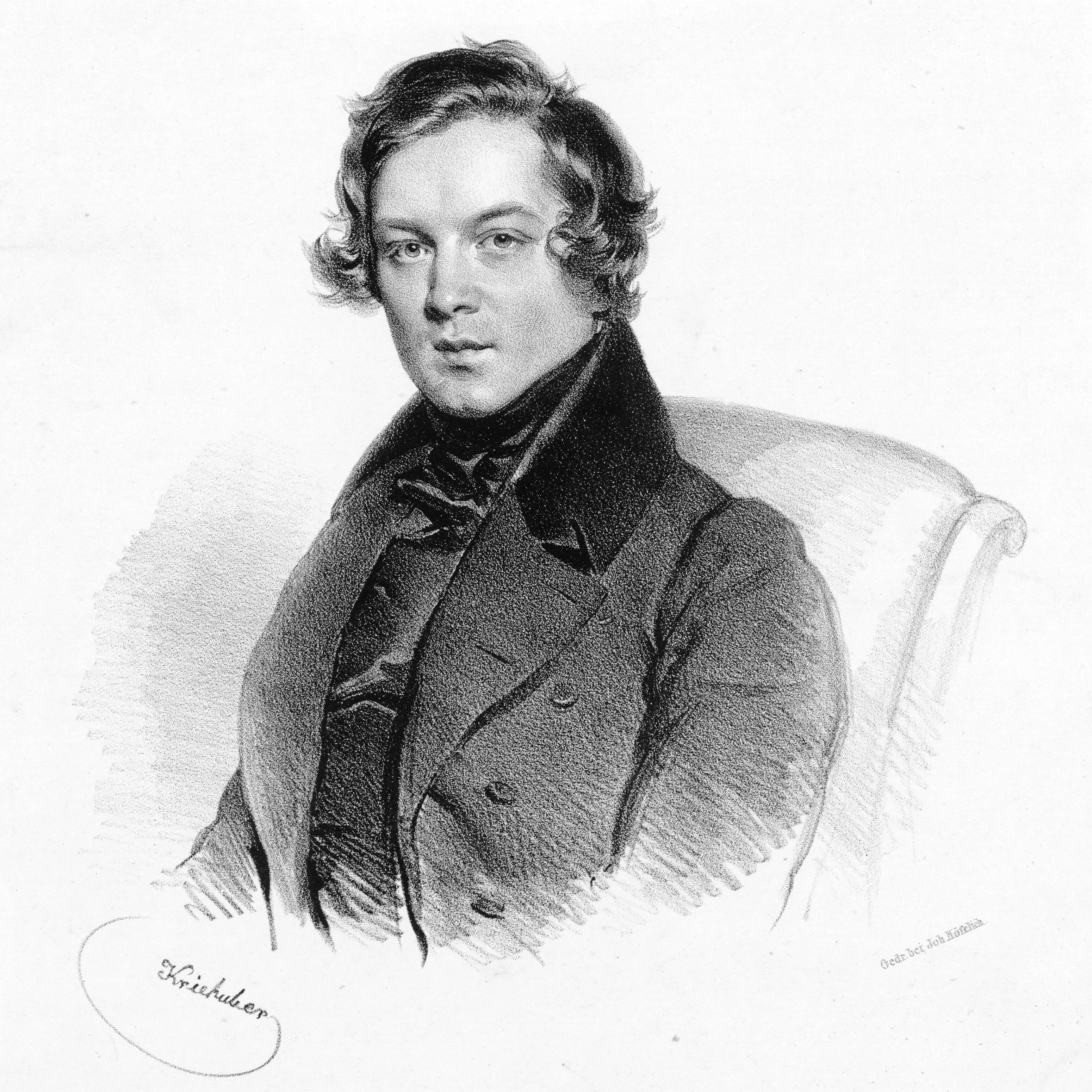
Robert Schumann, composer

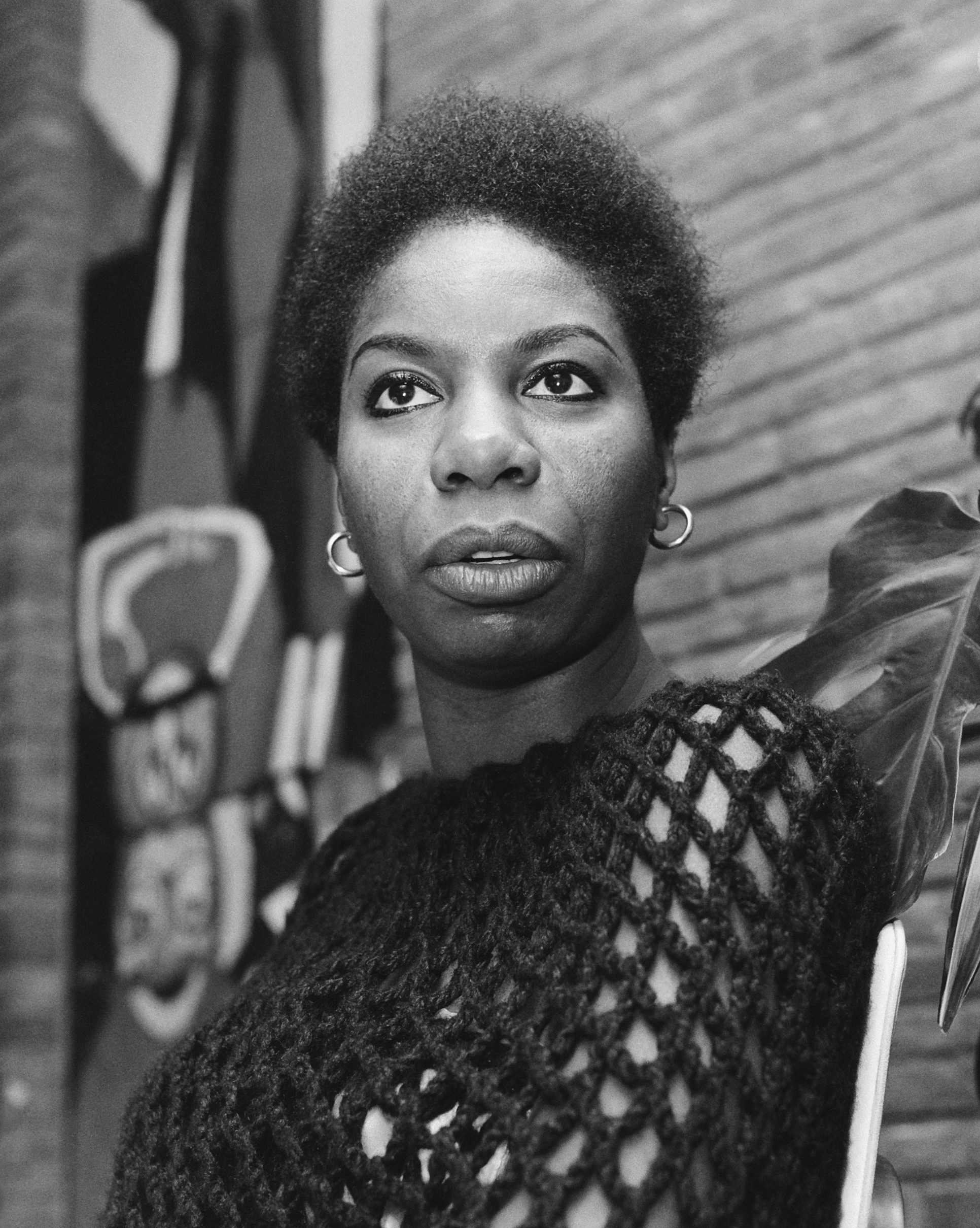
Nina Simone, singer

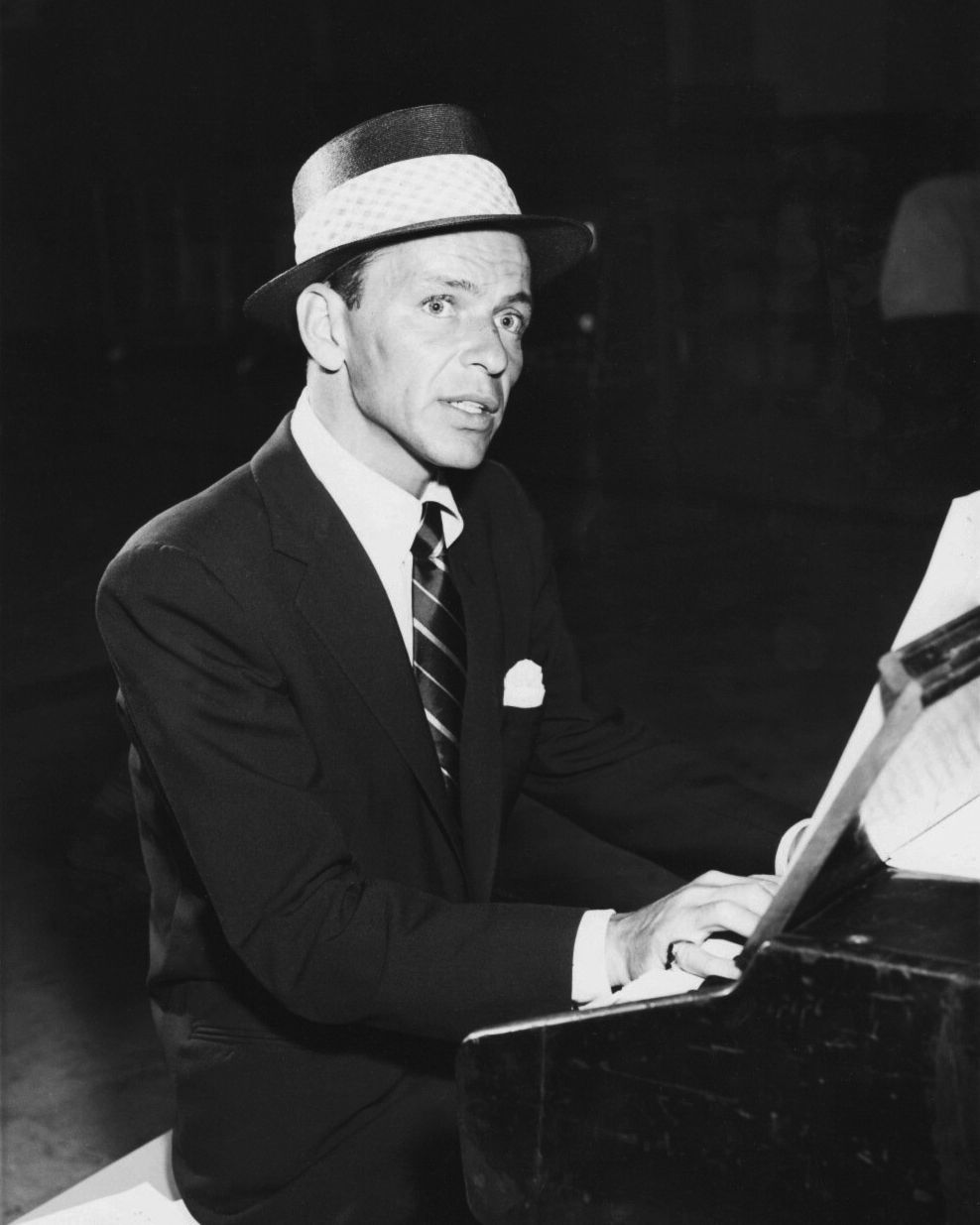
Frank Sinatra, singer

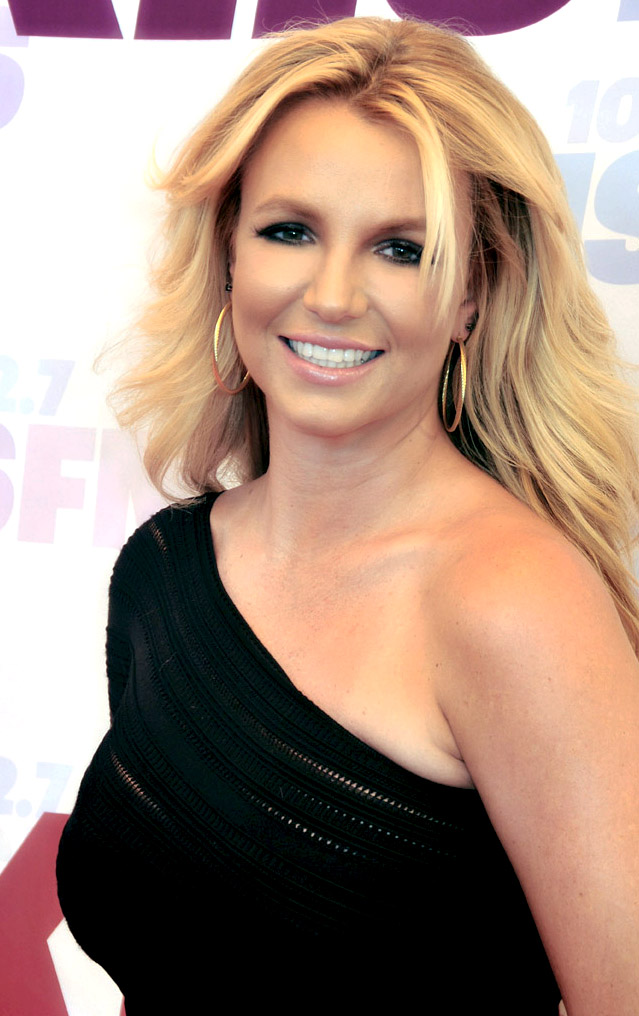
Britney Spears, singer

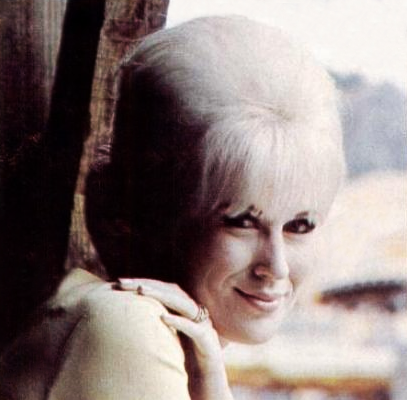
Dusty Springfield, singer

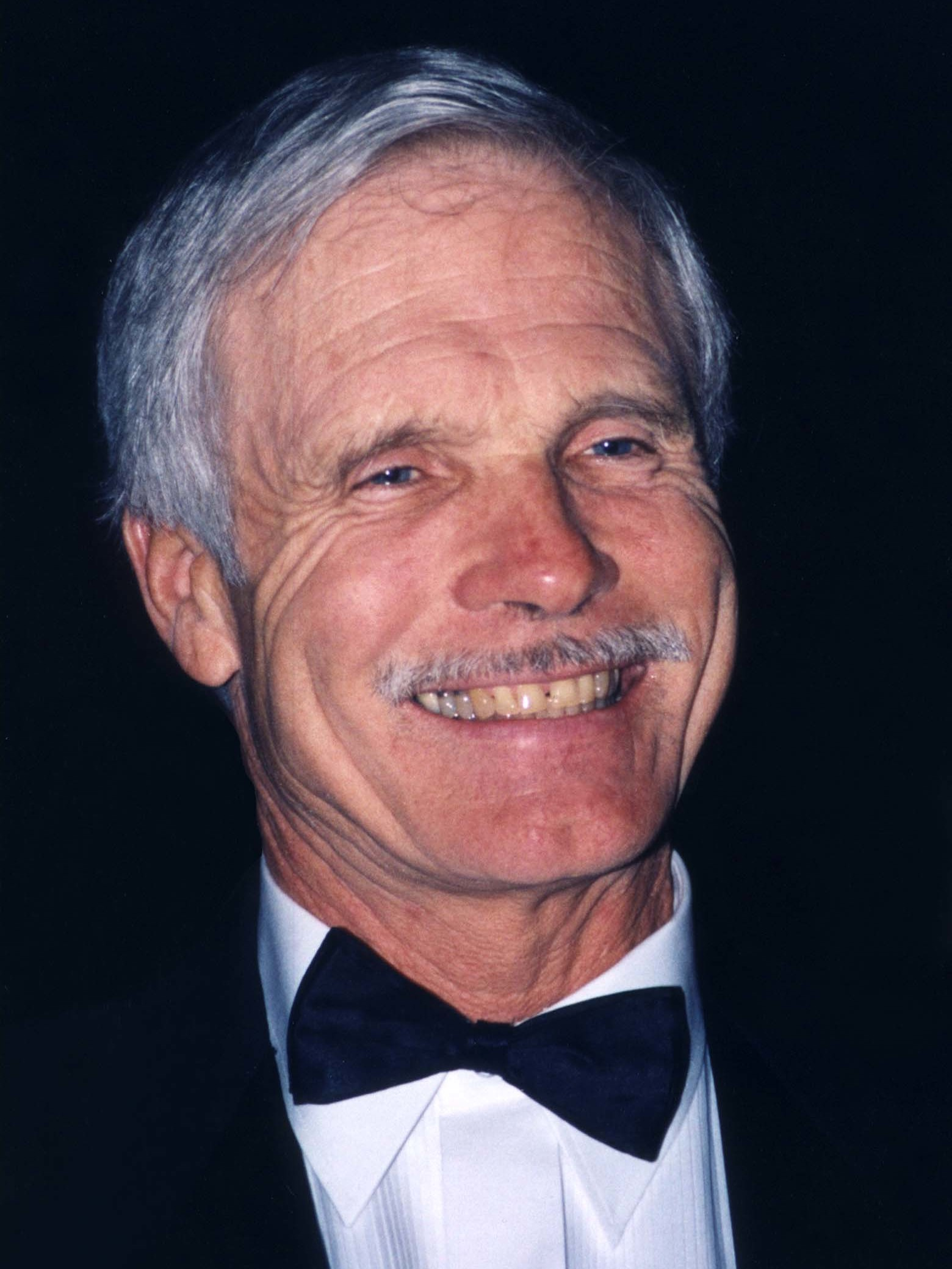
Ted Turner, businessman

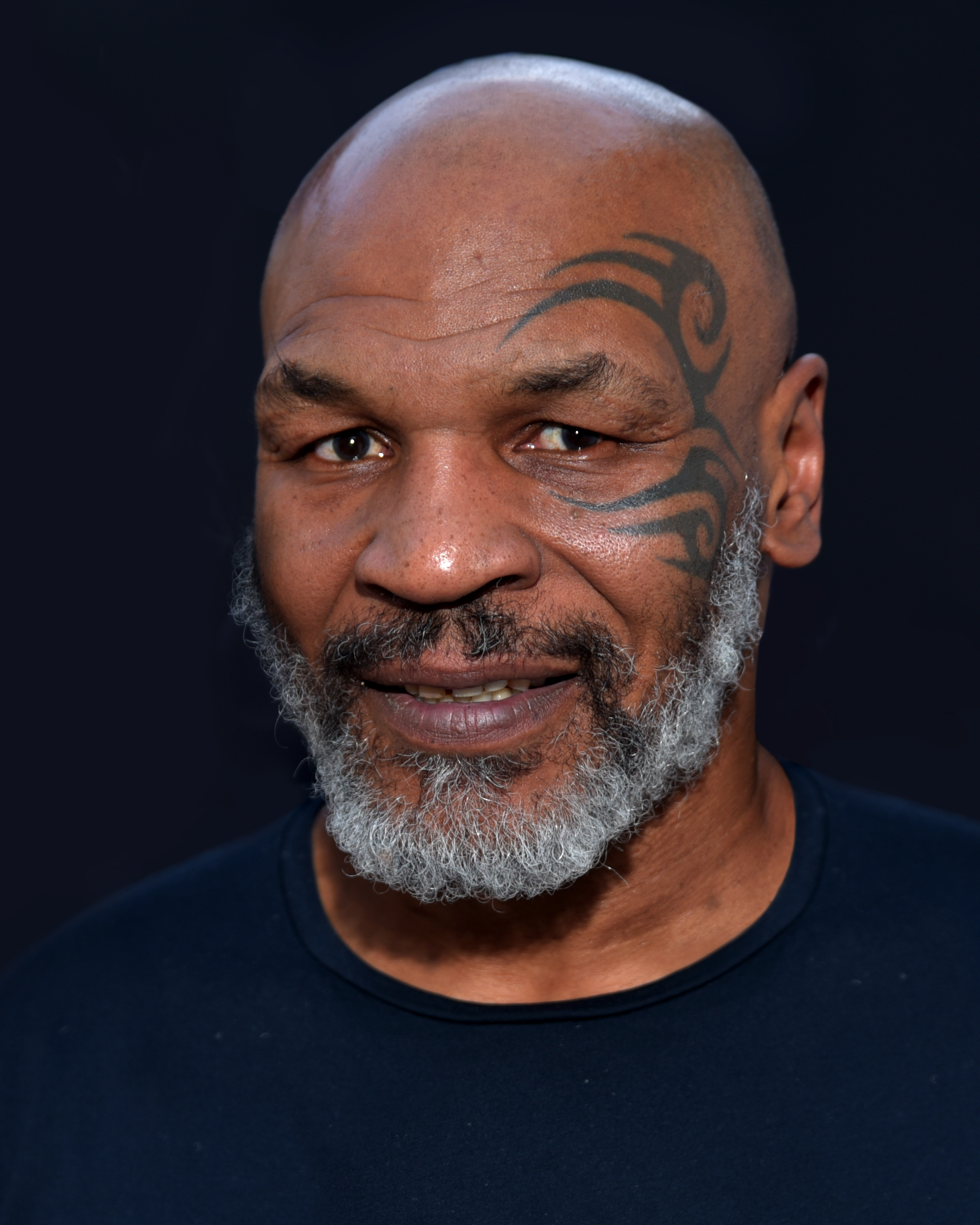
Mike Tyson, boxer

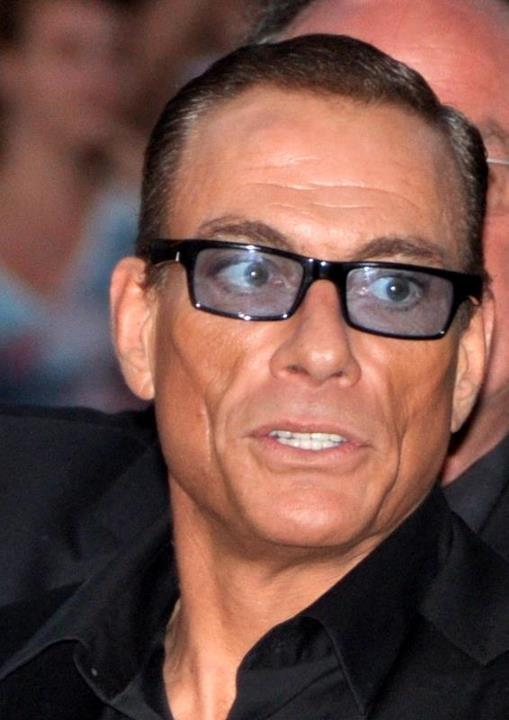
Jean-Claude Van Damme, actor

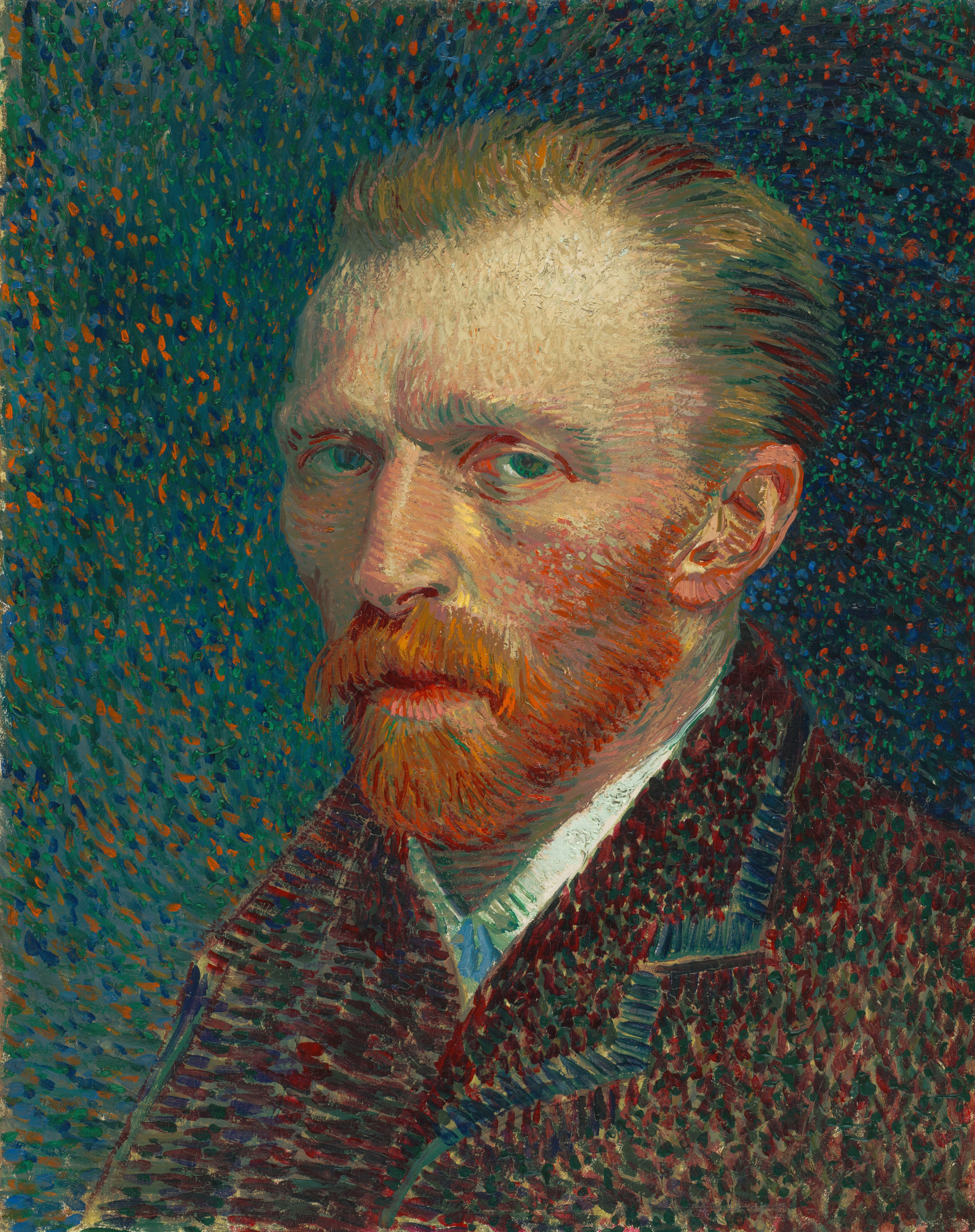
Vincent van Gogh, painter

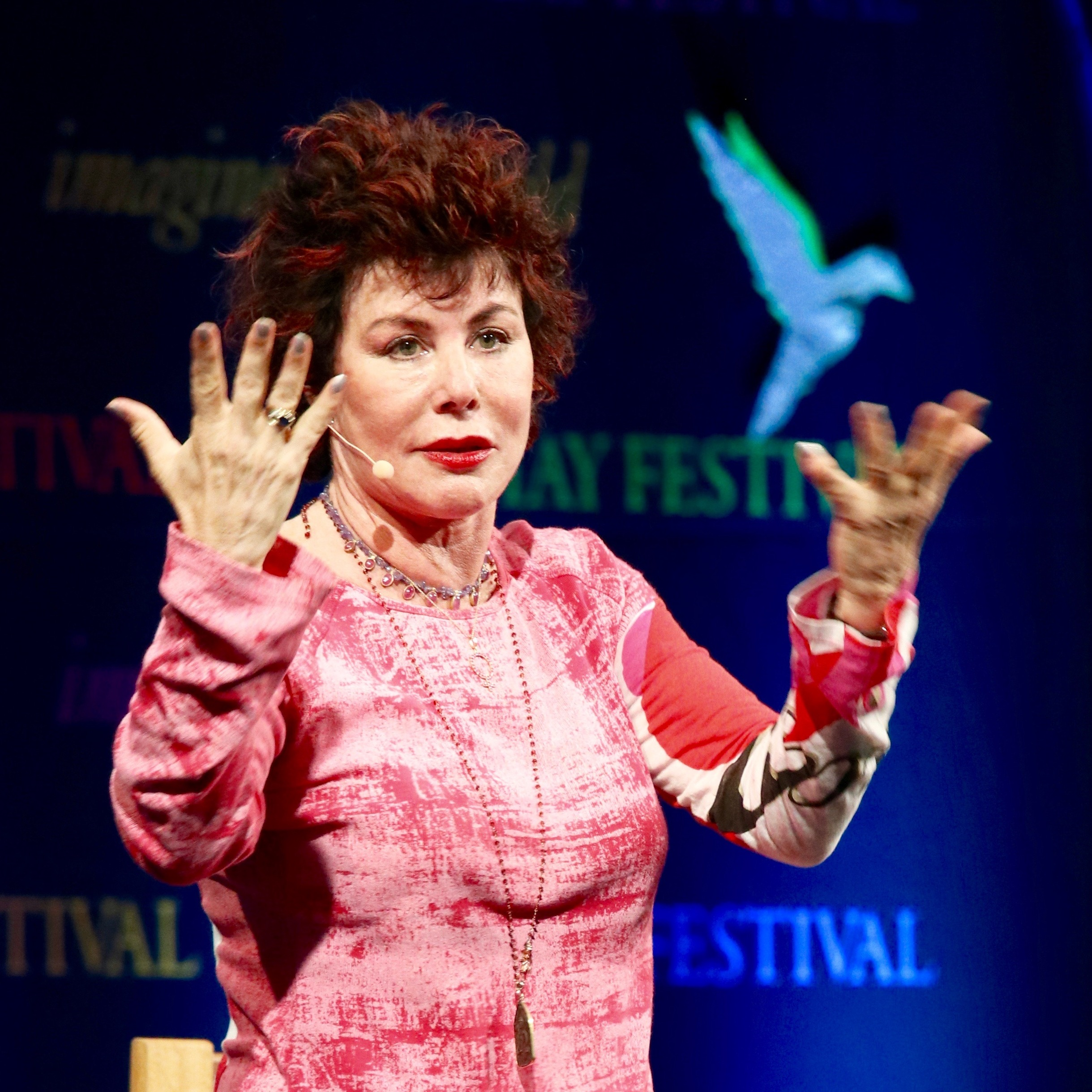
Ruby Wax, actress

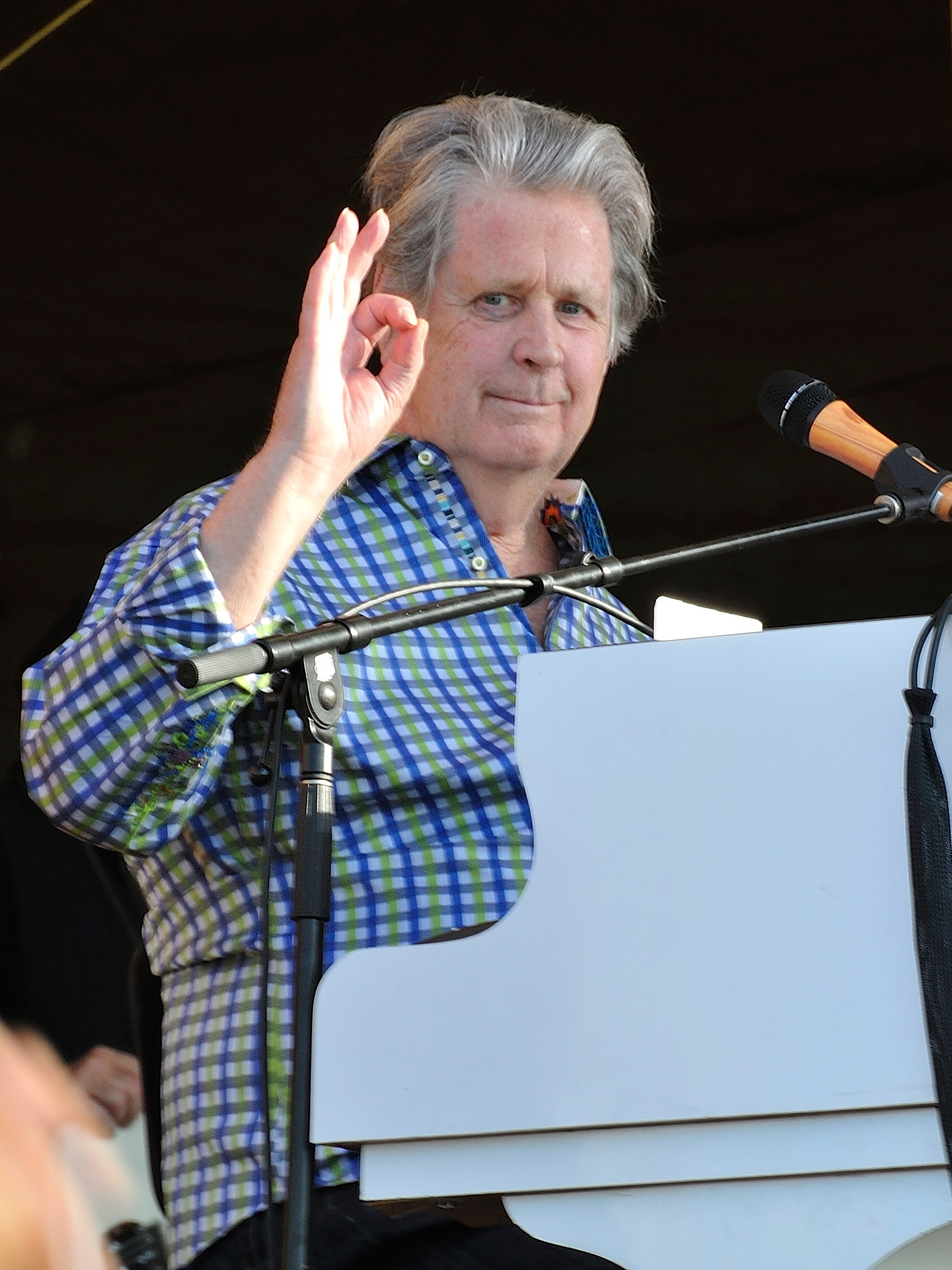
Brian Wilson, musician

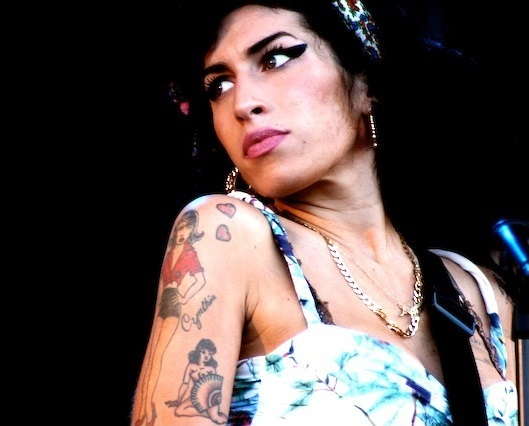
Amy Winehouse, singer-songwriter

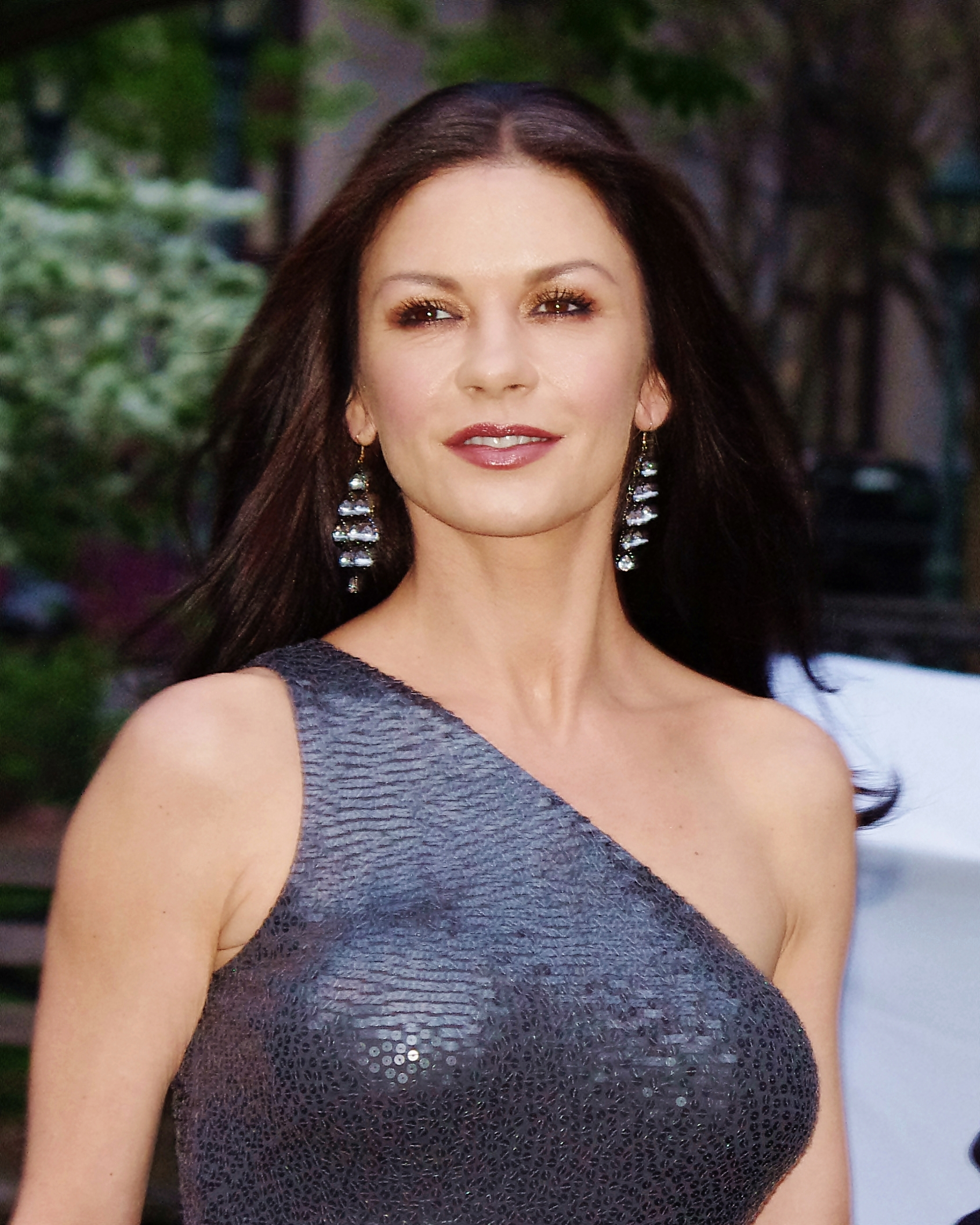
Catherine Zeta-Jones, actress

== A ==
- John Adams, President of the United States 1797-1801.
- Guma Aguiar, Brazilian-born American energy industrialist and millionaire businessman.
- Alvin Ailey, American choreographer, diagnosed with bipolar disorder (then called manic depression).
- Chantal Akerman, Belgian film director, screenwriter, artist, and film professor.
- Sherman Alexie, Native American poet, writer, and filmmaker.
- Lily Allen, English musician.
- Tandyn Almer, American songwriter, musician, and record producer who wrote the 1966 song "Along Comes Mary" for the Association.
- Louis Althusser, French Marxist philosopher.
- Rei Ami, South Korean and American singer and rapper.
- August Ames, Canadian pornographic actress.
- Kasey Anderson, American singer, songwriter, guitarist, producer and musician.
- Michael Angelakos, American musician, frontman of Passion Pit.
- Adam Ant, English musician and actor.
- Susanne Antonetta, American poet and author who is most widely known for her book Body Toxic: An Environmental Memoir.
- Emilie Autumn, American singer and violinist.

== B ==
- Tyler Baltierra, American reality television personality.
- Maria Bamford, American comedian, stated in a 2011 interview with The Salt Lake Tribune that she had been diagnosed with bipolar II disorder; she has frequently incorporated jokes about her condition in her stand-up comedy routine and her filmography.
- Marcel Barbeau, Canadian artist and painter.
- Ned Beatty, Oscar nominated American actor.
- Maria Bello, producer, actress and writer.
- Danielle Belton, American journalist who is the editor-in-chief of HuffPost. In 2011 she worked on developing a television show for Black Entertainment Television (BET) called Don't Sleep, hosted by T. J. Holmes; she became its head writer. Although the show was cancelled after 8 months, it was nominated for an NAACP Image Award in 2013.
- Max Bemis, frontman of the band Say Anything, spoke about his diagnosis in an interview with Alternative Magazine in 2014.
- Maurice Benard, actor, discussed his diagnosis on The Oprah Winfrey Show, and has since become active in promoting bipolar awareness.
- Benga (Adegbenga Adejumo), British dubstep DJ and producer.
- A. C. Benson, English essayist, poet, author and the 28th Master of Magdalene College, Cambridge.
- Davone Bess, American football player.
- Devika Bhushan, Indian-American pediatrician and public health professional; served as California's Acting Surgeon General (2022)
- Jayson Blair, American journalist formerly with The New York Times.
- Heston Blumenthal, British celebrity chef, TV personality and food writer.
- Kemah Bob, American comedian.
- Ludwig Boltzmann, Austrian mathematician and theoretical physicist. His greatest achievements were the development of statistical mechanics and the statistical explanation of the second law of thermodynamics. His grandfather, who had moved to Vienna from Berlin, was a clock manufacturer.
- Roscoe Born, American songwriter and actor.
- Dutch Boyd, American professional poker player.
- Paul Boyd, classical animator.
- L. Brent Bozell Jr., American conservative activist and writer. He wrote publicly about his experiences with and recovery from bipolar disorder.
- Russell Brand, British comedian, actor, radio host, author, and activist.
- Jonathan Brandis, American actor.
- Ronald Braunstein, American orchestra conductor and cofounder of the ME2/Orchestra for individuals like himself who have mental illness.
- Jeremy Brett, English Shakespearian actor, known for his definitive portrayal of the iconic Arthur Conan Doyle detective Sherlock Holmes in the 1984–1994 Granada TV series, Sherlock Holmes, was diagnosed with manic depression. Days before he died in 1995, he recorded a frank and uplifting message for the Manic/Depressive Fellowship in London.
- John H. Brodie, American physicist
- Bobby Brown, American singer, songwriter, rapper, and dancer.
- Chris Brown, American singer, songwriter, rapper, dancer, and actor, Brown has been diagnosed with Bipolar II disorder.
- Tiffany Lee Brown, American writer, artist, and musician, has created works that reference her Bipolar I disorder diagnosis including the Noise music composition "Belly" appearing on Women Take Back the Noise.
- Frank Bruno, British boxer, was hospitalized for a short period, and as of 2005 was on lithium.
- Barney Bubbles, English graphic artist whose work encompassed graphic design and music video direction. Bubbles took his own life when he was 41.
- Art Buchwald, humorist and Pulitzer Prize winner.
- Elbridge Ayer Burbank, artist and painter, Burbank was diagnosed with manic depression and was treated at several different facilities during his life.
- Amanda Bynes, American actress of Big Fat Liar fame.

== C ==
- Eoin Cameron, former member of the Australian House of Representatives and radio personality in Perth, Western Australia.
- Robert Campeau, Canadian financier and real estate developer.
- Cosmo Campoli, American sculptor and teacher.
- Brooke Candy, American rapper, singer, songwriter, and tattoo artist.
- Mariah Carey, American singer-songwriter. Diagnosed with Bipolar II disorder in 2001.
- Robert Carradine, American actor
- Lisa Nicole Carson, American actress.
- Aaron Carter, American singer.
- Quincy Carter, American football quarterback.
- Keisha Castle-Hughes, New Zealand actress.
- Jack Cassidy, American actor and singer
- René-Robert Cavelier, Sieur de La Salle, French explorer who explored the Great Lakes region and claimed the Mississippi River basin for France.
- Dick Cavett, comedian and television journalist.
- Eason Chan, Hong Kong singer and actor.
- Akio Chiba, Japanese manga artist, committed suicide due to issues related to bipolar disorder.
- Nicky Chinn, English-American songwriter.
- Winston Churchill, former Prime Minister of the United Kingdom.
- Angus Crichton, Australian representative rugby league player
- Rosemary Clooney, American singer and actress.
- Kurt Cobain, American rock musician. Diagnosed with bipolar disorder, clinical depression, and attention deficit disorder at a young age according to several family members.
- Neil Cole, former Australian Labor party politician. "Associate Professor Cole was the first politician in Australia or overseas to admit to having a mental illness, namely bipolar mood disorder."
- Samuel Taylor Coleridge, English Romantic poet.
- Mary Ellen Copeland, PhD, author, educator and mental health advocate.
- Francis Ford Coppola, American film director, producer, and screenwriter, was diagnosed by a psychiatrist as having bipolar disorder.
- Patricia Cornwell, American crime writer.
- Robert S. Corrington, American philosopher and professor of Philosophical Theology. In his book Riding the Windhorse: Manic-Depressive Disorder and the Quest for Wholeness, he gives a personal account of his own experience with the condition.
- Michael Costa, former Australian Labor party politician and Treasurer of NSW. "Mr Costa said a number of state parliamentary colleagues approached him about their mental health problems after he publicly revealed his battle with bipolar disorder in 2001."
- Sean Costello, American blues musician.
- Vincent Crane, keyboard player of Atomic Rooster.
- Tim Crooks, British rower who won a silver medal at the 1976 Montreal Olympics. He later wrote about his life, career, and struggle with bipolar disorder in his autobiography, Driven by Demons.

== D ==
- Paul Dalio, American writer, director, and composer. He made his feature directorial debut with Touched with Fire (2016), a film which drew upon his own experience with bipolar disorder.
- Penina Davidson, Former college basketball player at University of California-Berkeley. Current professional basketball player for the Melbourne Boomers of the Women's National Basketball League in Australia. She also represents New Zealand on their national team, the Tall Ferns. While in college, she was self-harming. Her teammate suggested that she get admitted to a hospital where she got diagnosed with bipolar disorder
- Pete Davidson, Comedian and actor. Pete Davidson was diagnosed with bipolar disorder and borderline personality disorder.
- Gareth Davies, British politician who stated he contemplated suicide before his diagnosis in 2020 which changed his life.
- Ray Davies, English composer. Davies was diagnosed with bipolar disorder and he attempted suicide.
- Adam Deacon, English film actor, rapper, writer and director. Deacon discussed his diagnosis in a 2016 interview with Stephen Fry.
- Swadesh Deepak, Indian playwright, novelist and short-story writer.
- Nicolas Demorand, French journalist. In 2025, he wrote a book about his experience with bipolar disorder.
- Johnny Depp, American actor and musician was suffering from bipolar disorder, ADHD, insomnia, substance abuse disorder and depression.
- Disco D, record producer and composer.
- DMX, American rapper and actor.
- Gaetano Donizetti, Italian composer, Donizetti was exhibiting symptoms of syphilis and probable bipolar disorder.
- Mike Doughty, singer from alternative rock band Soul Coughing.
- Robert Downey Jr. American actor and film producer.
- DPR Ian Australian singer, rapper, and director.
- Richard Dreyfuss, actor, appeared in a BBC documentary to talk about his experience with the disorder.
- Patty Duke, actress, author, and mental health advocate.
- Faye Dunaway, American actress.
- Andy Dunn, co-founder and former CEO of Bonobos (apparel).

== E ==
- Thomas Eagleton (1929–2007), United States Senator from Missouri (1968–1987). He received a diagnosis of bipolar II from Dr. Frederick K. Goodwin.
- Harlan Ellison (1934–2018), American author.
- Paul M. English, Entrepreneur and Founder of Kayak (company).
- Cameron Esposito, American actress, comedian, and podcaster known for her show Take My Wife.

== F ==
- David Feherty, former professional golfer on the European Tour and PGA Tour.
- Carrie Fisher, actress and writer. Starred in the Star Wars films as Princess Leia.
- Zelda Fitzgerald, American socialite and novelist, and the wife of American author F. Scott Fitzgerald, diagnosed at the time as schizophrenia, but now thought likelier to be bipolar disorder.
- Caroline Flack, English actress and television and radio presenter.
- Helen Flanagan, English model, Actress.
- Tom Fletcher, English singer, songwriter, pianist, and guitarist of McFly, discussed his bipolar disorder in the book Unsaid Things... Our Story.
- Larry Flynt, publisher and the president of Larry Flynt Publications (LFP) and Hustler Magazine.
- Ellen Forney, graphic artist and cartoonist and creator of Marbles: Madness, Depression, Michelangelo, and Me.
- FouseyTube, American YouTube personality.
- Connie Francis, singer.
- Ryan Freel, American baseball player.
- Jennifer Frey, journalist.
- Stephen Fry, actor, comedian, and writer. Fry was the center of the Emmy Award-winning documentary Stephen Fry: The Secret Life of the Manic Depressive in which he shares his experience being diagnosed with cyclothymic disorder and interviews a number of celebrities who are also diagnosed with bipolar-related disorders.
- Justin Furstenfeld, lead singer of Blue October.
- Tyson Fury, British professional boxer and former WBC heavyweight title holder.

== G ==
- The Game, Rapper.
- Alan Garner, novelist, wrote about having bipolar disorder in a collection of critical and autobiographical essays.
- Jeff Garlin, American actor
- Paul Gascoigne, English footballer, wrote about his treatment for bipolar disorder in his second book.
- Isa Genzken, German contemporary artist.
- Mel Gibson, actor and director.
- Fred Gil, former Portuguese professional tennis player who was born in São Jorge de Arroios, Lisbon. His father Rui worked for an insurance company and his mother Carlota is a mathematics teacher. He has a younger sister named Ana.
- Selena Gomez, American singer-songwriter and actress. Revealed her bipolar diagnosis in April 2020 in an Instagram livestream with Miley Cyrus.
- Matthew Good, Canadian musician. He first disclosed his illness in a personal blog.
- Willa Goodfellow, American author and cleric. Goodfellow wrote a memoir about her Bipolar II diagnosis, which was initially misdiagnosed as depression.
- Ben Gordon, Former NBA Player. Winner of the Sixth Man of the Year in 2005.
- Boon Gould, British musician.
- Glenn Gould, Canadian pianist.
- Philip Graham, publisher and businessman.
- Emily Graslie, an American science communicator and YouTube educator, revealed in June 2023 that she had been diagnosed with bipolar disorder in late 2020.
- Macy Gray, American R&B and soul singer.
- Graham Greene, English novelist.
- Everson Griffen, American football player
- Brent Guy, American college football coach and former player.

== H ==
- Charles Haley, American football linebacker.
- Anthony Michael Hall, American actor known for being in the "Brat Pack".
- Terry Hall, lead singer of The Specials.
- Halsey, American singer and songwriter.
- Charles Hamilton, American hip-hop recording artist.
- Linda Hamilton, actress, star of the Terminator movies. Was diagnosed at the age of 40.
- Suzy Favor Hamilton, American former middle-distance runner.
- Jeff Hammerbacher, data scientist, chief scientist at Cloudera.
- David Harbour, American actor.
- Anthony Hardy, English serial killer.
- Beth Hart, American singer and songwriter.
- Teddy Hart, Canadian professional wrestler.
- Mariette Hartley, American actress, has publicly spoken about her bipolar disorder, was a founder of the American Foundation for Suicide Prevention.
- Doug Harvey, Canadian professional ice hockey player.
- Jonathan Hay, Australian rules footballer.
- Ernest Hemingway, American journalist, won the Pulitzer Prize (1953) and the Nobel Prize in Literature (1954) for his novel The Old Man and the Sea. He was diagnosed with bipolar disorder and insomnia in his later years. He committed suicide in 1961.
- Erin Henderson, American football player and coach.
- Drewe Henley, British actor, Henley and his illness were discussed in her autobiography White Cargo.
- Kristin Hersh, musician, of rock band Throwing Muses, has spoken about her bipolar disorder.
- Derek Hess, designer and visual artist.
- Shane Hmiel, NASCAR driver.
- Abbie Hoffman, political activist, anarchist.
- Chamique Holdsclaw, American former basketball player who was a six time WNBA All-Star.
- Marya Hornbacher, writer.
- Byron Houston, basketball player.
- Cat Hulbert, American card player.
- Meg Hutchinson, American folk singer-songwriter.
- Julian Huxley, British evolutionary biologist, eugenicist, and internationalist. In his wife's autobiography, it seems that he had a form of bipolar disorder.
- Phyllis Hyman, American R&B singer-songwriter.

== I ==
- Greg Inglis, former Australian representative rugby league footballer and captain of South Sydney Rabbitohs. Diagnosed Bipolar II in 2019.
- Jack Irons, American drummer with Pearl Jam and Red Hot Chili Peppers.

== J ==
- Jesse Jackson, Jr., a former member of the United States House of Representatives, has stated he's been diagnosed with bipolar II disorder.
- Hope Jahren, an American geochemist and geobiologist, wrote about her experience with bipolar disorder in her memoir Lab Girl.
- Kay Redfield Jamison, American clinical psychologist, professor of psychiatry and writer, has written extensively about her personal experiences with bipolar disorder, including in An Unquiet Mind.
- Jill Janus, American heavy metal singer.
- Adam Jasinski, winner of the U.S. series Big Brother 9.
- Andrew Johns, Australian rugby league player. Publicly announced his condition following retirement.
- "Fast" Eddie Johnson, an American basketball player, was diagnosed with manic depression.
- Linea Johnson, American author of the book Perfect Chaos and mental health advocate
- Daniel Johnston, musician, singer-songwriter and visual artist.
- Adam Jones (American football), American former professional football player.
- Lee Joon, South Korean singer and actor.
- Benn Jordan, American musician, researcher, and science communicator.
- Lucia Joyce, daughter of writer James Joyce, was diagnosed with cyclothymia.
- Sarah Joyce, British singer–songwriter.
- Helmi Juvonen, American artist and painter, hospitalized and diagnosed with manic depression.

== K ==
- Frida Kahlo, Mexican painter
- Krizz Kaliko, American hip hop musician.
- Antonie Kamerling, Dutch actor.
- Kannadasan, philosopher and poet from Tamil Nadu, India.
- Chris Kanyon, American professional wrestler.
- Margarita Karapanou, Greek novelist.
- Kerry Katona, English television presenter, writer, magazine columnist, and former pop singer with girl band Atomic Kitten.
- Kehlani, American R&B singer-songwriter, publicly revealed their bipolar and borderline personality disorder diagnosis in an Instagram post in 2025.
- Patrick J. Kennedy, former member of the United States House of Representatives, has spoken on his mental health issues, including diagnosed bipolar disorder.
- Jang Keun Suk, South Korean actor and singer.
- Margot Kidder, Canadian-American actress.
- Cássia Kis, Brazilian actress.
- Morio Kita, Japanese psychiatrist, novelist, and essayist.
- Otto Klemperer, German-born American conductor and composer, was diagnosed with cyclothymia.
- John Konrads, Australian freestyle swimmer.

== L ==
- David LaChapelle, American commercial photographer, fine-art photographer, music video director, film director, and artist.
- Debra LaFave, schoolteacher who raped a minor student.
- Mary Lambert, American actress, singer, and writer, revealed that she had the illness in an interview with shewired.com and in her 2014 song "Secrets".
- Yung Lean, Swedish rapper and singer.
- Kiana Ledé, American singer-songwriter and actress.
- AJ Lee, American professional wrestler and author.
- Rita Lee, Brazilian singer and songwriter.
- Yoon Ha Lee, Korean-American science fiction writer.
- Robin Lehner, Swedish former NHL goalie who tried to drink himself to death.
- Chyler Leigh, American actress
- Vivien Leigh, English actress, most famous for her role as Scarlett O'Hara in David O. Selznick's movie Gone with the Wind.
- Bernard Levin, English journalist, mentions it in his autobiography
- Jenifer Lewis, American actress, spoke about her diagnosis on Oprah in September 2007.
- Bill Lichtenstein, Peabody Award-winning print and broadcast journalist and documentary filmmaker, profiled in Time magazine, 10 October 1994.
- Thomas Ligotti, American horror author
- Lil Nas X, American rapper, singer and songwriter
- Arthur Lipsett, film director.
- Bernard Loiseau, French chef, was the chef and the owner of 3-star Michelin restaurant-La Côte d'Or, Loiseau committed suicide on 24 February 2003.
- Ellen Joyce Loo, Hong Kong singer and songwriter.
- Demi Lovato, American singer and actress.
- Ada Lovelace, British mathematician, often regarded as the first computer programmer.
- Ris Low, beauty pageant titleholder, Miss Singapore World 2009.
- Sue Lyon, American actress.

== M ==
- Selin Macieira-Boşgelmez, English bassist of the punk rock band Lambrini Girls.
- Gustav Mahler, composer.
- Tina Malone, British television actress, writer, director, and producer (Brookside, Shameless). Diagnosed with obsessive compulsive disorder and bipolar disorder in 1998.
- Gucci Mane, American musician.
- Jesse Zook Mann, American television producer.
- Johnny Manziel, American football player. In an interview in 2018, Manziel recounted his personal problems, and has stated that he had been diagnosed with bipolar disorder.
- Diego Maradona, Argentine footballer and manager.
- Jessica Marais, South African-Australian actress. She has stated that she has had bipolar episodes since she was 12 years old, suggesting that these episodes have been caused by the death of her father from a heart attack.
- Emily Martin, sinologist, anthropologist, feminist, professor at New York University; drew on her own experience with bipolar disorder to write Bipolar Expeditions: Mania and Depression in American Culture.
- Gregg F. Martin, US Army major general (retired). Author of Bipolar General: My Forever War with Mental Illness.
- Karen McCarthy, former member of the United States House of Representatives, was revealed to have been diagnosed with bipolar disorder in 2009.
- Arthur McIntyre, Australian artist.
- Lenny McLean, English unlicensed boxer, bouncer, bodyguard, businessman and actor.
- Kristy McNichol, actress.
- Burgess Meredith, actor, had cyclothymia.
- Randy Meisner, American musician with The Eagles.
- H. V. Meyerowitz, artist, educator and British colonial administrator in Africa, had cyclothymia.
- Dimitri Mihalas, astrophysicist.
- Billy Miller (actor), American actor known for The Young and the Restless and General Hospital. After his suicide his mother was quoted as saying "He fought a long hard valiant battle with bipolar depression for years. He did everything he could to control the disease. He loved his family, his friends and his fans but in the end the disease won the fight and he surrendered his life."
- Liz Miller, British physician, surgeon, campaigner and writer.
- Kate Millett, artist, activist and feminist writer.
- Eric Millegan, actor.
- Spike Milligan, comedian.
- Valdemar Schønheyder Møller, Danish painter, known for his depictions of sunlight. He had bipolar episodes. In 1901, he was admitted to the psychiatric hospital in Aarhus and remained there until his death in 1905.
- Melody Moezzi, activist, lawyer, and author of Haldol and Hyacinths: A Bipolar Life.
- Seaneen Molloy, Northern Irish blogger.
- Ben Moody, guitarist, musician, formerly with Evanescence.
- Jonathan Morrell, English radio and television producer, was diagnosed with cyclothymia.
- Petr Muk, Czech singer.
- John A. Mulheren, American financier, stock and option trader, and philanthropist.
- Edvard Munch, Norwegian painter.
- Robert Munsch, author.
- Craig Murray, former British ambassador to Uzbekistan and political activist.

== N ==
- Jason Nash, YouTuber.
- Isaac Newton, English Physicist, inventor of calculus.
- Chuck Nice, American stand-up comedian and media host who got his name from a local DJ in Jersey City named Chuck Nice, who made mixtapes.
- Kim Novak, actress.

== O ==
- Phil Ochs, singer-songwriter, political activist.
- Sinead O'Connor, Irish singer, songwriter, and activist who drew attention to human rights, child abuse, women's rights and racism.
- Bill Oddie, naturalist, comedian, and television presenter.
- Keith O'Neil, American former NFL linebacker who won a ring with the Indianapolis Colts in Super Bowl XLI.
- Dolores O'Riordan, Irish musician and singer-songwriter, leader of the rock band The Cranberries.
- Ozzy Osbourne, English singer, songwriter, and media personality. Dubbed the "Prince of Darkness". He co-founded Black Sabbath.
- Oxxxymiron, Russian hip-hop artist.

== P ==
- Skyler Page, American animator, creator of Clarence.
- Steven Page, former singer for rock band Barenaked Ladies.
- Nicola Pagett, actor. Wrote about her bipolar disorder in her autobiography Diamonds Behind My Eyes.
- Jaco Pastorius, jazz musician. "Jaco was diagnosed with this clinical bipolar condition in the fall of 1982. The events which led up to it were considered "uncontrolled and reckless" incidents."
- Jane Pauley, TV presenter and journalist. The former Today and Dateline host describes being diagnosed with bipolar disorder in her 2004 autobiography Skywriting: A Life Out of the Blue, as well as on her short-lived talk show.
- Ota Pavel, Czech writer, journalist and sport reporter.
- Aubrey Peeples, American actress and singer.
- Lynne Perrie, English actress (Coronation Street, Queenie's Castle, Kes), singer, comedienne, presenter and author. In an interview with the Daily Mirror newspaper, in 2000 she spoke about her manic depression, as well as memory loss and spending ten weeks in a psychiatric hospital.
- Jimmy Piersall, American baseball player.
- Christa Pike, American convicted murderer; diagnosed with bipolar disorder by forensic psychiatrist William Kenner during 2001–2002 post-conviction proceedings.
- Carolina Díaz Pimentel, Peruvian journalist and mental health activist, diagnosed with bipolar II disorder.
- William Pitt, 1st Earl of Chatham, British statesman.
- Sylvia Plath, American poet and author.
- Edgar Allan Poe, poet and writer, may have experienced bipolar disorder.
- Benoît Poelvoorde, Belgian comedian and actor.
- Tiffany Pollard, reality star and actress.
- Jackson Pollock, American artist.
- Odean Pope, American jazz musician.
- Gail Porter, British TV presenter.
- Amber Portwood, American reality television personality.
- Emil Post, American mathematician and logician. He is best known for his work in the field that eventually became known as computability theory. Post was bipolar and had his first attack in 1921, for the rest of his life he would have to be periodically hospitalized and given electroshock, the standard treatment at that time.
- Genesis Potini, New Zealand chess player. Potini had bipolar disorder and was regularly admitted to hospital.
- Heinz Prechter, entrepreneur, philanthropist, founder of the American Sunroof Company (ASC); former Harvard Business Club Entrepreneur of the Year; after his suicide, his family established the Heinz C. Prechter Bipolar Research Fund at the University of Michigan in his memory.
- Charley Pride, country music artist.

== Q ==
- A.B. Quintanilla, American record producer, songwriter and musician.

== R ==
- Gabriele Rabel, botanist, physicist.
- Nathan Rabin, American film and music critic, diagnosed with bipolar II disorder.
- Mauro Ranallo, Canadian sport announcer and commentator.
- Reckful, American esports player, Twitch streamer and YouTuber
- Lou Reed, musician.
- Bebe Rexha, singer, songwriter.
- Jason Ricci, American harmonica player and singer.
- Alan Ritchson, American actor.
- Lynn N. Rivers, member of the United States House of Representatives representing Michigan's 13th congressional district from 1995 to 2003, first openly bipolar member of the United States Congress.
- Rene Rivkin, entrepreneur.
- Chappell Roan, American singer-songwriter
- Barret Robbins, former NFL Pro Bowler.
- Peter Robbins, American child act or.
- Svend Robinson, Canadian politician, was diagnosed with cyclothymia.
- Mickey Rooney, American actor.
- John Ruskin, English art critic of the Victorian era, art patron, draughtsman, watercolourist, prominent social thinker and philanthropist.
- Rene Russo, American actress, producer, and former model.

== S ==
- Gary Lee Sampson, American murderer.
- Alex Sangha, Canadian social worker and documentary film producer.
- Rob Scallon, American YouTuber, musician, and multi-instrumentalist, confirmed in July 2024 that he had been diagnosed with Bipolar 1 disorder the previous year.
- Cher Scarlett, American software engineer, workers' rights activist, and corporate whistleblower.
- Francesco Scavullo, artist, fashion photographer. In 1981, after four nervous breakdowns Scavullo was diagnosed as manic-depressive.
- Robert Schumann, German composer.
- Katja Schuurman, Dutch television presenter
- Tommy Lynn Sells, American serial killer.
- Anne Sexton, American poet won the Pulitzer Prize for poetry in 1967 for her book Live or Die, diagnosed with bipolar disorder after many suicide attempts.
- Paul Sharits, visual artist.
- Charlie Sheen, American actor.
- Nina Simone, American singer.
- Naomi Sims, American model, businesswoman and author, widely credited as being the first African-American supermodel.
- Frank Sinatra, American singer and actor. "Being an 18-karat manic depressive, and having lived a life of violent emotional contradictions, I have an over-acute capacity for sadness as well as elation."
- Yo Yo Honey Singh, Indian rapper, music producer, singer, and film actor.
- Sushant Singh Rajput, Indian actor
- Michael Slater, International Australian cricketer, forced to retire because of related symptoms.
- Tony Slattery, actor and comedian. "I rented a huge warehouse by the river Thames. I just stayed in there on my own, didn't open the mail or answer the phone for months and months and months. I was just in a pool of despair and mania."
- Tim Smith, rugby league player whose career with NRL side Parramatta Eels was ended due to his bipolar condition, and pressure from the media.
- Charlene Soraia, British singer-songwriter, musician has cyclothymia.
- Britney Spears, American singer, songwriter, and dancer.
- Phil Spector, American record producer.
- Alonzo Spellman, American football player.
- Dusty Springfield, English pop singer.
- Scott Stapp, frontman, Creed.
- Peter Steele, frontman, Type O Negative.
- Brody Stevens, American comedian.
- ND Stevenson, cartoonist and animation producer.
- Steve-O, American stunt performer, comedian, television personality, and podcaster.
- Sting (musician), English musician, songwriter and actor. He was the frontman, principal songwriter and bassist for the rock band The Police. He helped his father deliver milk and by ten was "obsessed" with an old Spanish guitar left by an emigrating friend of his father.
- Darryl Strawberry, baseball player.
- David Strickland, actor, Suddenly Susan.
- Michael Strunge, Danish poet, killed himself by jumping from a building during mania.
- Gilbert Stuart, American painter.
- Poly Styrene (real name Marion Elliot-Said), singer.
- Stuart Sutherland, British psychologist and writer.
- Matthew Sweet, American singer-songwriter.
- SZA, American R&B singer-songwriter.

== T ==
- Corey Taylor, American musician/frontman of Slipknot and Stone Sour.
- Jax Taylor, American television personality, model, and actor.
- Lili Taylor, American actress.
- Michael Thalbourne, Australian psychologist and parapsychologist.
- Abbott Handerson Thayer, American artist and painter.
- Debi Thomas, Olympic medalist, former figure skater and physician.
- Steven Thomas, American entrepreneur.
- Ron Thompson, American politician, former member of the West Virginia House of Delegates; has Bipolar II disorder.
- Greta Thunberg, Swedish activist.
- Gene Tierney, actress, nominated for Academy Award for Best Actress (1945).
- Andrew Toles, American former baseball outfielder for the Los Angeles Dodgers and Kroger grocery store employee was diagnosed with bipolar disorder and schizophrenia.
- Taylor Tomlinson, American comedian; she has frequently discussed her diagnosis of bipolar disorder in her material, including in her 2022 special Look at You.
- Devin Townsend, musician of Strapping Young Lad and The Devin Townsend Band. He took himself off of his medication to write lyrics for Alien.
- Nick Traina, American singer, son of American bestselling writer Danielle Steel.
- Timothy Treadwell, American environmentalist and bear enthusiast, featured in the 2005 documentary film by Werner Herzog titled Grizzly Man.
- Margaret Trudeau, Canadian celebrity and ex-wife of former Canadian Prime Minister Pierre Elliot Trudeau. She now travels Canada and other countries speaking out against the stigmas on mental illness.
- Michael Tunn, Australian radio announcer and television presenter.
- Ted Turner, American media businessman. Founder of CNN.
- Mike Tyson, American professional boxer and former undisputed heavyweight champion.

== U ==
- Dimitrius Underwood, former American football player.

== V ==
- Jean-Claude Van Damme, Belgian actor and martial artist.
- Vincent van Gogh, artist. (among numerous other hypotheses)
- Heleen van Royen, Dutch writer
- Townes Van Zandt, singer-songwriter.
- Joseph Vásquez, American independent filmmaker.
- Katherine Vibert, A U.S. weightlifter who won the silver medal at the Tokyo 2020 Olympics. She was diagnosed with bipolar II disorder in 2019 but did not let it prevent her from achieving her goals, eventually taking home Olympic hardware. She has bipolar II and mild ADHD.
- Eric Victorino, vocalist of The Limousines, author.
- Byron Vincent, writer, performer, and broadcaster.
- Mark Vonnegut, author and physician.

== W ==
- James Wade, English professional darts player.
- Ayelet Waldman, Israeli-American novelist and essayist, has written about her bipolar II disorder.
- Dorothy Wall, Australian author and illustrator best known for creating Blinky Bill
- David Walliams, actor, author, comedian and charity fundraiser.
- Ruby Wax, American actress, mental health campaigner, lecturer, and author.
- Scott Weiland, musician for Stone Temple Pilots, Velvet Revolver.
- Mikey Welsh, American artist and musician. He played bass for Weezer.
- Pete Wentz, musician for Fall Out Boy.
- Delonte West, American basketball player.
- Norman Wexler, screenwriter.
- Mark Whitacre, business executive depicted in the film The Informant.
- Norbert Wiener, American mathematician, philosopher, originator of cybernetics.
- Gerald Wilkins, Former NBA player with Knicks, Cavs, Magic and Grizzlies.
- Brian Wilson, musician and founding member of The Beach Boys.
- Stanley Wilson (running back), American football player.
- Stanley Wilson Jr., American football player.
- Amy Winehouse, English singer-songwriter.
- Jonathan Winters, American comedian, actor, author, and artist.
- Frank Wisner, OSS officer.
- Will Wood, an American singer-songwriter, composer, filmmaker, and multimedia artist.
- Virginia Woolf, writer.
- Luther Wright, American basketball player.

== X ==
- XXXTentacion, rapper, singer, songwriter and record producer.

== Y ==
- Bert Yancey, American professional golfer.
- Ye, musician, record producer, entrepreneur and fashion designer.
- Lee Thompson Young, actor.
- Titus Young, American football player.
- Yo Yo Honey Singh, Indian Rapper, music producer

== Z ==
- Bruno Zehnder, Swiss photographer.
- Catherine Zeta-Jones, Welsh actress, has Bipolar II disorder.

== See also ==
- List of fictional characters with bipolar disorder
- List of people with schizophrenia
- List of people with post-traumatic stress disorder
- Outline of bipolar disorder
