= Ned Zeman =

American journalist

Ned Zeman (born 1966) is a writer for Vanity Fair magazine and also a screenwriter. He covers Hollywood, crime, politics, and wildlife. He joined Vanity Fair as a senior editor in May 1997. In June 2000, he became a contributing editor. Before Vanity Fair, he wrote for GQ, Sports Illustrated, and Outside. He was a staff writer at Newsweek from 1988 to 1993 during which he also wrote for Spy.

== Works ==
He has covered and interviewed celebrities such as Jennifer Lopez, Mike Ovitz, and Julia Roberts.

While reporting a 2001 story about Steven Seagal's links to the mafia, he was threatened by an unknown gunman. Zeman wrote an article about the death of Timothy Treadwell, who lived among bears.

In 2011, Zeman published his memoir The Rules of the Tunnel: My Brief Period of Madness, where he details his battle with clinical depression.

== Awards and honors ==
His article on the death of Timothy Treadwell was a finalist for the National Magazine Award. This same article was optioned for movie production, as was his article on wildlife photographer Bruno Zehnder.

== Bibliography ==
- Zeman, Ned (Jun 2013). "The boy who cried dead girlfriend". Scandal. Vanity Fair. Vol. 634. Additional reporting by Jaime Lalinde. pp. 55–59.
