= Carolina Díaz Pimentel =

Peruvian journalist and mental health activist

- Born: January 9, 1993 (age 33); Peru
- Education: UPC
- Occupations: mental health activist, journalist
- Awards: 100 Women (BBC) (2023)

Carolina Díaz Pimentel is a Peruvian journalist and mental health activist. As a reporter, she covers issues related to mental health and neurodivergence. As an activist, she founded the blog More than Bipolar and was the co-founder of the Peruvian Neurodivergent Coalition (CNP). In November 2023, she was named one of the most influential women in the world by the BBC 100 Women.

== Biography ==
Díaz is a journalist by profession. She was diagnosed with autism at the age of 29 and also has bipolar II disorder. She founded non-profit organisations such as Peruvian Neurodivergent Coalition, More than Bipolar, and Atypical Project. Pimentel is also a Rosalynn Carter Fellow and a Pulitzer Centre recipient. In November 2023, she was included in the BBC 100 Women list. She is a feminist.
