= Bruno Zehnder =

Bruno "Penguin" Zehnder (born 8 September 1945 in Bad Ragaz, died 7 July 1997 at the Mirny Station in Antarctica) was a Swiss photographer. He specialized in penguins, as he was particularly fascinated by the emperor penguins and their life on the pack ice.

He died in 1997, as the result of getting lost in a snowstorm.
