= List of performance poets =

The following is a partial list of performance poets.

== Africa ==
=== Nigeria ===
- Eva Alordiah

=== South Africa ===
- Phillippa Yaa de Villiers
- Lebogang Mashile
- Isabella Motadinyane
- Lesego Rampolokeng

== North America ==
=== Canada ===
- Lillian Allen
- Afua Cooper
- Shane Koyczan
- Brendan McLeod
- Susan McMaster
- Chris Tse
- Mustafa the Poet
- Dwayne Morgan
- Leah Lakshmi Piepzna-Samarasinha
- Sheri-D Wilson
- Kaie Kellough
- Boonaa Mohammed

=== United States ===
A-E

- Hanif Abdurraqib
- Taalam Acey
- Alurista
- David Antin
- Craig Arnold
- Robert Ashley
- Amiri Baraka
- John M. Bennett
- Buddy Wakefield
- Big Poppa E
- Nicole Blackman
- Brother Dash
- Ariana Brown
- Derrick Brown
- B. Dolan
- Roger Bonair-Agard
- Giannina Braschi
- Clint Catalyst
- Richard Cambridge
- Imani Cezanne
- Staceyann Chin
- Jim Cohn
- Allison Hedge Coke
- Desireé Dallagiacomo
- Jamie DeWolf
- Maggie Estep

F-J

- Karen Finley
- Shaggy Flores
- Denice Frohman
- Kip Fulbeck
- Andrea Gibson
- Allen Ginsberg
- John Giorno
- Jesse Glass
- Gary Glazner
- Guillermo Gómez-Peña
- Roxy Gordon
- Hedwig Gorski
- John S. Hall
- John Agard
- Suheir Hammad
- Matt Harvey
- Bradley Hathaway
- M. Ayodele Heath
- Neil Hilborn
- Jackie Hill Perry
- Bob Holman
- Detrick Hughes
- J. Ivy
- David Jewell
- Javon Johnson

K-P

- Sarah Kay
- Kealoha
- Nomy Lamm
- Erika Renee Land
- The Last Poets
- Bobby LeFebre
- Al Letson
- Lydia Lunch
- Taylor Mali
- Jeffrey McDaniel
- Mighty Mike McGee
- Karyna McGlynn
- Douglas A. Martin
- Kevin Max
- Boonaa Mohammed
- Lenelle Moïse
- Anis Mojgani
- José Montoya
- Jessica Care Moore
- Porsha Olayiwola
- Alix Olson
- Robert Peters
- Jason Petty
- Lynne Procope

R-Z

- John Rives
- Ursula Rucker
- Carl Hancock Rux
- Michael Salinger
- Bryan Lewis Saunders
- Jill Scott
- Gil Scott-Heron
- Beau Sia
- Darius Simpson
- Otep Shamaya
- Marc Smith
- Patricia Smith
- Patti Smith
- Rod Smith
- Sekou Sundiata
- Taco Shop Poets
- Quincy Troupe
- George Watsky
- Marty Watt
- Buddy Wakefield
- Anne Waldman
- Saul Williams

== Europe ==
=== France ===
- Léo Ferré

=== Italy ===
- Massimo Volume
- Offlaga Disco Pax

=== Germany ===
- Kurt Schwitters

=== Russia ===
- Konstantyn K. Kuzminsky

=== Spain ===
- Carlos Oroza
- El Chojin

=== United Kingdom ===
- Daniel Beaty
- Attila the Stockbroker
- Francesca Beard
- Pete Brown
- Craig Charles
- Muslim Belal
- Paula Claire
- John Cooper Clarke
- Jegsy Dodd
- Salena Godden
- Matt Harvey
- John Hegley
- Adrian Henri
- Michael Horovitz
- Linton Kwesi Johnson
- Anthony Joseph
- Liverpool Poets
- Roger McGough
- Hollie McNish
- The Medway Poets
- Ted Milton
- Andrew Motion
- Brian Patten
- Scroobius Pip
- Jeremy Reed
- Lemn Sissay
- Natalie Stewart
- Rod Summers
- Kae Tempest
- Jim Templeton
- Nick Toczek
- Rhys Trimble
- Byron Vincent
- Seething Wells
- Gez Walsh
- Luke Wright
- Peter Wyton
- Murray Lachlan Young
- Benjamin Zephaniah

== Australia ==
- Jas H. Duke
- Jayne Fenton Keane
- Luka Lesson
- Chris Mansell
- Pi O
- Les Wicks
- Amanda Stewart
- Billy Marshall Stoneking
- Komninos Zervos

== New Zealand ==
- Tusiata Avia
- Miriam Barr
- Ben Fagan
- Sam Hunt
- Craig Ireson
- Michael Rudd
- Apirana Taylor
