= Hedwig Gorski =

American poet

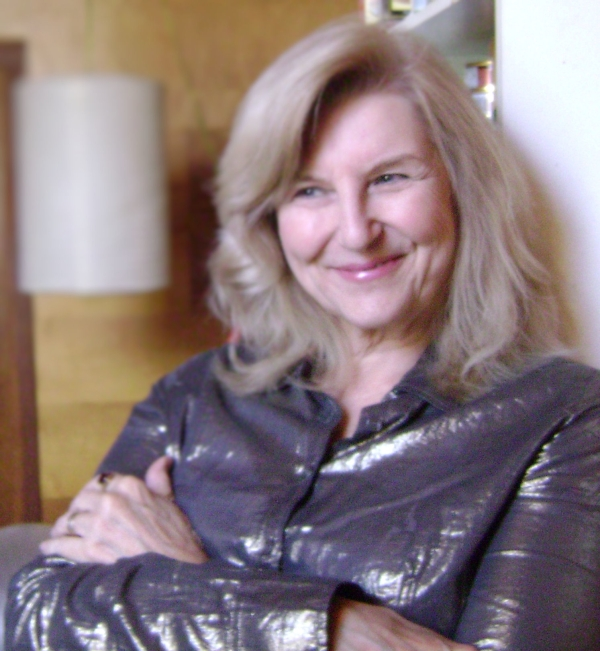
- Gorski in Louisiana, 2009
- Born: Hedwig Irene Gorski; July 18, 1949 (age 76) Trenton, New Jersey, U.S.
- Occupation: Writer, poet
- Literary movement: Performance Poetry, Avant-Garde Poets, Media Artists, Postmodernism
- Notable awards: Fulbright Fellowship; 2003
- Spouse: D'Jalma Garnier

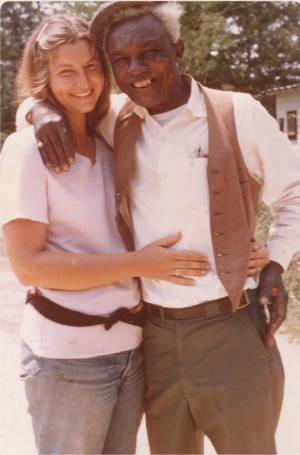
Gorski with Babe Stovall on a 1973 trip to rural Mississippi to visit blues guitarist Roosevelt Holts

Hedwig Irene Gorski (born July 18, 1949) is an American performance poet and an avant-garde artist who labels her aesthetic as "American futurism." The term "performance poetry," a precursor to slam poetry, is attributed to her. It originated in press releases for experimental spoken word and conceptual theater Gorski created during 1979. She is a first-generation Polish American academic scholar and accomplished creative writer. The innovative poetry, prose, drama, and audio works are published and produced in a variety of media using standard and experimental forms.

== Biography ==
A first-generation American citizen, born in Trenton, New Jersey, Gorski's parents and sister emigrated to the United States from Galicia, Poland (present-day Ukraine) following World War II, where two aunts and a grandmother were murdered by Ukrainian partisans.

Her father joined the Polish Underground when aged fourteen, and later the United States Army, arriving with his family in the U.S. in 1949 on the General Sturgis, which docked in New Orleans, Louisiana. Her father did electrical work in Napoleonville before moving to New Jersey. After receiving a Bachelor of Fine Arts in painting from the Nova Scotia College of Art and Design University in Canada, she moved with her first husband to Austin, Texas in 1977. She is married to her second husband, composer D'Jalma Garnier.

== Career ==
Her public career began in New Orleans during 1973, illustrating for the infamous NOLA Express underground newspaper and hawking the new issues on the corner. The archives of NOLA Express are now housed in the University of Connecticut. Gorski and Charles Bukowski are two of the most notable contributors to the NOLA Express. There, she befriended Delta blues musician Babe Stovall and often kept him company while he performed for tourists in Jackson Square receiving tips into his open guitar case. A video of them at New Orleans Jazz and Heritage Festival was made but lost.

Soon after moving to Austin, she divorced and began her poetry and theater careers in earnest by falling into the "[a]tmospheric landscape of the town that summoned and intoxicated so many beloved ... artists of the time toward intense self-actualization." She completed, produced, and directed a one-act play script with the title Booby, Mama! that is an inventive form she named "neo-verse drama". The art memoir of the production states that the verse play was based on a conceptual art cut-up form of writing made famous by William Burroughs. The memoir titled Intoxication: Heathcliff on Powell Street details the events in 1978 that are described as the birth of performance poetry as an American regional avant-garde joining the activity of the body to the psychic power of utterance and intent.

The conceptual process ... seems impossible to pull off. There was no money, and it used 'found' text and 'street' actors ... filled with existential angst living on the fringes of society.

She never claimed close ties to the feminist movement, but feminists reportedly consider her work to contain powerful statements about the disparity caused by race and gender in the United States. The images in her poetry are womanly and challenge what is politically correct according to the feminist dictum of the time, and they reflect a protest against the complacency and inaction of artists and non-conformists. She had close ties with Gloria E. Anzaldúa, whose book Borderlands/La Frontera is considered a major work in Chicana feminist theory, Ricardo Sánchez, and raúlrsalinas, often performing with them at Resistencia Bookstore and elsewhere. During the Annual Polish American Historical Association (PAHA) conference in Washington, D.C. in 2008, Gorski read from "Mexico Solo", a long prose poem that she used to introduce how Polish Americans are more closely related to all 'hyphenated' minority cultures than to the majority American WASP culture.

On the conference panel, Polish American poets Stephen Lewandowski and Joseph Lisowski discussed how blatant discrimination and negative stereotyping circulated by Polish jokes plagued their childhoods. She calls these persecuted groups "invisible minorities" in the United States because they are often of European heritage. Gorski's writing and career aligns with the struggles of all disadvantaged groups suffering from the hidden class warfare inside American society, and for this she has been called the "American Mayakovsky" from whom her motto "poetry is a hammer" is adapted.

=== Performance poet ===
When Bob Holman first heard an audio cassette of Gorski with East of Eden Band, he told New York poet Michael Vecchio that it was the best band he had heard. Vecchio is one of those featured in the Poets Audio Anthology Project, Vol. II, along with Isabella Russell-Ides and many other performing poets Gorski collected and produced. Jazz writers and radio programmers were intrigued with poetry and music collaboration, but few practitioners dedicated their careers to doing only oral poetry and music, as did Gorski. Gorski has called herself a "performance poet" in press releases and interviews when describing what she did with East of Eden. She first coined the term "performance poetry" to name her style of writing poetry for oral presentation, instead of for print publication, in a 1981 press release. The term was widely adopted to name the new genre by later practitioners in the mid-1980s, which is distinct within and parallel to the following practices: spoken word, slam, poetry readings, performed poetry, and performance art.

=== Populist writer ===
Gorski sees poets in American society as a disenfranchised minority group with a history of prosecution by the American government for obscenity when exercising the freedom of speech. "Experimental and avant-garde artists and poets were demonized during the early 1990s by the efforts of a conservative agenda to eliminate funding for the National Endowment for the Arts (NEA) during the late 1980s and to remove art studies from primary education."

She produced and funded projects to distribute works of performance-oriented literature outside the "mainstream". She also promoted and nurtured literature opposed to the establishment. She was a founding writer for The Austin Chronicle in 1980 initiating and naming the Litera column that discussed readings, books, and other matters of importance related to non-mainstream, alternative, and small press literature, especially poetry.

=== Scholar ===
After her career in performance poetry during the 1980s, Gorski entered graduate school in the University of Louisiana at Lafayette and was awarded a doctorate, Ph.D. in Creative Writing, in 2001. In 2003–04, Gorski lectured on minority American literature at the University of Wrocław in Poland as a Fulbright Fellow and spent five months traveling to various locations, including Ukraine. While backstage at Bob Dylan's concert in Prague, she met Václav Havel. She made an appearance at the Cafe Krzysztofory in Kraków in 2004 for the United States Embassy and the French Institute in Kraków before returning to the United States.

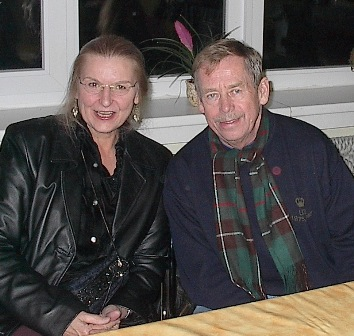
Gorski with Václav Havel

== Accomplishments ==
She coined the term "Performance Poetry" in the early 1980s after initiating and writing the "Litera" column for the Austin Chronicle in an effort to distinguish her performed poetry from performance art. She was also one of the founding writers on the Austin Chronicle, which helped to promote the vibrant "music capital of the world" that Austin, the capital of Texas, had become. Along with the growth of the music scene, a multi-ethnic theater, literature, and art community began to coalesce during the 1970s. This is the environment from which Gorski's work grew from its mysterious underground, what she calls a "pedestrian avant-garde".

Gorski's live broadcast performances on KUT-FM were recorded and distributed to radio stations internationally. They became part of the 1980s Indie audio cassette/radio station network offering alternatives to commercial music. Her literature-based broadcast audio increased the popularity of performance poetry, the genre she named to describe her own work: literature-based poetry written for performance only and not for print publication.

East of Eden, formed of professional jazz musicians, was successful because the music and poetry were melded together exclusively for performance. Gorski's spoken vocals have been described as bringing her "eerie" voicing as close to singing as possible without actually singing. The compositions written for each poem by D'Jalma Garnier ranged from jazz to country and western to rock and roll

== Style ==
Unlike the Beats, Gorski wrote her stylized narrative and moody lyrical poetry only for performance with the music composed by D'Jalma Garnier specifically for each poem. The poetry was meant for audio distribution only, especially for the radio (as opposed to print). Her radical art school background influenced her fondness for performance text and the concept behind the manner of distribution. Though she received a degree in painting from the Nova Scotia College of Art and Design (NSCAD) in Canada, she did not like the elitism of the gallery circuit. She transferred her love of images into a poetics that also incorporated the anti-capitalist, socialist un-doings found in performance art and conceptual art. Gorski, along with Vito Acconci, is considered one of the most notable graduates of NSCAD. She was directly influenced by Allen Ginsberg's "Howl". They had a friendly enmity after he jeered one of her early readings at Naropa University during the Jack Kerouac Disembodied Poetics Conference in the 1980s.

One of her early idols was Bob Dylan because she admired the "surreal images and obscured meanings in a language that rolled off the tongue." The passion and flow in the vocals matched those she heard on reel-to-reel tapes by Dylan Thomas, the Welsh poet who initially inspired her. Bob Dylan came to Gorski's final reading/performance in Austin at the Mexic-Arte Museum's Acoustic Festival in late 1992 after his concert at the Austin Opry House.

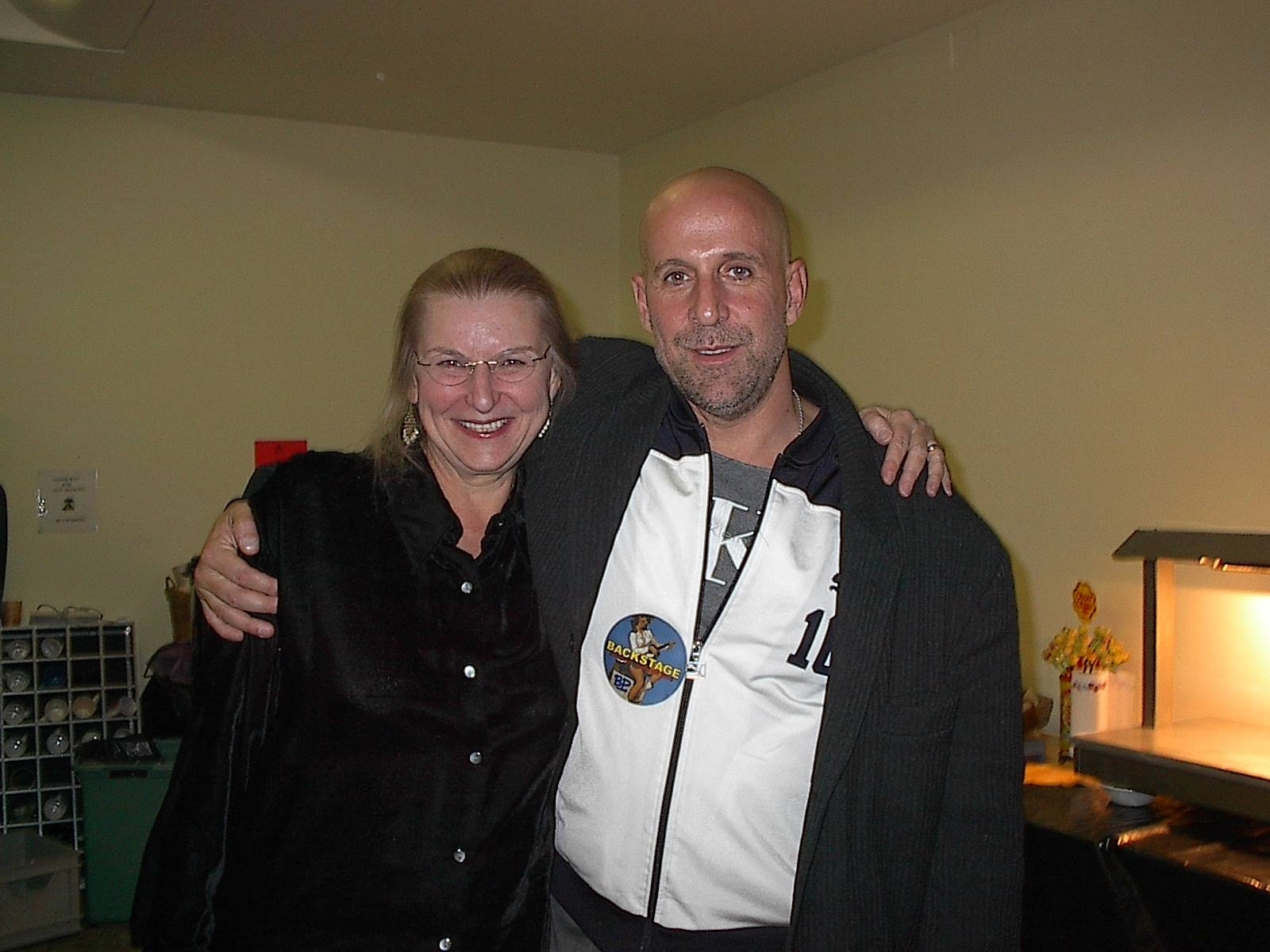
Gorski with Swedish actor Peter Stormare in Prague, Czech Republic, backstage at Bob Dylan's concert in October 2003

== Publications and recordings ==
The first publication of her performance poems is titled Snatches of the Visible Unreal from Backyard Press, which is also the title of her first audio cassette recording. Another chapbook titled Polish Gypsy with Ghost contains a vinyl recording. The second audio cassette release is titled East of Eden Band, for which Gorski used the name Hedwig G-G. Her poems received music lyric awards, rather than literature awards, though she never sang. In a career that eschewed elitism, she used her own success to help produce and promote the recording of other non-academic vocal poets including raúlrsalinas, Roxy Gordon, and Joy Cole. Several other print collections of poetry were produced in limited additions, including Early breakfast with Hedwig Gorski and The East of Eden Band Songbook. A remastered CD, containing a selection of radio recordings by Gorski and East of Eden from live broadcasts was released in 2009, called Send in the Clown.

The archival and remastered recordings by Hedwig Gorski® and East of Eden Band along with a radio drama, Thirteen Donuts, which she wrote and directed for KRVS-FM and simulcast on the web, are available for download on iTunes. A more extensive listing of creative and scholarly publications and productions by the artist-poet is available online (see Hedwig Gorski's online CV with permission request from official website).

== Awards ==
- 2011 Finalist in 2011 National Poetry Series
- 2004 Southern Artistry Award
- 2003 Fulbright Scholar at University of Wroclaw, Poland
- 2002 Artist Fellowship in Audio Media, Louisiana Division of the Arts
- 2001 Robert and Bernice Webb Award for Excellence in Graduate Teaching – Advanced Level. Department of English, University of Louisiana
- 2001 National Audio Theatre Festivals Script Writing Competition, for Thirteen Donuts
- 1994 Producer Fellowship from Corporation for Public Broadcasting at WWOZ, New Orleans
- 1990 Commemoration of International Women's Day Certificate on the occasion of a University Co-Op Book Signing Honoring Women Authors
- 1987 Best Use of Language Judges Award for performance poem "Mexico Solo" in Austin Music Umbrella Annual Songwriters Competition
- 1986 Honorable Mention for performance poem "Glitter Streets" in Austin Music Umbrella Annual Songwriters Competition

== Works ==
=== Audio recordings ===
- Hedwig Gorski Performance Poetry. CD. Original Broadcast on Liveset KUT-FM. Performed with East of Eden Band and D'Jalma Garnier. Austin, TX.
- 13 Donuts. CD. Original Broadcast Oct. 13, 2000 on KRVS-FM. Performed by Honors Players, U of Louisiana. Oct. 13, 2010.
- "Slow Paradise". Podcast by Mongo. Show Number 962. Wed., September 29, 2010."
- "To My Last Idol Bob Dylan". Podcast by Mongo. Show Number 714. Wed., June 9, 2010.
- "Mexico Solo". Podcast by Mongo. Show Number 623. Mon., November 9, 2009.
- Send in the Clown. Selected Performance Poetry from Live Radio Broadcasts. CD 2009
- East of Eden Band. KUT-FM Live Set. Recording and broadcast, University of Texas at Austin 1985
- "Intellectual Love", "Slow Paradise", "There's Always Something That Can Make You Happy", all from East of Eden's album Intimacies. KUT-FM Live Set. Recording and broadcast. University of Texas at Austin 1986
- Snatches of the Visible Unreal. Duets by Hedwig Gorski and D'Jalma Garnier. Directed by Morgan Guidry, 1984

=== Video recordings ===
- "Teenager in Nova Scotia." Video Illustrated Poetry. Producer PerfectoMedia 2010
- "Rising Melodic Chords." Poem by Hedwig Gorski Deconstructed by Composer D'Jalma Garnier 2008
- "Teenager in Nova Scotia." Dial-A-Poet Series. Dir. Karen Minzer. Fort Worth 1990

=== Theater ===
- Thirteen Donuts. By Hedwig Gorski. Dir. William Davies. Perf. Honors Players. KRVS-FM Radio, Lafayette. LouisianaRadio.com. Oct. 13, 2000.
- Booby, Mama!. By Hedwig Gorski. Dir. Hedwig Gorski. Perf. Ex Troupe. InterArt Works, Austin. March–April 1977.

== Publications ==
=== Poetry ===
- Hi to Heaven: Best-Loved Performance Poems in English & Polish. Trans. by Janusz Zalewski. 2015. Second Edition 2022.
- Poetique: Speak-Songbook. College Station: Slough P, Feb. 2010. ISBN 978-0-9827342-0-9. Semi-finalist for Balcones Prize (with CD).
- Deconstruction of Rising Melodic Chords, Hedwig Gorski Poem. Composer, D'Jalma Garnier. Toxic Poetry. Second Issue. Exhibition No. 2. Jan. 2010.
- "Drunken Savior," "Mood Indigo." Toxic Poetry. Premier Issue. Exhibition No. 1. Aug. 2009.
- Karawane. No.10. Excerpts from neo-verse drama poem for voices Booby, Mama! 2009. (PDF)
- "Mexico Solo." Polish American Historical Association Conference. Commemorative Broadside. Ed. Janusz Zalewski. 2008.
- "White Colonnade Façade." Art Mag 29. Las Vegas: Limited Editions P, 2006.
- "Zawsze jest coś, co może uczynić cię szczęśliwym." Trans. Janusz Zalewski. Novo Okolica Poetów, 18–19. Rzeszów: 2005, 58–60.
- Polish Gypsy with Ghost. Austin: Shinebone P, 1993.
- "Slow Paradise." Poem Broadside. Photo by Mark Christal. Austin: Shinebone P, 1992.
- Early Breakfast with Hedwig Gorski. Austin: Perfection Productions, 1992.
- Snatches of the Visible Unreal. Austin: Backyard P, 1991.

=== Drama ===
- The Waste Land Scripted for 44 Voices. Jadzia Books. 2018.
- Beasts and Saints: One-Act Play. Jadzia Books. 2015.
- 13 Donuts: An Original Radio Drama with a Multi-Cultural Twist. Jadzia Books. 2015.
- Booby, Mama!: Surreal Cut-Up Spoken Word, 1977. Jadzia Books. 2015.
- Thirteen Donuts. National Audio Theatre Festivals Annual Scriptbook 2001. Ed. Brian Price. Hempstead: NATF, 2001. 87–105.

=== Memoir ===
- Intoxication: Heathcliff on Powell Street. College Station, TX: Slough P, 2007, 2009.
