= Almost You =

1985 film

- Directed by: Adam Brooks
- Starring: Brooke Adams; Griffin Dunne
- Music by: Jonathan Elias
- Distributed by: 20th Century Fox
- Release dates: September 22, 1984 (MVFF); March 29, 1985 (United States)
- Running time: 97 minutes
- Country: United States
- Language: English
- Budget: $1 million
- Box office: $95,000

Almost You is a 1984 American romantic comedy film directed by Adam Brooks and starring Brooke Adams and Griffin Dunne. It won the Special Jury Prize at the 1985 Sundance Film Festival.

Almost You was Brooks' first film as director. The screenplay was written by Mark Horowitz.

== Premise ==
Complications arise when a man and woman who have been having an affair attend a dinner party with their spouses and friends.

== Cast ==
- Brooke Adams as Erica Boyer
- Griffin Dunne as Alex Boyer
- Karen Young as Lisa Willoughby
- Marty Watt as Kevin Danzig
- Christine Estabrook as Maggie
- Dana Delany as Susan McCall
- Laura Dean as Jeannie
- Josh Mostel as David
- Miguel Pinero as Ralph
- Daryl Edwards as Sal
- Mark Metcalf as Andrews
- Seth Allen as Frank Rose
- Joe Silver as Uncle Stu
- Joe Leon as Uncle Mel
- Harvey Waldman as The Director
- Spalding Gray as Travel Agent
- Suzan Hughes as The Bartender
- Wendy Creed as The Waitress
- Suzzy Roche as The Receptionist
- Steve DeLuca as Policeman #1
- Jim Phelan as Policeman #2
