= Gez =

Gez or GEZ may refer to:

== People ==
- Gez Varley, British musician
- Gez Walsh, English writer

== Places ==
- Gez, Bayburt, Turkey
- Gez, Hautes-Pyrénées, France

== Other uses ==
- Geʽez, a Semitic language native to Eritrea and Ethiopia
- Gebühreneinzugszentrale der öffentlich-rechtlichen Rundfunkanstalten in der Bundesrepublik Deutschland (transl. Fee Collection Center of the Public Broadcasting Companies in the Federal Republic of Germany), the former collecting agency of West Germany (and, later, Germany), 1976–2013
- Shelbyville Municipal Airport (Indiana)
