= Isabella Russell-Ides =

American dramatist

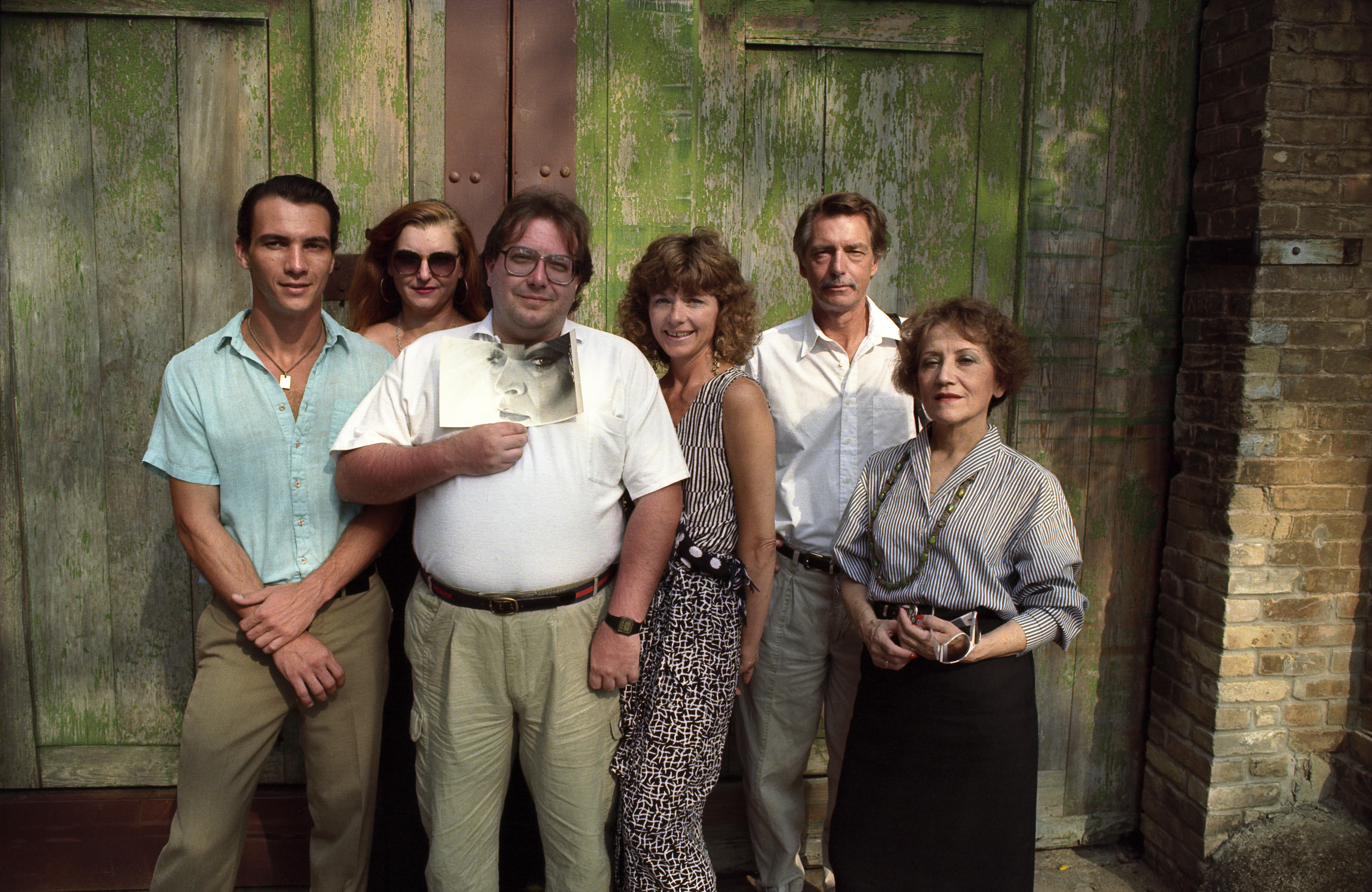
- Photo by Mark Christal. Poets from Austin Poets Audio Anthology Project, Vol. II, Naked Children, left to right: Michael Vecchio, Hedwig Gorski, Phillip T. Stephens, Isabella Russell-Ides, David Wevill, Cecilia Bustamante. Stephens holds a photo of Joy Cole who had died at the time and was included on the tape.
- Born: January 24, 1948 (age 78); United States
- Citizenship: United States
- Occupations: Poet, playwright, novelist
- Writing career
- Language: English
- Genres: Poetry, theatre, fiction

Isabella Russell-Ides (born January 24, 1948) is an American poet, playwright, and novelist. She is the author of two novels of speculative fiction: White Monkey Chronicles and The Godma's Daughters, several award-winning plays, and one book of poetry: Getting Dangerously Close To Myself. Her first play, a country western musical, Nashville Road, premiered in Austin, Texas at Center Stage on Sixth Street (co-written with Rod Russell-Ides). She was a notable voice in the Austin performance poetry scene in the 1980s. Her two-woman show, Jo & Louisa (May Alcott), won a 2019 DFW Critics Forum Award for Outstanding New Play. Coco & Gigi, her existential and feminist take on Waiting for Godot, won the 2008 DFW Critics Forum Award for Outstanding New Play and Outstanding Ensemble. She has also received critical acclaim for her works, Leonard's Car ("Outstanding New Play", 2009 Nora's Playhouse, NYC), Fortune Cookie Smash (2007 Best of Fest, Frontera). She is noted for the poetic and heightened language of her texts.

== The Godma's Daughters ==
Winner of the International Book Award for Visionary Fiction and the IndieReader Highest Approval "What a profound novel . . .This lyrical masterpiece in the form of literary fiction is a story of borders and bullies; of simple magnificence, as well as malevolent manipulation spanning lifetimes. It is also the story of laughingly falling in love again and again with Life, with a boy, and with a burro." C.S. Holmes for IndieReader The Godma's Daughters is a tale that travels from the Texas/Mexico border to the heart of an ancient Maya mystery in the Yucatán. Ixmukáhne, the Maya Goddess is angry because her daughter was destroyed to create the Earth. In this epic tale of competing shamans, the Godma is waiting for a heroine from the future. She's been waiting two-thousand years.

== White Monkey Chronicles: The Complete Trilogy ==
Her debut novel, White Monkey Chronicles: The Complete Trilogy, winner of The Jemma Prize for Speculative Fiction, Finalist International Book Award Visionary Fiction. Published under the pen name Isabella Ides, (March 2018, Lowell Street Press), the novel features an undocumented baby god, protected by a super hero monkey, aka Lord Hanuman, disguised as a plush toy, a rogue order of nuns in Humboldt County, and an inquisition by the Cardinals of the One True Church. This deeply feminist and philosophical mash up of genres is ultimately a divine comedy. Many elements of the author's Catholic childhood meander through this chronicle based on her award-winning play The Early Education of Conrad Eppler. Radio journalist Barbara J. Austin writes: "It's like Douglas Adams, Kurt Vonnegut, J.K. Rowling and Gloria Steinem got drunk one night and decided to write a book!" Critic Alexandra Bonifield gives the novel five stars. "Scintillating, sweeping, and sophisticated, this miraculous tale careens in kaleidoscopic, galaxy-spinning turns."

== Critical praise for her plays ==
"Isabella Russell-Ides persists as one of the most expressive, evocative and routinely ignored playwrights in our N. Texas region’s ‘money and prestige’ theater circles. She pens unique, stage-worthy, critically acclaimed entertainments like Leonard's Car, Coco & Gigi and Cenote that feature fascinating characters, vivid language and imagery and sustainable sustenance for the soul and mind," according to HowlRound theatre critic, Alexandra Bonifield.

== Coco & Gigi ==
In this existential parlay, four characters benched in a Suzan-Lori Park, deal with taxes, angst, and lost mittens. "The writing vies with Beckett's own," wrote Lawson Taitte of her, "double-trouble triumph," Coco & Gigi, winner of the Outstanding New Play, DFW Critics Forum Award.

== Jo & Louisa ==
The iconic Jo March of Little Women confronts her author Louisa May Alcott in this play about gender, remakes, and makeovers. Winner of the Outstanding New Play, DFW Critics Forum Awards. "Now you might think the character who became the beloved model for bright, ambitious girls everywhere might be grateful to her creator. You’ve got another thing coming in this tumultuous confrontation." Martha Heimburg, Theater Jones " "JO & LOUISA is funny and wise and thought provoking, and forces you to look anew at Little Women, and its author, through rainbow-colored glasses. This two-hander bounces along with thoughtful discussions of androgyny, sexual labels and gender identity, suffused with a literary intelligence that never condescends."

== The Early Education of Conrad Eppler ==
This cosmic, fantasy adventure was produced by Echo Theatre in 2012. The Early Education of Conrad Eppler was a winner of Echo Theatre's national SHOUT OUT for new works from women playwrights. Clips from the original production can be found on YouTube.

== Lydie Marland in the Afterlife ==
In 2013 WingSpan Theatre produced her newest work Lydie Marland in the Afterlife to critical applause. The lights come up on the heroine returning to consciousness shortly after her death, looking worse for wear and tear, an octogenarian in a turban and thrift-shop overcoat. Lydie was vagabond for decades after the economic downfall and death of her oil-baron husband, the former Governor of Oklahoma, EW Marland. See also EW Marland and "The Ends of the Earth".

== The poet ==
Russell-Ides is also a published poet, having written Getting Dangerously Close To Myself (Slough Press). She recorded readings of several poems for the Austin Poets Audio Anthology Project, Vol. II, titled Naked Children, produced by media poet Hedwig Gorski's Perfection Productions in the 1980s. An innovative performance poet, Isabella Russell-Ides was notable presence in the "Third Coast Renaissance" in Austin, Texas.
