= Sink estate =

British council estate with social problems

A sink estate is a British term used for a council housing estate with high levels of social problems, particularly crime. The word is often used in certain former British colonies.

== Origin ==
The phrase came into usage in the 1980s, and was used by then-Prime Minister Tony Blair in 1998, when he referred to "so-called sink estates" in a speech, such as the since-demolished Aylesbury Estate.

Writing in The Guardian in 2016, Victoria Pinoncely has argued that the term reinforces a sense of segregation, suggesting that "starved" would be a better term to describe estates that are receiving minimal investment in amenities, infrastructure, and public spaces. She cited the regeneration of the Packington Estate in Islington and the Ocean estate in Tower Hamlets as examples of how estates can be revitalised with increased public investment.

== Crime ==
Sink estates are often associated with crime and programmes to regenerate these estates include crime-reduction strategies, such as the below listed by the New Statesman:

- In one estate meetings were held three times weekly involving all the agencies that needed to share information. Coordination improved and the estate was transformed.
- In another Lambeth estate a police sergeant familiar with the area organised job fairs, put gang members in touch with employers willing to take on those with criminal records. Many were brought out of crime and into honest work.
- In another estate arson stopped after "local lads" had played football with a local fire brigade team.

The writer and social activist Byron Vincent has referred to himself as coming from a sink estate, and spoken about his experiences with being bullied whilst young, and later spells of drug addiction and homelessness. He has argued that locating people with social and fiscal problems in the same area is "an idiotic idea that is destined to create a culture of perpetually spiralling criminality.

A 2014 report by the right-wing conservative think tank Policy Exchange, The Estate We're In, called on the Government to set up an "Estate Recovery Board" to tackle problems with gang crime, unemployment, truancy and domestic violence.
