= David Jewell =

David Jewell may refer to:

- David Jewell (headmaster)
- David Jewell (poet)
