= Richard Cambridge =

Richard Cambridge may refer to:

- Richard Cambridge (actor), British actor
- Richard Cambridge (poet), American poet
- Richard Owen Cambridge (1717–1802), British poet
