= Gary Mex Glazner =

American poet (born 1957)

Gary Mex Glazner (born 1957), is a poet and author. He was the Managing Director of the Bowery Poetry Club in New York City, 2007 to 2010.

In 1990, Glazner working as a florist in San Francisco. As poet and organizer in that city's ever-evolving spoken word community, he was instrumental in organizing the first ever National Poetry Slam, which featured poets from San Francisco, Chicago and New York City. In the book Words in Your Face: A Guided Tour Through Twenty Years of the New York City Poetry Slam, author Cristin O'Keefe Aptowicz wrote:

...[N]either Chicago-based poetry slam creator Marc Smith nor Bob Holman of the Nuyorican organized the first National Poetry Slam. The first "Nationals Slammaster" was a San Francisco poet-florist named Gary Mex Glazner. Stocky, tan and impish with a quick and crooked smile, Glazner resembled your favorite bartender more than poetry-organizing guru. But in 1990, it was Glazner, already famous for his unpredictable ideas for championing poetry, who came up with the idea of using San Francisco's National Poetry Festival as the backdrop for the first National Poetry Slam."

To promote the first National Poetry Slam, Glazner used such "unpredictable" ideas as hiring a circus barker outside of the venues in which the slams were happening "like at the freak show at Coney Island", selling hot dogs from a vendor during the slam, and the use of a "PoJ Kit," which Glazner described as a mobile DJ unit wherein poets can perform and broadcast their poems onto the street while being driven around in Glazner's car.

Glazner's relationship continued with the Poetry Slam movement. In 1993, he helped organize the fourth National Poetry Slam held in San Francisco again. In 2000, he organized the "Slam America" bus tour, which involved "38 live poetry shows in 32 cities over 30 days with more than 100 poets." The poets in tour would perform and tour together in various "legs" as the tour bus as they traveled to the 2000 National Poetry Slam held in Providence, RI. The tour resulted in the documentary, "Busload of Poets."

Glazner also edited the anthology Poetry Slam: The Competitive Art of Spoken Word, which was published by Manic D Press in 2000. The book "documents 10 years of poetry slams, with 100 poems from national slam champions and a dozen essays on how to run a slam, winning strategies, tips for memorizing poems, and more."

In addition to his work in the Poetry Slam community, Glazner has authored four books: 2002's Ears on Fire: Snapshot Essays in a World of Poets (La Alameda Press), 2005's How to Make a Living as a Poet (Soft Skull Press), 2006's How to Make a Life as a Poet (Soft Skull Press), and 2014's Dementia Arts: Celebrating Creativity in Eldercare (Health Professions Press).

Glazner was poet-in-residence at Desert Academy in Santa Fe, New Mexico, 2005–2006. His Precision Poetry Drill Team was featured on National Public Radio's All Things Considered:

Glazner is the founder and Executive Director of the "Alzheimer's Poetry Project" In 2013 the Alzheimer's Poetry Project was the recipient of the "Rosalinde Gilbert Innovations in Alzheimer’s Disease Caregiving Legacy Award." In 2012, the Alzheimer's Poetry Project was the recipient of the MetLife Foundation Creativity and Aging in America Leadership Award in the category of Community Engagement. The award was administered by the National Center for Creative Aging. In 2018, Glazner was the co-recipient of the International Leadership in Arts and Health Award, administered by the Australian Centre for Arts and Health.

In 2020, in response to COVID-19, Glazner began to use robots to deliver poetry programs and creativity training to help reduce social isolation of elders in nursing homes.

In 2024, Glazner was named Poet-in-Residence for Caledonia Senior Living & Memory Care Chicago

Glazner currently lives in Chicago, Illinois.

== Works ==
- Glazner, Gary. Poetry Slam: The Competitive Art of Performance Poetry, San Francisco; Manic D Press, 2000.
- Glazner, Gary. Ears on Fire: Snapshot Essays in a World of Poets, New Mexico; La Alameda Press, 2003.
- Glazner, Gary. Sparking Memories: The Alzheimer's Poetry Project Anthology, Santa Fe, Poem Factory, 2005.
- Glazner, Gary. How to Make a Living as a Poet, New York; SoftSkull Press, 2005
- Glazner, Gary. How to Make a Life as a Poet, New York; SoftSkull Press, 2007.
- Glazner, Gary. Nútreme Hoy (Nurture me Now) The Alzheimer's Poetry Project Spanish Anthology, Santa Fe, Poem Factory, 2010.
- Glazner, Gary. Dementia Arts: Celebrating Creativity in Eldercare, Baltimore, Health Professios Press, 2014.

== Anthologies ==
- Revival: Spoken Work from Lollapalooza 94, edited by Juliette Torrez et al., San Francisco, Manic D Press, 1995
- Complete Idiot's Guide to Writing Poetry, Nikki Moustaki, New York, Alpha (Penguin Group), 2001
- An Eye For An Eye Makes The Whole World Blind: Poets on 9/11 edited by Michael Parenti, Allen Cohen, and Clive Matson, Oakland, Regent Press 2002
- Birth of the Chess Queen: A History, Marilyn Yalom, New York, HarperCollins, 2004
- The Complete Idiot's Guide to Slam Poetry edited by Marc Smith and Joe Kraynak, New York, Alpha (Penguin Group), 2004
- Bowery Bartenders Big Book of Poems edited by Bob Holman, New York; Bowery Books, 2005
- The Spoken Word Revolution Redux edited by Mark Eleveld, Naperville, Sourcebooks MediaFusion, 2007
- The Customer Is Always Wrong: The Retail Chronicles edited by Jeff Martin, New York; Soft Skull Press, 2008
- JAMA: The Journal of the American Medical Association, peer-reviewed medical journal, 2018; 320(22):2294-2295.
- Dementia Arts Mapping: observational methods for documenting impacts of poetry and recreation in care settings, London; Journal of Arts and Health, 2023.

== See also ==
- List of performance poets
- Poetry slam
