= Talpa, Texas =

- Unincorporated community
- Location within Texas Location within the United States
- Coordinates: 31°46′36″N 99°42′34″W
- Country: United States
- State: Texas
- County: Coleman
- Elevation: 1,962 ft (598 m)
- Time zone: UTC-6 (Central (CST))
  - Summer (DST): UTC-5 (CDT)
- Postal code: 76882
- Area code: 325
- GNIS feature ID: 1348210

Talpa is an unincorporated community in Coleman County, Texas, United States. According to the Handbook of Texas, the community had an estimated population of 127 in 2000.

== History ==
Talpa was said to be named for a large catalpa tree in the area. Its status as a switch station on the Santa Fe Railroad caused the town to develop into a farmer's market. There were 254 people served by 16 businesses in 1940, which went down to 122 residents, three businesses, and a post office in 1980. The population increased slightly to 127 residents from 1990 through 2000.

Although it is unincorporated, Talpa has a post office with the zip code of 76882.

On March 17, 2008, an EF0 tornado struck Talpa and was reported by an off-duty NWS employee. On April 10, 1979, an F3 tornado was recorded near Talpa, causing extensive damage to houses but causing no injuries.

== Geography ==
Talpa is located along U.S. Highway 67 in western Coleman County, less than 20 miles from Ballinger to the west and Coleman to the east. It is also on Farm to Market Road 2132 and Texas State Highway 153. It is on Recreational Road 9 and Farm to Market Road 2134.

=== Climate ===
The climate in this area is characterized by hot, humid summers and generally mild to cool winters. According to the Köppen climate classification system, Talpa has a humid subtropical climate, abbreviated Cfa on climate maps.

== Education ==
Public education in the community of Talpa is provided by the Panther Creek Consolidated Independent School District.

On July 1, 1986, the Talpa Centennial Independent School District consolidated into the Mozelle Independent School District, which at that point was renamed Panther Creek.

== Notable person ==
- Roxy Gordon, poet, novelist and musician.
