= José Montalvo (writer) =

American poet

- Born: September 9, 1946; Piedras Negras, Coahuila, México
- Died: August 15, 1994 (aged 47)
- Occupations: Writer, poet

José Luis Montalvo (September 9, 1946 – August 15, 1994) was a Chicano writer, poet, and community activist.

== Biography ==
=== Early life ===
José Luis Montalvo was born on September 9, 1946, in Piedras Negras, Coahuila, México. He moved to San Antonio, Texas in 1959. He graduated from Fox Tech High School in 1966. He then joined the United States Air Force, where he was stationed in The Netherlands. In 1969, he was transferred to Laredo, Texas, where he was reborn a Chicano and began to get involved in political and community issues. He was honorably discharged from his military duties in 1971. He returned to San Antonio, where he attended San Antonio College and received a Bachelor of Arts degree from St. Mary's University in 1974.

=== Career ===
He ran for State Representative in 1974, under the Raza Unida Party.

He authored several books of poetry including Pensamientos Capturados (1977), ¡A MI QUE! (1983), Black Hat Poems (Slough Press 1987), and Welcome to My New World (Slough Press 1992). He has been described as the People's Poet, performing anywhere from his favorite local bars to universities around the country. Best known for his satirical take on the Texas Sesquicentennial, "What the Sasquash-centennial Means To Me!" (1986). His editor at ViAztlan was Rafael C. Castillo, a prominent writer and mentor to many Chicano writers. Jose at first balked at the massive editorial changes to his poem, but later acquiesced to them after Castillo explained the scope and focus of the poetic changes. The poem led to loss of city grant funding for the Chicano Arts journal, "ViAztlan".

During the 1980s, he became known to the Chicano world as The Black Hat Poet, the bearded Resistol cowboy hat-wearing, beer-drinking poet who wore starched blue jeans and a lizard earring, not the mental picture of what comes to mind when one thinks of a Chicano. Audiences especially enjoyed the humor in his writing and performances.

=== Death ===
He was diagnosed with colorectal cancer in July 1990 and battled his disease for three years. In addition to receiving traditional medical treatment, he pursued his own alternative treatment regimen consisting of vitamins, herbs, and a vegetarian diet. He died August 15, 1994, at the age of forty-seven.

== Bibliography ==
- Pensamientos Capturados (1971)
- ¡A MI QUE! (1983)
- Black Hat Poems(1987)
- Welcome to My New World (1992)
