= Slough Press =

American small press

Slough Press is an American small press publisher. They publish fiction, poetry, and essays. The press published authors from a variety of backgrounds and currently focuses on poets with a Chicano background.

== History ==
Poet Susan Bright and Chuck Taylor founded Slough Press in 1973 in Austin, Texas, and moved to El Paso briefly before returning to Austin. Bright left the press at this time and later founded Plain View Press. As of 2017, Slough Press was operating out of Austin with new publisher Christopher Carmona.

Writers on their roster include Ricardo Sánchez, Hedwig Gorski, and Christopher Carmona. Slough also published satirical Latino poet José Montalvo's collections Black Hat Poems (1987) and Welcome to My New World (1992).

== Publishing ==
- Hedwig Gorski. Intoxication: Heathcliff on Powell Street (2006). ISBN 978-1427604750
- Carmona, Christopher. Beat (2011). ISBN 978-0982734247
- Sánchez, Gabrielle H. The Fluid Chicano (2015). ISBN 978-0941720410
- Littledog, Pat. Afoot in a Field of Men, Special Anniversary Edition (2015). ISBN 978-0982734285
