= Babe Stovall =

American singer

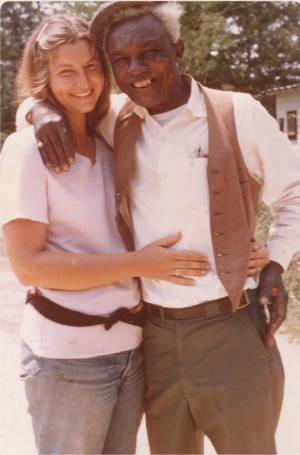
- Poet Hedwig Gorski with Babe Stovall on a 1973 trip to rural Mississippi. Stovall was arrested for carrying a fifth of whiskey in his back pocket, while jamming at the home of blues guitarist Roosevelt Holts, who lived in a dry county.

Background information
- Born: Jewell Stovall; October 14, 1907; Tylertown, Mississippi, U.S.
- Died: September 21, 1974 (aged 66) United States
- Genres: Delta blues
- Occupations: Musician, singer, guitarist
- Instruments: Vocals, guitar

Jewell Stovall, better known as Babe Stovall (October 14, 1907 – September 21, 1974), was an American Delta blues singer and guitarist.

Stovall was born in Tylertown, Mississippi, United States, in 1907, the youngest of eleven children (thus his nickname "Babe"). He learned to play the guitar by the age of eight, and his guitar playing style was influenced by Tommy Johnson, whom he had met in Mississippi around 1930. In 1964, he relocated to New Orleans, Louisiana, where he entertained on the streets, and in cafes and galleries of the French Quarter. Stovall frequently took young white musicians under his wing as apprentice performers, teaching them traditional country blues songs and guitar techniques. He variously played his guitar at the back of his neck, and hollered his song lyrics loudly for all in the vicinity to hear. In 1964 he recorded an album for Verve, titled Babe Stovall (which was re-released in 1990 on CD), and undertook more recordings in 1966, released as The Babe Stovall Story. His later work with Bob West resulted in The Old Ace: Mississippi Blues & Religious Songs, which was released on Arcola (2003). He was credited by some as the character inspiration behind Jerry Jeff Walker's, "Mr. Bojangles".

Stovall played on the college circuit, in addition to being the regular musician at the Dream Palace Bar on Frenchman Street, and The Quarum club in New Orleans. He also performed at the first five New Orleans Jazz & Heritage Festivals from 1970 up to the year of his death.

His death in 1974 was by natural causes.
