= Paño =

United States prison artwork

Paños are pen or pencil drawings on fabric, a form of prison artwork made in the Southwest United States created primarily by pintos, or Chicanos who are or have been incarcerated.

The first paños, made with pieces of bedsheets and pillowcases, were made in the 1930s. They were originally used to communicate messages. Since then, they became used for primarily artistic purposes, and are often made with handkerchiefs. Prisoners sometimes use paños to get favors. Themes made with the artwork include Catholic faith symbols, Chicano political movement imagery, and prison imagery.

Prisoners often mail their artwork to their families. Families who receive the art put them in a box or binder as a keepsake instead of framing them.

In the 1990s Governor of Texas Ann Richards created enrichment programs for prisons. Michael Hoinski of the Texas Monthly stated that they "had helped spawn a golden age of paño-making in Texas." The programs were ended during the terms of governors George W. Bush and Rick Perry, and paños are now prohibited in the Texas Department of Criminal Justice.
