= Michael Rudd =

Michael Rudd is a New Zealand performance poet. He won a number of poetry slams during the time he spent living in Australia, and was a finalist in the Poetry Olympics.

Rudd also organises poetry events. He established numerous poetry reading and open mic nights over the years, around Auckland in NZ and in Melbourne and Sydney in Australia.

He has been the MC for the Going West Poetry Slam, which has been running annually in West Auckland since 2004, and organised the first New Zealand National Poetry Slam.
