= Adam Brooks (filmmaker) =

Canadian filmmaker

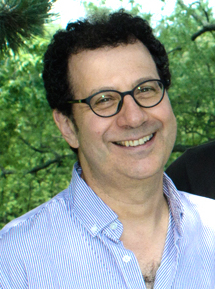
- Brooks in 2012
- Born: September 3, 1956 (age 68); Toronto, Ontario, Canada
- Occupation(s): Director, screenwriter, actor

Adam Brooks (born September 3, 1956) is a Canadian film director, screenwriter, and actor. He is best known for writing and directing Definitely, Maybe (2008) and for writing screenplays for French Kiss (1995), Wimbledon (2004), and Bridget Jones: The Edge of Reason (2004). His first film as a writer-director Almost You won the Jury Prize at the Sundance Film Festival in 1985.

Brooks served as a council member of the Writers Guild of America East and is currently on the board of the Writers Guild of America East Foundation. He also teaches film at the Columbia University Graduate School of the Arts. Brooks lives in New York City.

== Filmography ==
Year	Title	Director	Writer
1984	Almost You	Yes	No
1987	Red Riding Hood	Yes	No
1995	French Kiss	No	Yes
1998	Beloved	No	Yes
1998	Practical Magic	No	Yes
2001	The Invisible Circus	Yes	Yes
2004	Wimbledon	No	Yes
2004	Bridget Jones: The Edge of Reason	No	Yes
2008	Definitely, Maybe	Yes	Yes
2018	Nappily Ever After	No	Yes
2025	The Life List	Yes	Yes

== Honors and awards ==
- 1985 Sundance Film Festival Special Jury Prize for Almost You
- 1998 Golden Satellite Award nomination for Best Motion Picture Screenplay Adaption for Beloved
