= Pinto (subculture) =

Member of a Chicano subculture

Pinto or Pinta is a member of a Chicano subculture of people who are or have been incarcerated. It is an in-group moniker used to distinguish oneself from the general prison population or from "model inmates." It is a term which embraces the oppositional elements of being a Convicto. The term came from a bilingual play on the Spanish word for penitencia (penitence), since pintos and pintas are people who have spent time in penitentiaries. The term has also been traced to the Spanish word Pintao (Estar pintado--to be painted, in this case tattooed).

The term is usually used for prison veterans of older age rather than for youths. Scholar Avelardo Valdez states in a study of Mexican-American prison youth, that the pinto is a prison veteran who "is seen by many as having a highly disciplined code of conduct and a philosophy of life attuned to the values of many street-oriented young men," which attracts young men to follow his leadership. Valdez states that the pinto or prison veteran has "warrior-like status within the street culture of San Antonio's barrios." Language used by pintos (caló) has been described as distinct from other Chicano dialects.

The low socioeconomic status of a large percentage of Chicanos in the United States and the lack of equal opportunities in education and employment introduces many Chicanos to this subculture. Scholar Santiago Vidales writes that "Pinto and Pinta subculture comes out of the lived experiences of incarcerated Xicanx people."

== Criminalization in prisons ==
Police officers, prosecutors, prison guards, judges, in the United States criminalize, or assign criminality or deviance, to Chicano and Latino men and women based on certain appearances. Once incarcerated, other prisoners do this as well. Chicano men endure this criminalization at a heightened rate and are "the largest segment of the diverse U.S. Latino prison population conflated into the U.S. Department of Justice term 'Hispanic.'" Chicano tatuajes or body tattooing, which are distinguished by their own unique style and iconography, become a marker of Chicano criminality for the pinto subject, as argued by scholar B. V. Olguín, who embrace their oppositional status through the act rather than become "model inmates."

Chicano tattooing in prison or tatuteando, reflect the colonized yet oppositional (non-assimilationist) condition of the Chicano people in the United States, argues Olguín, who are systematically criminalized, arrested, incarcerated, and then exploited for labor whether that be in the textile or agricultural industries, or for any other purpose the state deems necessary, such as "dog boys," in which the Texas Department of Corrections used "prisoners to mimic an escape in order to be hunted down by prison bloodhounds and mounted guards as a training exercise for the killer dogs and entertainment for the guards and their guests." Tatuteando are illegal in prison and are penalized by police, "as they do all forms of 'destruction of state property'," since prisoners are viewed as state property.

In his own experience as a pinto, raúlrsalinas notes that people who were caught engaging in tatuteando or if they had materials necessary to tattoo on them, were given a month in solitary confinement. This risk that pintos are willing to take, especially as the tattoos they receive are permanent markers of their transgressions within prison, illustrate their defiance to the prison industrial complex. As such, scholar B. V. Olguín states that "tatuajes represent a victory, a testament to the survival of the human spirit, that begins with a crime! As such, they unmask the hegemonic and inhumane function of jurisprudence." In an interview, Salinas summarizes the act:

Well clearly it's an act of defiance. First of all, it's illegal - 'How dare you break the rules!' It's made criminal. But to defy rules is to recognize that you are engaged in a psychological battle with the prison authorities, the guards. Similar to the intellectual's declaration that 'you can jail my body but you can't jail my mind,' the act of tattooing oneself, or soliciting an artist to tattoo you, is an act of defiance that declares: You can jail my body, but you can't control it; you can put me in solitary as punishment, but you can't take my tattoos away from me.' So it is an affront; it's a threat to the very notion of confinement, of detention. The designs that are created in these conditions, under insurmountable odds, threaten the whole system of incarceration because it shows ultimately that there are still ways to retain one's dignity.

== Art and literature ==
=== Art ===
Paño, a form of pinto arte (a caló term for male prisoner) using pen and pencil, developed in the 1930s, first using bed sheets and pillowcases as canvases. Paño has been described as rasquachismo, a Chicano worldview and artmaking method which makes the most from the least. Because of the situational context in which it is created, artists on paño artists are often unknown, even though their work may be featured in museums. However, as paño art has grown in popularity and has also inspired Chicano youth who have never been to prison to use the handkerchief as a canvas, "paño artists are careful to sign their pieces, whereas before they were largely anonymous."

A documentary on paño art entitled Paño Arte: Images from Inside was released for PBS in 1996, featuring artist Paul Sedillo, Manuel Moya, Jerry Tapia and others. Sedillo states how prison used to be a place he dreamed of going in his teenage years because he thought it would give him status, but has come to realize that this was a mistake and that it has only trapped him. Sedillo then reflects on the role being in prison has had on his art: "that's the only thing this place [prison] has done for me, is made me a better artist."

=== Writing ===
The pinto subculture was covered in a 1976 issue of Chicano magazine De Colores entitled "Los Pintos de America" by Pajarito Publications. Scholar Letticia Galindo has written about the pinta subculture. In a study on pinto poetry, Santiago Vidales states that "the concept of concientización, political awakening, is a key feature that emerges from the scholarship on Pinto poetry." Raúl Salinas' poem "A Trip Through the Mind Jail" in May 1970 ignited a campaign from radical literary critics for his release. Salinas had once been sentenced to five years in prison for the possession of five dollars' worth of marijuana.

Salinas' poem "La Loma" touches on themes that challenge the neoromantic portraits of the pachuco figure as a "defiant male warrior here," instead presenting "a more problematic portrait of Pachucos imprisoned by drug addiction and held captive by a phallocentric notion of empowerment (modeled as virility) that often leads to various forms of individual and collective self-destruction, including fratricide." However, rather than being "a self-denigrating diatribe against Pachucos," Salinas constructs the barrio as "a subaltern space where the legacy of colonialism continues to manifest itself through tragic, seemingly senseless but ultimately significant episodes of internecine violence."

== Notable figures ==
- Modesta Avila (1867 or 1869–1891), was an American protester in Orange County, California, who became the county's first convicted felon and first state prisoner. Today, Avila is considered to be an important figure in local legend and has been cited as a "folklore heroine" for Latinos in the county.
- Jimmy Santiago Baca is a Chicano-American poet and writer. When he was twenty-one he was convicted on charges of drug possession and incarcerated. He served six and a half years in prison, three of them in isolation. Baca's poetry has been cited as "exposing and contesting the ontological, social, political, and material violence of the U.S. prison regime."
- Judy Lucero, was a Chicana prisoner poet, cited as a legend among Latina feminists. Lucero had a particularly tough life, becoming a heroin addict after being introduced to drugs at the age of eleven by one of her stepfathers, losing two children and dying in prison at the age of 28 from a brain hemorrhage.
- raúlrsalinas, also known as Raúl R. Salinas, (1934–2008) was a Xicanindio poet, artist, and activist in the prisoner-rights movement. Salinas is quoted as saying "sometimes it is easier for people out in the free world to understand what American prisons represent if they equate them to concentration camps, where prisoners are systematically beaten, forced to work, and even killed." Work by Salinas includes Viaje/Trip, East of the Freeway (1995), Un Trip Through The Mind Jail (1999), Indio Trails: A Xicano Odyssey through Indian Country (2006), spoken word CDs Red Arc: A Call for Liberacion con Salsa y Cool (2005), Beyond the BEATen Path (2001), and Los Many Mundos of raúlrsalinas: Un Poetic Jazz Viaje con Friends (2000), and a collection of his essays raúlsalinas and the Jail Machine: My Weapon is My Pen (2006) A documentary film was also made about his life entitled Raúl Salinas and the Poetry of Liberation.
- Ricardo Sánchez (1941–1995) was a high school dropout and ex-convict who gave poetic voice to the Chicano protest movement of the 1970s. He became an important figure in Chicano literature. In his poem, "Indict Amerika," Sánchez referred to the United States as a "venomous putain nation, genuflector to the dollar signs." He openly rejected any attempt to romanticize prison life. He later earned his doctorate and became a professor at Washington State University. A teacher had reportedly told him in his youth that "Mexicans don't become poets."
- Walter R. Baca (1947–1993) was an illustrator and muralist who depicted Chicano themes in his work. While incarcerated, Baca created paño art. His most notable work is Orale ese Vato (1992), which was created while Baca was incarcerated in New Mexico. The piece is noted for the way it "avidly consumes and reconfigures both American and Mexican pop culture with its own slang, looks, and attitude," which is a characteristic of Chicano art. It is cataloged in the National Museum of American History. His work was featured in the Museum of International Folk Art from July 21, 1996 to July 21, 1996 and is also in a permanent collection of paño art at the American Folk Art Museum.
