= Definitely, Maybe =

2008 romantic comedy film

- Theatrical release poster
- Directed by: Adam Brooks
- Written by: Adam Brooks
- Produced by: Tim Bevan; Eric Fellner
- Starring: Ryan Reynolds; Isla Fisher; Derek Luke; Abigail Breslin; Elizabeth Banks; Rachel Weisz
- Cinematography: Florian Ballhaus
- Edited by: Peter Teschner
- Music by: Clint Mansell
- Production companies: StudioCanal; Working Title Films
- Distributed by: Universal Pictures (international); Mars Distribution (France)
- Release date: February 14, 2008
- Running time: 111 minutes
- Countries: Germany; France; United Kingdom; United States
- Language: English
- Budget: $24 million
- Box office: $55.6 million

Definitely, Maybe is a 2008 romantic comedy film written and directed by Adam Brooks, and starring Ryan Reynolds, Isla Fisher, Rachel Weisz, Elizabeth Banks, Abigail Breslin, and Kevin Kline.

Set in New York City, the film is about a former political consultant who tries to help his daughter understand his impending divorce by telling her the story of his past romantic relationships and how he ended up marrying her mother.

Principal photography began on October 2, 2006. The film was released on February 14, 2008, and grossed $55 million worldwide. It received positive reviews from critics, who praised the cast performances, premise, and writing. Definitely Maybe solidified Ryan Reynolds as a leading man.

== Plot ==
Will Hayes works at an advertising agency in New York City and is in the midst of a divorce from wife Sarah. After her first sex education class, his 10-year-old daughter Maya insists on hearing the story of how her parents met. Will gives in, but changes the names and some of the facts, leaving her to guess which of the women from his past is Sarah, her mother.

In 1992, Will graduates from the University of Wisconsin–Madison, then leaves behind his college sweetheart, "Emily Jones", to work on the Bill Clinton campaign in NYC. There, he meets "April Hoffman", a fellow campaign staffer, and delivers a package from Emily to her college friend, "Summer Hartley". The package is revealed to be Summer's diary, which Will reads, learning she had a brief affair with Emily. Summer is dating her professor, Hampton Roth, but spontaneously kisses Will.

Will tells April his plan to propose to Emily, so he rehearses with her; April replies, “Definitely, maybe.” They go to her apartment where Will asks about her many copies of Jane Eyre. She explains that her father gave her a copy with a personal inscription shortly before he died, but the book was later lost. She has spent years searching secondhand bookstores for it and collects any copy with an inscription. April and Will kiss, but he abruptly leaves.

The following day, Emily arrives but when Will tries to propose, she confesses that she slept with his roommate, and urges him to move on and pursue his ambitions.

After Clinton is elected, Will opens a political consulting firm with his friend and former co-worker Russell, staying in close touch with April as she travels the world. He encounters Summer, now a journalist and single, and they begin a relationship.

April returns from abroad, planning to tell Will that she loves him, but discovers he is now planning to propose to Summer. However, before he can, Summer shows him the article she has written which will ruin his candidate's campaign. He asks her not to publish it, but she already has so Will ends their relationship. The article effectively derails the campaign, costing Will his political career and friends.

Years later, April reaches out to Will, who has fallen into depression. She throws him a birthday party, reuniting him with his old colleagues, but he quietly leaves the party early. Will then drunkenly confesses to April that he loves her, leading to an argument about the state of their lives.

Passing a bookstore, Will finds the inscribed copy of Jane Eyre April's father had given her. Going to her apartment to give her the book, he decides against it upon meeting her boyfriend Kevin, who is living there. Will then runs into Summer, who tells him she is pregnant and invites him to a party. There, he reunites with Emily, who has recently moved to the city.

In the present, Maya deduces that "Emily" is her mother, whose real name is Sarah. She hopes her parents will reunite, but Will assures her that she is the story's happy ending. Later, he signs the divorce papers.

Unpacking in his new apartment, Will discovers April's book. He brings it to her, apologizing for waiting so long, but she asks him to leave. At Maya's urging, Will realizes he is miserable without April, whose name he did not change in the story like he did to "Emily"/Sarah and "Summer"/Natasha.

Will and Maya go to April's apartment, so he can explain his reasoning to her, but she does not let them inside. Father and daughter decide to count to 30 to give her the chance to change her mind. While they are counting into the intercom at the door, Maya urges Will to tell April the story. She overhears the conversation so, just as father and daughter start to walk away, she runs after them. Will explains he kept the book as it was the only thing he had left of her. April invites them in to tell her the story, and she and Will kiss.

== Cast ==
- Ryan Reynolds as William "Will" Matthew Hayes
- Isla Fisher as April Hoffman
- Derek Luke as Russell T. McCormack
- Abigail Breslin as Maya Hayes
- Elizabeth Banks as "Emily Jones"/Sarah
- Rachel Weisz as "Summer Hartley"/Natasha
- Kevin Kline as Professor Hampton Roth
- Adam Ferrara as Gareth
- Annie Parisse as Anne
- Liane Balaban as Kelly
- Nestor Serrano as Arthur Robredo
- Marc Bonan as Kevin
- Alexie Gilmore as Olivia
- Kevin Corrigan as Simon
- Sakina Jaffrey as School Mom

== Music ==
The film was scored by English composer Clint Mansell. Lakeshore Records released the score on March 18, 2008. All Music Guide reviewer William Ruhlmann praised the album as filled with "sweet, melodic numbers that often seem to lack only a lyric to turn them into pop songs". He also stated that it functioned as "light accompaniment to an equally light entertainment".

== Release ==
In its opening weekend, the film grossed $9.8 million from 2,204 theaters in the United States and Canada, ranking #5 at the box office. It went on to gross $56 million worldwide.

The film was released on DVD June 24, 2008, with a widescreen transfer, deleted scenes, two short featurettes, and a commentary track by Reynolds and director Brooks.

== Reception ==
On Rotten Tomatoes the film has an approval rating of 71% based on reviews from 148 critics, with an average rating of 6.5/10. The site's consensus reads: "With a clever script and charismatic leads, Definitely, Maybe is a refreshing entry into the romantic comedy genre." On Metacritic the film has an average score of 59 out of 100 based on 33 reviews, indicating "mixed or average" reviews. Audiences polled by CinemaScore gave the film an average grade of "B+" on an A+ to F scale.

Dennis Harvey of Variety called it "A pleasingly non-formulaic romantic seriocomedy, Definitely, Maybe has charm and some depth, even if it’s ultimately more a third-base hit than a home run." A.O. Scott of The New York Times called it "A nimble and winning little romance". Claudia Puig of USA Today gave it a positive review and wrote: "It's generally enjoyable, amusing and more sophisticated than most films in this genre."

Stephen Farber of The Hollywood Reporter gave a more mixed review but praised the cast: "The film is far from a complete washout, and this is chiefly a tribute to its immensely attractive and appealing cast. Ryan Reynolds proves to have the stuff of a true leading man."

Caroline Siede of The A.V. Club reviewed the film in 2021 and called it "underrated". She noted it as a turning point in the career of Ryan Reynolds as he "traded snark for sincerity." Siede said the plot was "essentially How I Met Your Mother with a dash of High Fidelity" but praised the film for "breath[ing] new life into old formulas without throwing the rest of the genre under the bus."
