= D'Jalma Garnier =

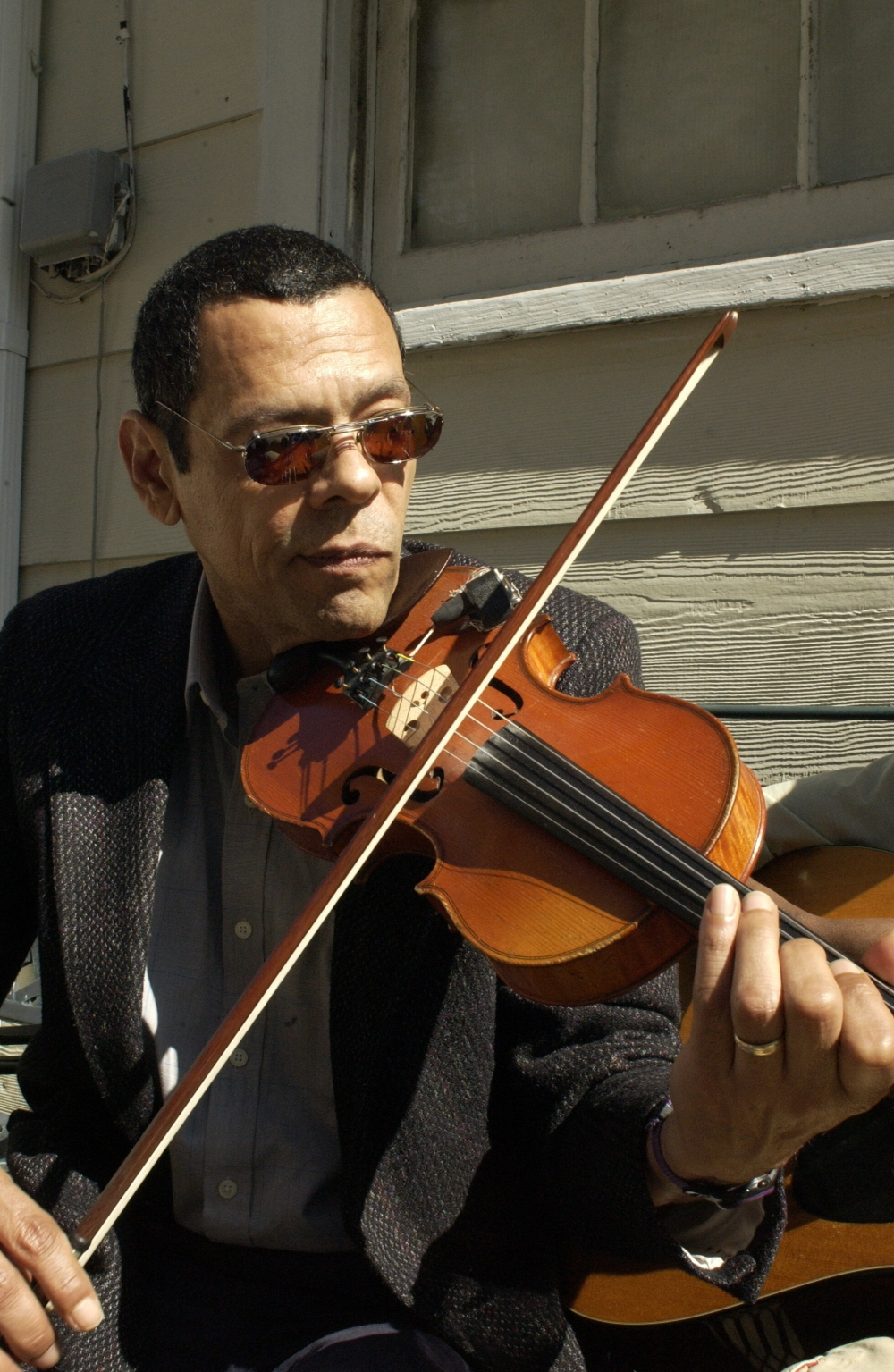
- In New Orleans, Louisiana 2007

Background information
- Genres: Creole, Cajun, zydeco
- Occupations: Musician, songwriter, disc jockey
- Instruments: Vocals, guitar, fiddle, bass
- Years active: 1964–present
- Labels: Green Linnet, Arhoolie

D'Jalma Garnier is a musician and composer best known for Creole and Cajun fiddle and "outside" musical compositions and collaborations with other artists.

== Biography ==
His musical heritage descends from the Camelia Brass Band in New Orleans led by his grandfather, D'Jalma Thomas Garnier (also spelled Ganier while with Camelia Brass Band), a legendary early jazz player noted on the Preservation Hall roster in the New Orleans French Quarter and who was a trumpet player, pianist and violinist said to have taught Louis Armstrong at the New Orleans Colored Waifs' Home. D'Jalma Garnier, the fiddler, composer, guitarist, and "pedestrian scholar" of Louisiana Creole fame, is the older brother of Tony Garnier, Bob Dylan's band leader and bass player for the Neverending Tour Band since 1989. The two brothers, along with musician Stephen "Stevo" Théard (son of Magdelene Elizabeth Garnier, and grandson of Papa Garnier) are the only descendants of Papa Garnier to become professional musicians in the legacy of this significant New Orleans musical family.

D'Jalma Garnier has been the subject and contributor to many articles and documentaries about Louisiana Creole music. He plays fiddle and guitar, and has performed and recorded with many leading Creole musicians. His study of Creole fiddle playing was advanced as the result of a two-year Texas Folklife Resources Grant to study and perform with the NEA National Heritage Award winner Canray Fontenot. D'Jalma has taught this material repeatedly at the Augusta Folklife Heritage Camp in North Carolina, for Louisiana Folk Roots in Lafayette, and in other workshops at home and abroad.

The musical accomplishments of Garnier's heritage and work with zydeco and Cajun bands in Acadiana do not detract from his work as an ethnomusicologist of Louisiana Francophone cultures or forays into avant-garde and electronic music. He is a multi-instrumentalist who performs professionally on bass and guitar, as well as fiddle, in a variety of genres. His musical work with his wife includes performances and recordings with Allen Ginsberg and Hedwig Gorski, among others. Garnier produces Passport to Modern Jazz on KRVS-FM radio to "walk you through the gate" of new and progressive artists.

== Book ==
Mel Bay released Garnier's 2009 book, a method book with a collection of 14 songs by the masters of Louisiana Creole fiddle music, and an instructional DVD with supplemental performances. The songs were chosen because they are either the first ones people tend to learn, were written by a master and have many possibilities for variations, or cover related styles. The method covers the technique step-by-step along with tricks necessary to perform the music. Garnier created sheet music for many Creole folk classics. The transcriptions are unique for this music genre because these songs have been passed down from player to player and learned by ear.

This volume is a rich sampling of core material from Louisiana roots music. The late Canray Fontenot is the best known Creole fiddler, and much of this book is infused with his legacy, including five of his compositions and a video clip. Mr. Garnier has included two of his own tunes, and the rest are by pioneer Louisiana fiddlers of the past—Amédé Ardoin, Bébé Carrière, and Dennis McGee, along with zydeco favorite Boozoo Chavis. The method part of the book explains Creole fiddle technique, including bowing, cross bowing, fingering, double stops, and scratching, helping the reader learn to play in a Louisiana style. Along with learning to play solo, information is included on working with accordion players, a second fiddle, guitarists, starting a tune in a group and other tips about working with bands, and amplification. Additional resources are available when playing the disc on a computer.

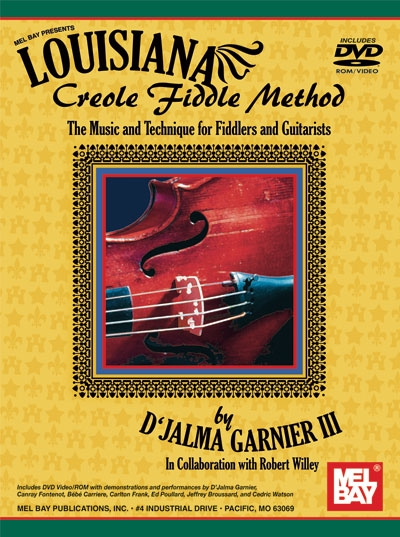
Louisiana Creole Fiddle Method transcriptions of old Creole fiddle folk songs from Cajun/Creole Louisiana
