= Raúlrsalinas =

Pinto poetry, Chicanismo, and Chicano literature

raúlrsalinas
- Born: Raúl R. Salinas; March 17, 1934; San Antonio, Texas
- Died: February 13, 2008 (aged 73); Austin, Texas, United States
- Occupations: Author; poet; activist

Raúl R. Salinas (March 17, 1934 - February 13, 2008), better known by his pen name raúlrsalinas, was an American pinto poet, memoirist, social activist, and prison journalist. Much of raúlrsalinas' writing was grounded in arguments for social justice and human rights. He was an early pioneer of Chicano pinto (prisoner) poetry and is notable for his use of vernacular, bilingual, and free verse aesthetics.

Alongside Ricardo Sánchez, Judy Lucero, Luis Talamantez, and Jimmy Santiago Baca, raúlrsalinas sought to make prisoners' rights a more central focus of the Chicano Movement. Incarcerated for over a decade (1959–1972) on marijuana related charges, raúlrsalinas wrote extensively while in prison, including essays, letters, prose, and journalism, the vast majority of which is now held at Stanford University. raúlrsalinas' work extended beyond his prison writing, focusing also on his Xicanindio (indigenous identified Chicano) heritage and his politics as a Latino internationalist. According to Oxford University, raúlrsalinas "transformed elements of the American literary canon."

== Early life ==
Raul Salinas was born in San Antonio, Texas in 1934 to Frances and Ricardo Salinas. Raised by a single mother in East Austin, at seventeen a judge gave Salinas the choice of going to jail, joining the military, or relocating. Salinas moved to Northern California where he found employment as a farmworker.

== Arrests and incarceration ==
In 1957, Salinas was arrested on marijuana related charges in Los Angeles County. He served his sentence at Soledad State Prison. Salinas earned parole in 1959 before being arrested in Austin, Texas for possession of marijuana in 1961. He served his sentence at Huntsville State Prison. There, he wrote a jazz column for the prison newspaper The Echo from 1964 until his 1965 release. Additionally, Salinas become well known for his writings outside of prison by his contributions and editing of the prison publication New Era and Aztlán de Leavenworth. Salinas then moved back to Austin with his wife and three children.

After conviction for felony racketeering charges for drug trafficking in 1967, Salinas served time at Leavenworth Federal Prison in Kansas. There, Salinas met Puerto Rican Independentistas Rafael Cancel Miranda and Oscar Collazo, and began the works of Ernesto “Che” Guevara, Frantz Fanon, and related radical third world literature. African American music and political struggle also contributed to Salinas’ development. Inspired by freedom fighters such as George Jackson (activist) and Eldridge Cleaver Salinas developed a growing political consciousness that would continue to drive him. At Leavenworth, Salinas participated in a “Cultural History of the Southwest” course which met for two years.

Prison personnel targeted Salinas for his political nature and transferred him to Marion Federal Penitentiary. He was part of a group of politicized prisoners who faced retaliation after widespread prison rebellions in response to the killing of George Jackson in 1971. His final release from incarceration was from Marion in 1972.

== Activism and Advocacy ==
After his release in 1972, Salinas moved to Seattle to study at the University of Washington and dedicate his life to bringing awareness to prisoner's rights and Chicano activism. This activism lead Salinas to become involved in the American Indian Movement and bring attention to the life and imprisonment of Leonard Peltier though his involvement in the Free Leonard Peltier Committee. Although not Native American himself, he was still heavily involved as a member of the International Indian Treaty Council and as an organizer of the 1976 Trail of Tears March to Washington. Although known for his writings and poetry, during the height of his activism he did not publish much as his advocacy work took priority. Through his works and leadership he was able to bring more support and attention to the American Indian Movement.

== Death and legacy ==
Raúl Salinas died on February 13, 2008, in Austin, Texas as a result of a long battle with liver cancer. His work from 1957 to 2008 are currently held within Stanford University's Special Collections. Within these collections are his published and unpublished writings, artwork, and journal writings. Within the collection are materials that Salinas had collected during his involvement in the American Indian Movement, the Leonard Peltier Defense Committee, and the International Indian Treaty Council.

== Published works ==
- Un Trip through the Mind Jail y Otras Excursions (Arte Publico Press, 1980). ISBN 978-1558852754
- East of the Freeway: Reflections De Mi Pueblo (Red Salmon Press, 1995). ISBN 978-0962350603
- Many Mundos Of Raulrsalinas: Un Poetic Jazz Viaje (Calaca Press, 2000). ISBN 978-0966077353
- Red Arc: A Call For Liberación Con Salsa Y Cool (Wings Press, 2005). ISBN 978-0916727192
- raú́lrsalinas and the Jail Machine: My Weapon is My Pen (University of Texas Press, 2006). ISBN 978-0292713284
- Indio Trails: A Xicano Odyssey Through Indian Country (Wings Press, 2006). ISBN 978-0916727376
- Memoir of Un Ser Humano: The Life and Times de Raúlrsalinas, edited by Louis G. Mendoza. (Red Salmon Press, 2018). ISBN 978-1642042061

== Recognition ==
- Guadalupe Cultural Arts Center Distinguished Writer Award
- Luis Reyes A. Rivera Lifetime Achievement Award
- Lifetime Achievement Award, National Association for Latino Arts and Cultures
- Alfredo Cisneros Del Moral Foundation Award
- In a senate resolution, Texas acknowledged Salinas’ work with youth and contributions to community arts.

== See also ==
- List of Chicano poets
- Pinto (subculture)
