= Albert Huffstickler =

American writer

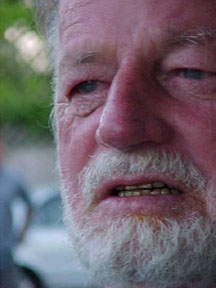
- Photo of Albert Huffstickler, taken in 1999
- Born: Albert Clyde Huffstickler; December 17, 1927; Laredo, Texas
- Died: February 25, 2002 (aged 74); Austin, Texas
- Resting place: Santa Fe, New Mexico
- Citizenship: United States
- Education: University of North Carolina at Chapel Hill
- Alma mater: Southwest Texas State University
- Occupations: Writer, poet
- Writing career
- Language: English
- Genre: Poetry

Albert Huffstickler (December 17, 1927 – February 25, 2002) was an American poet. He was born in Texas and lived in Austin during his later years, contributing to the poetry scene there and further afield. Huffstickler published hundreds of poems in his lifetime in both chapbooks and academic and underground journals. A 1990 Sow's Ear Poetry Review article reporting on an interview by Felicia Mitchell described Huffstickler's natural poetic voice as "an attempt to meld the human voice with the poetic spirit to present a highly charged, story-filled verse."

== Background ==
Albert Huffstickler was born in Laredo, Texas, surviving a twin who died at birth. As the son of a teacher and soldier, he and his two siblings (a brother and a sister) moved often growing up. After graduating from high school, he worked in Charlotte, North Carolina prior to attending, but not graduating from, the University of North Carolina where he discovered poetry. Marriage and children followed as well as various jobs in Florida and Arizona, where he briefly studied Scientology. Drafted in 1954, he spent two years in the army. After completing armed service he returned to Texas where he attended Southwest Texas State University, majoring in English and developing an interest in Jungian psychology. During the 1960s, Huffstickler continued writing poetry as well as erotica, publishing the erotic pulp fiction under a pseudonym.

Huffstickler moved to Austin, Texas, in 1964, and the town became his home base as he moved around and travelled. In 1973 he began working at the Perry–Castañeda Library at the University of Texas at Austin, where he remained until retirement at the age of 62. Brett Holloway-Reeves of The Austin Chronicle wrote, "This poet of the road-trip would stay at the university for over 20 years, but his heart still wandered." "I had trouble with work," Huffstickler told Holloway-Reeves. "All my life. I didn't like it. I had trouble with time... and my battle with time, that meant I didn't make much of a living. When I got on with the Library, I made peace with the job situation, but I never really resolved it. I used to be embarrassed about it. But kids now, they don't care. They just slough along, spare-changing for what they can get. They're not ashamed."

Huffstickler believed in giving back to his community and helping others less fortunate. While in Austin, Huffstickler began the Hyde Park Poets Series, where he was known as the "Bard of Hyde Park" and taught poetry seminars, inspiring other well-known Austin poets including W. Joe Hoppe. He also did volunteer work in hospitals, including the state hospital, and other care facilities. In 1989 the Texas state legislature honored his contribution to poetry. Working with Huffstickler, Richard Spiegel and Barbara Fisher included some of his work in their books Dealing with Differences and Service Learning: The Alternative Approach.

Late in life, Huffstickler began focusing more and more on visual art, working with various media including charcoal and pastels, sometimes selling his artwork or showing it in local venues. A documentary film about Huffstickler, Holy Secrets by Matthew Listiak, highlights Huffstickler's personality and poetry and includes images of his art. A longtime resident of Hyde Park neighborhood in Austin, Texas, Huffstickler died on 25 February 2002, of an aneurysm.

== Poetry ==
Huffstickler believed in the small presses and small journals, contributing hundreds of poems to journals around the world from the underground to the academic. Longtime relationships with Lilliput Review and Waterways: Poetry in the Mainstream led to numerous publications in those journals. Barbara Fisher and Richard Spiegel, publishers and co-editors of Waterways have noted that his work "first appeared in the February 1985 issue of Waterways. Eventually, a poem by Huffstickler would close each magazine, with hundreds of poems appearing in this magazine.

Many of Huffstickler's books were published by presses based in Austin, Texas. Huffstickler's career began to grow when he won the first of two Austin Book Awards in 1989 for Walking Wounded, published by Backyard Press. The second Austin Book Award was for Working on My Death Chant, published in 1991.The Wander Years was published in 1998 by SRLR Press. Fisher and Spiegel also published a chapbook, Soul Gallery. Why I Write In Coffee Houses and Diners, a collection of selected poems, was published in 2000 by iUniverse.

In addition to publishing in journals and by small presses, Huffstickler published many of his own poems under his Press of Circumstance imprint, often designing the cover and using his own art.

Poems have been included in a number of anthologies, including Grow Old Along with Me: The Best is Yet to Be (edited by Sandra Martz for Papier Mache Press, 1996) and I Feel a Little Jumpy Around You: A Book of Her Poems & His Poems Collected in Pairs (edited by Naomi Shihab Nye & Paul B. Janeczko for Simon & Schuster, 1998).

== Commentary ==
In 1988, Richard Lance Williams wrote in The Austin Chronicle about Huffstickler's poetry, commenting that "travelling [had] instilled in him a great tolerance for the diversity of human behavior and a deep understanding of how a rootless life can drive one to insanity." As Williams noted, "his poetry reflect this diversity." "Long or short, elegies or curses, comic or obscene, sad or jubilant, but always in his vocabulary of ideas," Williams continued, "his poems speak to the longing of a human for an understanding of their place in this strange, dangerous universe." After another interview with Huffstickler in 1989, Williams commented on Huffstickler's interest in "the artist's blessing, the curse; why artists have to create because the terror is so great, the universe without them so incomprehensible, too comprehensible...." As he requested in a poem, Huffstickler's ashes were scattered in an arroyo outside of Santa Fe, New Mexico, and by chance or fate, the arroyo turned out to be on Hyde Park Road. As Williams's eulogy concluded, Huff remains "a soul who even now is on a bus somewhere between here and eternity."

== Bibliography ==
=== Books ===
- Why I Write in Coffee Houses and Diners. San Jose & New York: IUniverse, 2000.
- The Wander Years. Austin: SRLR Press, 1998.
- Working on My Death Chant. Austin, TX: Backyard Press, 1991.
- Walking Wounded. Austin, TX: Backyard Press, 1989.

=== Chapbooks ===
- The Certitude of Laundromats. Austin, TX: Jamming Staplers Press, 1995.
- The Cosmology of Madness. St. Paul, MN: Pariah Press/Heeltap Specials, 2000.
- Emergency Room. Austin, TX: SRLR Press, 1995. 26 pp.
- Her. Austin, TX: Aileron Press, 1982.
- Hindsight, Or How I Survived the Depression. Austin, TX: Liquid Paper Press, 1997.
- Impressions from Childhood. Austin, TX: Aileron Press, 1982.
- Learning to Lie. Austin, TX: Liquid Paper Press, 2001. 40 pp.
- Night Diner. A Report to Edward Hopper. Austin, TX: Aileron Press/L'Ecole Whitman, 1985.
- Pieces of Brandon. A Fragmentation. Austin, TX: Slough Press, 1989.
- Remembering Huff. Staten Island, NY: Ten Penny Players, Inc., 2002.
- The Remembered Light. Edgewood, TX: Slough Press, 1980.
- The Smell of Distance. Austin, TX: Ambrose and Lewis, 1991.
- Soul Gallery. NY: Bard Press, 1988.
- Wanda. Austin, TX: Plain View Press, 1988.
- A Web of Light. Fallen Chap Series #2. Austin, TX: McOne Press, 1990.
- Who Speaks My Secret Name. Greensboro, NC: March Street Press, 2001.

=== Press of Circumstance Chapbooks ===
- Alienation or The Billy the Kid Syndrome. 1998. 22 pp.
- Armageddon. 1998. 20 pp.
- Cafe du Jour. 11 pp. 1985. "Merry Christmas from Huff"
- City of the Rain. 36 pp. 1993. Typeset and design by Michael Ambrose
- Crossing Over. 2000. 24 pp. Typeset, design, and cover by F. Mitchell
- The Condition Human. Typeset and design by Keith Haas
- Dishwashers and Other Forgotten Angels. 1997. 13 pp. (First appeared in Silent Treatment E-Zine)
- The Embassy Suites Poems. 1993. 8 pp. Typeset and design by Maria Silvagnia-Macatangay
- Fanfare for Lost Angels. 66 pp. 1998. Typeset and design by Keith Haas
- Four Visions. 1998. 12 pp. Typeset and design by Michael Ambrose
- Gleanings. 20 pp. 1989. Typeset, design, and cover by Felicia Mitchell
- The Hennessey Papers. Fiction by Huffstickler and Mark Smith. 2nd. ed. 1996
- Hindsight, [TBA]
- Hodgepodge. February 1991. 8 pp.
- Impressions from Childhood. 2000. 12 pp.
- It's Lonely at the Bottom Too. 1997. 12 pp. Typeset and design by Felicia Mitchell
- The Lost Poem. 1998. 28 pp.
- On the Doorstep of Your Heart. 1998. 38 pp.
- McSwyne and the Goddess. 1997. 28 pp.
- My Last Madonna and Other Poems. 1999. 22 pp.
- My Mother at 84. 2000. 12 pp.
- A Layer of Stone. June 1997. 10 pp. "Printed on the Xerox DocuTech 135"
- The Man in the Chair. Variations on a Dream. 1997. 9 pp. Typeset and design by Felicia Mitchell
- The Old Man. 1988. 4 pp.
- The Perils of Haggerty. A Dark Fugue. 1998. 48 pp. Typeset and design by Keith Haas
- Pieces of Brandon. A Fragmentation. 2nd ed. 1991. 20 pp. Typeset and design by P. S. Monear
- Quinlen. 1995. 72 pp. Typeset and design by Mark Brimm
- A Requiem for Lunchbutt. 1997. 12 pp. Typeset and design by Michael Ambrose
- The Ruta Maya Poems. 1997. 32 pp. Typeset and design by Michael Ambrose
- Sequences. 1999. 22 pp. Typeset, design, and cover by Felicia Mitchell
- She Said. 1991. 10 pp. Design, typesetting by Mark Christal.
- St. Francis Was a Flower. [date] Child Typeset and design by Keith Haas
- Taking the Fifth. September 1998. 12 pp. Cover illustration by F. Mitchell
- War Wounds. 1992. 4 pp. Typeset and design by Rich Gowen
- The Way Things Come and Go. 1992. 10 pp. Illustrations by the Author
- A Winter Song for Michele. 1988. 8 pp. Typeset and design by Liberty Graphics, printing by Joe Ericson
- Work. 1993. Illustrated. 8 pp. Typeset and design by Rich Gowen/Mojo Graphics

=== Selected anthologies ===
- Grow Old Along with Me: The Best is Yet to Be. Ed. Sandra Martz. CA: Papier Mache Press, 1996
- I Feel a Little Jumpy Around You: A Book of Her Poems & His Poems Collected in Pairs. Ed. Naomi Shihab Nye & Paul B. Janeczko. NY: Simon & Schuster, 1998.

=== Multimedia ===
- Matthew Listiak's "Holy Secrets: The Art and Poetry of Albert Huffstickler" on YouTube
- Albert Huffstickler Facebook Group
