= Darius Simpson =

New Afrikan poet

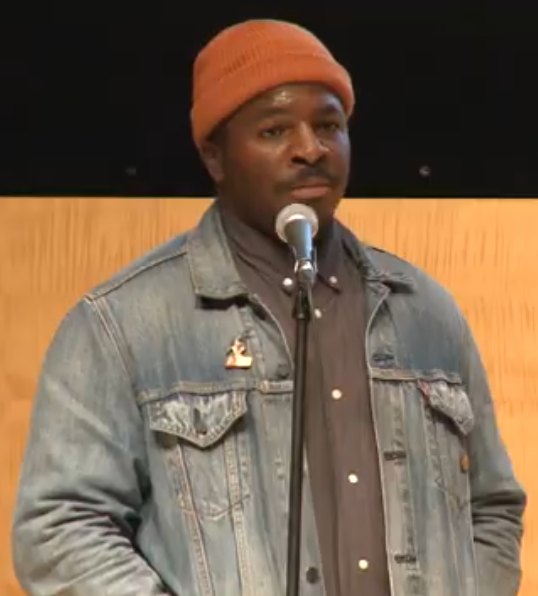
- At a reading at the San Francisco Public Library in 2024
- Born: Akron, Ohio
- Education: Mills College
- Occupation: Writer
- Writing career
- Years active: 2014–present
- Literary movement: New Afrikan
- Website: www.dariussimpson.com

Darius Simpson is a Black American poet based in Oakland, California.

== Early life ==
Simpson was born and raised in Akron, Ohio. When Simpson was in the 4th grade, his teacher recognized his talent for poetry and his mother encouraged him to keep writing poems. He is a graduate of Alchemy Inc., a nonprofit that mentors young men of color.

== Career ==
While working on his undergraduate degree in political science from Eastern Michigan University, Simpson was radicalized by the murder of Mike Brown, the Ferguson uprising, and the state's suppression of it. Simpson traveled to Ferguson on the one year anniversary of Brown's death to be with the Ferguson community. He stated about Brown's murder and the community's reaction to it, "Something snapped in me, seeing the memorial, seeing how Ferguson reacted inspired me to take it back to Michigan." Simpson also supported community members impacted by the Flint water crisis.

Simpson was featured in the documentary Finding the Gold Within, which followed the college experiences of him and five other Black men from Akron, Ohio.

In 2015, Simpson competed and coached the EMU team at the College Unions Poetry Slam Invitational hosted by Virginia Commonwealth University. Simpson and the EMU team placed third overall out of 68 other universities. The EMU team earned performances on the final stage at the competition, where Simpson performed the duet poem "Lost Voices" with teammate Scout Bosley. The poem, about the importance of marginalized people speaking for themselves, was published on Button Poetry and went viral, garnering over 4 million views by 2019.

In 2020, Simpson was awarded a Ruth Lilly and Dorothy Sargent Rosenberg Poetry Fellowship from the Poetry Foundation, receiving a $25,800 prize.

In 2022, Simpson published his book Never Catch Me, about "being a Black boy coming up in the Midwest". In 2023, the book won a Midwest Book Award.

In 2024, Essence featured him in an article about visionary artistic activists, writing, "Simpson's work exemplifies the artist's responsibility to confront and preserve."

== Awards ==
- College Unions Poetry Slam Invitational Finalist, 2015
- Ruth Lilly and Dorothy Sargent Rosenberg Poetry Fellowship, 2020
- 2nd Prize, Common Ground Annual Poetry Competition, 2020
- Runner-up for the Auburn Witness Poetry Prize, 2021
- NORward Prize for Poetry, 2021
- 2nd Place, Previously Published Prize, 2021
- Creative Writing Fellow of the National Endowment for the Arts, 2023
- Midwest Book Award, 2023

== Works ==
=== Poetry collections ===
- Never Catch Me, Button Poetry, 2022 ISBN 978-1-63834-048-5

=== Poems ===
- "Etymology of Fuck 12", The Adroit Journal, October 2020
- "Early 2000s Fashion Was a Confusing Time for All of Us", The American Poetry Review, November 2020
- "Perhaps We Are Our Ancestors' Wildest Dreams", Poetry Foundation, December 2020
- "We Don't Die", New Ohio Review, July 2021
- "I Left the Church in Search of God", Southern Humanities Review, October 2021
- "The Leaves Change Color During Campaign Season", Metro Times, May 2024
