= Gez Walsh =

English poet

Gez Walsh is a children's poet and a former social worker. He has written various books of children's comedy poetry including; "The Spot on my Bum," "The Return of the Spot," "Someone's Nicked My Knickers," Parents, Zits and Hairy Bits, Norah's Nasty Knickers, Fido's Foul Surprise, Don't Wee in the Bath, Terry and Mum, the Dog's Drunk Again! In addition, he is also the author of a trilogy of sword-and-sorcery fantasy novels: "The Man in the Skirt", "Banshee Moon" and "The Keeper".

In 1997 he began touring promoting his wacky and zany poetry. This has included many performances at schools, libraries and festivals in the UK and beyond, in Germany, Luxembourg and other venues. In addition, his best-selling book, The Spot on My Bum, was translated into Portuguese in 2012 under the title A Borbulha No Rabo, by Portuguese poet Helder Moulder Pereira.

In April 2018 he co-founded the charity Platform 1 in Huddersfield.

== Poems ==
Gez Walsh burst into the poetry scene in 1997 armed with his first collection of children's verse, The Spot on My Bum: Horrible Poems for Horrible Children, which was rapidly to become a cult classic. Written in response to his dyslexic son's need for stimulating, approachable reading material, Gez decided to use humour as his tool to encourage interest. Quickly realising he'd hit on a successful method of providing reluctant readers with enthusiasm, Gez's world of laughter sprang into life. Soon it was not only his son enjoying hilarious performances of these poems, but a much wider audience of enthusiasts at schools, festivals, book signings and charity events.

Adding to his range of material for an ever-growing army of fans, Gez penned The Return of The Spot: More Horrible Poems for More Horrible Children (1997). Encouraged by this success Gez decided to try and further his appeal by branching out into fiction. In 1998 volume one of the Celtic Chronicles trilogy, The Man in The Skirt, was published and promptly reviewed on the popular children's television programme Fully Booked. A year later in 1999 his followers were presented with his next poetry offering, Someone's Nicked My Knickers: Poems to Make Your Toes Curl, then, in 2000, Parents, Zits and Hairy Bits: The World According to Wilf, a big hit with teenagers.

Towards the end of 2001, Fido's Foul Surprise And Other 'Ruff' Rhymes hit the bookshops, closely followed by the second volume of the comedy-horror Celtic Chronicles, Banshee Moon.

2002 saw Gez's sixth potty poetry collection, Norah's Nasty Knickers: Crazy Poems for Cool Kids come into being, receiving a warm reception from fans and generating media interest, while 2003 provided the much-awaited concluding volume to the Celtic Chronicles trilogy in the shape of The Keeper.

Alongside Gez's Potty Poets titles, the first book in the author's new educational series, Fax 4 U, was released, entitled Drugs - Booze, Glue, Cigs and Coffee, too!, part of a set of books aimed at broaching issues facing 21st century young people. The end of the year also heralded the entry of Don't Wee in the Bath, Terry!: Potty Poems with a Capital "P", the author's eleventh book.

2004 proved a busy time for Gez. Writing and performing full-time took his unique brand of humour to schools, libraries and festivals around the country with his reputation as a motivator of reluctant readers growing alongside his popularity. Bringing Gez's published work to the dozen mark was the author's most recent poetry collection, Mum, the Dog's Drunk Again! Horribly Potty Poems for Horribly Horrid Kids. This brought Gez to the attention of the nation once more as BBC's Look North televised his comic poetry performance during a World Book Day celebration in a Yorkshire school, while Radio Five Live also featured Gez's antics.

Since the publication of "Mum, The Dog's Drunk Again", Gez Walsh has concentrated his writing in other directions. While he continued keeping faith with the Potty Poets brand by working on "Great Aunt Fanny's Moustache" which is still forthcoming, Walsh has really been concentrating on his new series of fiction for young adults, Twisted Minds. Volume 1 of this series, The Meeting Room, was originally published initially as a digital book for download only; however, it is due for release in book form in late 2014. In the meantime, two other volumes, Changes and Diva Dave and Fat Sue, have appeared both in book form and as e-books.

Walsh has also developed a stand-up act for adult audiences. He also regularly presents the Wednesday afternoon show on Phoenix FM Radio in Calderdale, West Yorkshire. In the summer of 2014 he was appointed as the official "poet laureate" of Calderdale. Also, at the same time, he was the poet in residence at the Orange Box, a community arts centre in Halifax, West Yorkshire.
