= Marty Watt =

American performer and actor (born 1952)

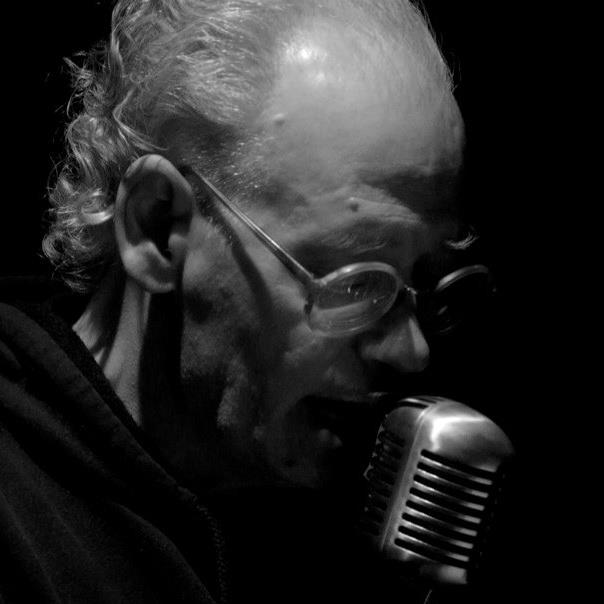
- Marty Watt in Valencia, Spain, 2012

Background information
- Born: Martin Patrick Watt; 1952 (age 73–74); Philadelphia, Pennsylvania, U.S.
- Genres: Poetry, Performance, No Wave, Cinema
- Occupations: Performance poet, Lyricist, Vocalist, Actor
- Years active: 1970–1987
- Website: www.dotfur.com

Martin Watt (born 1952) is an American performer and actor, who helped the development of performance poetry in the early 1970s. In the late 1970s and 1980s, he moved increasingly into music.

== Biography ==
Watt was born in the Fairmount neighborhood of Philadelphia into a working-class family. His father, Martin, was a civil servant, and his mother, Claire, was a housewife and semi-professional lounge singer. He attended Bishop Newman High School and Frankford High School, but left before graduating to pursue a career in the arts. Interested in poetry from an early age, Watt had begun composing his own poems, influenced by such authors as "...Keats, Shakespeare, and the old anonymous ballads".

Watt published intermittently throughout the early and mid-1970s in independent Philadelphia magazines and literary journals such as CONTACT, where his work appeared alongside that of Ted Berrigan, Tom Pickard and Otis Brown. But it was for his live performances that Watt gained wider notoriety. Initially in his native Philadelphia, but later in Washington and New York, Watt built a steady following and drew strong reviews for shows which challenged audience expectations as to what a “poetry reading” was. Alan Kriegsman of The Washington Post said Watt “created an unclassifiable format of his own. Part recital, part sideshow, part seance. To call it a poetry reading would be like calling King Kong a nature film.” His performances displayed an interest in stagecraft seldom seen in the conventional poetry reading- sound effects, lighting effects, specially built sets, props, costume design, as well as the occasional use of backup “singers”-all used in accompaniment to Watt's recital from memory.

In Philadelphia, Watt had successful runs at Etage, the Mask and Wig Club, the Wilma Theater, and the Painted Bride, among others. In Washington D.C. he appeared at the Washington Project for the Arts in late January 1976, the three night series of performances being praised in both the Washington Post and the (now defunct) Washington Star.

As he increasingly integrated music into his performances, Watt ultimately formed a band with a number of Philadelphia musicians. Part of New York's “no wave” school, and influenced by Jamaican “dub-style” reggae vocalists, the band was fronted by Watt and included an evolving series of musicians, (among them Paul Dugan, Hank Ransome, and Chris Larkin). They performed under various names in New York and Philadelphia area venues, and recorded one never released album. The band's material was based on poems, or fragments of same, written by Watt and set to music composed by various other components of the band.

In 1982, Watt collaborated with painter and graphic artist Matt Marello on Marty Watt Is Not Matt Marello and Vice Verse (Wax Bean/Go Home Productions, 1982), a book of Watt poems illustrated by Marello.

Marty Watt performing World Made of Flies

Marty Watt band performing song Ungawa
