= KRVS =

Public radio station in Lafayette, Louisiana

Lafayette, Louisiana; United States
- Broadcast area: Lafayette-Acadiana combined statistical area, Lake Charles metropolitan area
- Frequency: 88.7 MHz (HD Radio)
- Branding: Radio Acadie

Programming
- Languages: English; Louisiana French
- Format: Public radio
- Subchannels: HD2: KampusFM (College Radio); HD3: News & Talk (all news/talk)
- Affiliations: American Public Media; NPR; Public Radio International

Ownership
- Owner: University of Louisiana at Lafayette

History
- First air date: August 8, 1963; 62 years ago
- Call sign meaning: Radio Voice of Southwestern, in reference to former name of owner, University of Southwestern Louisiana

Technical information
- Licensing authority: FCC
- Facility ID: 66595
- Class: C0
- ERP: 100,000 watts
- HAAT: 379.0 meters (1,243.4 ft)
- Transmitter coordinates: 30°19′20.00″N 92°22′40.00″W

Links
- Public license information: Public file; LMS
- Webcast: Listen live (via TuneIn); Listen live (HD2)
- Website: www.krvs.org kampusfm.krvs.org (HD2)

KRVS (88.7 FM) is an American radio station broadcasting a public radio format. Licensed to Lafayette, Louisiana, United States, it is currently owned by the University of Louisiana at Lafayette and features programming from American Public Media, NPR and Public Radio International.

Programming covers various types of music of Louisiana such as Cajun music, zydeco, blues, jazz, swamp pop, swamp rock and other Louisiana singer/songwriter music. KRVS also broadcasts the annual Festival International de Louisiane. The station also carries news and music programming in Louisiana French.

== History ==
The station began broadcasting in May 1963 and was officially licensed on August 8, 1963, to operate a power of 10 watts and a coverage area of about six city blocks. The station initially operated on FM at 88.3 MHz with an AM carrier current simulcast on 600 kHz. In 1979, the station increased its FM transmission power to 3 kilowatts and shifted to 88.1 MHz. In November 1982, the station again increased its transmission power to 100 kW and switched to its current frequency of 88.7 MHz.

KRVS's call letters stand for Radio Voice of Southwestern (The university's name at the time the station signed on was the University of Southwestern Louisiana). Originally a college radio station, it joined NPR in the mid-1970s.

Today the station serves roles as regional public radio and an international online resource. KRVS broadcasts at 100,000 watts, providing service to 651,000 residents in 12 parishes across southern Louisiana, an area referred to as Acadiana. KRVS programs are also available on the Internet.

In fall 2023, KRVS launched an HD Radio subcarrier for the student-run station, KampusFM. The station also operates an all-talk channel, "News & Talk," featuring public radio programming on a third HD subcarrier.

Earlier version of KRVS logo used from 2005 to 2012.

KRVS operated a translator at 90.5 FM K213AZ in Lake Charles that was licensed on February 6, 1989. It was shut down on May 22, 2001 after American Family Radio opened a full-power station, KYLC, at nearby 90.3 FM. FCC rules allow a full-power station to force any adjacent translators to shut down. In 2003, KRVS moved its transmitter 30 miles to the west to extend its signal to Lake Charles. Its current signal can be heard in Lafayette, Lake Charles, Baton Rouge, Alexandria, and 100 miles into the Gulf.
