= Byron Vincent =

British writer

- Born: 26 February 1975 (age 51); Bolton
- Occupations: Writer; performer; broadcaster
- Website: byronvincent.com

Byron Vincent (born 26 February 1975) is a British writer, performer, broadcaster, DJ and social activist known predominantly for theatre, television and his work on BBC Radio 4. Vincent has a diagnosis of autism and is a campaigner for issues around mental health and poverty.

== Life and career ==
Vincent was raised on council estates in the north-west of England and has described his early life as tumultuous. His teens were particularly unsettled, during which he left school prematurely, aged 15. Over the course of the next few years he experienced homelessness, drug addiction and violence the latter reportedly being partially responsible for his diagnosis of PTSD.

After leaving the notorious and now demolished Woodside estate in Pitsmoor, Sheffield, Vincent got clean and began writing and performing as a hobby in Lancaster's Spotlight club around the mid-1990s.

Vincent started his early career as a spoken-word performer and quickly became a regular on the UK festival circuit performing at Glastonbury, Latitude, Leeds, Reading, Secret Garden Party, Shambala, Port Eliot, Camden Calling and others.

In 2009 Vincent had been chosen by Patrick Neate as one of the BBC poetry season's new talent choices. He was compère and programmer for the Bristol Old Vic's monthly spoken word night blah blah blah between 2010 and 2013. In 2014 Vincent was part of the Kill Your Darlings collective, a monthly literary cabaret at Bristol's Cube Cinema, which he ran with Molly Naylor, Nathan Filer, Nikesh Shukla, Chelsey Flood and Tom Clutterbuck.

In 2013 Vincent was one of the writers on The Royal Shakespeare Company's Midsummer Night's dreaming and has been involved in a multitude of theatre projects as a writer, performer and director. Vincent has appeared on Channel 4's Random Acts, BBC Radio 4's Wondermentalist and Bespoken Word and BBC Radio 3's The Verb.

Vincent's debut solo show Talk About Something You Like received much critical acclaim for its poignant and personal exploration of the mental health system. He has written for The Guardian and Radio 4's Four Thought. He is a popular keynote speaker and regularly gives talks on social issues to charities, police forces, government bodies and the private sector. Vincent is an ambassador for mental health charity Rethink an organisation that tackles stigma around issues of mental health.

== TV shows ==
- Skint — No Grasses, No Nonces (Writer) BBC
- Random Acts — Newsrotic (Writer/presenter) C4

== Radio shows and podcasts ==
- The Trouble With Social Mobility (Writer / Presenter; BBC Radio 4)
- Hell Is Other People: A Self-Help Guide to Social Anxiety (Writer / Presenter; BBC Radio 4)
- Four Thought - Nothing To Lose (Writer / Presenter; BBC Radio 4)
- Talk About Something You Like (TASYL) Podcast (Presenter / Producer)
- How to Turn Your Life Around (Co-presenter; BBC Radio 4)
- The Glasgow Boys (Writer-Presenter; BBC Radio 4)
- Bangers & Mash Podcast (Writer/Presenter/DJ/Producer)
- Justice Disrupted Podcast (Writer/Presenter)

== Live shows ==
- Talk About Something You Like 2015
- Live Before You Die 2016
- Instagramming the Apocalypse 2020
