= David Jewell (poet) =

American performance poet (born 1955)

- Born: David Jewell; 25 October 1955 (age 71); Danville, Illinois, U.S.
- Occupations: Poet; performance poet; author; photographer; actor
- Website: davidjewellpoet.com

David Jewell (born 1955) is an American performance poet and photographer.

== Biography ==
Jewell was born in Danville, Illinois. He was a poet from 1981 to 2019 in Austin. In 2019, he moved to Smithville, Texas.

== Poetry ==
=== Collections ===
- Lizards Again (1986), Manic D Press
- Last Word/First Word: A Poetic Conversation (2015), CreateSpace, a collaboration with Austin poet Ric Williams
- 52 Card Pickup: Last Word/First Word 2 (2017), Raw Paw, a second collaboration with Ric Williams

=== Poems ===
- Delusion Angel, written for the movie Before Sunrise (1995)

== Acting roles ==
- Waking Life (2001) - Man Talking to Caveh Zahedi
