= Richard Cambridge (poet) =

American poet

Richard Cambridge of Massachusetts is a Slam Poet and author of "Pulsa" with illuminations by Chicago artist Michelle Warriner Bolt. Winner of the Allen Ginsberg Poetry Prize, he co-founded "Singing with the Enemy", a troupe of poets, musicians and performance artists whose show, !EMBARGO! evokes the effects of the United States' 40-year economic blockade on the people of Cuba. By special invitation, the troupe performed in Havana, Cuba in July 1998. Cambridge was also the recipient of the Cambridge Peace and Justice Award in 2003.
