= Roxy Gordon =

American musician, writer and activist

- Born: March 7, 1945; Ballinger, Texas
- Died: February 7, 2000 (aged 54)
- Occupations: Poet, Novelist, Musician, Activist

Roxy Lee Gordon (March 7, 1945 – February 7, 2000) was an American poet, novelist, musician, multimedia artist, and activist. Described as a "progressive country witness and outlaw poet," Gordon often used spoken vocals accompanied by music that mixed Native American rhythms with country and Western themes and musicians working in Texas.

== Background and education ==
Gordon was raised in Talpa, Texas, and lived there later in his life. He identified as being of white, Choctaw, and Assiniboine ancestry. A report from Texas Monthly alleged that he was a "pretendian", concluding that he had no Native American heritage. The Choctaw Nation of Oklahoma has stated that Gordon was not enrolled with the tribe. Gordon's son John Calvin has stated that he has found no evidence that his father had Choctaw heritage.

== Publishing ==
In the late 1960s, his wife Judy and he lived in Lodge Pole, Montana, where he published the Fort Belknap Notes, a newsletter of the Fort Belknap reservation. In the 1970s, they moved to Albuquerque, New Mexico, and ran a country-music magazine, Picking up the Tempo. Gordon was also involved in the American Indian Movement and helped find a local chapter in Dallas. His writing was featured in Rolling Stone and the Village Voice and he ran a small publishing company called Wowapi.

== Writing ==
In addition to music and spoken word, Gordon published six books and more than 200 poems, articles, and short fiction; he also coauthored two plays with Choctaw poet and author LeAnne Howe. From July 1992 to February 2000, Gordon published over 100 articles for the Coleman Chronicle & Democrat-Voice. Gordon had a following in England as well as the U.S., and his circle included singer-songwriter Townes Van Zandt and others who respected poetic narratives.

== Works ==
His works include:

- Some Things I Did (1979), ISBN 978-0884260127
- Breeds (1984) Austin, Tex.: Place of Herons, ISBN 0916908283
- Unfinished Business (1985)
- At Play in the Lord's Fields (1986)
- West-Texas Mid Century (1988)
- Crazy Horse Never Died (1989)
- Kerrville Live (1993)
- Revolution in the Air (1995)
- Smaller Circles (1997)
- Townes Asked Did Hank Williams Ever Write Anything as Good as Nothing (2001)
