= Ricardo Sánchez (poet) =

American Chicano writer (1941–1995)

- Born: March 29, 1941; El Paso, Texas, U.S.
- Died: September 3, 1995 (aged 54); El Paso, Texas
- Occupations: Author; poet; activist
- Spouse: Maria-Teresa Silva (m. 1965)
- Children: Rikard Sergei • Libertad-Yvonne • Pedro-Cuatemoc • Jacinto-Temilotzin

Ricardo Sánchez (29 March 1941 – 3 September 1995) was a writer, poet, professor, and activist. Sometimes called the "grandfather of Chicano poetry," Sánchez gained national acclaim for his 1971 poetry collection Canto y Grito Mi Liberacion. Incarcerated in his twenties for stealing money to feed his struggling family, Sánchez read extensively and even learned Hebrew while at Soledad Prison in California. Upon his release in 1969, his poems were included in a poetry anthology. In 1971, his first solo collection of poetry was published, establishing Sánchez as one of the nation's most important Chicano poets.

== Early life ==
From a very early age, Sánchez knew he wanted to be a writer. Born during World War II on March 29, 1941, in El Barrio del Diablo, El Paso, Texas, Sánchez was the youngest of 13 children. As a teenager, he was a gifted student and notable young poet. In 1958, he had turning point after a high school teacher told him, "Chicano boys don't grow up to be poets. Janitors maybe, but not writers." The next year, Sánchez dropped out of high school to join the Army. He earned a G.E.D. in the service; nevertheless, his stint ended with a dishonorable discharge after he was arrested and sentenced to prison in 1960 at the age of nineteen. After three years, Sánchez was paroled in 1963. Soon after his release, he married his wife, María Teresa Silva, yet he struggled to support his growing family. In 1965, shortly before their first child was born, Sánchez was tried and sentenced again for armed robbery. Upon his release from Soledad in 1969, however, Sánchez found his first string of successes as a writer.

== Writing ==
After publishing his work in an edited anthology, Sánchez received a prestigious Frederick Douglass journalism fellowship. In 1970, he was accepted into the doctoral program at Union Institute & University. He received his PhD in American Studies in 1974 and received a tenure track faculty position at Washington State University. While teaching at Washington State, Sánchez continued publishing his work to great acclaim. His collection Hechizospells (1976) was praised as "awesome in its sweep and profundity about the human condition." The poet Maya Angelou described his work: “Ricardo Sanchez is like any great poet. He’s at once a preacher, a teacher, a priest, a rabbi. He’s a guru, he’s a master. And because he is that he’s also a rebel. He’s a maverick. Every great teacher is a maverick.” Sánchez' "raging cries for cultural justice" and "startling, angry verse" are often credited as foundational to the fields of Chicano poetry and modern Chicano literature. He died from cancer in 1995 at the age of 54.

His papers today are held at both the University of Texas at Austin and Stanford University.

== Works ==
- Canto Y Grito Mi Liberación (Washington State University Press, 1971). ISBN 978-0964066205
- Hechizospells (University of California Press, 1976). ISBN 978-0895510242
- Brown Bear Honey Madnesses: Alaskan Cruising Poems (Slough Press, 1981). ISBN 978-0941720076
- Amsterdam Cantos y Poemas Pistos (Place of Herons, 1983). ISBN 978-0916908140
- Selected Poems (Arte Publico Press, 1985). ISBN 978-0934770354
- Bertrand & the Mehkqoverse: A Xicano Filmic Nuance (Slough Press, 1989). ISBN 978-0941720656
- Eagle-Visioned/Feathered Adobes: Manito Sojourns & Pachuco Ramblings October 4 to 24, 1981 (Cinco Puntos Press, 1990). ISBN 978-0938317128
- Amerikan journeys = Jornadas americanas (Rob Lewis, 1995). ISBN 978-0874221251
- The Loves of Ricardo (Tia Chucha Press, 1997). ISBN 978-1882688142 yes

== Bibliographical Resources ==
https://faculty.ucmerced.edu/mmartin-rodriguez/index_files/vhSanchezRicardo.htm

== See also ==
- List of Chicano poets
- Pinto (subculture)
