= Gangaroo =

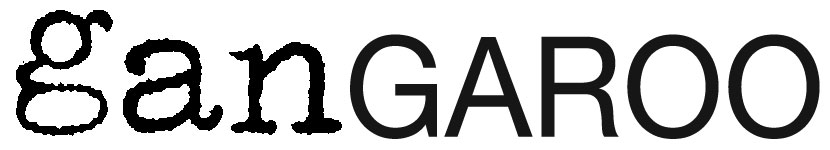
Gangaroo Logo

Gangaroo is the Australian imprint of Austrian publisher Gangan Verlag.

== History ==
In 1989 Gerald Ganglbauer, a young Austrian publisher, arrived in Australia and started collecting Australian short stories, experimental prose, and poetry. Back then Australian literature was largely unknown in German speaking countries, and he had the ambition to change that with Gangaroo (a coinage of the words Ganglbauer and kangaroo), the imprint of now Sydney based small press Gangan Books Austr(al)ia. Together with Bernard Cohen, Rudi Krausmann and Michael Wilding, he created The OZlit Collection in three volumes: Vol. 1: Air Mail from Down Under (Short Stories, translated into German), Vol. 2: Malevolent Fiction, was not published in print, but online (in parts) and Vol. 3: Made in Australia (Poetry, bilingual English/German).

However, in spite of having received good reviews in Germany as well as in Australia, sales were slow, and not even a grant from the Australia Council could help the publisher to break even, which put an end to The OZlit Collection in print. As a consequence, new titles were published online since 1996, and the name changed to Gangan Publishing.

== The OZlit Collection ==
=== Volume 1 ===
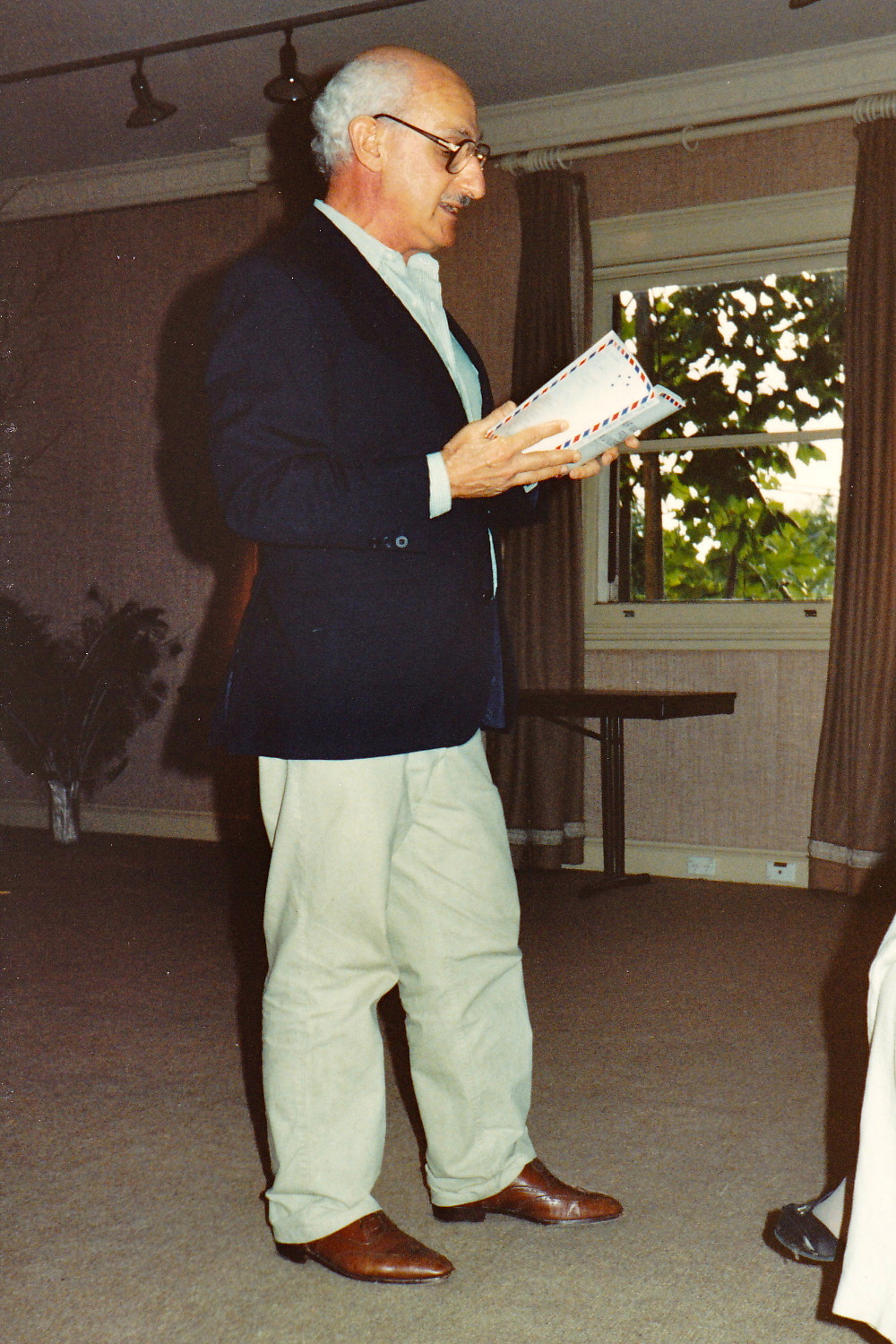
David Malouf reads from Air Mail from Down Under at the Sydney book launch (Goethe-Institut 1991)

- Rudi Krausmann, Michael Wilding: Air Mail from Down Under. Zeitgenössische Literatur Australiens. Short Stories 1990, ISBN 1-86336-000-X

The short stories in Air Mail from Down Under by Glenda Adams, Inez Baranay, David Brooks, Peter Carey, Helen Garner, Kate Grenville, Kris Hemensley, Nick Jose, Rudi Krausmann, David Malouf, Frank Moorhouse, Gerald Murnane, Oodgeroo Noonuccal, Janette Turner Hospital, Vicki Viidikas, Patrick White, Michael Wilding, and Renate Yates were translated into the German language by Marc Adrian, Bettina Boss, Gerald Ganglbauer, Bernd und Barbara Hüppauf, Rudi Krausmann, Olaf Reinhardt, and Nic Witton.

When Gerald Ganglbauer and Michael Wilding launched the first volume in Vienna, an Austrian newspaper titled their review "More than kangaroos and koalas", and wrote: Gangan Verlag proves with this important new release that Australia's cultural output consists of more than "Crocodile" Dundee and The Thorn Birds. The Falter agreed: As far as literature is concerned, Australia is a largely unknown continent even for an Anglophile.

=== Volume 2 ===
- Bernard Cohen, Gerald Ganglbauer, Gregory Harvey: Malevolent Fiction. Australias Experimental Literature (1992) 2017, ISBN 978-1-86336-001-2

With Malevolent Fiction the gap between Volume 1 and 3 is finally closed. Contributions (Jas H Duke, Paul Hewson / Linda Marie Walker, Ruark Lewis, Chris Mann and Ania Walwicz) have appeared online in the publisher's literary magazine Gangway in 1996.

=== Volume 3 ===
- Gisela Triesch, Rudi Krausmann: Made in Australia. Die Poesie des fünften Kontinents, Australian Poetry Today 1994, ISBN 1-86336-002-6

Made in Australia is a bilingual English-German edition of selected work by eighty contemporary Australian poets. This literary crowd, and its host of German apparitions, is squeezed into a mere three hundred pages, as a kind of export package. Each poet's name is actually stamped with the familiar, triangular “Australian Made” trade logo. Poetry as merchandise. Please consider.

The arrangement of the poets Made in Australia is by date of birth, beginning with Margaret Diesendorf, who was born in 1912 and died two years ago, and leading up to poets born in 1960. Obviously, preference and available space determined inclusions and omissions, but few readers will dispute that it is a well-balanced, carefully selected anthology. The inclusion, as the last poem, of Maureen Watson’s “Stepping Out” with its final “I don’t walk, I strut/ ‘Cause now, I’m liberated” provides a very moving ending. There are no dates alongside her name (Unknown, as sometimes the case with Aboriginals having no birth certificates).

Around 140 selected poems from Australian poets such as Robert Adamson, Richard Allen, Bruce Beaver to Banumbir Wongar, Judith Wright, and Fay Zwicky, to name but a few from A to Z were translated into the German language by C. W. Aigner, Hans Magnus Enzensberger, Gerhard Fischer, Gerald Ganglbauer, Rudi Krausmann, Michael C. Prusse, Olaf Reinhardt, Isolde Scheidecker, Gisela Triesch, and Volker Wolf.
