= Australian performance poetry =

Performance poetry is poetry that is specifically composed for or during a performance before an audience. During the 1980s, the term came into popular usage to describe poetry written or composed for performance rather than print distribution, mostly open to improvisation. From that time performance poetry in Australia has found new venues, audiences and expressions.

== History ==
Australian performance poetry is not a recent phenomenon in English-speaking Australia. It would not be beyond credibility to identify Henry Lawson as Australia's first professional performance poet, but there had been many performance poets in Australia prior to Lawson (real name Larsen, Norwegian father) from the First Fleet onwards. In fact prior to 1890 most poetry in Australia was received orally. The Sydney Bulletin began a campaign of publishing Australian poetry in the 1890s,

The 'nationalistic' element fostered overtly at times by Stephens and the Bulletin is indicated in Stephen's review on 15th February 1896, in which he joined Lawson with Paterson as two writers who, 'with all their imperfections' mark 'something like the beginnings of a national school of poetry. In them, for the first time, Australia has found audible voice and characteristic expression'. (Perkins in Bennett and Strauss, 1998)

It is generally acknowledged in most of the histories of Australian literature from H. M. Green's in 1962, to the most recent The Oxford literary history of Australia, 1998, that the Bulletin Bush poetry, in its nationalist mission to be Australian, over-zealously mythologised the nature of the Australian identity and that it promoted that ideal long after Federation (1901) and even long after Lawson and Paterson. A. B. Paterson's Waltzing Matilda is probably the most performed Australian poem ever, and has become somewhat of an unofficial anthem of Australia (in sports particularly). The words of Dorothea Mackellar's My Country, 1908, are probably present in the minds of every Australian, even if they have never seen it written down.

I love a sunburnt country,

a land of sweeping plains,
of rugged mountain ranges,

of droughts and flooding rains.

The sound of that early Australian bush poetry is firmly embedded in the national psyche. The largest selling poetry volume in Australia,. C. J. Dennis's Sentimental Bloke in 1915 was poetry to be performed, and was performed. But the voices in that poem and others by C. J. Dennis are character voices, often exaggerated, of stereotyped Australian voices comically represented. Maybe something akin to Paul Hogan's stereotyping of Italians with his 'luigi' or Mark Mitchell's comic representation of the Greek Australian 'Con the fruiterer', CJ Dennis was also humorously reflecting changes in the Australian voice and cultural identity.

The Jindyworobak poetry movement of South Australia was very much into sounds and introducing Australian sounds into Australian poetry, the sound of the land and the people that had been dispossessed. But this was an appropriation of Aboriginal culture and plagued by dubious political associations. Kenneth Slessor in the 1940s, and Bruce Dawe and Thomas Shapcott, in the 1950s, introduced the sound of everyday Australian voices, incorporating the vernacular and the colloquial language of Australia as part of their poetry. Their voices as heard on the Audio anthology "Australian Poetry : Live (Page, 1995)" are devoid of the BBC British radio announcers accent often used by Australian poets like R. D. Fitzgerald, A. D. Hope and James McAuley when reading verse (even Dylan Thomas discarded his Welsh accent for the BBC British radio voice.) They speak in the Australian vernacular, the common language of the street. The Commonwealth Literary Fund, which in the 1950s toured Australian poets on reading tours of their works, e.g. Roland Robinson, provided another way in which sounded poetry was promoted by that organization. Oodgeroo Noonuccal (Kath Walker) also emerged as an Aboriginal-Australian voice in the late 1950s and early 1960s.

In the 1960s poetry readings were associated with the great poetry explosion that was happening globally but also particularly in Australia due partly to the challenging of the self-proclaimed establishment of university poet-professors led by A. D. Hope. A D Hope strangely enough, due to strict censorship laws and due to sexually explicit nature of his poetry, was more likely to have been heard than read as he didn't publish his poetry until the early 1960s. It seems public readings were not the preference of academia at the time, as Tasmanian poet Tim Thorne writes in his personal memoirs,

I remember my first public reading, as an undergraduate in the early 1960s. It was organized by James McAuley and it consisted of him and me reading our own poems and those of Vivian Smith and Gwen Harwood. Gwen and Vivian were allegedly too shy to read their own. Both, however, were in the audience, and I was acutely aware of their presence as I hoped I did their poems justice. Having got to know Gwen much better in later years, I am amazed that she could have offered such an excuse. (Thorne, 2003)

International poets like Yevgeny Yevtushenko, Ted Hughes, Adrian Mitchell from the UK, Allen Ginsberg and Lawrence Ferlinghetti from the US, came to Adelaide Arts Festival Writers' Week in the late 1960s and early 1970s and gave great, as reported in the newspapers, public performances to town hall's full of people. Postmodernist Hedwig Gorski coined the term "performance poetry" after the strong influences of performing Beat poets like Ginsberg and John Giorno who produced audio recordings of their print poems.

Geoffrey Dutton wrote in the Bulletin: "Maybe Yevtushenko is the man who will give the relation between poet and public in Australia the tremendous lift it badly needs and so easily might achieve". Bruce Dawe believed that Yevtushenko's visit would "help to establish in people's minds that poetry is not necessarily and forbiddingly long-hair or academic". (Starke, 1998) That is one of the lasting influences of performing and performance poets.

By the 1970s there was a great push in Australia for the voices to be heard that were other to the Anglo-centric male dominated majority, i.e. women, migrants from non-English speaking backgrounds, indigenous Australians, disabled and gendered persons. For many the poetry reading was the place to be heard. There were many poetry groups and much performance activity in the 1970s. Andrew Taylor, a foundation member of the Friendly Street poetry readings in Adelaide wrote in the Number Ten Friendly Street poetry reader; acknowledging the cultural as well as literary value of poetry readings;

In 1975 we had all (Richard Tipping, Ian Reid and Andrew Taylor) recently returned to Adelaide from various extended periods overseas, including time in the United States where small, public poetry readings were very popular and frequent. Many of these were held in bookshops or bars – unelaborate, even casual occasions whose value was to be found as much in the opportunity they gave people to get together with a purpose as in the poetry that was read. Why we asked was nothing of this kind happening in Adelaide? (Harris and Josephi, 1986)

Very early in the 1970s University of Queensland Press released a series of 12 poets on vinyl 45 rpm 7" records, featuring older and newer Australian poets reading their work. This was a milestone publication in Australian poetic culture, the first commercially available sound recording of twelve of Australia's most prominent poets of the time.

As early as 1973 Eric Beach had started to work as a full-time, grossly under-paid poet, conducting workshops at schools and performing and was a recipient of a grant from the newly formed Australia Council for the Arts. Ania Walwicz, Vicki Viidikas, thalia, Sylvia Kantazaris, Anna Couani, and Pi O emerged as strong non-Anglo voices in performance poetry, and Kate Jennings's anthology of women writers Mother i'm rooted, 1975, highlighted the lack of women in Australian poetry anthologies. Most of the new women writers had engaged with poetry through the activity of poetry readings and not the formal Anglo-centric male dominated academic poetry of the universities. In 1976 the Poets Union was formed, identifying that poetry was indeed work and workers needed to be represented by a union to negotiate their demands. New readings, often centred around performance were held in Sydney by the 'militant' Poets Union there and were the genesis of the later pub poetry in that city. Chris Mansell and Les Wicks, among others, were prime movers in this new movement, organising readings and publishing Compass and Meuse (with Bill Farrow) respectively. The Poets Union pushed for better conditions for poets at the Sydney Festival, which then included writers, and successfully gained recognition and payment.

Dorothy Porter and Robert Adamson, Sydney poets, refused to attend the 1976 Writers' Week of Adelaide Festival because they were not going to be paid for their invited readings. (Starke, 1998) In 1978 a contingent of poets' union members attended the Writers' Week in Adelaide and Pi O claims in his anthology of performance poetry (PiO, 1985) that the term 'performance poetry' was coined at a seminar where David Malouf was speaking. But this is not the first time the term was used outside of Australia. This event definitely marked the beginning of the use of the term 'performance poets' as Ruth Starke notes in Writers, readers and rebels, 1998. However it was not the first instance of the call for the performing of poetry. The coinage of the term that matches with the commonly accepted definition of performance poetry is credited, however, to American poet Hedwig Gorski, who used it in fliers and posters in the mid-1970s. The term was used to describe Gorski performances in the Austin Chronicle almost two decades prior to the reported use of the term in the 1998 publication by Ruth Starke. Performance poets write poems only for performance and not for print. Performing poets are those who use theatrics when presenting their print poems to an audience. The description below clearly points to performing poets reading their poems written for print:

'If poets are going to perform in front of large audiences, then they ought to learn how to project their voices, or how to use a microphone; otherwise they should introduce the poem and let someone else read it,' wrote Geoffrey Dutton (ABR, April 1970), after the 1970 Writers' Week. (Starke, 1998)

The performing poets, in 1978, were recognised as a group, or movement, or new cultural formation, separate from published poets for the first time. Jenny Boult in Adelaide had also attained professional status as a performing poet by the end of the 1970s. There were many other semi-professionals, like Ken Smeaton, Geoffrey Eggleston and Shelton Lea in Victoria, but the majority held full-time jobs and did their performing as a secondary activity.

=== 1980s and after ===
The 1980s saw a greater development in performed poetry, with more professional poets earning their living by poetry, Geoff Goodfellow joined Jenny Boult in South Australia, komninos, Myron Lysenko, Liz Hall, Billy Marshall Stoneking, Lauren Williams, Kerry Scuffins, Kerry Loughrey, Carmel Bird, in Melbourne, Grant Caldwell, Chris Mansell, Les Wicks and Steven Herrick in Sydney and others in other states. The mid-1980s also saw major literary events enter the public sphere. Literary readings were usually restricted to academics, publishers, writers and readers and Writers' Week programs, although in Sydney there were readings in Balmain, notably in the Cafe L'Absurd where poets such as Nigel Roberts, Chris Mansell, Cornelis Vleeskens and Rae Desmond Jones often performed and were joined by interstate and international readers on occasions. Later Cafe L'Absurd moved to Newtown and became known as New Partz where it became the centre of Sydney performed poetry and attracted performance and so-called page poets. In Melbourne Readings Bookshop and Mietta's Hotel held a regular Sunday afternoon reading that attracted 200–300 people. Later, in Sydney Writers In The Park, had weekly events at the Harold Park Hotel in Glebe, supported by local book-seller Glebebooks, the writing programs of UTS and UNSW, the feminist performance poetry groups of Newtown, Paddington and Surry Hills, attracting up to 400 people a night (Christie and O'Brien, 1986). In Brisbane, Talk it down, at the Storey Bridge Hotel at Kangaroo Point had weekly readings that drew large mixed crowds of poetry lovers and public bar drinkers alike. Readings had a renewed boom in the mid-1980s and regular readings have since been held in all capital cities and many towns in Australia.

This growth of performance poetry in cafes and pubs came with attempts to appeal to a broader audience. Performance work was generally more accessible, and saw Confessional poetry flourish, with its roots in autobiography. Jack Bedson mocked this trend in his Performance Poetry:

Words are difficult at best, but

pressed, I'd have to say
(that is, you would have to read)
this is not performance stuff -
sure it rhymes, it's rough, it's
built on borrowed phrases, but
is that enough? ... I mean to say
I'm not into performance poetry, OK?
Not one of those who, closing up the book
resume their seat with a sidelong look
that says "How was it for you?". Crook
my restive eyes try gently to reply.
In fact I'm not into public crucifixion
the way I'm not into performance coition:
I'll meet you on the private page,

between the sheets. OK?

A notable manifestation of Australian performance poetry occurred in Sydney in early 1991, when ten poets, including Pi O, Billy Marshall Stoneking, Amanda Stewart, Jas H. Duke, and others, teamed up with jazz musician Jenny Sheard, to create, direct and produce the first ever, poet-performed/directed and produced, dramatic verse play ever presented. Entitled CALL IT POETRY/TONIGHT, the show was made up entirely of the poems of the poets who were performing and involved unusual presentations of their work, including a kind of cinema noir voice-over rendition of Grant Caldwell's "famous" letter poem as well as several poems broken up into dialogues between the poets themselves. Rehearsals as well as the actual show were archived on broadcast-quality video, which was later edited and screened - as CALL IT POETRY - round the world. In the television production, several of the performances were presented as "concrete poems", with video graphic overlays, including Jas H Duke's legendary DADA Poem. Copies of the program as well as all the rushes are available through the Librarian, Australian Defence Force Academy, Canberra, ACT.

There are now poets who write primarily for performance rather than the page and, whereas good readers were once more scarce than good poets, these people are very much 'performers' rather than just 'readers'. (Haskell, 1998:275)

Until the mid-1980s poetry readings in public places had been the domain of well paid international poets from the US, Russia and the UK. Les Murray wrote in Quadrant in April 1977, that he would never be asked to read in the Town Hall during Writers' Week, "when the overseas heavies come around, we are shown our true place in the estimation of our cultural establishments. We are just about good enough to sleep on friends' floors and read our work in a tent." (Starke, 1998) But the performing poets had been having small readings in public places, hotels and coffee lounges, since the early 1970s. By the mid-1980s Les Murray and the performing poets were sharing large public stages in Sydney, Melbourne and Brisbane.

The sounding of poetry in Australia has always been present but in most historical accounts it has not been emphasised as an activity, always assumed to be a supplementary activity to the industry of print publishing. Even when the oral transmission and aural appreciation of poetry dominated the aesthetics and poetics of Australian poetry and in the absence of sound recording devices, our record of these works remain as printed texts. The texts contained the 'sound' of the poems in their metre and rhyming patterns. Charles Bernstein's Close Listening, published in 1998 was the first attempt to present a collection of essays from American sound poets and performance poets that treated the field as a worthy topic of research. Bernstein borrowed Gorski's term (1978) to describe her poems written only to be spoken and recorded. It had by the publication of Bernstien's book in 1998, been extended in popular usage to include other types of spoken word texts featured in the anthology.

Since the 1950s, the poetry reading has become one of the most important sites for the dissemination of poetic works in North America, yet studies of the distinctive features of the poem-in-performance have been rare (even full-length studies of a poet's work routinely ignore the audiotext), and readings no matter how well attended are rarely reviewed by newspapers or magazines. (Bernstein, 1998)

Unlike the US, Australia lacks any real academic discourse in the field of performance poetry or poets; there are few prizes, no courses of study at universities, no peer-reviewed journals, few histories, few national anthologies, little that could be considered a body of information for the study and analysis of performance poetry. There are reports that have appeared in the daily press and on radio and television, and the memories of readings attended. In 2001 Anne McBurnie provided an anthology, Prize Winning Australian Performance Poetry, which was aimed at primary school students. A second volume followed in the next year. In the US, Def Poetry and Slams are the legacy of performing poets like Allen Ginsberg and the Beats, and those like Hedwig Gorski who eschewed writing for print and publishing their poems in books in favor of recording and radio broadcast. Academia associates the American performance poetry movement to a history of African American oral culture in its current manifestation as Def Poetry and Slam. Australia has yet to examine how Aboriginal oral culture and classical oral traditions fit into the history of 'soundings.'

Since the 1960s, when regular rhyme and rhythm in poetry became replaced by a more freestyle expression, and the public soundings of these works relied less on familiar rhythms and more on the political, social and psychological interpretation of the words, sounded poetry, has been appreciated for many other qualities. The sound of words and word combinations, fragments of sentences, repetitions, mirroring within the text, alliteration and assonance and even internal rhyming became devices in the writing, and the line the basic unit of the poem, the breath determining the rhythm. The performing poets in 1978 drew attention to themselves as a new cultural formation and to the fact that there were poets dedicated to the sounding of poetry as their primary poetic activity and that poetry could be written not only for print, but exclusively or primarily for sounding. Obviously the print poets who were being asked to present their work to public audiences at State Writers' Festivals in the 1980s, must have felt intimidated by the performing poets that they shared the stages with, but history tells us they also had much to learn from them as well.

Indeed, the value of the poetry reading (sounding) as a social and cultural form can be partly measured by its resistance, up to this point, to reification or commodification. It is a measure of its significance that it is ignored. That is, the (cultural) invisibility of the poetry reading is what makes its audibility so audacious. Its relative absence as an institution makes the poetry reading the ideal site for the presence of language for listening and being heard, for hearing and for being listened to. (Bernstein, 1998)

Attendance at any Writers Festival in any State these days will confirm the quality of sounded works, and the emphasis placed on the importance of soundings by authors of their work in public. The new Australian poetry made poetry readings central to poetic culture: at Friendly Street (Adelaide), La Mama (Melbourne) at New Partz and later at Harold Park (Sydney). "Readings have now become ubiquitous for Australian poets." (McCooey in Webby, 2000, pg169). Local poetry groups and organisations have increasingly turned to performing poetry alongside, or instead of publishing it. The Red Room Company has made this combination the basis of their public poetry projects, commissioning and presenting staged performances of work, often within spatial installations.

As well as sounded poetry that explores the phonic qualities of words and lines and stanzas, there is also Sound Poetry, a small but worldwide movement of the late 1960s that experimented with the sonic quality of the sounds that make up spoken language. Sound poetry with practitioners in the UK, the Fylkingen group in Sweden, the Fluxus and L=A=N=G=U=A=G=E poets and the second wave Beats of the US, the French sound poets Henri Chopin, Bernard Heidsieck, etc. was represented in Australia by some exceptional sound poets that received international recognition in this field. Jas H. Duke and Ania Walwicz, in Melbourne and Amanda Stewart and Chris Mann in Sydney, were influential, great performers and unique in style and content. Sound poetry remained very much a fringe activity of Australian poetry until the mid-1980s. But an international festival of Sound Poetry, SOUNDWORKS curated by Nicholas Zurbrugg and Nick Tsoutas at Performance Space as part of the Sydney Biennale in 1986 highlighted the intensity of the activity in Australia over the previous 15 years. (Zurbrugg and Tsoutas, 1986)

One way or another, all of the artists performing at the SOUNDWORKS festival splice cut, heighten, release and more or less transform the creative potential of words, sounds and gestures, be these live, recorded, filmed, projected, or various combinations of all these possibilities. (Zurbrugg, 1986)

== See also ==
- Australian literature
- List of performance poets (Australia)
- List of Australian poets
