= Michael Crane =

Michael Crane may refer to:

- Michael Crane (cricketer) (born 1982), Bermudian cricketer
- Michael Crane (writer) (born 1961), Australian poet and writer
- Michael Joseph Crane (1863–1928), American prelate of the Roman Catholic Church
- Mike Crane (born 1963), member of the Georgia State Senate
- Mick Crane (1952–2022), British rugby league player

== See also ==
- Michael Crain (born 1974), American guitarist
