= Gangway =

A gangway is a passageway through which to enter or leave.

Gangway may also refer to:

== Passageways ==
- Gangway (nautical), a passage between the quarterdeck and the forecastle of a ship, and by extension, a passage through the side of a ship, an opening in the railing, or an articulated bridge or ramp, through which she may be boarded
- Jet bridge, a passenger boarding bridge to an airplane
- Any aisle (in British English)
- Any temporary passageway, such as one made of planks or at a construction site

== Other uses ==
- Gangway (band), a Danish pop band
- Gangway (film), a 1937 British musical film
- Gangway (gay bar), a gay bar in San Francisco
- Gangway (magazine), an online literary magazine

== See also ==
- Brake Gangwayed, a type of railway brake van
- Gangway connection, a connector between gangways of railway passenger cars
