= Gangway (magazine) =

International online literary magazine

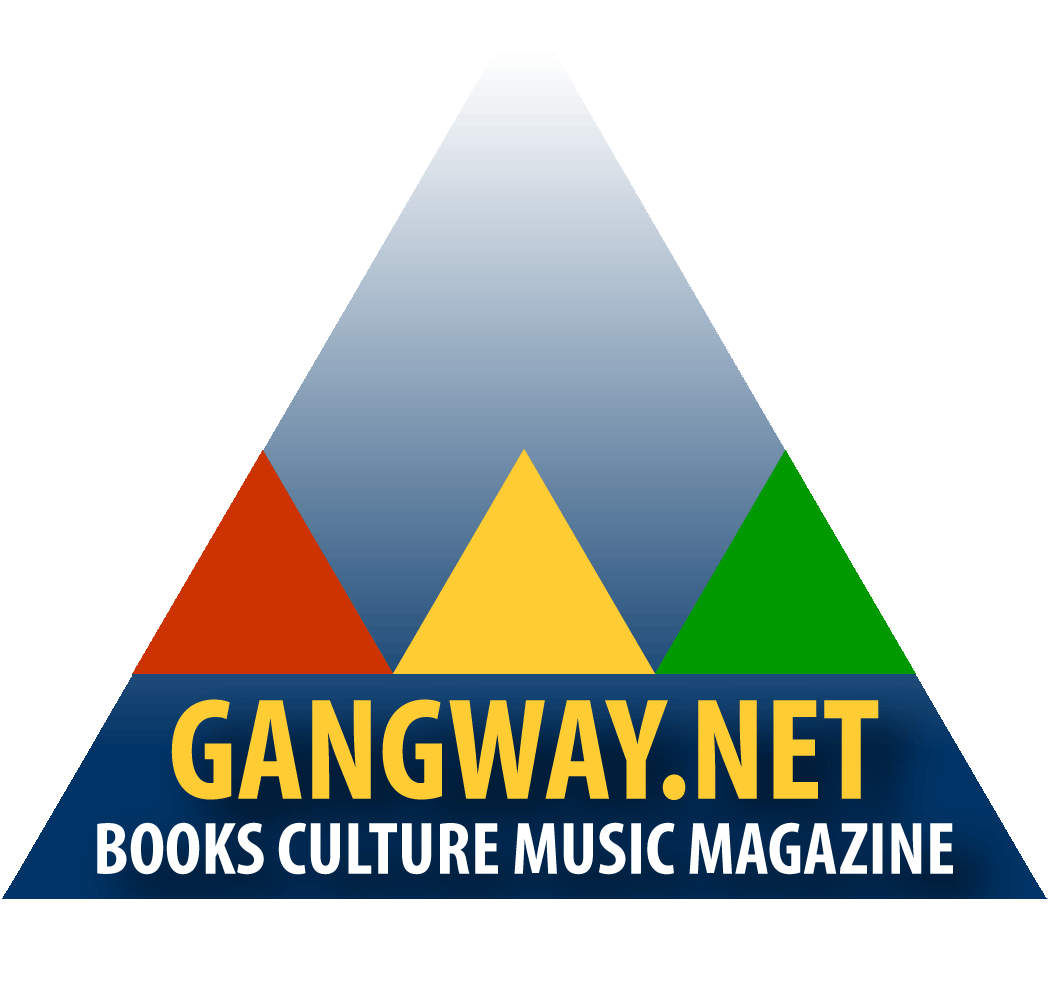
- International Literary Magazine
- Editor: Gerald Ganglbauer
- Publisher: Gangan Verlag
- First issue: June 1996
- Country: Austria/Australia
- Language: German/English
- ISSN: 1327-7073

Gangway was an international online literary magazine, bridging Austria and Australia. Its founder and editor in chief is Gerald Ganglbauer, the first issue was launched in June 1996 in Sydney. It appears not to have published since 2016.

== Profile ==
Published quarterly since 1996 in Vienna, Graz, and Sydney, Gangway appeared as one of the first literary journals on the internet, and has currently over 40 issues online, in both the German and the English language. The magazine has a focus on expatriates showcasing their contemporary writing, poems, short stories, and experimental prose. It also contains book reviews, interviews, and special features. Gangway is digitally archived by DILIMAG (Digitale Literaturmagazine) at the University of Innsbruck, Austria, and by the Australian National Library, Canberra ACT.

After launching Gangway #32 – Gangan Verlag's 20th anniversary issue, at the Literaturhaus Graz in June 2004, Gerald Ganglbauer introduced conceptual changes: Since Gangway appeared as one of the first literary journals on the internet in 1996, many more have come (and some have already gone), therefore I believe that it is imperative to create a defined niche. Hence the general focus of Gangway will be shifted from bilingual Australian and/or Austrian authors to the global community of expat writers living abroad – provided they write in – or are translated into – the English or German language. Since then themed issues were infrequently compiled by guest editors. Reviews, interviews, and special features also continued to appear from time to time. In 2009, Ganglbauer installed Twitter updates, and the original Yahoo! Groups writers' community was replaced by a Facebook fan page.

== Authors ==
Amongst hundreds of published authors are the Australians Michael Crane, the late Jas H. Duke, Geoffrey Gates, Antigone Kefala, Rudi Krausmann, Ania Walwicz, and from Austria Manfred Chobot, Margret Kreidl, and Erika Kronabitter, to name but a few. Gangway also first published works in translation, e.g. from Australian poet Amanda Stewart, and Austrian poet Ingeborg Bachmann. Some of the contemporary writers recently featured in Gangway No. 40 – Expatriations: The expatriate edition, were: Vahni Capildeo, Ken Edwards, Laurie Duggan, Louis Armand, and David Miller. A complete list of all Gangway authors is maintained online.

== Editors ==
=== Contributing editors ===
- Petra Ganglbauer (Vienna). Reviews editor since 2000.
- Andrea Bandhauer (Sydney). Co-editor from 1998 to 2000.
- Lisa Fischnaller (Linz). Contributing editor from 1999 to 2003.
- Mike Markart (Styria). Contributing editor from 1999 to 2003.
- Clare Moss (Sydney). Co-editor in 2001.

=== Guest editors ===
- Shane Jesse Christmass (Newcastle). Guest editor in 2002.
- Hop Dac (Newcastle). Guest editor in 2002.
- Cyril Wong (Singapore). Guest editor in 2005.
- Tatjana Lukić (born 1959; died 2008 in Canberra). Guest editor in 2005/2006.
- Gabriele Pötscher (Graz). Guest editor in 2007.
- Walter Hölbling (Graz). Guest editor in 2007.
- Andrea Ghoneim-Rosenauer (Vienna/Cairo). Guest editor in 2008.
- Michael Haeflinger (Berlin). Guest editor in 2009.
- Helen Lambert (Sydney/Dublin). Guest editor in 2010.
- Andrew Madigan (Al Ain, UAE). Guest editor in 2011.
- Karin Seidner-Macke (Vienna). Guest editor in 2012.
- Bev Braune (Sydney). Guest editor in 2014.
