= Billy Marshall Stoneking =

American writer (1947–2016)

William Randolph Marshall (31 August 1947 – 15 July 2016), better known as Billy Marshall Stoneking, was an American-Australian poet, playwright, filmmaker, and teacher. His son C.W. Stoneking is a musician.

== Childhood and education ==
William Randolph Marshall was born in Orlando, Florida, on 31 August 1947. He was the second child of Charles and Florence Marshall. His sister, Barbara, named him "Randolph" after her favourite movie actor, Randolph Scott, and his mother selected "William" after an old family friend. The name "Stoneking" derives from his paternal great-grandfather, Reuben Stoneking (of Hundred, WV, Wetzel County).

According to Stoneking's own biographical notes, his early years were spent growing up on military bases around the United States, including Randolph Field (Texas) and Fort Slocum (New York). When his father retired in 1961, the family moved to northern California where he attended high school in Folsom and Rancho Cordova, California. He graduated from California State University, Sacramento, in 1970, majoring in English with minors in philosophy and education.

In 1972, Stoneking migrated to Australia. "The bumper stickers said, 'America, love it or leave it', so I left."

In 1983, after more than a decade living in Australia, four years of which were spent living with tribal Aboriginal people 275 km west northwest of Alice Springs, Stoneking graduated from the Australian Film, Television and Radio School in Sydney, specialising in screenwriting.

"The drama in which the screenwriter, playwright, poet is occupied is the endless struggle between panic and pure anxiety, between the drive for self-preservation and the desire not to falsify the evidence. Whilst these two 'wants' may seem to be eternally at odds with one another, the point is not to surrender one in favour of the other bit to manage and exploit the dynamic tension inherent in the conflict."

— Billy Marshall Stoneking

== Career ==
=== Teaching ===
After Stoneking arrived in Australia in 1972, he worked for many years as a high school teacher. His ties to teaching and pedagogy motivated him to spend four years at Papunya Aboriginal Settlement in the Northern Territory, during which time he collected stories for use in a bilingual reading program. Between 2000 and 2007, he spent seven years teaching screenwriting at the Australian Film, Television and Radio School (AFTRS).

=== Writing ===
Stoneking has published his poems in magazines around Australia, and was also active in the performance poetry movement, which included fellow poets Pi O, Amanda Stewart and Jas H. Duke. His poems have been featured in the Oxford Book of Australian Poetry (edited by Les Murray) and The Penguin Book of Modern Australian Poetry (edited by John Tranter and Philip Mead).

He was also the author of seven books, including Lasseter, In Quest of Gold (published by Hodder & Stoughton in 1989), Singing the Snake: Poems from the Western Desert 1979–1988 (published by Angus & Robertson in 1990) and an autobiography: Taking America Out of the Boy (published by Hodder Spectrum in 1993).

=== Screenplays ===
In 1982, Stoneking entered the full-time screenwriting program of the Australian Film, Television and Radio School.

Stoneking's first films were made in the mid-1980s, including a chronicle of his work at Papunya Aboriginal Settlement, Desert Stories. He also edited many television scripts, and was the co-creator/writer of Stringer, the AFI award-winning drama series. He also wrote a script for one of the episodes of Mission: Impossible (1988 TV series), which was broadcast during that show's two year revival (1988–1990). He also penned the full-length stage play Sixteen Words for Water.

=== Script editor, producer and story consultant ===
Stoneking was a teacher of dramatic writing. His "Drama of Screenwriting" workshop has been held in every capital city in Australia and New Zealand.

He was one of the script editors on the AFI-nominated Australian feature Chopper (2000).

Stoneking produced a number of small films, including Nosepeg's Movie and Jelly's Placenta. He was the executive producer of the documentary Gayby Baby.

Stoneking died in 2016 at the age of 68.

== Selected bibliography ==
Poetry collections

- Ear Ink: Poems (Papunya, NT: Dead Center Vanity Press, 1979).
- Singing the Snake: Poems from the Western Desert 1979–1988 (Sydney: Angus and Robertson, 1990).

Novels

- Stringer (1988)
- The Speed of Darkness (1989)

Other

- Sixteen Words for Water (Sydney: Angus and Robertson, 1991) ISBN 9780207174124 – drama
- Taking America Out of the Boy (1993) ISBN 9780340584491 – autobiography
