= Tatjana Lukić =

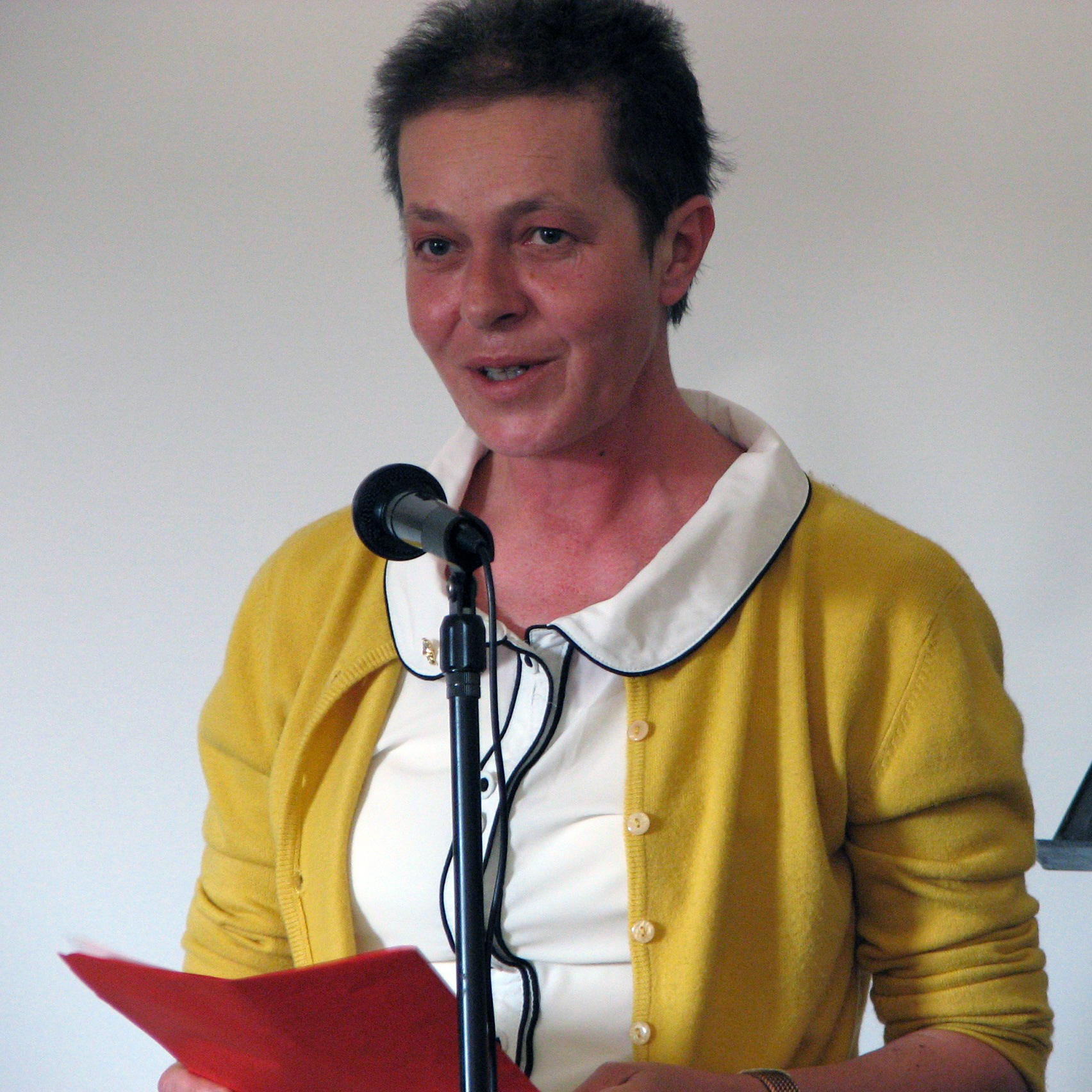
Tatjana Lukić reading at Poetry Without Borders, 2 September 2007.

Tatjana Lukić (25 August 1959 – 10 August 2008) was a Croatian born Australian poetry editor and poet.

== Life ==
Tatjana Lukić was born in Osijek, Croatia, in the former Yugoslavia, where she spent her first 33 years. She received degrees in philosophy and sociology from Sarajevo University, and lived in Bosnia, Croatia, Serbia and the Czech Republic before leaving the region during the Balkan Wars in Croatia and Bosnia. In 1992, she arrived, with her young family, as a refugee in Australia. Lukić spoke no English upon her arrival, but she mastered the language following a period of studying and working.

Prior to her move to Australia, Lukić had published poetry books throughout former Yugoslavia, and won national poetry awards. In recent years she started to write again, now in English. Her English poems have appeared in international literary journals, such as Gangway, SubtleTea, and Versal. In 2005, she was guest editor of Gangway #36 - Home and Homecoming.

Lukić lived in Canberra with her daughter Jelena, where she died of cancer in 2008, 15 days shy of her 49th birthday. Laurie Duggan wrote about her poetry: "these poems written in their author's second language have a certainty about them that belies the difficulties Lukić must have encountered at all stages of her writing life. They are tough, tender, resilient. It is so much more than a great pity that her first book in English should also be her last."

Lukić was a quantitative sociologist whose collaborative work on immigrant women was published in 2001, in the collection edited by Rita J. Simon titled "Immigrant women" and also in Gender Studies.

== Bibliography ==
=== Serbo-Croatian ===
- Povijedanje začetak poja, Matica srpska, Novi Sad, 1980.
- Šta šutim (What I am silent about), Svjetlost, Sarajevo, 1984.
- Izbor (Choice), Mali katalog poezije, Osijek, 1985.
- Saslusanje (Hearing), Nolit, Belgrade, 1988.

=== English ===
- Vertigo, in: Passages Through Parenthood, edited by Anne Godfrey, Lothian Books, 2000.
- la, la, la, 5 Islands Press, 2009.
