= Rudi Krausmann =

Austrian-born Australian playwright and poet (1933–2019)

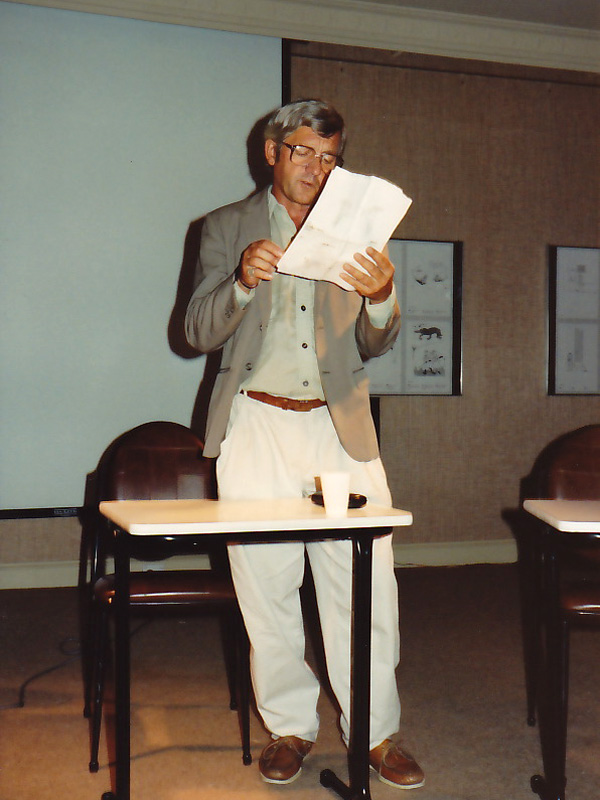
Gangan Verlag book launch at the Goethe-Institut Sydney (1991)

Rudi Krausmann (23 July 1933 in Mauerkirchen, Salzburg – 15 March 2019 in Sydney) was an Austrian born Australian playwright and poet.

== Life ==
Rudi Krausmann studied Economics in Vienna and worked as a journalist for the Austrian newspaper, Salzburger Nachrichten. In 1958 he migrated to Australia where he worked as a part-time German tutor, freelance-writer and as a broadcaster on Radio 2EA-FM and 2SER-FM. He founded and from 1975 to 1989 also edited Aspect: Art and Literature magazine, and was presenter of the German Language Program on SBS Radio.

Starting in 1969 he had books published by small presses including Wild & Woolley and Hale & Iremonger (Sydney). From 1989 to 1994 he was translator (with Gerald Ganglbauer and others) and editor (with Michael Wilding and Gisela Triesch) for the Austrian-Australian Gangaroo (Gangan Verlag, Vienna). He collaborated with visual artists including Garry Shead and Andrew Sibley in printing numbered and signed limited edition books. He lived in Sydney, on and off, but spent several years in Bundeena.

Krausmann died in Sydney on 15 March 2019.

== Bibliography ==
=== Books ===
- From Another Shore. Prose by Rudi Krausmann. Drawings by Brett Whiteley. (Wild & Woolley, 1975)
- The Water Lily and Other Poems. Poems by Rudi Krausmann. (Makar Press, 1977)
- Recent German Poetry. Edited by Rudi Krausmann. (Aspect Publications, 1977)
- Paradox: Man and Beast: Stones. Poems by Rudi Krausmann. Illustrations by Lorraine Krausmann. (Aspect Publications, 1981)
- Life is Nothing New. Poems by Rudi Krausmann. (1982)
- Flowers of Emptiness. Poems by Rudi Krausmann. (Hale & Iremonger, 1982)
- Literature. Written and Edited by Rudi Krausmann. Photographs Michal Kluvanek, Vivienne Mehes & Effy Alexakis. (1987)
- Air mail from Down Under: Zeitgenössische Literatur aus Australien. Short Stories. Edited by Rudi Krausmann and Michael Wilding. (Gangan Verlag, 1990)
- Poems: Rudi Krausmann. Drawings: Gary Shead. (Gangan Verlag / Wild & Woolley, 1991)
- Made in Australia: Die Poesie des fünften Kontinents. Australian Poetry Today: Gegenwartsdichtung Australiens. Bilingual. Edited by Rudi Krausmann and Gisela Triesch. (Gangan Verlag, 1994)
- The Journey and Other Poems. Poems by Rudi Krausmann. Drawings by Gary Shead. (Gangan Verlag, 1999)
- Maps. Poems in German and English by Rudi Krausmann. Illustrations by Andrew Sibley. (2002)
- News. Poems in German and English by Rudi Krausmann. Illustrations by Gary Shead. (2006)

=== Plays ===
- Everyman: a sentence situation. (1978)
- The Leader. (Broadcast on ABC Radio National, 1980)
- Three Plays. (Hale & Iremonger, 1989)
- Whisky on Snow. (Broadcast on ABC Radio National, 1999)
