= Ganglbauer =

Ganglbauer is a surname. Notable people with the surname include:

- Cölestin Josef Ganglbauer (1817–1889), Austrian cardinal
- Gerald Ganglbauer (born 1958), Austrian-Australian writer and publisher
- Ludwig Ganglbauer (1856–1912), Austrian entomologist
