= Cedar Park, Philadelphia =

Cedar Park
- Neighborhood of Philadelphia
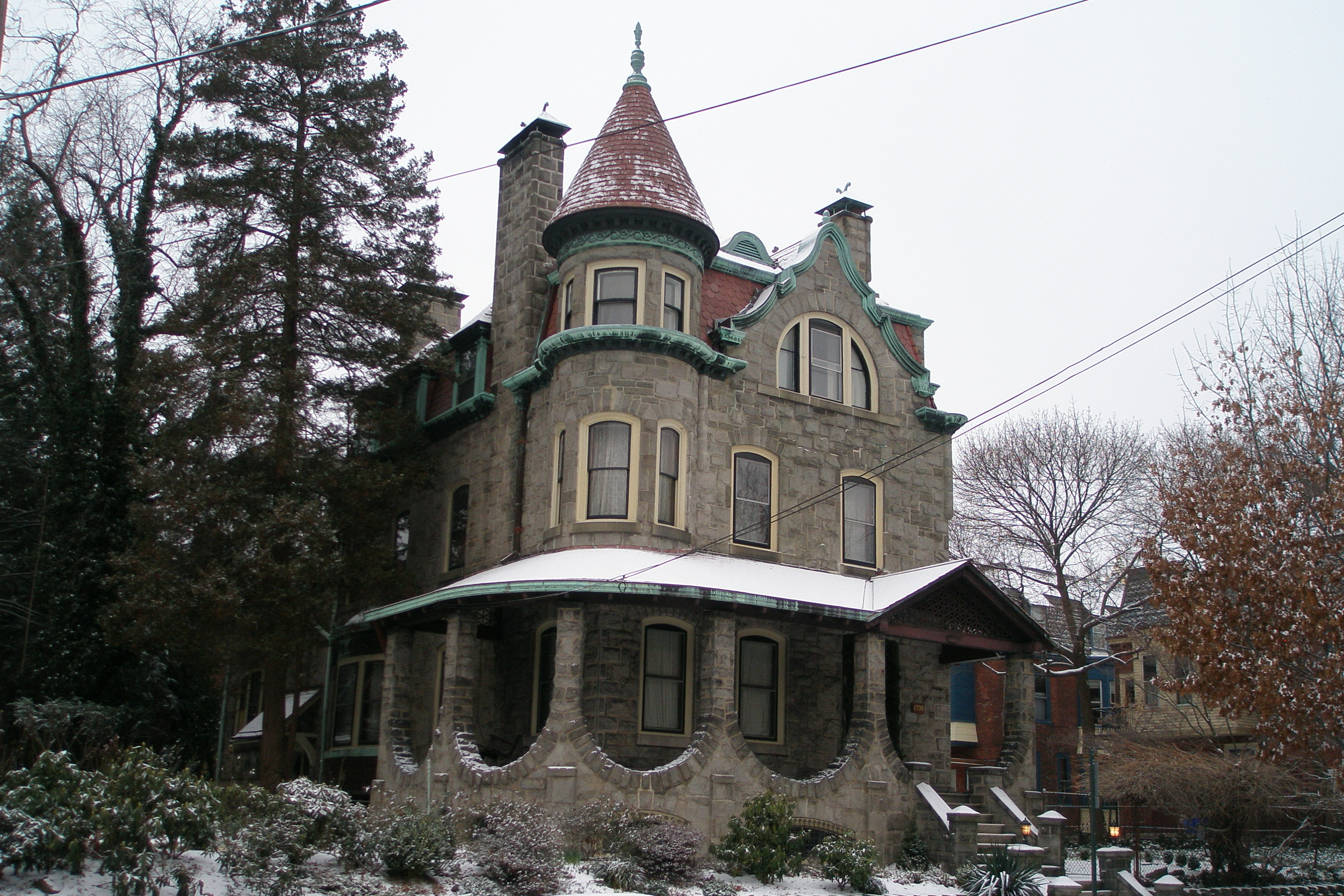
- Home in Cedar Park

- Location within Philadelphia
- Coordinates: 39°56′49″N 75°12′58″W
- Country: United States
- State: Pennsylvania
- County: Philadelphia
- City: Philadelphia
- Area codes: 215, 267, and 445

Cedar Park is a neighborhood of Philadelphia, Pennsylvania, United States. Located in the larger West Philadelphia district, it stretches north to Larchwood Avenue, south to Kingsessing Avenue, east to 46th Street, and west to 52nd Street.

== History ==
Previously outlying farmland, Cedar Park was built between 1850 and 1910 as a streetcar suburb of Center City. Its development as a suburb accelerated with the installation of horsecars in the 1850s and again with the arrival of electric trolley lines in 1892.

The name of the neighborhood is derived from a city owned park, also called Cedar Park, that is at 50th Street and Baltimore Avenue. The land was purchased by the city in 1908 and a city ordinance was signed into law in 1911 declaring it Cedar Park. There is no official explanation as to the name, but it may have been derived from the Cedar Avenue Improvement Organization, who led efforts into ensuring there was a park.

The neighborhood is racially and ethnically diverse, and much of the historic Queen Anne-style architecture still stands.

Since the late 1990s, the neighborhood has been undergoing gentrification, stimulated by the University of Pennsylvania's redevelopment plan for West Philadelphia. There is a distinct progressive-politics mien to the neighborhood and a sizable African immigrant community located along and near Baltimore Avenue between 45th and 52nd Streets. Cedar Park's residents are predominantly Jamaican/Caribbean and African immigrants, but many are U.S.-born African-American, Asian-American, or white. As of the 2020 Census, there were 8,752 people residing in Cedar Park. The racial composition of the neighborhood was 52.6% White alone, 31.0% Black alone, 5.4% Asian alone, 0.3% American Indian and Alaska Native alone, 2.0% some other race, and 8.7% multiracial. 7.1% of residents were Hispanic or Latino.

== Education ==
The neighborhood is host to Saint Francis de Sales School, a private, Catholic School located in the St. Francis De Sales Church at 47th Street and Springfield Avenue. The School District of Philadelphia operates Henry C. Lea Elementary School just outside the neighborhood at 47th Street and Locust street.

== Public Transit ==
SEPTA services the neighborhood with bus routes, two subway–service trolley lines), and one regional rail stop along the Media/Wawa Line. The regional rail stop is 49th Street Station, located at 49th Street and Chester Avenue.

=== Bus Routes ===
21, 42, 52, 64

=== Trolley Lines ===
T2, T3

== Gallery ==
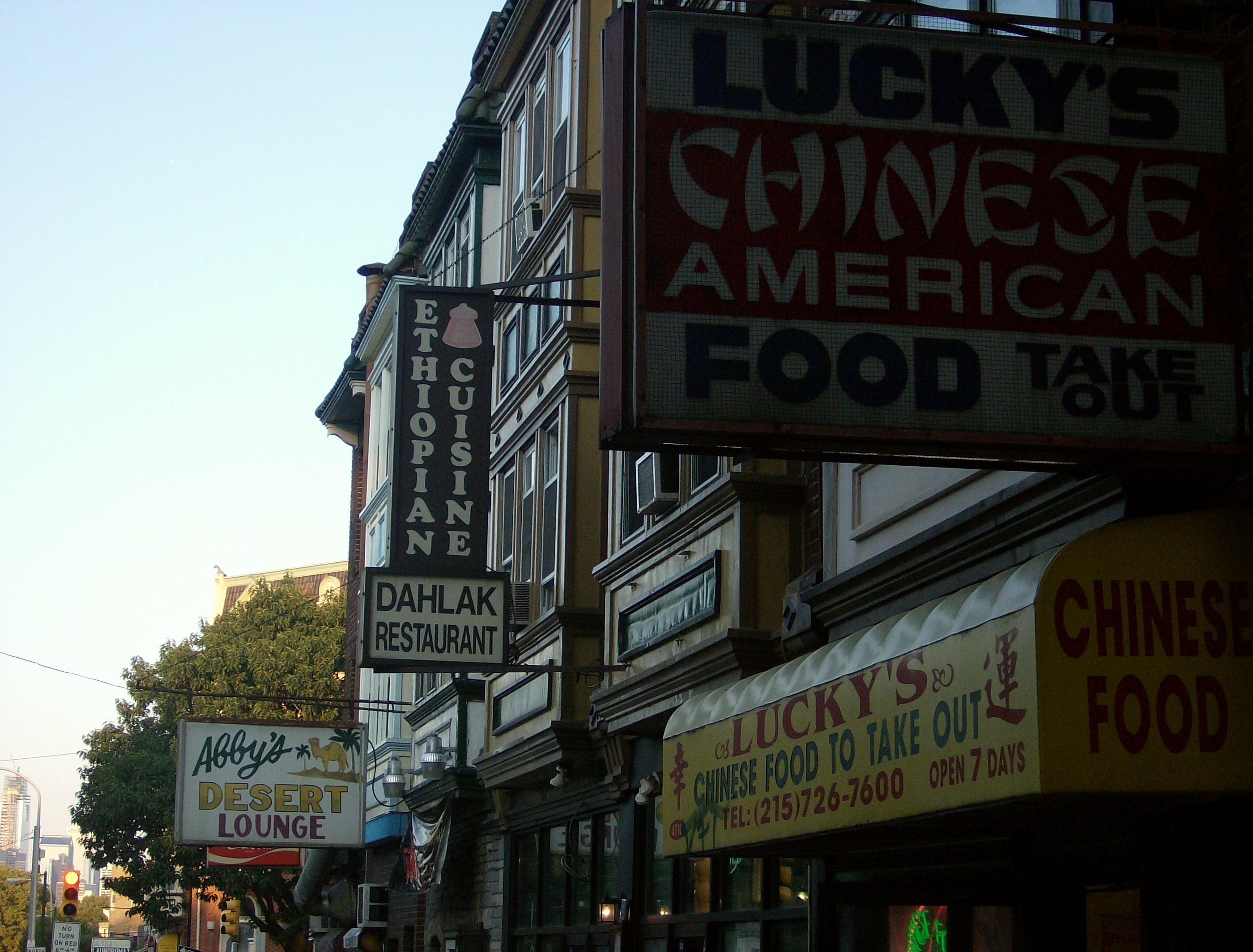
47th Street and Baltimore Ave

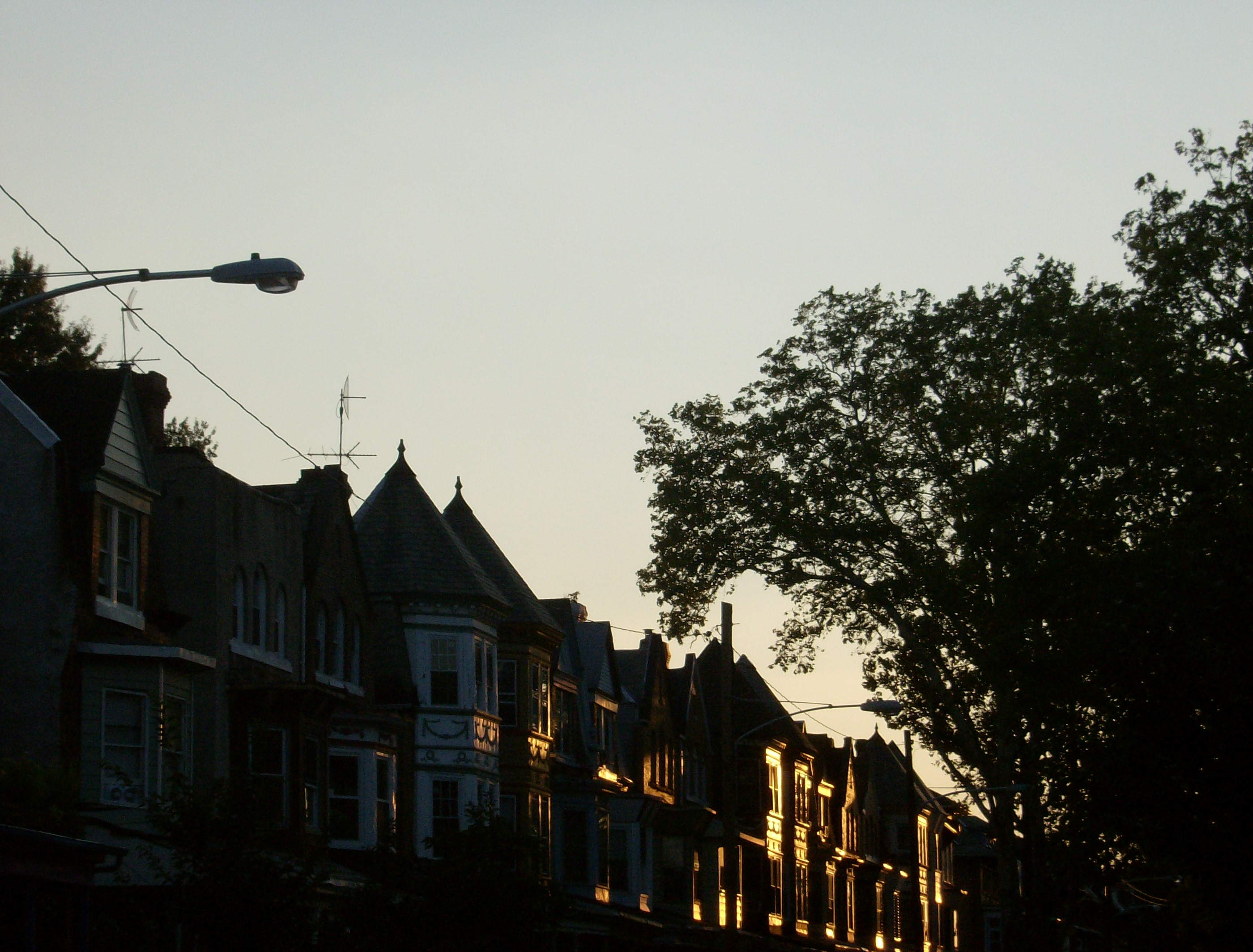
Queen Anne-style rooftops

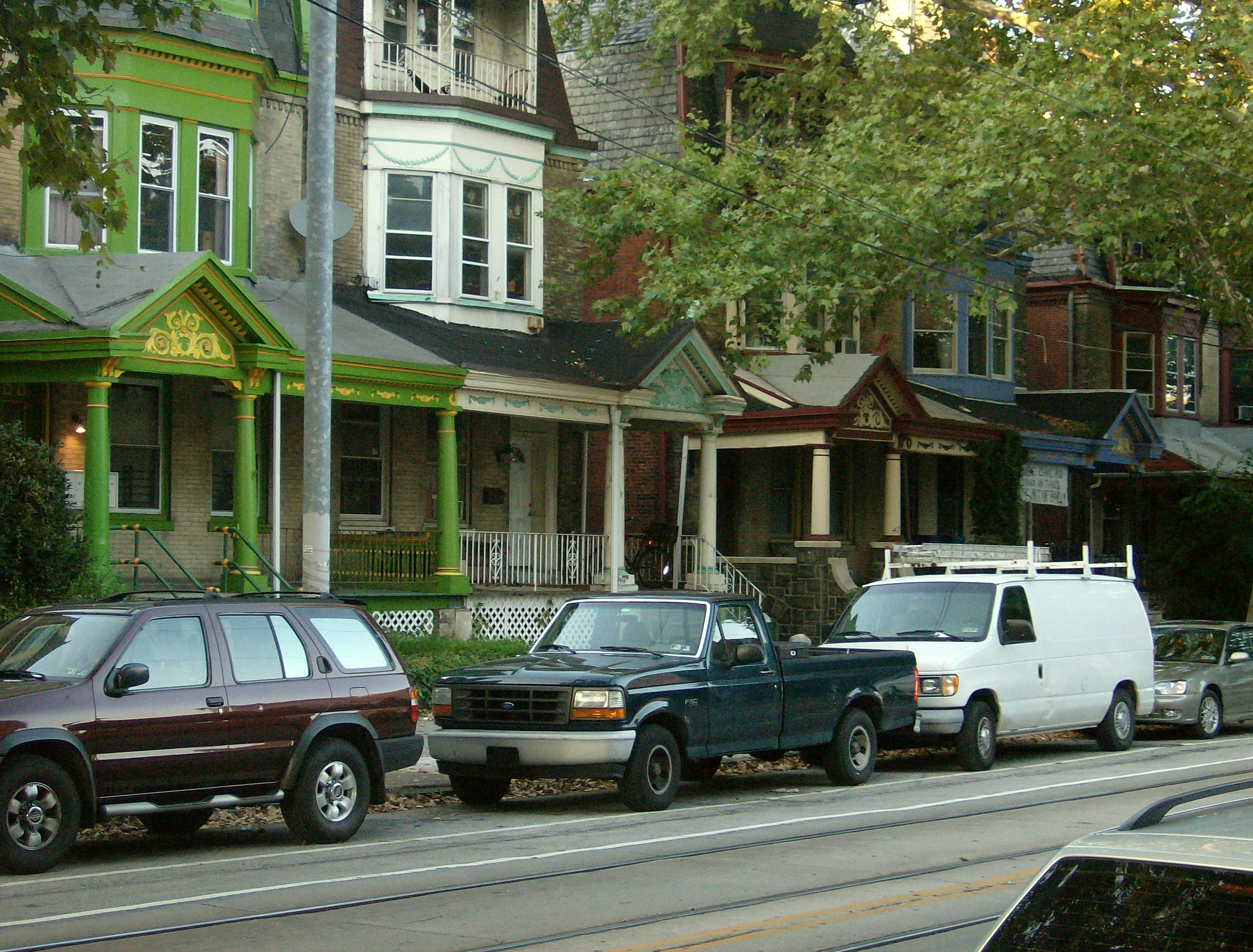
Houses on Baltimore Ave

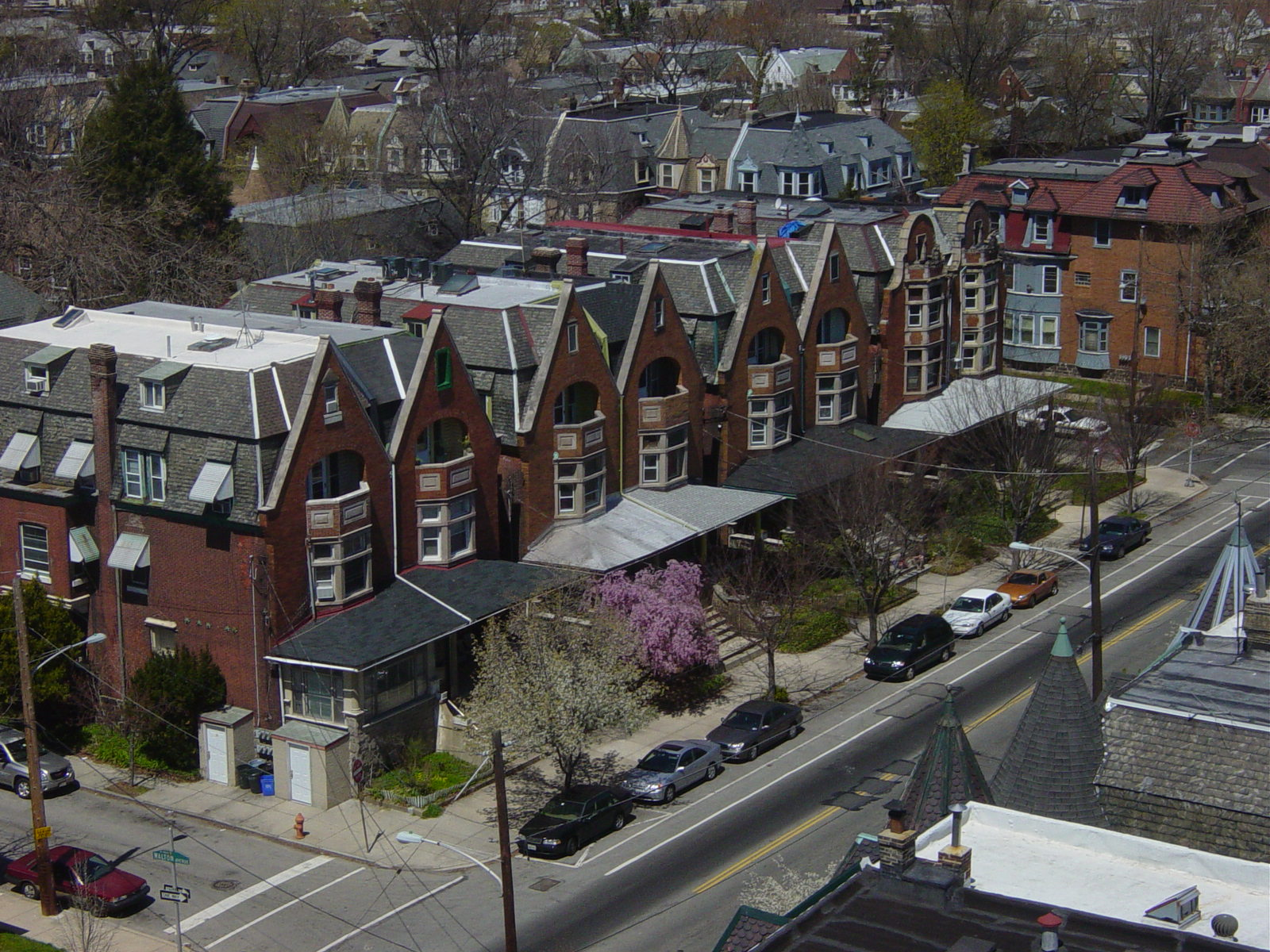
Rowhouses on 48th Street between Cedar and Walton Streets

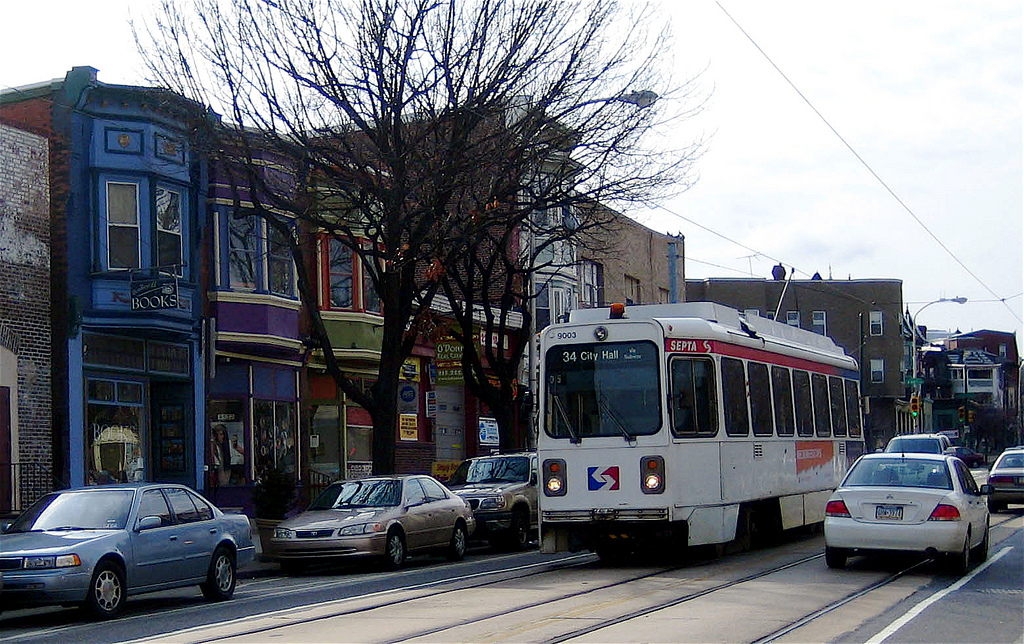
SEPTA'S Route 34 trolley in the 4500 block of Baltimore Avenue

== See also ==
- St. Francis de Sales Church
