= Michael Crane (writer) =

Australian poet (born 1961)

Michael Crane is an Australian poet, writer and compere of poetry events in Melbourne.

Born in Brisbane in 1961, crane moved to Melbourne at age 18. He has been an active member of Melbourne's poetry scene, performing in many open poetry readings from 1989 to 1991. In 1991, Crane organised the first Poetry Slam to be held in Australia and has organised and run more than 150 since.

== Publication ==
Crane's work has been published in literary journals and magazines, and he self-published three chapbooks between 1991 and 1994, including The Book of Screams, An Almost Summer and Joan of Arc was a fire eater. Ten of Crane's poems appeared in the collection Loose Kangaroos in 1998. Crane's first collection of poetry, The Lightmaster, was published in 1999 by Phoebe Press. He released Not Mad Just Raving, a CD of spoken word with musical accompaniment. In 2003, Ninderry Press released A Dog Called Yesterday – Selected Poems and Prose. In 2007, Picaro Press published Crane's chapbook of poetry entitled Poems from the 29th Floor. This was released at the 2007 Melbourne Writers Festival. Since 2001, Crane has written 200 micro stories called Postcards from the End of the World, many of which have appeared in the literary magazine Gangway. He has also written a yet-to-be-published detective novel. In 2024, Flying Island Books published a book of his poems entitled "Urban & Landscape / Ordinary Lives".

== Poetry Idol ==
Since 2007, Crane has organised and compered the poetry competition Poetry Idol, with the final held each year at the Age Melbourne Writers Festival. Poets from Poetry Idol are published in the Paradise Anthology, an annual magazine of song lyrics and poems.

== Other projects ==
Crane has been interviewed on Radio National, appeared on the PoeticA Program, and has been a featured poet on the ABC's program Voices. He also performs musical poems with singer/songwriter Trish Anderson, and the two toured regional high schools in Victoria in 2010.
