= St. Francis de Sales Roman Catholic Church (Philadelphia) =

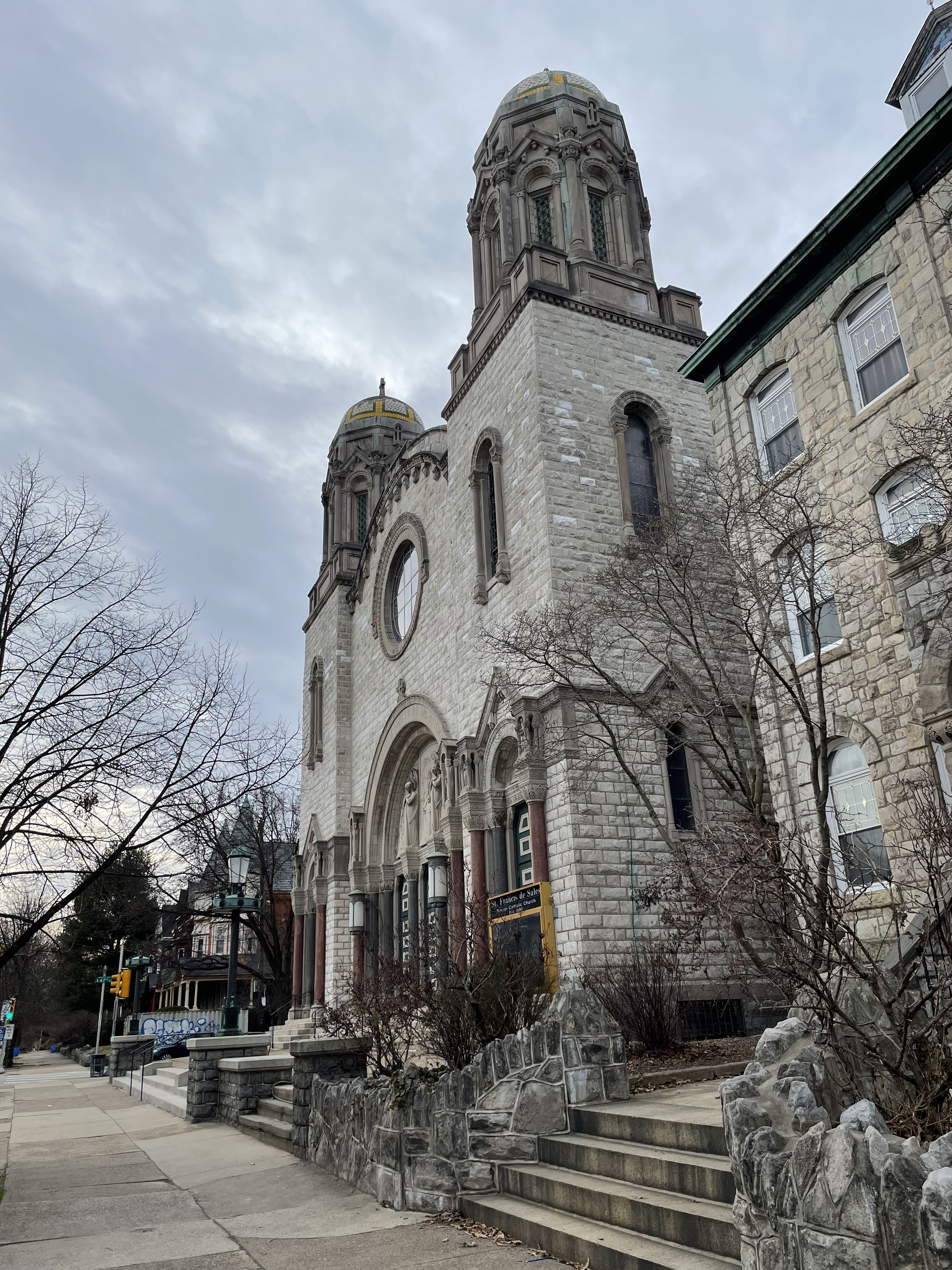
- St. Francis de Sales Roman Catholic Church
- 39.9469°N 75.2156°W
- Location: Philadelphia, Pennsylvania
- Denomination: Roman Catholic Church
- Website: desalesphilly.com

Architecture
- Architect: Henry D. Dagit
- Style: Byzantine Revival style
- Groundbreaking: 1907

St. Francis de Sales Roman Catholic Church, founded in 1890, is a Catholic church at 4625 Springfield Avenue in Philadelphia, Pennsylvania, part of the Roman Catholic Archdiocese of Philadelphia. Its cornerstone laid in 1907, the Guastavino tiled dome of the de Sales parish has been an icon in its neighborhood. The de Sales parish was designed by Philadelphia architect Henry D. Dagit, built in the Byzantine Revival style and incorporates a Guastavino tile dome modeled on that of Istanbul's Hagia Sophia and elements of the Arts and Crafts movement which was at its peak when the church was built.

== Congregation ==
de Sales shield

The parish was created to serve the needs of the immigrant Irish community prevalent at the time. The parish has seen its congregation change over the years from the working-class Irish immigrant families – who eventually left for the suburbs - to the Vietnamese refugee families who have settled in the neighborhood. The parish currently serves a large African immigrant community, an African American constituency, and the faculty, staff and students of the University of Pennsylvania, Drexel University, and the University of the Sciences. The parish is known for its choir, elementary school, and church organ.

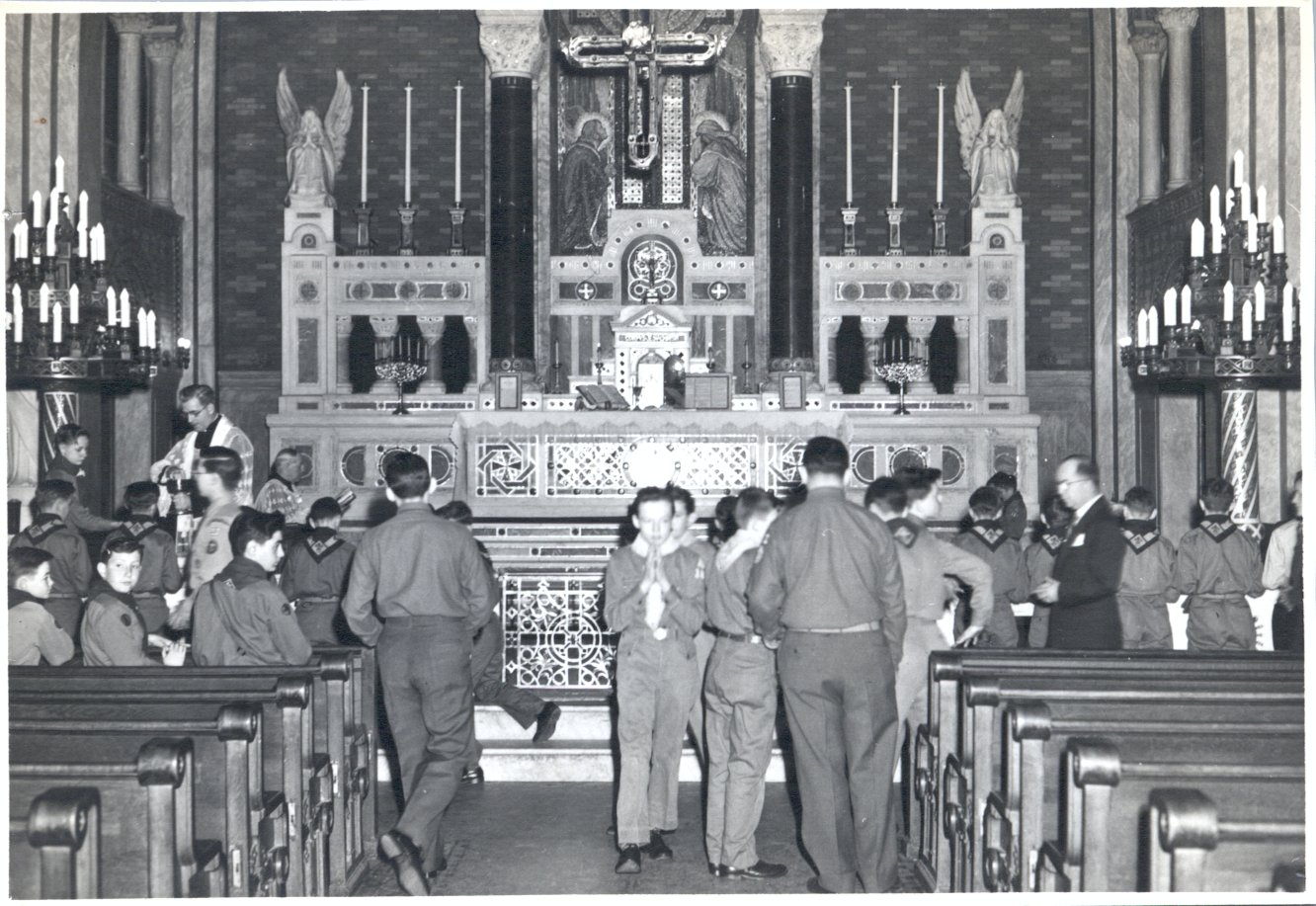
Church in 1949

== Architecture ==
It is one of the best examples of French organ in the United States.

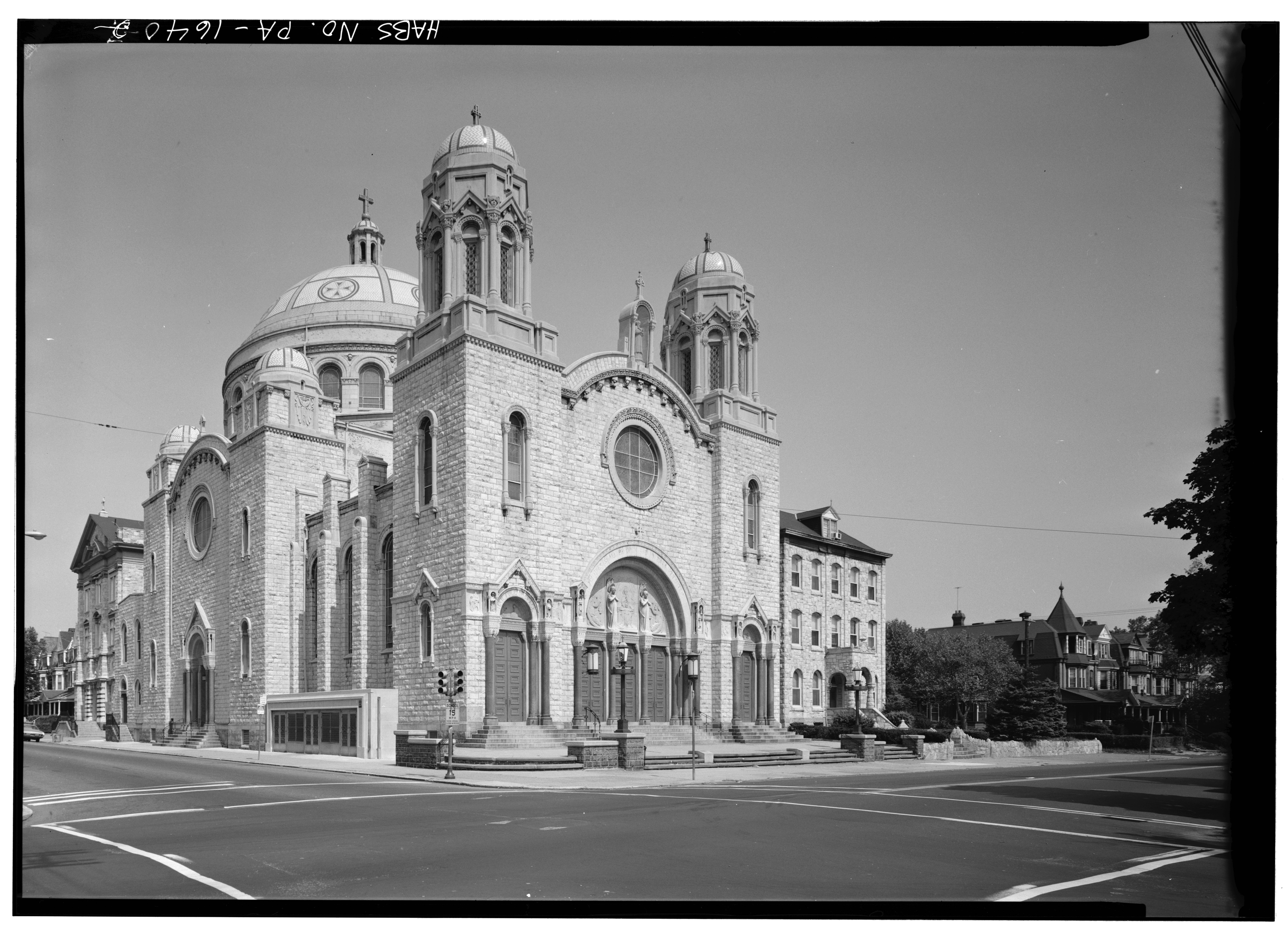
Church as seen from Springfield Avenue

The Guastavino dome has leaked for the entire life of the church. All of the tiles on the entire dome were replaced in the 1950s by then-pastor Bishop Joseph McShea in an unsuccessful attempt to stop the leaking. It was suggested that the parish go with copper sheathing, but the bishop was reluctant to make such a drastic change. Partners for Sacred Places, a Philadelphia-area interfaith group that works to support the preservation of churches and other houses of worship, is currently working with the parish to restore the dome, the stained-glass windows, and the doors. Exterior restoration, other repairs and preventive maintenance are ongoing.

St. Francis de Sales is architecturally and culturally so beloved ... the congregation is serving the community in so many wonderful ways, and they have done so much for immigrants.

The interior was designed by Charles Theodore Biswanger (1879–1944), who was employed by the Dagit architectural firm. The tile arch system, designed by the Raphael Guastavino Co. in 1911, is one of the best examples of the company's work in Philadelphia.

In 1968, as a result of liturgical changes made by the Second Vatican Council, the church hired the architects Robert Venturi and John Rauch to renovate the altar space to create a free standing altar. The alterations that Venturi and Rauch added included a new altar, a celebrant's chair, a suspended cathode light and the elevation of the sanctuary floor. These renovations were entirely modern, clashing with the Byzantine architecture of the interior. The renovations were removed almost immediately at the request of the parishioners, who reacted negatively to the renovations.

== Schools ==
The congregation contains a K-8 school. Its peak enrollment was in 1953, with 1,378 students. Historically the Servants of the Immaculate Heart of Mary (IHM) provided the teaching force, with the first group arriving in 1904. The students were historically predominantly Irish American but other ethnic groups came later. Historically the students were low income. It is one of the designated schools of St. Agatha – St. James Church.

== Organ ==
The organ in the choir-loft has four manuals, eighty-five ranks, 166 stops, many of which are prepared for (not built or installed yet), and 4,947 pipes, making it one of the largest church organs in the Philadelphia Metropolitan Area. The Philadelphia Orchestra has used this organ for recordings, including Symphony No. 3 (Saint-Saëns). The organ was built in 1911 by the C.S. Haskell Pipe Organ Manufacturing Company.

== Notable parishioners ==
- Peter Boyle
- Joseph A. Pepe, Bishop of Las Vegas
- Jim Whelan, Democratic politician from New Jersey, state senator, ex-mayor of Atlantic City, New Jersey
- Dominic Irrera, professional stand-up comic and actor
- Michael Joseph Crane, American prelate of the Roman Catholic Church
- Joseph Mark McShea, American prelate of the Roman Catholic Church

== See also ==
- Archdiocese of Philadelphia
- Cedar Park
- Spruce Hill
