= Wild & Woolley =

Former Australian small publisher

Wild & Woolley is an Australian small book publisher founded by Pat Woolley and Michael Wilding in 1973.

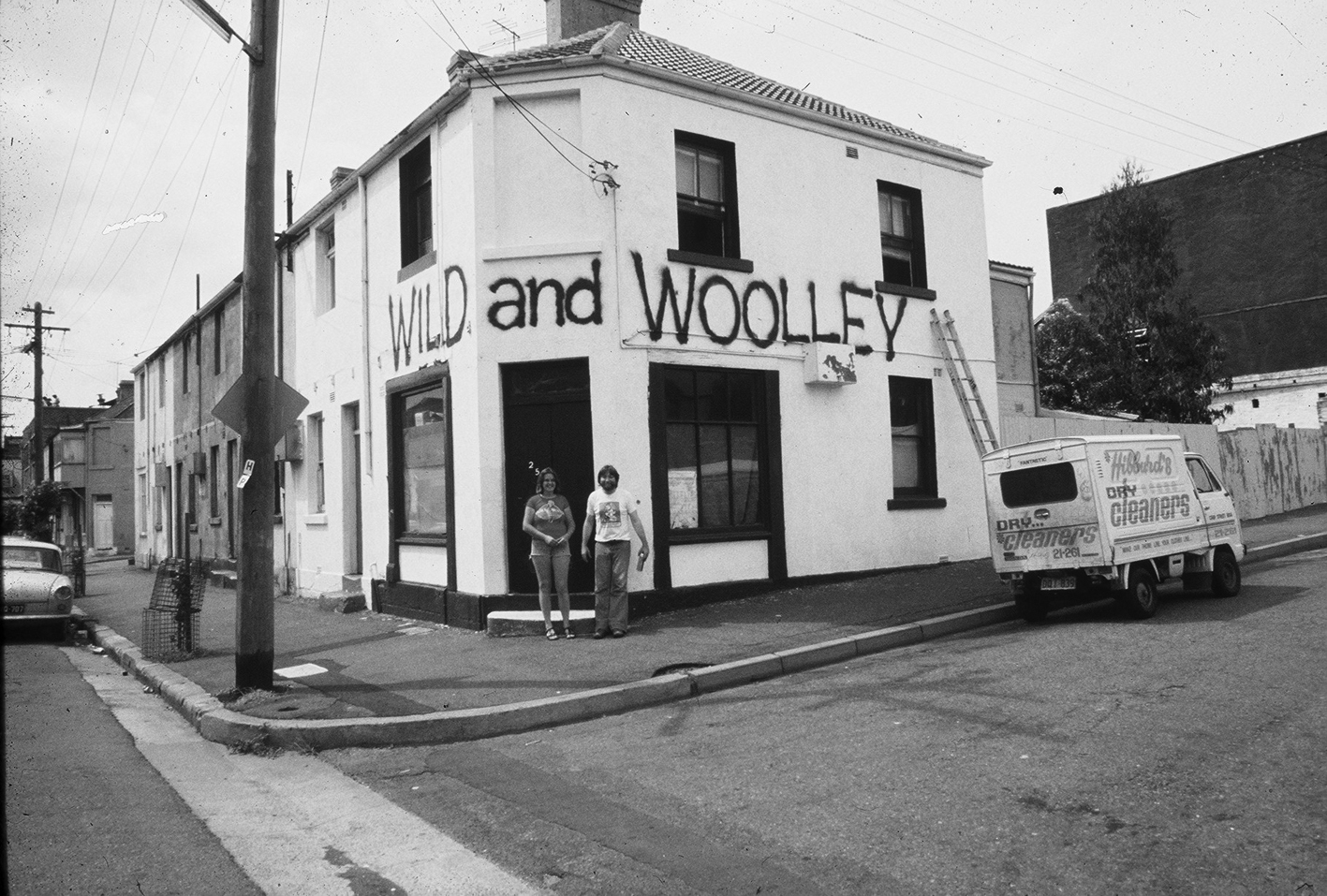
Ron and his wife Robyn Love in front of the Chippendale building

Woolley bought a corner tenement in Chippendale, Sydney, in 1975 for $23,000.

Starting in 1973 with the iconoclastic All About Grass on marijuana smoking, Wild & Woolley became immersed in Sydney's literary and bohemian culture of the 1970s. They published more than 70 books by authors including Charles Bukowski, Dennis Altman, Robert Adamson, Vicki Viidikas, Kris Hemensley, Michael Wilding, Katherine Susannah Pritchard, Lee Cataldi, Antigone Kefala, Stephen Knight, Rudi Krausmann, Jack Lindsay, Jon Silkin, Fred Cress, Laurie Duggan, Pam Brown, David Foster, Billy Jones, Ayshe Talay-Ongan, Glenn A Baker, Claire Dan, Rudi Krausmann, Dal Stivens, Tim Anderson, Albie Thoms, Bruce Petty, Joshua Tickell, Faith Bandler and many others.

As well as books, Wild & Woolley published several popular volumes of underground comix from Ron Cobb and others, in 1975, 1977 and 1981.

Wilding resigned as director in 1979.

The press grew considerably through the 1970s and 1980s, and became the Australian agent for American small publishers Black Sparrow Press, City Lights Bookstore and New Directions Publishing.

In 1991 Woolley established Fast Books, which focused on short run book production catering to self-published quality paperbacks.

In 2011, Wild & Woolley and its associated trademarked entity Fast Books were incorporated into Aveekee Pty Ltd, which was run by Pat Woolley with help from Ted Roberts, to produce new audio formats for the international audience. All of the companies ceased to operate after 2017.
