= Geoffrey Gates =

Australian writer

Geoffrey Gates is an Australian author and educatorbest known for his book A Ticket for Perpetual Locomotion, a novel about a young man named Carlos who disappears after reading the work of fictitious Mexican writer Eduardo Maranda. Short, episodic chapters follow the adventures of three 'Perpetual Locomotors' and Maranda, the author of their troubles. The novel uses a multiple narrative and frequent flashbacks and has elements of magic realism, mystery and travel genre. It was published by Interactive Press in 2005 with the support of the Australia Council and won the 2005 IP Picks Award for Best Fiction. A Sydney Morning Herald reviewer said the book was "nothing if not ambitious" but "too heavy to keep the reader moving."

In May 2015, Geoffrey's second novel, The Copyart Murders, was published by Glass House Books, an imprint of Interactive Publications. The book has been described by Irish poet Terry McDonagh in a review published on the IP Website: "Geoffrey Gates has a beautiful writing style employing prose and dialogue to convey facts and information while, at the same time, holding our attention as the story thunders along. The reader is never ahead of the action. My only reason for reading some sentences more than once was to admire the distinctive style and mastery of language everywhere in evidence." . Prior to its publication, the manuscript was given an honourable mention in the NSW LitLink Residential Fellowships & Unpublished Manuscript Award 2014..

Short stories by Gates have appeared in such academic journals as Verandah, Dotlit, Gangway, UQ Vanguard, LINQ and Southerly.

Gates works as an educator, serving as the Director of Learning and Teaching at The Hills Grammar School.
