= Flying Island Books =

Australian poetry publisher

Flying Island Books is a not-for-profit poetry publisher in New South Wales best known for its Flying Islands Pocket Poet Series. Founded by Kit Kelen in 2010, it was established in Macau and Markwell, NSW near Bulahdelah, and incorporated in NSW in 2021. A 2024 review considered that "Flying Islands Pocket Books is home to a delightful selection of poetry— books that can be kept in a pocket or bag to be read on a train, plane, or a doctor’s waiting room." In 2025, 100 poets featured in the series were collected in an anthology. The society runs online poetry workshops and a biannual manuscript competition.
