= Gangway (gay bar) =

Defunct gay bar in San Francisco, California, U.S.

- Interactive map of Gangway
- Address: 841 Larkin Street; San Francisco; United States
- Location: California
- Coordinates: 37.78612593032846°N 122.41834481717156°W

Construction
- Opened: 1910
- Closed: 2018

Gangway was San Francisco's oldest continuously operating gay bar, opened in 1910 and started catering to a gay clientele by 1960. It closed in 2018.
