= Antigone Kefala =

Greek-Australian poet (1935–2022)

- Born: 28 May 1931; Brăila, Romania
- Died: 3 December 2022 (aged 91); Sydney, New South Wales, Australia
- Occupation: Poet
- Writing career
- Notable awards: 2022 Patrick White Award

Antigone Kefala (28 May 1931 – 3 December 2022) was an Australian poet and prose-writer of Greek-Romanian heritage. She was a member of the Literature Board of the Australia Council and is acknowledged as being an important voice in capturing the migrant experience in contemporary Australia. In 2017, Kefala was awarded the State Library of Queensland Poetry Collection Judith Wright Calanthe Award at the Queensland Literary Awards for her collection of poems entitled Fragments.

== Life ==
Born in Brăila, Romania in 1931, Kefala and family moved to Greece and then New Zealand after World War II. Having studied French Literature at Victoria University and obtained a MA, she relocated to Sydney, Australia in 1960. There she taught English as a second language and worked as a university and arts administrator. Her poetry and prose is written in both Greek and English, with Absence: New and Selected Poems reissued in a second edition in 1998.

Her work, written in free verse, has been described as having an almost metaphysical detachment. It is characterised by an austere allusiveness unusual in Australian poetry. Aside from Greek and English it has been translated into Czech and French.

In 2009, Antigone Kefala: A Writer’s Journey, an anthology of reviews, essays and analytical writing of Kefala's works edited by Professor Vrasidas Karalis and Helen Nickas was published by Owl Publishing. In 2021, a collection of essays on her prose and poetry titled Antigone Kefala: New Australian Modernities, edited by Elizabeth McMahon and Brigitta Olubas, was published by UWA Publishing.

In November 2022, Kefala won the Patrick White Award. A week later, she died on 3 December 2022, at the age of 91.

== Bibliography ==
=== Poetry ===
Collections

- The Alien (Makar Press, 1973)
- Thirsty Weather (Outback, 1978)
- European Notebook (Hale & Iremonger, 1988)
- Absence: New and selected poems (Sydney, Hale & Iremonger, 1992, 2nd ed. 1998)
- Poems: A selection (Melbourne, Owl Publishing, 2000)
- Wayfarers and Other Poems (Picaro Press, 2010)
- Fragments, Artarmon, N.S.W. Giramondo, 2016, ISBN 978-1-925336-19-1
- Journeys (Owl Publishing, 2019)
- Poetry (Giramondo Publishing, 2025)

=== Prose fiction ===
- The First Journey (Wild & Woolley, 1975)
- Alexia : A Tale of Two Cultures (John Ferguson, 1984)
- The Island (Hale & Iremonger, 1984)
- Sunday Morning in The Oxford book of Australian Short Stories selected by Michael Wilding (Melbourne, Oxford University Press: 1994)
- Summer Visit: Three Novellas (Giramondo Publishing, 2003)
- Sydney Journals (Giramondo Publishing: 2008) ISBN 978-1-920882-41-9
- Max: The Confessions of a Cat (Owl Publishing, 2009)

=== Selected critical studies and reviews of Kefala's work ===
Sydney journals

- Allen, Delia (Autumn 2009). "Narratives of exile". Overland. 194: 88.

== Awards and recognition ==
- 2017 Queensland Literary Awards – State Library of Queensland Poetry Collection – Judith Wright Calanthe Award for Fragments
- 2022 Patrick White Award – winner
