= Świdnica Polska =

- Village
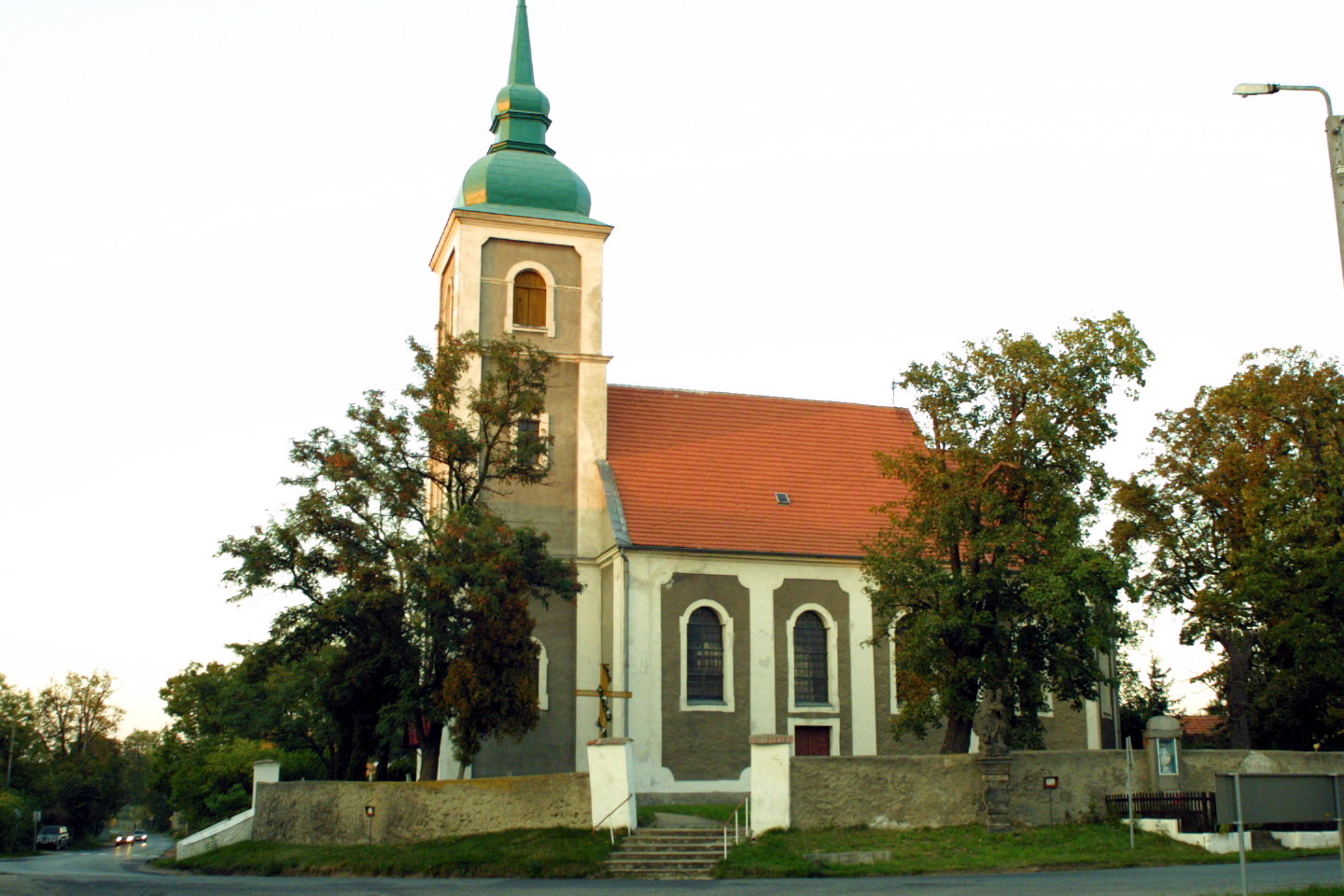

- Location within Poland
- Coordinates: 51°5′N 16°40′E
- Country: Poland
- Voivodeship: Lower Silesian
- County: Środa
- Gmina: Kostomłoty

Świdnica Polska [ɕfidˈnit͡sa ˈpɔlska] is a village in the administrative district of Gmina Kostomłoty, within Środa County, Lower Silesian Voivodeship, in south-western Poland.
