= Geoffrey Eggleston =

Australian poet

Geoffrey Eggleston (15 January 1944 – 2 December 2008), more usually known as "Geoff", was an Australian poet, prominent in the performance poetry scene. He was the original organizer of the Montsalvat Poetry Festival at the Montsalvat artists' colony in Eltham, Victoria. He and Paul Smith edited the Whole Earth Sun-Moon Review which started in 1973, and appeared three times a year. The notes in the National Library of Australia catalogue describe the periodical as: "Poetry fiction ecology reviews articles cooking mysticism society humour theatre much much more".

The Geoffrey Eggleston Manuscript Collection is housed in the Australian Special Research Collection of the University College Library at Australian Defence Force Academy.
