= Pi O =

Greek-Australian poet (born 1951)

П. O.
- Born: 1951 (age 74–75); Katerini, Macedonia, Greece
- Occupation: Poet
- Writing career
- Notable awards: 2024 Patrick White Award winner

П. O. (or Pi O, born 1951) is a Greek-Australian, working class, anarchist poet.

== Biography ==
Born in Katerini, Greece, in 1951, П. O.'s family moved to Australia around 1955. They settled in Fitzroy after several months in a Bonegilla migrant camp.

П. O. was inspired to start writing poetry in 1973 when he heard Johnny Cash reciting (religious) poetry while tuning his guitar. П. O. thought he could do as well or better. His work ranges from standup-type rants to 'conceptual' page poetry and concrete poetry, with a heavy emphasis on wordplay and capturing the vitality of everyday speech. Thematically, he commonly portrays the issues of non-Anglo-Celtic working class life.

П. O. won the 2020 Judith Wright Calanthe Prize for Poetry for Heide at the Queensland Premier's Literary Awards. He is a finalist for the 2021 Melbourne Prize for Literature. In 2024 he won the Patrick White Literary Award.

== Bibliography ==
=== Poetry collections ===
- Fitzroy Brothel: Poems, Strawberry Press (1974)
- Shade, Khasmick Press (1974)
- Drunk and the 'Steve' Poems [1975]
- Emotions in Concrete, Flying Duck Enterprises (1975)
- Street Singe (1976)
- л. 0. Revisited, Wild & Woolley (1976) ISBN 0-909331-23-5
- Humble, Bird in the Hand (1977)
- Panash, Collective Effort (1978)
- Missing Form: Concrete, visual and experimental poems with Peter Murphy and Alex Selenitsch (Collective Effort, 1981)
- The Fuck Poems, Collective Effort (1982)
- Fitzroy Poems, Collective Effort (1989)
- 24 Hrs: The day the language stood still, Collective Effort (1996) ISBN 0-646-26903-8
- The Number Poems and Other Equations, Collective Effort (2000)
- Big Mumbers : New and Selected Poems, Collective Effort (2008) ISBN 978-0-9587726-6-2
- Fitzroy: The Biography, Collective Effort (2015)
- Heide, Giramondo Publishing (2019) ISBN 978-1925818208
- The Tour, Giramondo Publishing (2023) ISBN 978-1922725769

=== Edited ===
- Off the Record, Penguin (1985)
- The Essential Mann, Collective Effort Press (1993)

=== Selected critical studies and reviews of O's work ===
Big numbers : new and selected poems

- Leves, Kerry (Autumn 2009). "Caught in the melee we look for signals : new poetry". Overland. 194: 89–92.

== See also ==
- Anarchism in Australia
