= Mike Markart =

Austrian writer, including playwright (born 1961)

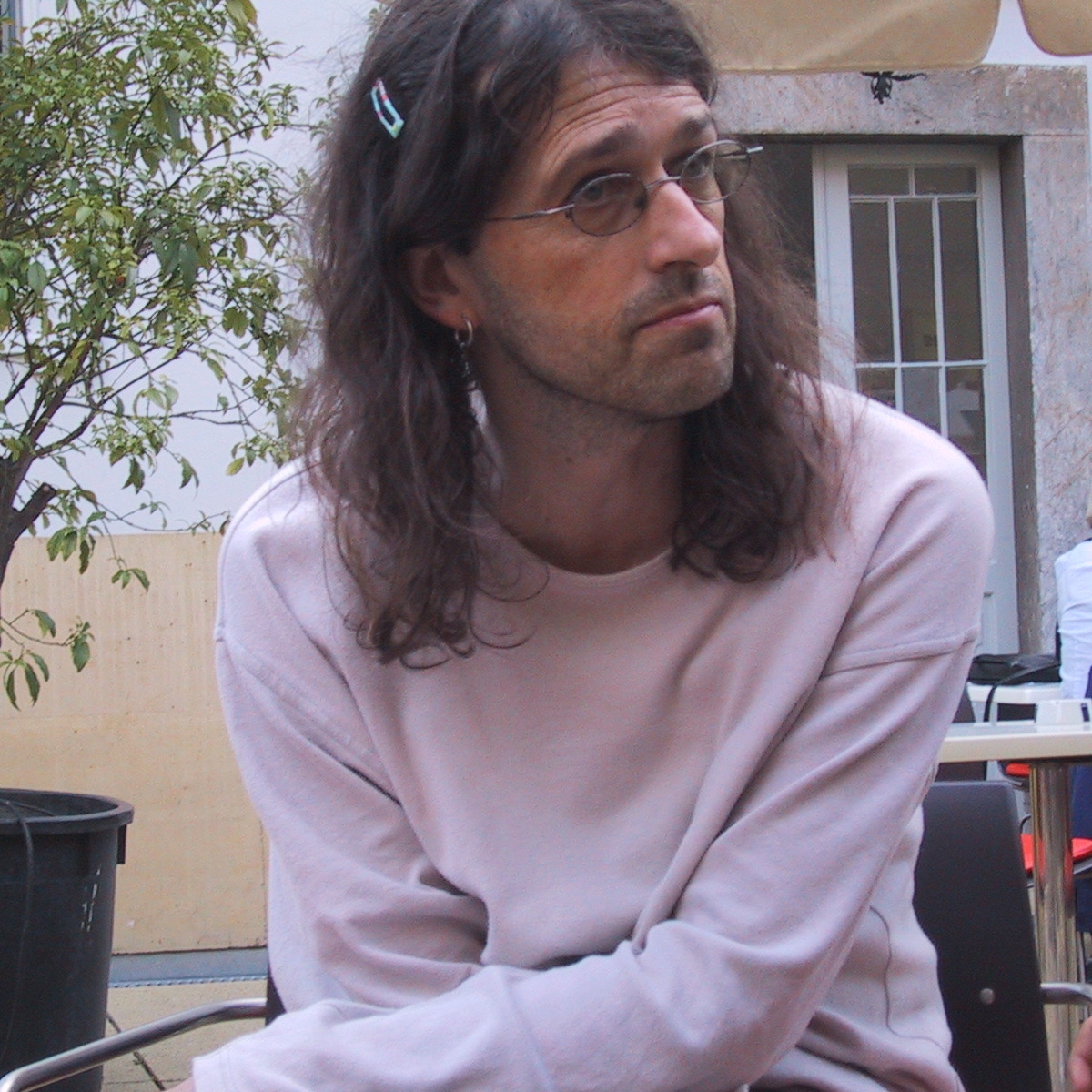
Mike Markart at the Literaturhaus Graz, Austria (2004)

Mike Markart (born 25 August 1961) is an Austrian writer, including and playwright.

He was awarded the Würth Literaturpreis in 2001 for his radio drama Magritte.

== Plays ==
(selection)

- Die Täter (2002)
- Kalcher (2003)
- Boulevard-Komödie (2003)

== Radio dramas ==
(selection)

- Magritte (2000)
- Ich weiss nicht wer ich bin ... (2002)
- Der dunkle Bellaviri (2005)

== See also ==
- List of Austrian writers
- List of playwrights
