= SubtleTea =

SubtleTea is a Pittsburgh-based online journal. It includes artist interviews, poetry, prose, visual art, links and resources. Founded by its editor David Herrle in 2002, the site has participants from California, South Africa, New York, India, Georgia and Ireland.

A new edition goes online every four months.
