= Michael Joseph Crane =

American prelate (1863–1928)

His Excellency, The Most Reverend Michael Joseph Crane
- Auxiliary Bishop of Philadelphia

Orders
- Ordination: June 15, 1889 by Patrick John Ryan
- Consecration: September 19, 1921 by Dennis Joseph Dougherty

Personal details
- Born: September 8, 1863 Ashland, Pennsylvania, US
- Died: December 26, 1928 Philadelphia, Pennsylvania, US
- Education: Catholic University of America
- Motto: Ut sim fidelis (That I may be faithful)

Bold

Styles of Michael Joseph Crane
- Reference style: The Most Reverend
- Spoken style: Your Excellency
- Religious style: Monsignor
- Posthumous style: none

Michael Joseph Crane (September 8, 1863 – December 26, 1928) was an American prelate of the Roman Catholic Church in the United States. He served as auxiliary bishop of the Archdiocese of Philadelphia in Pennsylvania from 1921 until his death in 1928.

== Biography ==
=== Early life ===
Michael Crane was born on September 8, 1863, in Ashland, Pennsylvania. He studied at St. Charles Borromeo Seminary in Philadelphia. He continued his studies at the Catholic University of America in Washington, D.C., where he earned a Bachelor of Sacred Theology degree in 1890.

=== Priesthood ===
Crane was ordained to the priesthood for the Archdiocese of Philadelphia by Archbishop Patrick John Ryan on June 15, 1889.

He served as a curate at a parish in Reading and later at St. Malachy Church in Philadelphia. In 1903, he became rector of St. Francis de Sales Church, also in Philadelphia. The Vatican name Crane as a papal chamberlain in 1914. Archbishop Dennis Joseph Dougherty appointed him as vicar general of the archdiocese in 1920.

=== Auxiliary Bishop of Philadelphia ===
On August 20, 1921, Crane was appointed auxiliary bishop of Philadelphia and titular bishop of Curium by Pope Benedict XV. He received his episcopal consecration on September 19, 1921, from Cardinal Dennis Joseph Dougherty, with Bishops John Joseph McCort and Thomas Walsh serving as co-consecrators. As an auxiliary bishop, he continued to serve as pastor of St. Francis de Sales Parish in Philadelphia.

=== Death ===
Crane died from pneumonia on December 26, 1928, in Philadelphia at the rectory of St. Francis de Sales, at age 65.

Catholic Church titles
Preceded by –	Auxiliary Bishop of Philadelphia; 1921–1928	Succeeded by –
