= Ania Walwicz =

Australian poet and artist (1951–2020)

- Born: 19 May 1951; Świdnica, Poland
- Died: 29 September 2020 (aged 69)
- Occupations: Artist, poet

Ania Walwicz (19 May 1951 – 29 September 2020) was an Australian poet, playwright, prose writer and visual artist.

== Early life ==
Walwicz was born on 19 May 1951 in Swidnica, Poland where she spent her childhood, before migrating to Australia in 1963. She attended the Victorian College of the Arts (VCA) in Melbourne.

== Style and influences ==
Walwicz was very sensitive to the treatment of performance artists which operate outside the normal practices. Her writing tends toward an impressionistic, stream of consciousness exploration of inner states. It also exploits 'appropriative' or 'sampling' techniques of production. Apart from publication in numerous anthologies, journals and several books, her work has been performed by La Mama Theatre, the Sydney Chamber Choir and set to music by ChamberMade. Walwicz performed her work in France, Japan and Switzerland. Until her death in September 2020 she taught creative writing at RMIT in Melbourne.

A fellow performance artist, John Cage, is known for creating interesting pieces of music that stretch the traditional limits and practices of musicians. The unconventionality of his work, once considered controversial, led people to reject his pieces. John Cage told a story about how professional orchestras destroyed his instruments because they refused to play his work. This story was very influential on Walwicz, as it demonstrated the intolerance of people who should not be intolerant to artists.

In Walwicz's one-woman play Telltale, the writer uses the influence and experience of her childhood to convey her work. “The play is populated with a lifetime of characters, some of whom have survived those early days when Walwicz did invent stories in the once- upon-a-time world of her childhood. "In a way there's millions The person begins in a chaotic state and winds up in one of grace."

Several cultural influences impacted Walwicz throughout her life. She was a strong believer in feminism and this is evident in her work. For example, she chose to rewrite the story of "Little Red Riding Hood" from a feminist viewpoint. Walwicz was also "inspired by writers like Franz Kafka and Fyodor Dostoevsky, her written work is featured in over 200 anthologies and in secondary and tertiary literary curricula and sound recordings of her works feature in Voiceprints."

As a nonconformist, Walwicz was once was critical of a beloved author and received backlash; the underlying message she received was 'you will believe what others believe'. This was very influential on her overall attitude towards authority and orthodoxy. This attitude helped Walwicz transcend the boundaries that many in the artistic community would try to place upon her.

Ultimately, Walwicz believed in the beauty found in creation. In particular, she believed in the power of writing. "A person once said to me that the act of writing is the ultimate act of hope. That you have this empty page and you can do something with it. So that's a beautiful thought. We can always start again."

== Importance of sound ==
As a performance artist, Walwicz understood the importance of sound in poetry. "It starts as writing and is writing first and foremost. Fundamentally, it has to be in writing because sound productions can be dismissed. The act of writing, for me, is an aural event. The processes of thinking and reading are aural. Other people have read my work in a different way. The problem with my public reading of my work is that people think that’s the way it has to be read. But its open to interpretation."

== Horse ==
In discussing her final work, Horse, Walwicz described how she drew her inspiration from a dream. "I didn’t know how Horse would end up or what would happen, but I knew that there was something remarkable happening, that was sort of almost guided by an outside power. But you know I found ideas which are supposed to be also generated within Freud’s writing, of the Kabbalistic thought which has always interested me: the sort of magic of language, that language can multiply itself and form secret and unusual patterns, while everything is put away in the drawer, and things of this nature. But I think because I was going into the fairytale territory, and the fairytale area is an area of magic." Horse won the 2017 Alfred Deakin Medal.

== Poetry readings ==
In addition to creating poetry, Walwicz was also a performance artist, often recording many of her original works. Many of her recordings are available online, including selections from her award-winning poetry.

- Hammer
- Horse
- Poetry and Performance Class
- Little Red Riding Hood

== Critical and scholarly response ==
In a piece, 'Transgressing Language', Lyn McCredden writes: "This impulse to return to origins, to childhood and new beginnings, is a recurrent one in Walwicz's work. Language is the possibility of renewal, of writing the self. It may be a treacherous or dangerous womb, but it is in its dangerousness, its sharpness, that it rewards the experimental poet who, through repetition, insistence, flights of lyrical affirmation and childlike simplicity, incants the new self. Questions of control are thematised, as the poet struggles with language for the desired effect, the new languaged self. But it can also be argued that poet and language seem to be coming from the same angle, in a relationship of concurrence, confronting the more conventional." "A number of contradictions shape the poetry of Polish-Australian writer Ania Walwicz. These contradictions are bred partly by the literary theory which has so insistently surrounded her work, and, it will be argued, are partly inherent in the enterprise of avant-garde or experimental poetry."

== Bibliography ==
- "Australia", poem in White, Damien; Couani, Anna (1981), Island in the sun 2 : an anthology of recent Australian prose, Sea Cruise Books, ISBN 978-0-908152-09-4
- Walwicz, Ania (1982), Writing, Rigmarole Books, ISBN 978-0-909229-20-7
- Walwicz, Ania (1989), Boat, Angus and Robertson, ISBN 978-0-207-16296-1
- Hammial, Philip; Walwicz, Ania (1989), Writing; Travel, Angus & Robertson, ISBN 978-0-207-16288-6
- Walwicz, Ania (1992), Red Roses, University of Queensland Press, ISBN 978-0-7022-2431-7
- Walwicz, Ania (2013), Elegant, Vagabond Press
- Walwicz, Ania (2014), Palace of Culture, Glebe NSW Puncher & Wattmann, ISBN 978-1-922186-50-8
- Walwicz, Ania (2018), Horse, University of Western Australia Press, ISBN 978-1-74258-989-3
