= Gerald Ganglbauer =

Austrian–Australian writer and publisher

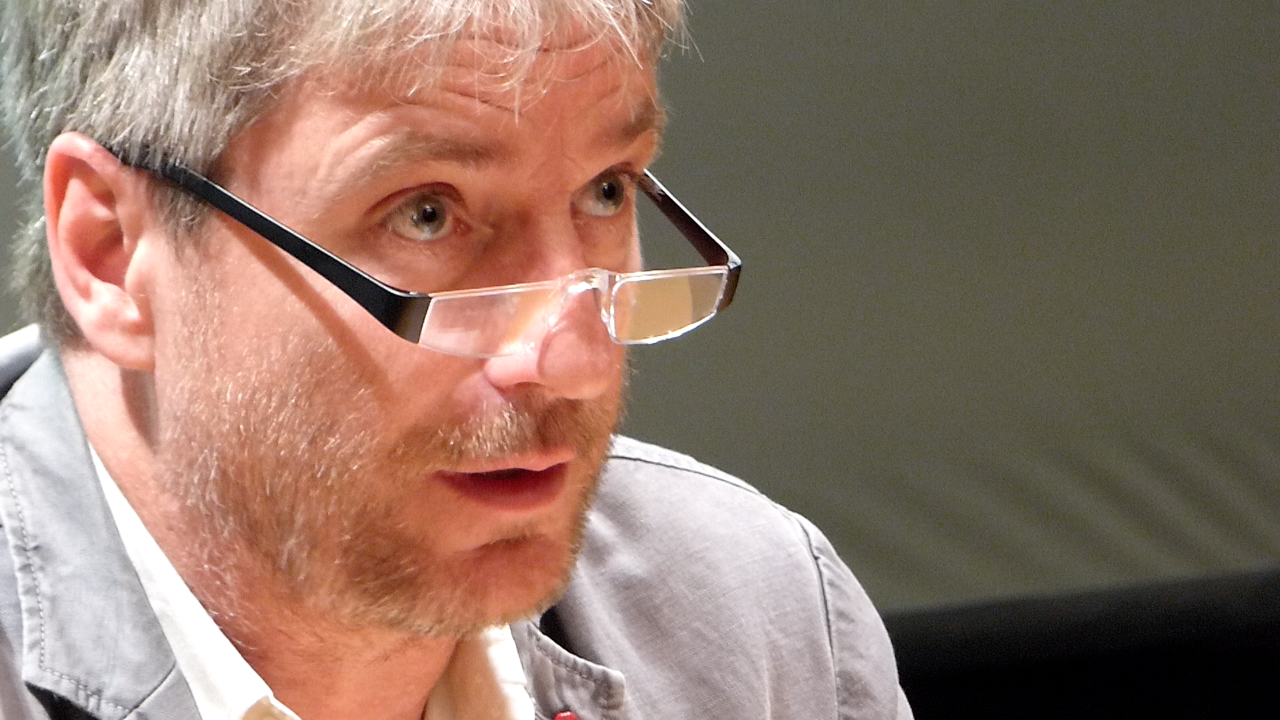
- Gerald Ganglbauer (2015)
- Born: 24 February 1958; Graz, Austria
- Occupations: Writer and publisher
- Known for: Parkinson's ambassador

Gerald Ganglbauer (born 24 February 1958 in Graz, Austria) is an Austrian–Australian writer and publisher diagnosed with Parkinson's disease at the age of 48 years. Since then he has been an ambassador for Parkinson's support groups.

== Life ==
Born Horst Gerald Ganglbauer, he studied communication at University of Graz (1986), and more recently web development at the SIT (2006). In 1984 he started the independent press Gangan with his then wife Petra Ganglbauer. After their divorce he lived for several years in Vienna. Since 1989 he has lived in Sydney and Perth, Australia under dual citizenship, and is listed as one of Styria's Top Expatriates.

1982/83 he was a founder and editor-in-chief of the magazine perspektive, 1987/88 editor in chief of the literary journal gangan viertel, ZeitSCHRIFT über Literatur, and in 1990/91 he launched Gangaroo in Sydney. In 1992 he co-edited with Andreas Puff-Trojan Textwechsel, and in 1996 launched the international online magazine Gangway. In 2001 he introduced Gangart Awards, an intercultural competition for the arts on the net, which were awarded till 2005 by an international jury, and only ended due to his illness. Gangan published books in print for ten years, and then online.

In the last decade he was involved in resident action groups and was elected chairman of the Ultimo Precinct Committee in Sydney. He is founder of the forum for Austrians Abroad (2004) and since 2007 has been on the board of directors of the World Federation of Austrians Abroad (AÖWB). He was also convenor of Free Beach Action NSW, a lobby group for naturism in New South Wales.

== Illness ==
Gerald Ganglbauer's PON (Parkinsonline, the friendly support group)

In 2006 he was diagnosed with early onset Parkinson's disease, which forced him into retirement in 2007, before the age of 50. With this dramatic change in his life, he became active in Parkinson's support groups in Austria (Parkinson Selbsthilfe Steiermark) and New South Wales (Parkinson's NSW Inc.) and, despite his illness was re-elected AÖWB director in 2010. Together with Viennese neurologist Dr Wilibald Gerschlager he started the Austrian Parkinson's forum Parkinsonberatung and ran it from June 2007 to January 2011, and, after that, a Facebook page and a Twitter microblog for the umbrella organisation Parkinson Selbsthilfe Österreich. On Skype he introduced Parkinsonline IM groups in August 2010. In Sydney he convened an inner city support group, moved back to Austria in 2013, and became first elected president of Austrian Parkinson's association PON, in 2014. He is also a contributing author to Dr Gerschlager's book on Parkinson's disease.

== Publications ==
=== English-language publications ===
- Evading the jaws of giants, Independent publishing in Austria. Editions Review, Sydney and Melbourne 1990.
- Multicultural Publishing: How hard is it to do in Australia? Carnivale Literary Festival, Sydney 2001.
- Publishing My Way. National Young Writers Festival, Newcastle 2002.
- Cyberspace (Die Verbundenheit der Differenz: Kommunikation ohne Grenzen). TUAC, Vienna 2003.
- Virtual Communities (Virtuelle Gemeinschaften). IRICS, Vienna 2005.
- World ID – no place is home anymore. "V" Identities, Bregenz 2011.
- Parkinsong Duets. CD, ATS Records, Molln 2019.

=== German-language publications ===
- Stop-Over (Ich bin eine Reise). Die Rampe XVIII.2, Linz 1992.
- Halbe Österreicher. ROTWEISSROT, Vienna 1996.
- Der ganz langsame Abstieg. In: Willibald Gerschlager: Parkinson. Ursachen, Diagnose, Verlauf und Therapieoptionen. Maudrich, Vienna 2009.
- Ich bin eine Reise. Eine autobiografische Montage über Leben, Liebe, Leidenschaft – und Parkinson. Gangan, Stattegg-Ursprung 2014.
- Einunddreißig. Ein Mann, 30 Frauen, Parkinson-Medikamente und eine Liebesgeschichte. Gangan, Stattegg-Ursprung 2015.
- Geografie der Liebe. Stationen, Begegnungen, Transit Zonen, Life and Times: die Generation der Baby-Boomer. Gangan, Stattegg-Ursprung 2016.
- Korrespondenzen auf Papier. Gangan, Stattegg-Ursprung 2018.
- Die Österreicher im Ausland. Gangan, Stattegg-Ursprung 2019.
- Kopfbahnhof. Gangan, Stattegg-Ursprung 2020.
