= Kris Hemensley =

English-Australian poet

Kris Alan Hemensley (born 26 April 1946) is an English-Australian poet who has published around 20 collections of poetry. Through the late 1960s and '70s he was involved in poetry workshops at La Mama, and edited the literary magazines Our Glass, The Ear in a Wheatfield, and others. The Ear played an important role in providing a place where poets writing outside what was then the mainstream (such as Jennifer Maiden) could publish their work. In 1969 and 1970 he presented the program Kris Hemensley's Melbourne on ABC Radio. In the 1970s he was poetry editor for Meanjin

The son of an Egyptian mother and an English father who was stationed in Egypt with the Royal Air Force, Hemensley was born on the Isle of Wight, and spent his early childhood in Alexandria. He visited Australia at the age of 18, and emigrated there in 1966. He was awarded the Christopher Brennan Award in 2005, which recognizes poetry of "sustained quality and distinction".

Hemensley managed Collected Works, a specialist poetry bookshop in Melbourne, Australia, until it closed down in late 2018.

== Poetry collections ==
- ——; Taylor, Ken (1968). Two Poets.
- —— (1969). The Going and Other Poems. Heidelberg West: Michael Dugan.
- —— (1971). Dreams. London: Edible Magazine.
- —— (1972). The Soft Poems: For Timothy. Bexleyheath: Prison Clothes/Joe DiMaggio Press.
- —— (1973). Rocky Mountains and Tired Indians. Bexleyheath: Joe DiMaggio Press.
- —— (1974). Love's Voyages. St Lucia: Makar Press.
- —— (1974). Domestications: A Selection of Poems 1968–1972. Melbourne: Sun Books.
- —— (1975). Sulking in the Seventies. Clifton Hill: Ragman Productions.
- —— (1975). The Poem of the Clear Eye. Carlton: Paper Castle.
- —— (1978). Beginning Again: Poems 1976. Sydney: Sea Cruise Books.
- —— (1978). The Moths. Carlton: Paper Castle.
- —— (1979). The Miro Poems. Alverstoke: Stingy Artist.
- —— (1979). A Mile from Poetry. Sydney: Island Press.
- —— (1984). Trace. Port Melbourne: Ingles St Press.
- —— (1987). Sit(e). Weymouth: Stingy Artist/Last Straw.
- —— (2016). Your Scratch Entourage. Victoria: Cordite Publishing Inc.
