= Vicki Viidikas =

Australian poet and writer

- Born: 25 September 1948; Sydney, Australia
- Died: 27 November 1998 (aged 50); Sydney Australia
- Occupation: Poet

Vicki Viidikas (25 September 1948 – 27 November 1998) was a twentieth-century Australian poet and prose writer.

Her first poem, At East Balmain, was published when she was 19 years old. Her poetry, fiction and drawings were published in literary magazines, as well as several collections of poetry. She wrote prolifically up until her untimely death at 50 years old, which was much mourned in Australia's poetry community.

Viidikas was an iconic member of the collection of Sydney poets now known as the “generation of ‘68”. The ‘counter culture’ and her travels in Asia, especially India, are recurrent subjects in her poetry.

== Early life ==
Viidikas was born and grew up in Sydney, Australia. Her mother, Betty Kunig, was Anglo-Australian, her father Estonian. She had a sister, Ingrid Lisners, who has been involved with publishing the collection New and Rediscovered in tribute to her sister. Viidikas attended schools in Queensland and Sydney, until the age of 15 when she left education and her home.

After leaving home, she held various jobs, including veterinary assistant, typist, bartender, apple packer, bookshop assistant, and research assistant, before starting to write at 16 without any formal training.

== Career ==
Alternative literary magazines began publishing Viidikas' poetry and fiction in the late 1960s and early 1970s. Her writing discussed the drug and sexual revolution taking place. She joined the Balmain New South Wales poetry scene in the late 1960s, she encountered, among others, Ken Bolton, John Forbes, Martin Johnston and John Tranter. Michael Wilding's recollections of her can be found in his 'Wild and Woolley: a publishing memoir' (Giramondo, 2011) and 'Growing Wild' (Arcadia, 2016).

Viidikas' work was influenced by her travels, including trips to Europe and the Middle East. She lived in India for over a decade in the 1970s and 1980s, with her experiences informing the collection India Ink published in 1984.

Viidikas was interviewed in 1975 by Hazel de Berg about her life and career. The recording of this can be at the National Library of Australia.

== Personal life ==
During the late 1960s, Viidikas was briefly married to artist Robert (Bob) Finlayson. Whilst living in King's Cross and then Balmain, they both became involved with the Poetry Society of Australia.

== Works ==
Poetry

- Condition Red. (University of Queensland, 1973) ISBN 0-7022-0884-1
- Knabel. (Sydney: Wild & Woolley, 1978) ISBN 0-909331-56-1
- India Ink: A collection of prose poems written in India. (Sydney: Hale & Iremonger, 1984) ISBN 0-86806-093-3

Short stories

- Wrappings. (Sydney : Wild & Woolley, 1974) ISBN 0-909331-00-6

Collected editions

- New and Rediscovered. (Transit Lounge, 2010) ISBN 9780980571769

Viidikas' novel Kali and the Dung Beetle has not been published.

== Influence ==
In 1975, Stephen Wallace directed a short film, Break Up, from the short story ‘Getting it all Together’ published in Wrappings.

== Awards ==
- Australia Council Grants, Awards and Fellowships, Literature Board Grants, 1980
- Australia Council Grants, Awards and Fellowships, Literature Board Fellowship, 1978
- Australia Council Grants, Awards and Fellowships, Literature Board Fellowship, 1975
- Australia Council Grants, Awards and Fellowships, Literature Board Grants, Young Writers' Grant, 197
