= Michael Wilding (writer) =

British-born writer and academic

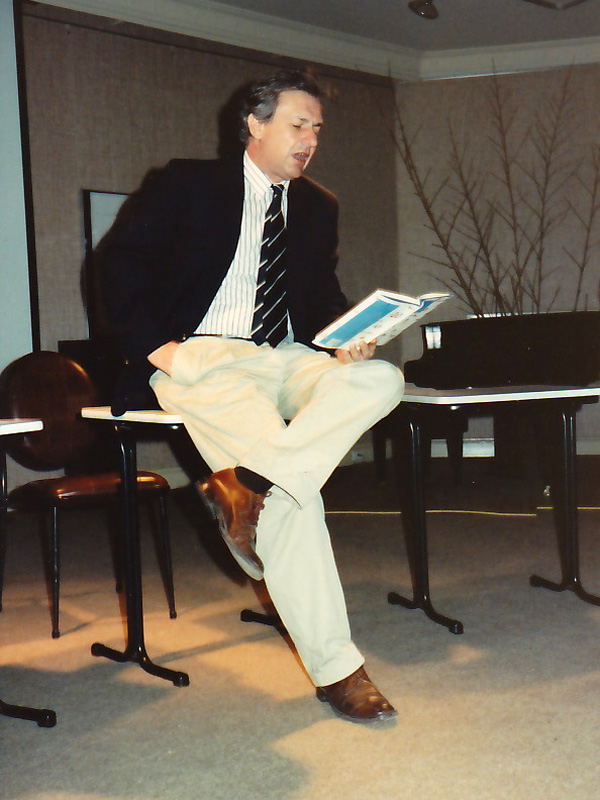
Gangan Verlag book launch at the Goethe-Institut Sydney (1991)

Michael Wilding (born 1942) is a British-born writer and academic who has spent most of his career at the University of Sydney, where he has been an emeritus professor in English and Australian literature since 2002.

== Early life and education ==
Michael Wilding was born in 1942 in Worcester, England, and read English at Oxford University, where he graduated in 1963 with BA with first-class honours.

== Academic career ==
Wilding took up an appointment as assistant lecturer at the University of Sydney in 1963, where he stayed for three years. He returned to England in 1967, earned his M.A., and took up a lectureship at the University of Birmingham.

In 1969, he became a senior lecturer at the University of Sydney and was promoted to Reader in English from 1973 to 1992. He was awarded a Doctor of Letters (D.Litt.) by the University of Sydney in 1993. That same year, he was appointed Professor of English and Australian Literature, a role he held until his retirement in 2000, after which he was named professor emeritus.

His scholarly work focused especially on 17th-century and early 18th-century English literature, such as the works of John Milton, and Australian literature such as the works of Marcus Clarke, William Lane, and Christina Stead.

== Writing career ==
He was a creative writer associated with the "new writing" movement, whose members played a significant role in revitalizing Australian literature. His work was later described as "exciting and innovative" by Ross Fitzgerald in The Australian.

He has published many novels and short story collections, and has had his stories published widely in anthologies. His most widely referenced work is the short story magazine Tabloid Story, which he co-founded with Frank Moorhouse and Carmel Kelly in 1972. The magazine ran until 1974, with 33 issues total.

== Publishing ==
Wilding was a founding editor of the University of Queensland Press's Asian & Pacific Writing series, which ran from 1972 to 1982. He was also a co-founder of the publishers Wild & Woolley, with Pat Woolley.

== Literary studies ==
- Milton's Paradise Lost (Sydney U.P. 1969)
- Marvell: Modern Judgements, ed (Macmillan, 1969; Aurora, 1970)
- The Radical Reader, ed with Stephen Knight (Wild & Woolley, 1977)
- Political Fictions (Routledge, 1980, 2024)
- Dragons Teeth: Literature in the English Revolution (Clarendon Press, Oxford U.P., 1987)
- The Oxford Book of Australian Short Stories, ed (Oxford U.P. 1995).
- Cultural Policy in Great Britain, with Michael Green & Richard Hoggart (Unesco, 1970)
- Social Visions (Sydney Studies, 1993)
- The Radical Tradition: Lawson, Furphy, Stead (James Cook University, 1993)
- Studies in Classic Australian Fiction (Sydney Studies, 1997)
- Raising Spirits, Making Gold, and Swapping Wives: The True Adventures of Dr John Dee and Sir Edward Kelly, Shoestring Press, Nottingham; Abbott Bentley, Sydney, 1999
- Cyril Hopkins’ Marcus Clarke, ed with Laurie Hergenhan & Ken Stewart (Australian Scholarly, 2009)
- Wild & Woolley, a Publishing Memoir (Giramondo, 2011)
- Wild Bleak Bohemia: Marcus Clarke, Adam Lindsay Gordon and Henry Kendall, a Documentary (Australian Scholarly, 2014)
- Growing Wild (Arcadia, 2016)
- Wild About Books (Australian Scholarly, 2019)
- Marcus Clarke, Novelist, Journalist and Bohemian (Australian Scholarly, 2021)
- Colonials, Expatriates, Moderns & Postmoderns: Essays in Australian Literature (Australian Scholarly, 2024)
- Revolution and Restoration: Milton, Dryden, Marvell, Butler (Sydney Studies, 2025)
- Essays in Modern Asian and Australian Literature, by Stephen Conlon, (ed with Mabel Lee) (Sydney Studies, 2025).
- The True Adventures of Dr John Dee and Sir Edward Kelly (Cambridge Scholars, 2026).

== Fiction ==
- Aspects of the Dying Process (University of Queensland Press, 1972)
- Living Together (UQP, 1974)
- The West Midland Underground (UQP, 1975)
- Scenic Drive (Wild & Woolley, 1976)
- The Phallic Forest (Wild & Woolley and John McIndoe, N.Z., 1978)
- Pacific Highway (Hale & Iremonger, 1982)
- Reading the Signs (Hale & Iremonger, 1984)
- The Paraguayan Experiment (Penguin, 1985)
- Under Saturn (Black Swan, 1988)
- This is for You (Angus & Robertson, 1994)
- Book of the Reading (Paperbark Press, 1994)
- Somewhere New: New and Selected Stories (Central Queensland U.P., 1996)
- Wildest Dreams (University of Queensland Press, 1998)
- Academia Nuts (Wild & Woolley, 2002, 2003)
- Wild Amazement (Central Queensland U.P. and Shoestring Press U.K., 2006)
- National Treasure (Central Queensland U.P. 2007)
- Superfluous Men (Arcadia, 2009)
- The Prisoner of Mount Warning (Arcadia, 2010)
- The Magic of It (Arcadia, 2011)
- Asian Dawn (Arcadia, 2013)
- In the Valley of the Weed (Arcadia, 2016)
- Little Demon (Arcadia, 2018), The Travel Writer (Arcadia, 2018)
- The Midlands and Leaving Them (Shoestring, 2021)
- Find Me My Enemies and Cover Story (Arcadia, 2023).
- Point Danger (Arcadia, 2026)

== Short story collections and anthologies ==
- The Short Story Embassy (Wild & Woolley, 1975)
- The Man of Slow Feeling: Selected Short Stories (Penguin, 1985)
- Great Climate (Faber, 1990)
- Her Most Bizarre Sexual Experience (W.W. Norton, 1991)

== Reception ==
A critical study of his work, Michael Wilding and the Fiction of Instant Experience by Don Graham, was published in 2013.
