= Jas H. Duke =

Jas Heriot Duke (16 October 1939 – 19 June 1992) was a cult figure in the Australian performance poetry scene. He worked much of his life in Melbourne Board of Works and began writing poetry in 1966. He was influenced by Dada, surrealism and experimental movements. He writes "I started performing poems as a timid person with a stutter but the spirit of the times soon converted me into a bellowing bull."

During the 1960s he travelled to the UK and Europe and participated in the underground publishing and filmmaking scenes in Brighton and London. Returning to Australia in 1972 he worked as a draughtsman and continued publishing and performing, writing a novel about his travels entitled Destiny Wood.

Duke's writings included translations of French and Eastern European Modernist poets but he is best remembered for his sound poems. Nicholas Zurbrugg describes his work as "the voice played like a human saxophone". His collected poems are published by Collective Effort press in Melbourne as Poems of War and Peace.

Duke died in Melbourne, Victoria on 19 June 1992.

== Bibliography ==
=== Poetry ===
- Poems of War and Peace (Collective Effort, 1989)
- Dada kampfen um leben und tod: A prose poem [Dada fight for life and death] (Wayzgoose, 1996)
- Alekhine und Junge in Prag German translation by Gabi Malotras (Gangway, 1996)

=== Novel ===
- Destiny Wood (1978)

=== Readings ===
- The Best of Jas H Duke (audio cassette, NMA Publications 1989)
