= David Watson (New Zealand musician) =

Musician from New Zealand, born 1960

David Watson (born 1960) is an American musician originally from New Zealand. Watson has lived and worked in New York City since 1987. Originally known as a guitarist, since 1991 Watson's work has also featured new music for the Highland Bagpipes.

Before moving to New York, while in New Zealand in the 1980s, Watson co-founded Braille Records to document the local experimental music scene. He organized national improvisation festivals (Off the Deep End, in 1984 and 1985) and in 2001 started the Artspace/alt.music festival to present new experimental music in Auckland.

Watson's work includes regular performances with MacArthur Award winner John Zorn; ongoing recording projects with Lee Ranaldo and Christian Marclay; a premier performance of a Robert Ashley work in New York; performances in Europe with rock-minimalism pioneer Rhys Chatham; a recording project with Jonathan Kane; performances with Zeena Parkins at Brooklyn Academy of Music and a score for Jeremy Nelson Dance.

Watson released his disc Throats - with vocalists Makigami Koichi and Shelley Hirsch - on Ecstatic Peace; and a double CD Fingering an Idea, on Phill Niblock's XI Records to critical acclaim. Together with Tony Buck and Ranaldo he formed the band Glacial. In 2010, Ranaldo released the solo album Maelstrom From Drift on Three Lobed Recordings with guest appearances of Tony Buck and David Watson. Glacial released On Jones Beach In 2012.

== Discography ==
- Reference (LP, Album), Braille Records 1986
- David Watson / Jim Denley / Rik Rue / Amanda Stewart / Ikue Mori - Bit-Part Actor (CD), Braille Records, 1996
- Skirl (CD), 1999
- David Watson with Shelley Hirsch and Makigami Koichi - Throats (CD, Album), Ecstatic Peace! 2007
- Fingering An Idea (2xCD, Album), XI Records, 2007
- Frode Gjerstad, Kevin Norton, David Watson - Tipples (CD, Album), FMR Records (2), 2011
- Glacial - On Jones Beach, LP Three Lobed Recordings, 2012
- TiPPLE (Frode Gjerstad, Kevin Norton, Watson), No Sugar On Anything (2013)
- TiPPLE, Live At Elastic Arts (2015)
- TiPPLE, Cartoon Heart (Relative Pitch Records, 2020)
