= Blanche Atkinson =

English novelist and children's author

Blanche Isabella Atkinson (bapt. 18 February 1847 – 27 November 1911) was an English novelist and author of children's books. She is also noted for her correspondence and friendship with the influential art critic John Ruskin.

== Life and works ==
Blanche Atkinson was born in Aigburth, Liverpool, one of 11 children of a prosperous Liverpool soap manufacturer, Jonathan Atkinson, and his wife, Louisa Spence.

An avid reader of Ruskin's Fors Clavigera letters to the workmen and labourers of Great Britain, Atkinson posted in March 1873 her first subscription, along with a note of appreciation of his work. At the time their correspondence began, Atkinson was 27 and Ruskin 54. During the first three years of their friendship, she received a hundred letters from Ruskin; forty others were written between the years 1876 and probably 1886. In 1873, she became a Companion in Ruskin's political group, the Guild of St George, which attempted to put some of his ideas into practice by setting up Utopian communities.

Ruskin printed in Fors extracts from some of her letters dealing with the squalor of slum life in industrial cities and the devastation of the countryside caused by industrialisation. Atkinson's interest in the social conditions of the poor led Ruskin to introduce her by letter to Octavia Hill.

After reading an article she had written for mill workers, Ruskin encouraged Atkinson to write a short story, so that he could assess it. She subsequently published three novels: The Web of Life, or the Story of Peter Holgate's Love (1889), They Have Their Reward (1890), and A Commonplace Girl (1895).

Her children's books include Rosalinda and Other Fairy Tales (with Anna Cross, 1890), The Real Princess (1894), Dick's Hero (1899), Tom Leslie's Secret and What Came of it (1900) and Jack's Baby (1904). Her non-fiction includes What Are the Duties of Selbornians? (1895) and Ruskin's Social Experiment at Barmouth (1900).

Atkinson was a close friend of the Irish feminist and social reformer Frances Power Cobbe (1822–1904), and edited two of her Cobbe's works, Life of Frances Power Cobbe as Told by Herself (1904) and The Duties of Women: A Course of Lectures by Frances Power Cobbe (1905). Cobbe bequeathed all the copyrights of her works to Atkinson in her will.

In the latter part of her life, Atkinson lived at Tynffynnon, the home of Mrs Fanny Talbot (1824–1917), a wealthy landowner who had donated land and cottages in Barmouth to John Ruskin's Guild of St. George.

Atkinson died in 1911 at Barmouth, Merionethshire. She never married.

== Bibliography ==
- 1895 - A Commonplace Girl
- 1900 - Ruskin's social experiment at Barmouth
- 1906 - Some short stories. First series
