= Julian Spalding =

British curator

Julian Spalding (born 15 June 1947 in Lewisham, south London) is an English art critic, writer, broadcaster and a former curator. Considered to be a controversial maverick and outspoken critic of the art world, he has frequently contributed to arts, news and current affairs programmes on radio and TV.

== Early life and education ==
Spalding grew up on a council estate in St Mary Cray, south London. His upbringing there played an important part in shaping his subsequent outlook, particularly with regard to understanding how social inequality and cultural deprivation have a negative impact on people's lives.

He studied art history at the University of Nottingham and art at Nottingham Art College, and after a brief spell as an artist and designer he chose to work in museums and galleries. Spalding started as an art assistant at museums in Leicester and Durham before becoming director of galleries for Sheffield, and then Manchester. In 1989 he was appointed director of Glasgow Museums, responsible for the largest collection managed by a local authority and Kelvingrove Art Gallery and Museum.

== Career ==
During his career as a curator he established several award-winning, innovative galleries and museum services, including the Ruskin Gallery in Sheffield; the St Mungo Museum of Religious Life and Art and The Gallery of Modern Art (GoMA) in Glasgow; and the Open Museum. In 2000, he also instigated the now international Campaign for Drawing.

In 1999, he was awarded the Lord Provost's Prize for Services to the Visual Arts in Glasgow for his directorship of Glasgow Art Galleries and Museums, although his curatorial career was cut short the same year when his post, along with others, was abolished by Glasgow City Council. Spalding subsequently spoke internationally and advised museums and galleries about new and innovative approaches, later outlined as what he describes as a practical philosophy in his 2002 book The Poetic Museum. He is also a Companion of the Guild of St George, and served as Master from 1996 to 2005.

Since 2001, he has concentrated chiefly on his writing, winning the Banister Fletcher Prize in 2006 for his book The Art of Wonder.

His latest book "Art Exposed" (Pallas Athene) 2023 is an account of his professional life and the many people he has met and has had dealings with, from David Hockney to the Queen, Henri-Cartier Bresson to Niki de St Phalle, Jack Jones to David Bowie.

In 2024 he wrote to the National Gallery (copy to the King) asking them to remove the cut-off date of 1900 they themselves imposed on their collection in 1996, without any public debate, and continue to bring their collection of great paintings slowly and magisterially up-to-date, as they had been doing since their foundation 200 years ago. The art of painting didn't die in 1900. It is still very much alive. As Dalya Alberge said in her article about his letters in the Guardian 'they are creating a terrible fossil'.

== Bibliography ==
- "Art Exposed" (Pallas Athene) 2023
- "Realisation - from Seeing to Understanding - the Origin of Art' (2015)
- "Summers of Discontent - the purpose of the arts today" by Raymond Tallis, with Julian Spalding (2014)
- Con Art: Why you ought to sell your Damien Hirsts while you can, [Amazon/Kindle] (2012)
- Nothing On, [Amazon/Kindle] (2012)
- The Best Art You've Never Seen: 101 Hidden Treasures from around the World, Rough Guides (2010) ISBN 978-1-84836-271-0
- The Art of Wonder : A History of Seeing, Prestel (2005) ISBN 3-7913-3150-7
- Contemplating the Reflection of the Moon in a Pool : Musing on museums of the future, Netherlands Museums Association, Amsterdam (2004)
- The Eclipse of Art: Tackling the Crisis in Art Today Prestel (2003) ISBN 3-7913-2881-6
- The Poetic Museum: Reviving Historic Collections, Prestel (2002) ISBN 3-7913-2678-3
- Gallery of Modern Art Glasgow: The First Years, Scala Books (1996) ISBN 1-85759-121-6
- Happy Days, Beryl Cook (Introduction), Victor Gollancz (1995) ISBN 0-575-06192-8
- Is There Life in Museums?, W H Smith Contemporary Papers (1990)
- Lowry: The Paintings and Drawings, The Herbert Press in association with the South Bank Board (1987)
- The Art of Watercolour Painting, Manchester City Art Galleries (1987)
- Modern Art in the Collections of Manchester City Art Galleries, Manchester City Art Galleries (1986)
- Three Little Books on Painting: 1. Light, Arts Council of Great Britain (1984) ISBN 978-0-7287-0373-5
- Three Little Books on Painting: 2. Movement, Arts Council of Great Britain (1984) ISBN 978-0-7287-0374-2
- Three Little Books on Painting: 3. Image, Arts Council of Great Britain (1984) ISBN 978-0-7287-0375-9
- George Fullard, Arts Council of Great Britain (1984)
- The Forgotten Fifties, Sheffield City Art Galleries (1984) ISBN 0-86321-015-5
- Francis Davison, Arts Council of Great (1983) ISBN 0-7287-0352-1
- Fragments Against Ruin: a Journey through Modern Art, Arts Council of Great Britain (1981) ISBN 978-0-7287-0278-3
- Lowry, Phaidon Press (1979) ISBN 0-7148-1996-4

=== Selected articles by Spalding ===
- "‘This was his revenge on art’: is Marcel Duchamp’s greatest work a fake?", The Guardian, Sunday 15 October 2023.
- "Arts supremo Spalding condemns Glasgow's cultural institutions", The Herald.
- ""We need to bridge the unhealthy divide between nationals and regionals", Museums Association.
- "Obituary: Nerys Johnson", The Guardian, Wednesday 4, July 2001
- "More central control is the last thing our museums need", The Independent, Wednesday, 24 October 2001
- "The death of the National Gallery" New Statesman, 8 April 2002
- "A broad brush. Beauty and skill are no longer relevant to the aesthetic debate" New Statesman, 29 September 2003
- "Taking a Fresh look at art", The Guardian, Thursday, 9 November 2006
