= Guild of St George =

Charitable education trust

- The Guild's logo
- Formation: 5 January 1871; 155 years ago
- Type: Charitable trust
- Registration no.: 231758
- Legal status: Charity
- Purpose: Advancement of education and training in the field of rural economy, industrial design and craftsmanship, and appreciation of the arts
- Headquarters: UK
- Members: 320
- Activities: Education; Events; Exhibitions; Research
- Collections: Ruskin Collection; Properties; Archives
- Master: Dr Rachel Dickinson
- Website: www.guildofstgeorge.org.uk

The Guild of St George is a charitable Education Trust, based in England but with a worldwide membership, which tries to uphold the values and put into practice the ideas of its founder, John Ruskin (1819–1900).

== History ==
Ruskin, a Victorian polymath, established the Guild in the 1870s. Founded as St George's Company in 1871, it adopted its current name and constitution in 1878. Ruskin, an art critic, had turned increasingly to social concerns from the 1850s. His critique of Victorian political economy, Unto This Last, was serialised in 1860, and published with an additional preface in book-form in 1862. In lectures, letters and other published writings, he denounced modern, industrial capitalism, and the theorists and politicians who served it. He considered that the ugliness, pollution and poverty it caused were undermining the nation. His conviction that human society and the natural environment had been corrupted and ruptured motivated him to seek practical means of redemption, reform and reconstruction.

Through the Guild, which married medieval (i.e. pre-industrial) values and a progressive belief in social improvement, Ruskin hoped to establish communities to challenge the profit-motive driving modern industry, and to provide alternatives to mass production. He drew inspiration from medieval craft guilds, and was influenced by his particular interest in the cultural history of Venice.

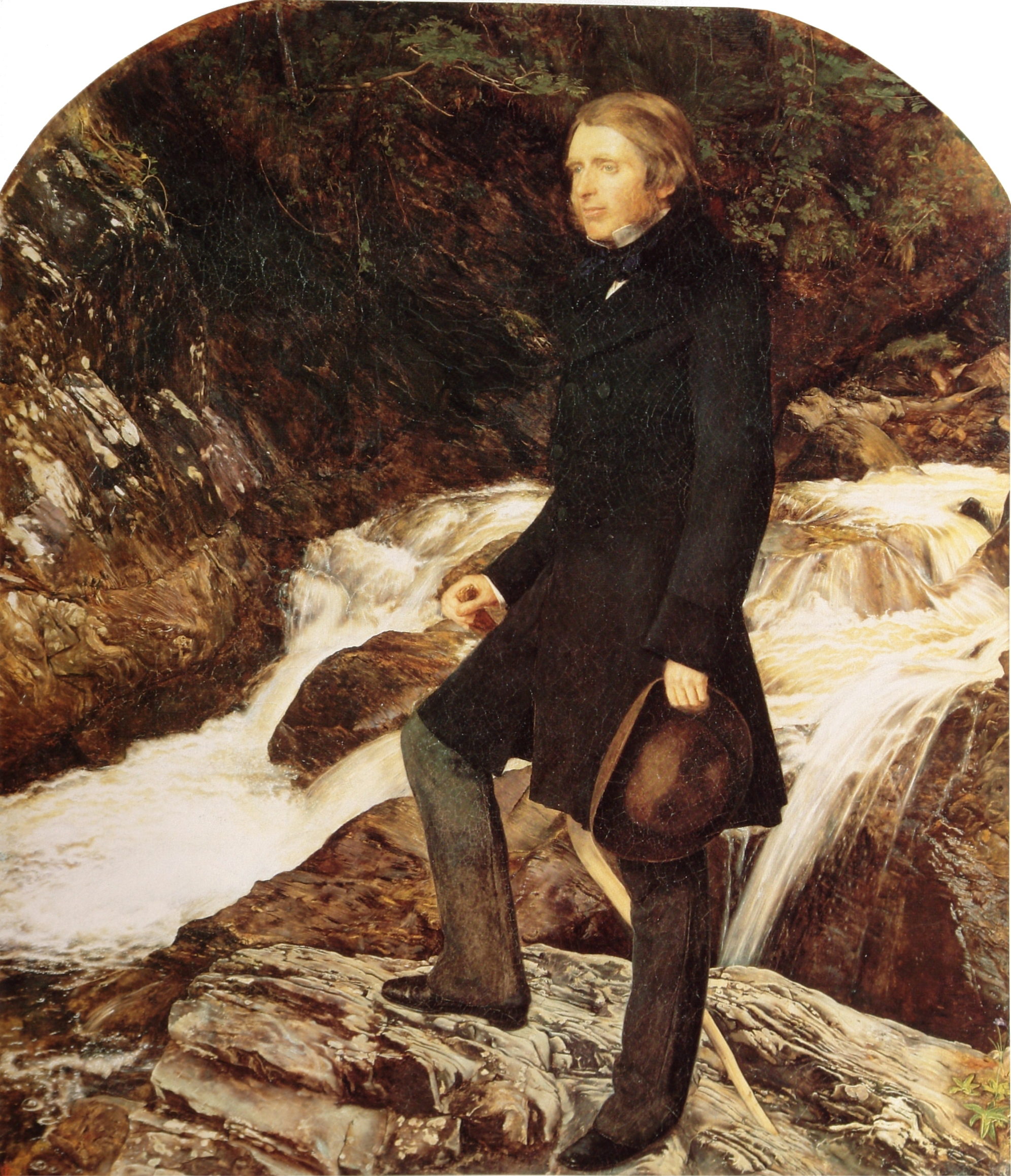
Painting of John Ruskin, founder of the Guild.

His utopian ideal was to stimulate greater happiness and improved health by promoting sound and responsible personal conduct, and by reconnecting society with the ennobling beauty of nature. By means of his "Letters to the Workmen and Labourers of Great Britain", Fors Clavigera (1871–1884), he sought to recruit "Companions" (the name he gave to members of the Guild) to join him in an effort to establish "a National Store instead of a National Debt". As the Guild’s Master, Ruskin endowed it with a tithe, or personal donation, of £7000. He set about acquiring land which could be cultivated sustainably, as far as possible using traditional methods (hand-labour, wind and water-power), and assembling an educational collection of beautiful and precious books, art-works and other objects.

In principle, Ruskin worked out different grades of "Companion" for his hierarchical Guild. He also wrote codes of practice, described styles of dress and even designed the Guild’s own coins. He also wished to establish St George’s Schools, and published various volumes to aid its teaching (his Bibliotheca Pastorum or Shepherd’s Library), but the schools, like the dress and coins, never materialised. In part, this is because soon after Ruskin started the Guild he began to show signs of emotional disturbance and in 1878 suffered the first of a series of mental breakdowns that increasingly limited his activity. In reality, the Guild has always operated on a modest scale, its activities being suggestive rather than transformational, but always dynamic, adapting to changing circumstances and needs.

Since 1871, some of the Guild's Companions have included: Lord Courtauld-Thomson, W. G. Collingwood, Sir Emery Walker, Sir Hubert Llewellyn Smith, Sir Evelyn Wrench, Emily Warren, William Lethaby, Alfred Hoare Powell, Almyra Gray, Katharine Harris Bradley, J. Howard Whitehouse, John Henry Chamberlain, Frances Colenso, Benjamin Creswick, Frederick Leach, William Monk, Sydney Morse, William Smart, Fanny Talbot, T. Edmund Harvey and Victor Branford.

=== Land and education ===
The Board of Trade recognised the Guild on 25 October 1878, granting it legal status, so all of its land and property was incorporated in 1879, but Ruskin had already made purchases and some donations had been provisionally accepted.

In 1876, Ruskin purchased land in Totley (Ruskin called it Abbeydale), near Sheffield but in the Derbyshire countryside. It came to be known as St George’s Farm. The early work of this co-operative farming scheme met with only limited success, and was undermined by a series of disagreements (see William Harrison Riley). It was later run as a moderately successful market garden and nursery for fifty years until 1938 (but had been sold by the Guild to its manager, George Pearson, in 1929). In 1878 Ruskin purchased a smallholding, with a cottage, originally for the occupation of John Guy and his family, at Cloughton Moor, in North Yorkshire. The Guys moved in 1882, and the land was sold in 1910.

Donations from wealthy and committed Companions placed several parcels of land and various properties in the Guild’s care:

- eight cottages on a steep hillside at Barmouth, north-west Wales donated by Mrs Fanny Talbot in 1872 (sold by the Guild to the local council in 1972);
- 20 acres (8 hectares) of woodland in the Wyre Forest, near Bewdley, Worcestershire (increased from an original offer of 7 acres (2.8 hectares) in 1871) was donated in 1877 by George Baker (the Guild's second Master, 1900–1910). St George’s Farm was built here in 1907–1908. More land was bought by Guild Companions eager to live a "Ruskinian" life, notably those involved in the Liverpool Ruskin Society. As such, by 1889, Thomas and Margaret Harley (née Cox) established a fruit farm on land bought from Baker (St John's Cottage); Companion and Guild historian, Edith Hope Scott, settled at a cottage, Atholgarth, in the Wyre Forest (from 1908); Harrison and Margaret Fowler settled at Oak Grove (1912–1920); Uncllys Farm and some adjacent land was purchased by the Guild in 1929. More land was acquired by the Guild in the 1930s (St George's Bungalow was built in 1938), and the Guild remains a significant presence today in the Wyre Forest; Ruskinland is a national nature reserve;
- a field of limestone grassland (St George's Field) at Sheepscombe, Gloucestershire (now an "unimproved" (unspoilt) national nature reserve) donated by Margaret E. Knight in 1936–37;
- nine arts-and-crafts-style houses in Westmill, near Buntingford, Hertfordshire, bequeathed by Mrs Mary Hope Greg (1850–1949), whose husband's family owned Quarry Bank Mill at Styal, in Cheshire. All but two, which were sold, remain in the Guild’s hands. (A generous benefactor, Mrs Greg, who became a companion in the 1930s, gifted to the Guild her own nature diaries and other precious items, and Green Pastures bungalow in Holcombe, near Bath (sold in 1962-3)).

Ruskin also wished to see traditional rural handicrafts revived. St George’s Mill was established at Laxey, on the Isle of Man, producing cloth goods. Furthermore, Ruskin encouraged independent, but allied, efforts in spinning and weaving at Langdale, in other parts of the Lake District and elsewhere, producing linen and other goods exhibited by the Home Arts and Industries Association and similar organisations. The Guild became a registered charity on 5 January 1971.

=== Museum ===
In Sheffield, in 1875, Ruskin established St George's Museum for the working men of that city and surrounding areas, and particularly for the local iron workers whom he much admired. It was situated until 1889 in a cottage on high ground in Bell Hagg Road, Walkley, in north-west Sheffield. Its first curator was Henry Swan (1825-1889), a former pupil of Ruskin's at the London Working Men's College, and he was assisted by his wife, Emily (1835-1909). The museum, which was free to enter, was open until 9pm, on Sunday afternoons, and by appointment at other times, in order to maximise its accessibility for working people.

The museum housed a growing collection of artworks, including pencil sketches, architectural drawings, watercolors, and copies of works by Old Masters, as well as minerals, geological specimens, casts of sculpture, illuminated manuscripts, rare books, coins, and seals. Through the museum, Ruskin sought to make artworks and cultural objects, which were often accessible primarily to the wealthy enough to travel throughout Europe, available to working-class visitors. The original Museum has been recreated "virtually" online.

In 1890, the relocated and newly styled Ruskin Museum opened at Meersbrook Park, and remained there until 1950. After a period of great uncertainty, the Guild collection was removed in 1964 to the library at Reading University's London Road campus. However, the collection returned to Sheffield in 1981, and was displayed at the Ruskin Gallery situated in the former Hayes Wine Store on Norfolk Street from 1985 to 2001. Since 2001, it has been part of Sheffield's Millennium Gallery.

== The Guild today ==
In 2001, the Guild’s collection moved to the Ruskin Gallery in Sheffield’s new Millennium Galleries. In 2011, the gallery was re-named the Ruskin Collection.

The Guild strives to maintain Ruskin’s principles and achieve his aims in the twenty-first century. It is funding a nine-year cycle of Triennial Exhibitions there. The Guild still manages and lets its properties at Westmill in line with Ruskin’s notions of care and justice (charging fair rents and diligently maintaining the properties). One hundred acres (40 hectares) of ancient woodland and two smallholdings near Bewdley are sympathetically cultivated. A rebuilt barn, called the "Ruskin Studio", acts as a base for the Wyre Community Land Trust, which engages with a wide range of local projects, promoting rural crafts and skills, hosting events and receiving educational visits. The Guild funded the national Campaign for Drawing and is still associated with it; arts and crafts and rural economy are fostered; scholarships and awards are sometimes granted; and symposia are held to discuss issues of contemporary concern and debate.

The Guild is run by a Board of Directors, a secretary, and a Master who meet several times a year. Every autumn, Companions attend an Annual General Meeting, which hosts the Ruskin Lecture which is usually published by the Guild, like its journal, The Companion. The Guild's current Companions include Ewan Anderson, Chris Baines, David Ogilvy Barrie, Dinah Birch, Sir Quentin Blake, Peter Burman, Suzanne Fagence Cooper, Peter Day, Frank Field, Lord Field of Birkenhead, Julian Perry, Dame Fiona Reynolds, Jeffrey Richards, Julian Spalding, Stephen Wildman, and Clive Wilmer.

In April 2021 the Isle of Man post office issued a set of six Ruskin commemorative stamps to mark the 150th anniversary of the Guild.

== Masters ==
- 1871–1900 John Ruskin
- 1900–10 George Baker
- 1910–20 George Thomson
- 1920–25 Henry Elford Luxmoore
- 1925–34 Hugh Charles Fairfax-Cholmeley
- 1934–51 Thomas Edmund Harvey
- 1951–54 Alexander Farquharson
- 1954–73 Herbert Arthur Hodges
- 1973–77 Cyril Tyler
- 1977–82 Jon B. Thompson
- 1982–96 Anthony Harris
- 1996–2005 Julian Spalding
- 2005–09 James Shackley Dearden
- 2009–19 Clive Wilmer
- 2019–present Dr Rachel Dickinson

== Bibliography ==
- Barnes, Janet, Ruskin in Sheffield (Museums Sheffield, 2011).
- Dearden, James Shackley, John Ruskin's Guild of St George (Guild of St George, 2010).
- Eagles, Stuart, Ruskin's Faithful Stewards: Henry and Emily Swan (Ruskin Research Blog, 2024).
- Frost, Mark, The Lost Companions and John Ruskin's Guild of St George: A Revisionary History (Anthem Press, 2014.
- Goldsmith, Sally, Thirteen Acres: John Ruskin and the Totley Communists (Guild of St George, 2016).
- Harris, Anthony, Why have our little girls large shoes? Ruskin and The Guild of St George (Guild of St George, 1985; new edn, 2011).
- Hewison, Robert, Art and Society: Ruskin in Sheffield, 1876 (2nd edn, Guild of St George, 2011).
- Morley, Catherine W., John Ruskin: Late Work 1870-1890 (Garland Publishing, 1984).
- Roll of Companions of the Guild of St George (Guild of St George, 2013)
- Scott, Edith Hope, Ruskin's Guild of St George (Methuen, 1931).
- Waithe, Marcus, Ruskin at Walkley: An Illustrated Guide to the Online Museum (Brentham Press for the Guild of St George, 1989; revised edn, Guild of St George, 2011).
- Wardle, Peter and Quayle, Cedric, Ruskin and Bewdley (Guild of St George, 2007).
