= Stevie Wishart =

British musician

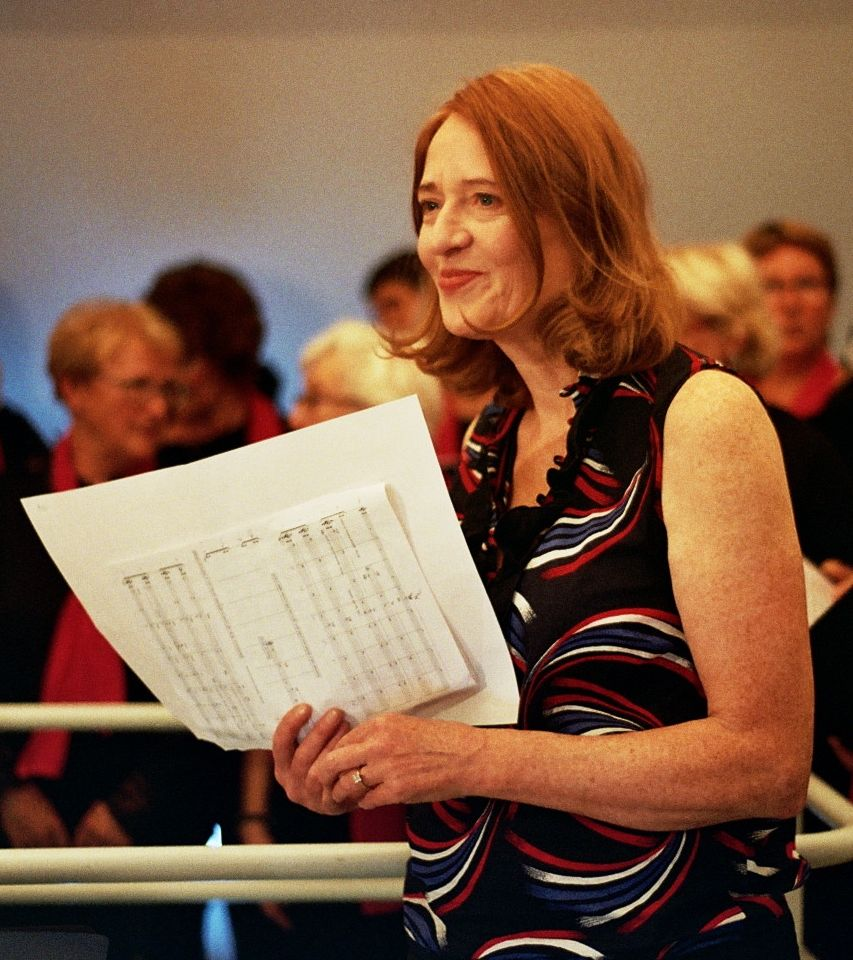

Background information
- Occupation(s): Musician, composer
- Instrument(s): hurdy-gurdy, violin, electronic music
- Labels: Decca

Stevie Wishart is a composer, improviser, and performer on the hurdy-gurdy and violin. Mainly involved in contemporary music, she has also had a career in early music and has edited and recorded the complete works of Saint Hildegard of Bingen, as well as performing music from the repertoire of the medieval troubadours, trouvères and the Cantigas de Santa Maria, with her ensemble Sinfonye.

Wishart's work is distinguished by her emphasis on exploring music's unique ability to express ideas, transcending other forms of communication. She creates music for a wide variety of contexts. Examples include productions by Michèle Noiret (Théâtre National de Bruxelles) and Wayne McGregor; a large-scale choral work for a Proms commission with the BBC Singers & Sinfonye; and for the designer Philippe Starck.

Wishart has performed and had her compositions played at major venues including the Queen Elizabeth Hall and Royal Festival Hall in London, the Sydney Opera House, St. Peter's Basilica and records for Decca Records, Hyperion and Glossa records, and Splitrec, as well as for her own and other indie labels. Collaborations include composing for Ensemble Variances, a contemporary ensemble directed by Thierry Pécou, British poet Alice Oswald, and Tom Kemp’s Chamber Domaine.

Concern for the environment is a natural extension of Wishart's creativity. She is a member of art/science network Fo.am and a founder member of the nature-music Ecotones Network. Her compositions often use the sounds of endangered species as themes, particularly in recent orchestral, chamber and vocal works.

Wishart was educated at Cambridge, Oxford, and the Guildhall School of Music, studying composition and electronic music at the University of York with Trevor Wishart and Richard Orten. She then studied improvised and aleatoric music with John Cage and David Tudor. Later she was a member of performance ensemble Machine for Making Sense with Chris Mann, Rik Rue, Amanda Stewart and Jim Denley.

== Selected works ==
- "Last Dance" a Baroque Tango – BBC Proms, Royal Albert Hall, London, performed by the Dunedin Consort (world premiere)
- “Voicing the Dawn” – commissioned for Ex Cathedra, premiere of version for solo voices – Hereford Cathedral, premiere for version for full choir – Birmingham Cathedral.
- En Fugue Music – sound-track for – A Light's Travelogue by Els van Riel.
- Out of the Mists – for harpsichord and piano. 3 August 2017. A tone poem for harpsichord and piano inspired by the mists of the River Dart. World premiere performed by Joanna Macgregor – piano, Jane Chapman – harpsichord at the Dartington International Summer School.
- A journey between cities in sound – Eurostar – soprano, clarinet & bass clarinet, harp, double-bass. Commissioned by the Hermes Ensemble, premiere St John's Smith Square, London.
- Rough with the Smooth – Concerto for double bass in the form of a concerto grosso – For string orchestra, harp, theorbo, and harpsichord. Commissioned by the Orchestra of the Age of Enlightenment. 2015. Premiered in the Queen Elizabeth Hall, London, May 2015.
- The Seasons – Cantata – for SATB choir. 2013/2014. Commissioned by the Ipswich Choral Society. Premiere Snape Maltings, Aldeburgh, 2014. With special thanks to Maureen Fell.
- Canti del Paradiso – for 3 upper voices, small-harp, and hurdy-gurdy. 2012. Commissioned for La Fede di Dante – il canto xxiv del paradiso, at the Chiesa del Gesu, Rome in the presence of Cardinal Ravasi Presidente del Pontificio Consiglio della Cultura of the Vatican, Rome (and live for RAI TV).
- Out of this World – for SATB Choir. Commissioned by BBC Radio 3 for the BBC Singers, premiered at the BBC Proms on 27 August 2011 at the Cadogan Hall, performed by the BBC Singers and Sinfonye. Broadcast 27 August 2011. Each movement may be performed separately.
- Iced – for chamber orchestra, theremin, and live computer-generated sound, sound-transformation, and multi-speaker sound-diffusion, 2004. Commissioned by Ensemble Musiques Nouvelles, Belgium and Art Zoyd, Transfrontalier de Productions et de Créations Musicales, Valenciennes & Brussels 2004–2005.

== Installations and performances ==
=== Works in progress ===
Soundscape and live performance (23 June) for Julian Perry's Foliate Bosses for the 2025 Aldeburgh Festival, 24 May to 29 June, 2

== Selected recordings ==
- VIRIDITAS (2024)
- Rhywbeth arall (2024)

=== Improvisation ===
- VIOLET.
- The Act of Obsession Becomes the Object Itself – by the group Machine for Making Sense: Jim Denley, Rik Rue, Amanda Stewart, and Stevie Wishart.
- The Compass, Log and Lead – composed and performed by Stevie Wishart, Fred Frith and Carla Kihlstedt.
- Aquatic, track 2, as guest with jazz trio The Necks.
