= Jim Denley =

Jim Denley (b 1957) is one of Australia's foremost improvisers of new music known for his improvisations on wind instruments and electronics. His radio work Collaborations, produced by ABC Radio National radio won the 1989 Prix Italia for radio production. He was a member of the group Machine for Making Sense with Rik Rue, Amanda Stewart, Chris Mann and Stevie Wishart and the medieval music group Sinfonye, led by Stevie Wishart, in which he played frame drums, including the square medieval pandeiro.

He has performed in Australia, Europe, Japan and the US with artists such as Chris Abrahams, Clare Cooper, Keith Rowe, Joel Stern, Robbie Avenaim, Jon Rose, John Butcher, Otomo Yoshihide, Fred Frith, Phil Niblock, Trey Spruance, Clayton Thomas, Tess de Quincy, Axel Dörner, Adam Sussman, Ami Yoshida, Oren Ambarchi, Tony Buck, Ikue Mori, Sachiko M, Malcolm Goldstein, Michael Sheridan and Annette Krebs.
