= Fanny Talbot =

English philanthropist (1824–1917)

Fanny Talbot (née) Browne (1824–1917) was a landowner and philanthropist, and a friend and correspondent of the influential art critic John Ruskin. She is noted for donating the first property—4.5 acres (1.8 ha) of land known as Dinas Oleu at Barmouth, Gwynedd—to the National Trust.

== Life and works ==
Fanny Browne was born in Bridgwater, Somerset, in 1824, the daughter of Mary and John Browne. In 1850, she married George Tertius Talbot and they had one son George Quartus (Quarry) Talbot, born in 1854. The couple lived in the household of her parents in Bridgwater.

She moved to Ty'n-y-Ffynon, a cottage in Barmouth, North Wales following her husband’s death in 1873 aged 47 and devoted herself to local philanthropic work.

At the end of 1874, Talbot made Ruskin an offer, through a mutual friend, for the Guild of St George, of twelve or thirteen cottages and a 4.5-acre area of land at Barmouth. Her generous offer astonished Ruskin and their friendship was established on a note of great cordiality.

Talbot’s correspondence with Ruskin continued until 1889. Both were keen chess players and played games by correspondence. Among other subjects they discussed were the Guild of St George and Talbot's son, Quartus (Quarry), an aspiring artist.

Of Talbot, Ruskin wrote: "She's a motherly, bright, black-eyed woman of fifty with a nice married son who is a superb chessplayer. She herself is a very good one, and it's her greatest indulgence to have a written game with me. She's an excellent nurse, and curious beyond any magpie that ever was, but always giving her spoons away instead of stealing them. Practically clever beyond most women; but if you answer one question she'll ask you six!"

Talbot supported Canon Rawnsley, Octavia Hill and other public-minded citizens in the work of founding the National Trust. She donated Dinas Oleu to the National Trust after its foundation in 1895. Oleu is a 4.5 acres (1.8 ha) stretch of rugged hillside, to which a further 13 acres (5.3 ha) have since been added.

Talbot lived at Ty'n-y-Ffynon until her death in 1917. She had shared her home with her friend Blanche Atkinson, novelist and author of children's books, who died in 1911. The house bears a memorial plaque for Talbot.
