= Amanda Stewart =

Australian artist (born 1959)

- Born: 1959 (age 65–66)
- Known for: Poetry, sound/performance art
- Notable work: I/T: Selected poems 1978-1998, The Sinking of the Rainbow Warrior
- Awards: Åke Blomström Award (1988), Anne Elder Award (1999)

Amanda Stewart (born 1959) is a contemporary Australian poet and sound/performance artist.

Amanda Stewart began writing and performing poetry in the 1970s and has since produced a wide array of sound, video and multimedia work. In the 1980s she worked for ABC radio as a producer. Amanda Stewart received the Åke Blomström Award in 1988. In 1989 she co-founded the performance ensemble Machine for Making Sense with Chris Mann, Rik Rue, Jim Denley and Stevie Wishart, and in 1995 started the trio Allos. She has toured Europe, the United States and Japan. She co-wrote and directed the 1990 film Eclipse of the Man-Made Sun about nuclear weapons in popular culture. Her opera The Sinking of the Rainbow Warrior, written with the composer Colin Bright, was performed as part of the Sydney Festival on Sydney Harbour in 1997. It has since been produced for radio by the ABC Radio National. Her collected works book and CD entitled I/T won the 1999 Anne Elder Award for poetry.

== Works ==
- I/T: Selected poems 1980–1996. (Sydney: Here and There/Split Records, 1998) ISBN 978-0-9585392-4-1
- Clemens, Justin, et al. “Noise and Voice: An Interview with Amanda Stewart.” Sydney Review of Books, 03 Oct. 2017, 1 May. 2020, sydneyreviewofbooks.com/interview/noise-and-voice-an-interview-with-amanda-stewart/.
- Poems by Amanda Stewart. Jacket2, 29 Nov. 2011, 27 April 2020, jacket2.org/poems/poems-amanda-stewart.
