= George Baker (mayor) =

British industrialist, philanthropist and Liberal politician (1825–1910)

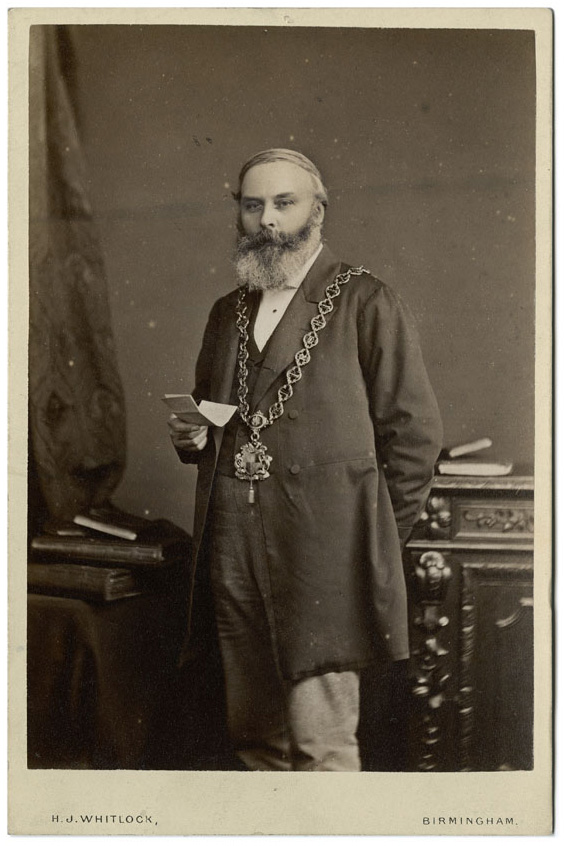
- Alderman George Baker

George Baker (1825–1910) was a British industrialist and Liberal politician and philanthropist. He was born in Birmingham on 11 May 1825, from a long-established Quaker family.

He was educated at the Friends' School, Ackworth, West Yorkshire, but started work at his father's blacking factory aged 15.

== Birmingham City Council ==
He was elected to Birmingham city council in 1869, becoming an Alderman in 1874. In June 1876 he was elected Mayor of Birmingham, on the resignation of Joseph Chamberlain, and was re-elected mayor in November of that year. He continued as a strong supporter of the Liberal Party even when Chamberlain split with the party over Irish home rule.

== Ruskin and Bewdley ==
Baker was a staunch Quaker and a life-long admirer of John Ruskin’s Utopian ideals. A prominent member of Ruskin's Guild of St George, he succeeded Ruskin to become the second master of the Guild on Ruskin's death in 1900.

In 1870 Baker acquired 381 acres of woodland in the Wyre Forest near Bewdley, Worcestershire from a sale of Crown property. He offered 7 acres to Ruskin the following year, increasing his offer to 20 acres in 1877, the year that Ruskin paid his one and only visit to the area.

I have been staying for two days with the good Mayor of Birmingham, and he has shown me St.George's Land, his gift, in the midst of a sweet space of English hill and dale and orchard, yet unhurt by hand of man.

This land, including Atholgarth and St George's Farm, became the nucleus of what is now the Guild's Ruskin Land project.

Between 1875 and 1877 he commissioned the construction of Beaucastle, a major country house in the Arts and Crafts style near Bewdley. The house's architect Richard Doubleday corresponded closely with Ruskin on design and construction of the house. The house features four stained-glass windows by Edward Burne-Jones, thought to have been made in William Morris's factory, although this cannot be verified. He served as mayor of Bewdley in 1888–9.

== Death ==
Baker was twice married. He died on 15 January 1910, and is buried at Birmingham city cemetery, Witton.
