= Tall Poppies Records =

Tall Poppies Records is an Australian record label founded in September 1991 by Belinda Webster. It focuses on recording solo and chamber music in the classical genre. It is particularly dedicated to promoting the work of Australian composers.

The name of the label derives from the "tall poppy syndrome", because those involved feel that, in Australia, there is a tendency to criticise or downplay those who achieve success.

== Musician list ==
=== Composers ===
- Peter Sculthorpe
- Ross Edwards
- Nigel Westlake
- Georges Lentz
- Carl Vine
- David Stanhope
- Andrew Ford
- Andrew Schultz
- Anne Boyd
- Nigel Butterley
- Tristram Cary
- Elena Kats-Chernin
- Anne Ghandar
- Graeme Koehne
- Rik Rue
- Martin Wesley-Smith
- Bruce Cale

=== Performers ===
- Australia Ensemble
- Song Company
- Australian Youth Orchestra
- David Pereira
- Ian Munro
- Merlyn Quaife
- Lisa Moore
- Michael Kieran Harvey
- Stephanie McCallum
- David Stanhope
- Geoffrey Lancaster
- Timothy Kain
- Riley Lee
- Roy Howat
- David Bollard
- Sydney Chamber Choir
- Goldner String Quartet

== See also ==
- List of record labels
