= Julian Perry =

English painter (born 1960)

- Born: 1960 (age 65–66); Worcester, England
- Education: Maidenhead College of Art and Design; University of the West of England
- Occupation: Artist
- Known for: Landscape painting

Julian Perry (born 19 January 1960 in Worcester, England) is a London-based British artist. He is a Companion of the Guild of St George and a member of Contemporary British Painting.

== Career ==
Perry studied at Maidenhead School of Art and Design from 1977 to 1980, and Bristol Polytechnic from 1978 to 1981. After graduating, Perry moved to East London, and began painting the area around his home in Leyton. He established a reputation for romantic urban realism.

In 1998, Perry was invited by Bristol City Art Gallery to create a work depicting the tower blocks at Hartcliffe. Perry's work then shifted to the wider landscape of Brownfield sites and nature reserves. In 2003, he produced a show for London's Guildhall Art Gallery on the theme of Epping Forest. This was followed in 2007 with a series depicting local allotment sheds destroyed in preparation for the London 2012 Olympic Site.

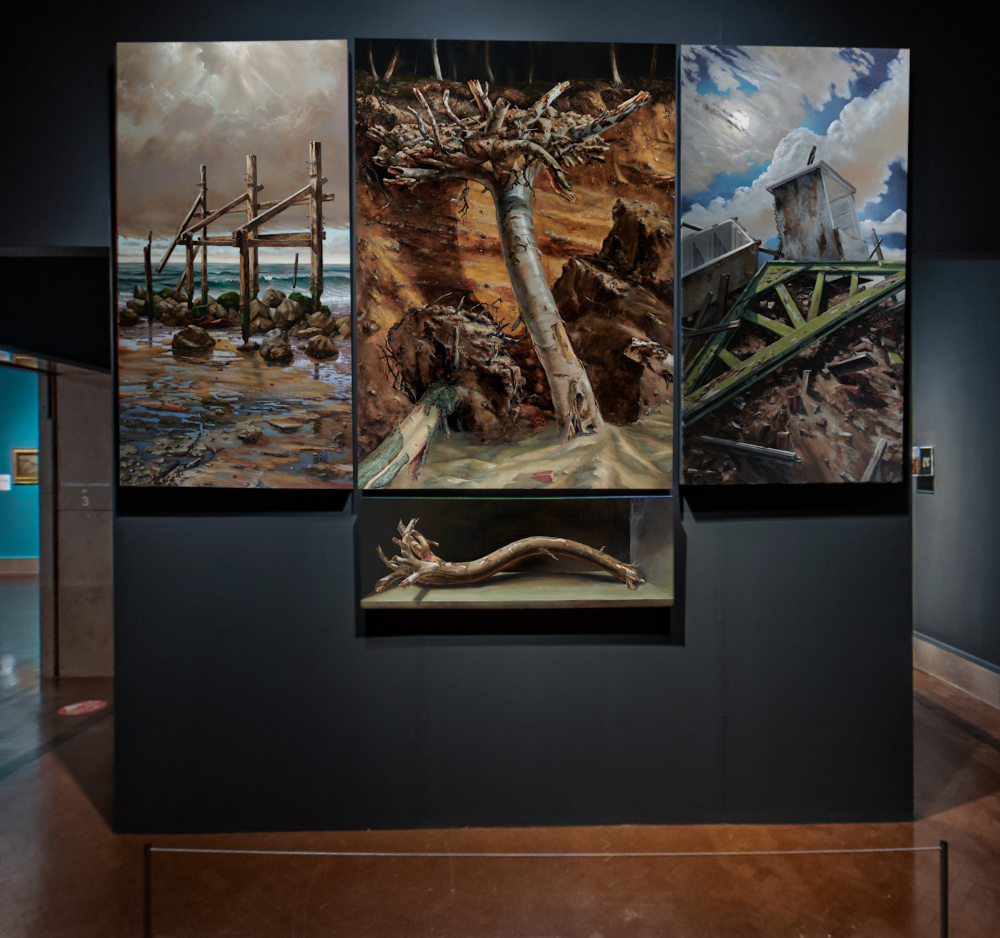
Altarpiece to the Assumption of C02 at the Southampton City Art Gallery in 2022.

Perry's paintings of specific locations and natural phenomenon, often under environmental threat or affected by human interventions, explore the strained relationships between people and nature. Since 2012, coastal erosion and the impact of climate change have dominated Perry's work. These themes took center stage in works Perry exhibited in 2015 at the Venice Biennale, and in 2022 at the Southampton City Art Gallery.

In 2025, Perry was included in the major survey of historic coastal visual arts: 'Can the Seas Survive Us' at the Sainsbury Centre for Visual Arts, University of East Anglia (UEA). For the 2025 Aldeburgh Festival, Perry created a large exhibition, collaborating with the composer Stevie Wishart.

Perry's works are held in several public collections, including the Bristol City Museum and Art Gallery, London Transport Museum, Middlesbrough Institute of Modern Art, The Museum of London, the London Guildhall Collection, Harlow Art Trust, Southampton City Art Gallery, Gainsborough House, and the personal collection of King Charles III.

== Selected exhibitions ==
- 1987: Whitechapel Open. Whitechapel Gallery, London.
- 1998: High Rise, Oak House Hartcliff. Bristol City Museum and Art Gallery.
- 2004: Testament: The Epping Forest Paintings. London Guildhall Art Gallery.
- 2007: Julian Perry. Austin Desmond Fine Art
- 2014: Arboretum: Royal West of England Academy.
- 2015: Vita Vitale, Azerbaijan Pavilion. Venice Biennale.
- 2015: When Yellow Leaves. Mascalls Gallery.
- 2017: The County of Elms. Gainsborough's House Gallery.
- 2019: Art of the City, London as Seen by Painters. London Guildhall Art Gallery.
- 2022: There Rolls the Deep. Southampton City Art Gallery.
- 2025: A World of Water. Sainsbury Centre for Visual Arts.
- 2025: The Foliate Bosses, collaboration with composer Stevie Wishart. Aldeburgh Festival, Snape Maltings.

== Selected TV and Radio ==
- 2008: Interviewed guest. BBC Radio 4 Front Row.
- 2012: Contributing artist. This Green and Pleasant Land, The Story of British Landscape Painting. BBC 4 TV.
- 2017: Contributing artist. The Antagonists - Rivalries in Art Constable Vs Turner. Arte Anglo German French TV documentary.
- 2019: Contributing artist. Constable: A Country Rebel. BBC 4 TV.
- 2022: Contributing panelist. Free Thinking, Climate Change, Nature, and Art. BBC Radio 3.
- 2024: Selected commentator. Art on the BBC Season 1 - Constable: The Rural Rebel. BBC 4 TV.

== Selected works and Installations ==
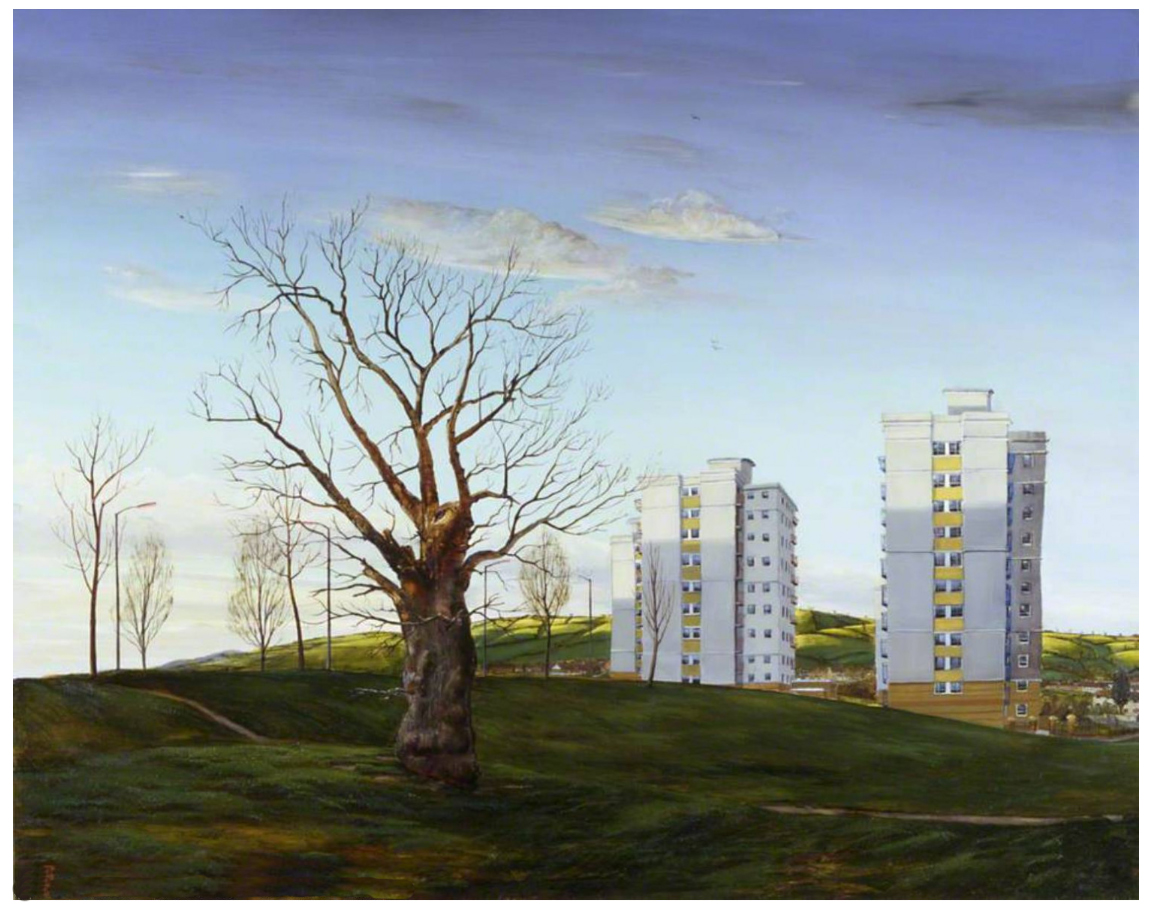
Oak House Hartcliffe, 1998. Collection of Bristol City Art Gallery. See also Art Uk.

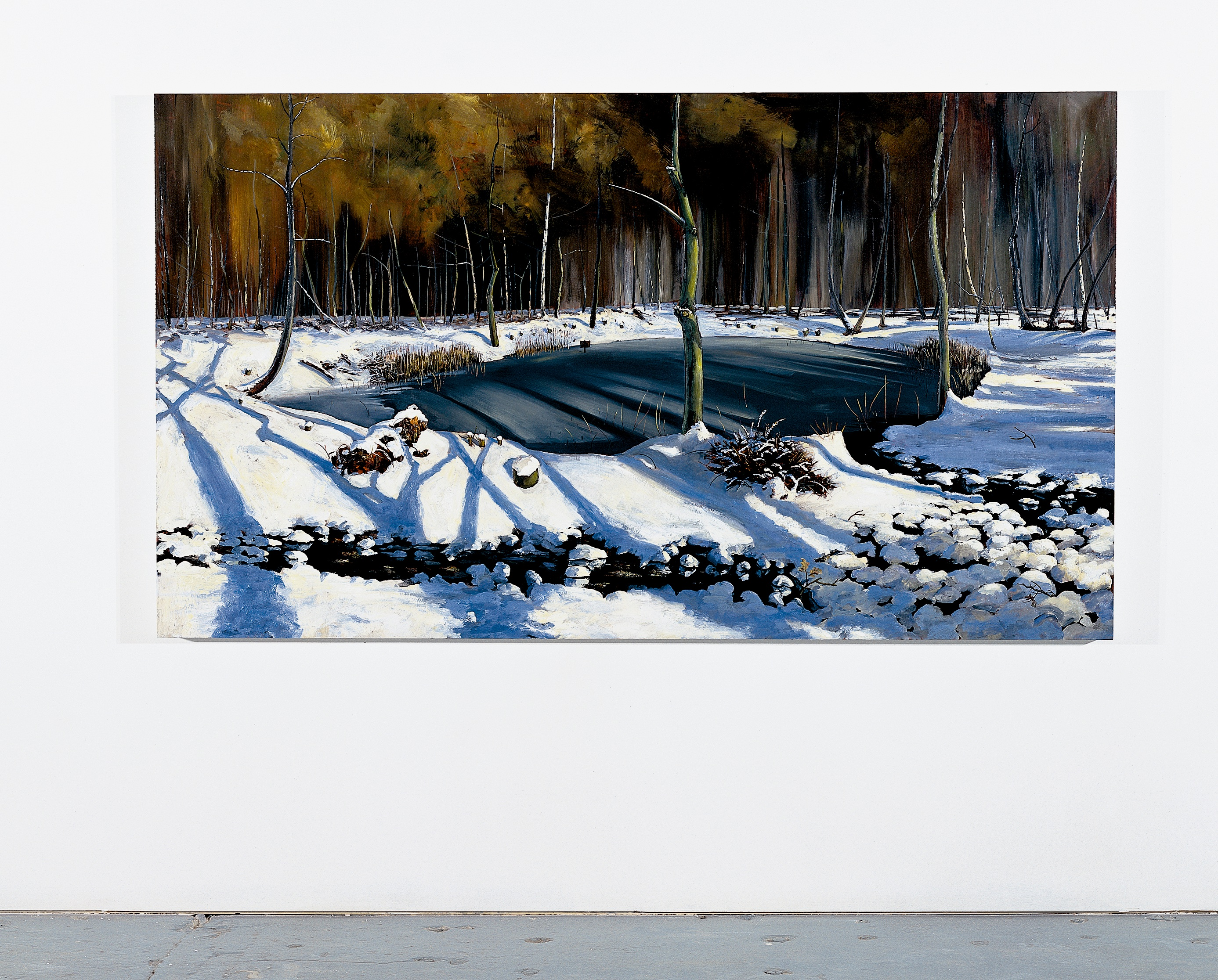
Rocket Crater Pond, 2004. Collection of the London Guildhall Art Gallery.

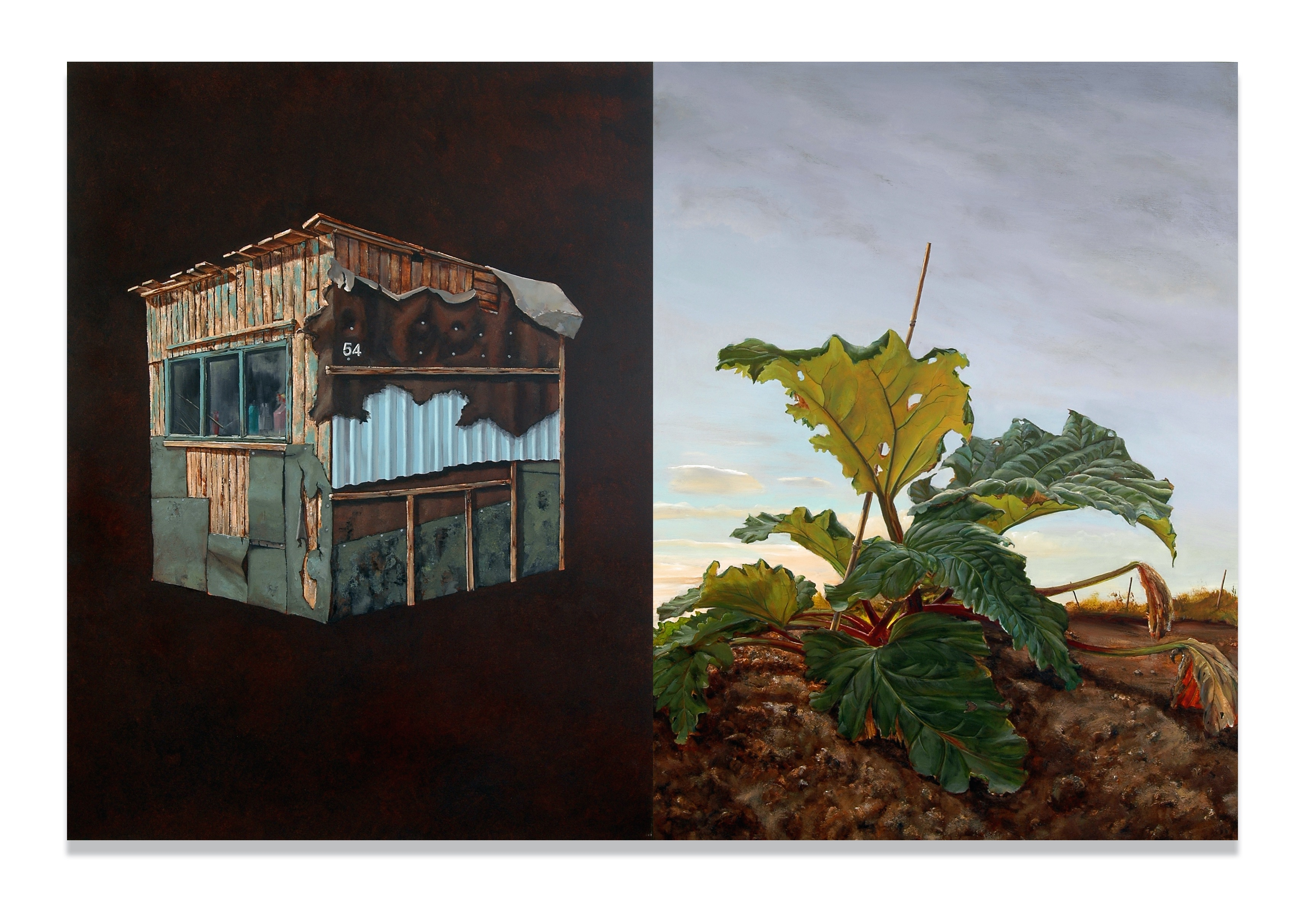
Shed 54 and Rhubarb, 2007. Collection of the Museum of London.

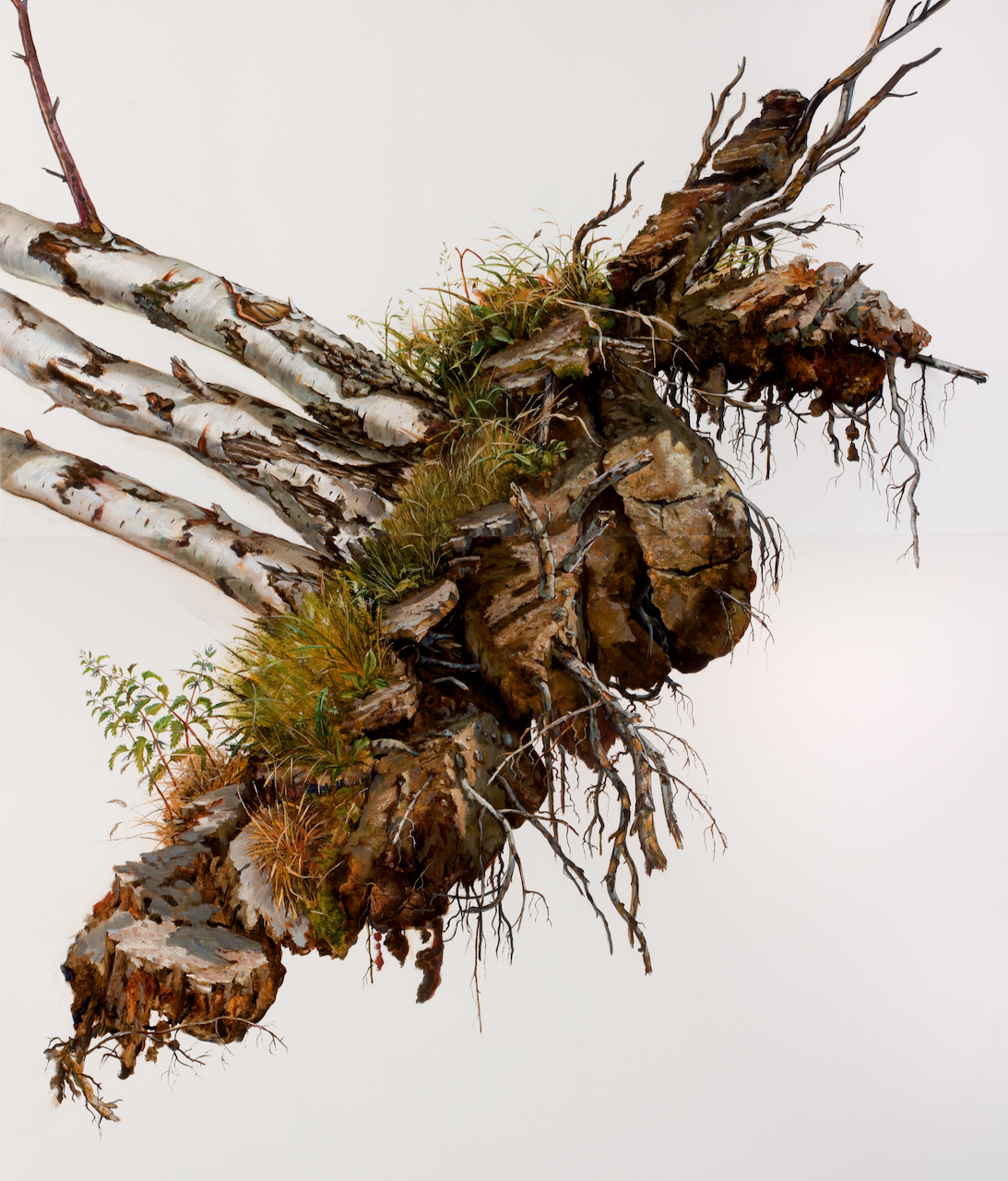
Benacre Birch 3, 2015–21. Collection of the Artist.

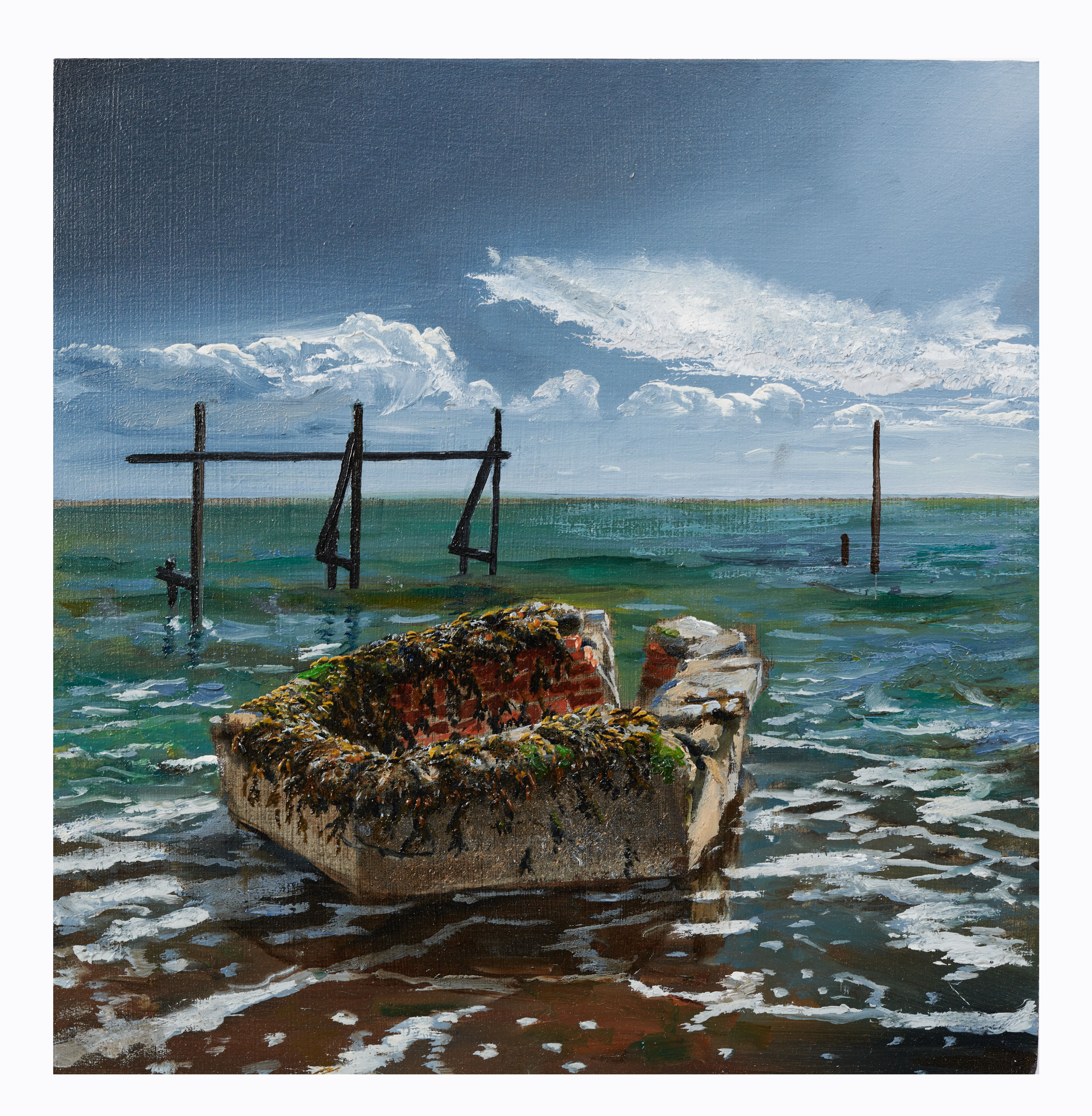
Pillbox with Incoming Tide 1, 2021. Collection of Southampton City Art Gallery. See also Art Uk.

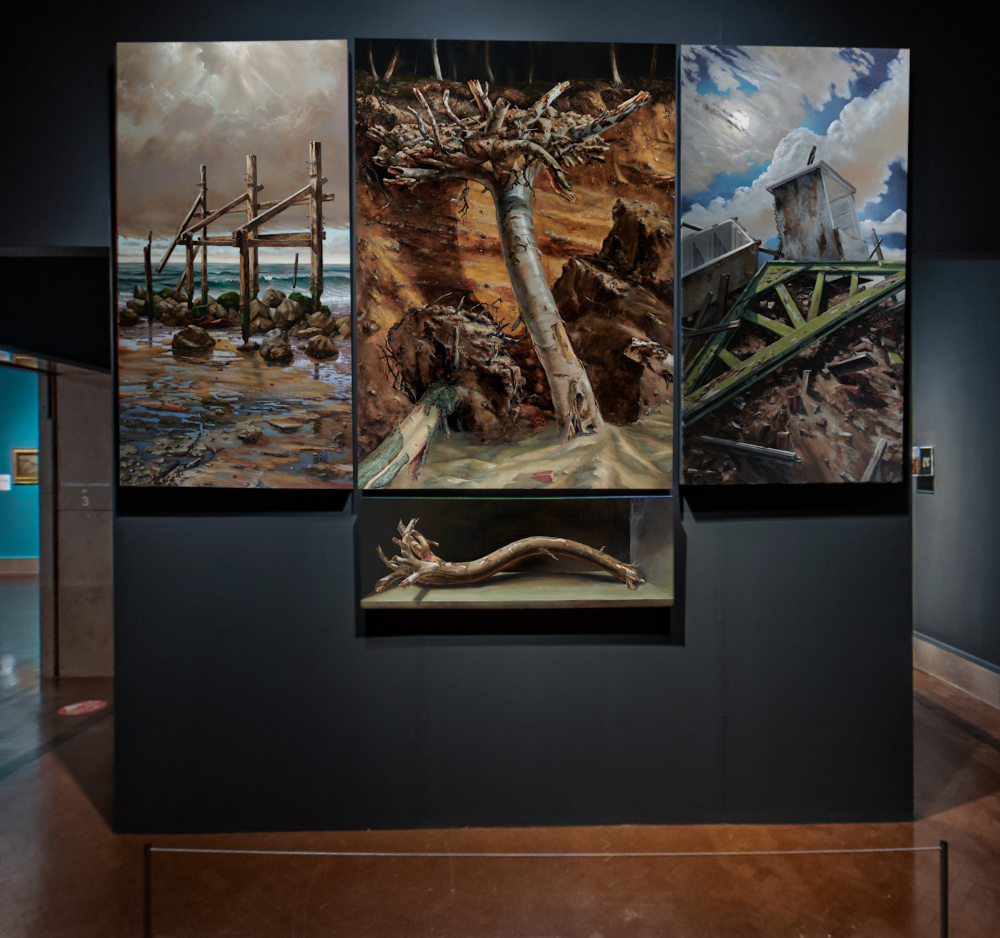
Altarpiece to the Assumption of C02, 2022. Installation at Southampton City Art Gallery.

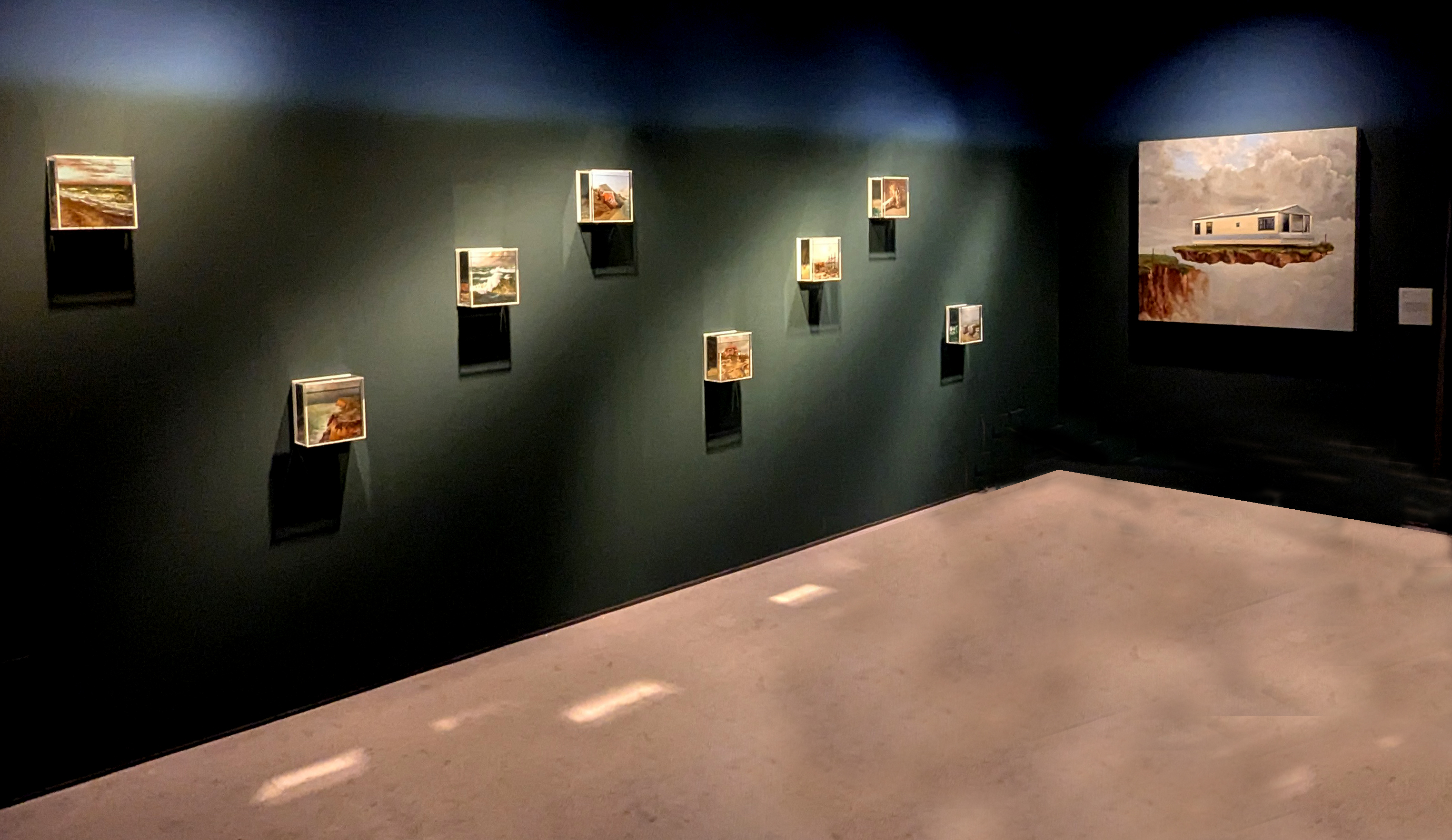
A World of Water - Ten works by Julian Perry, 2025. Installation at Sainsbury Centre, Norwich UK

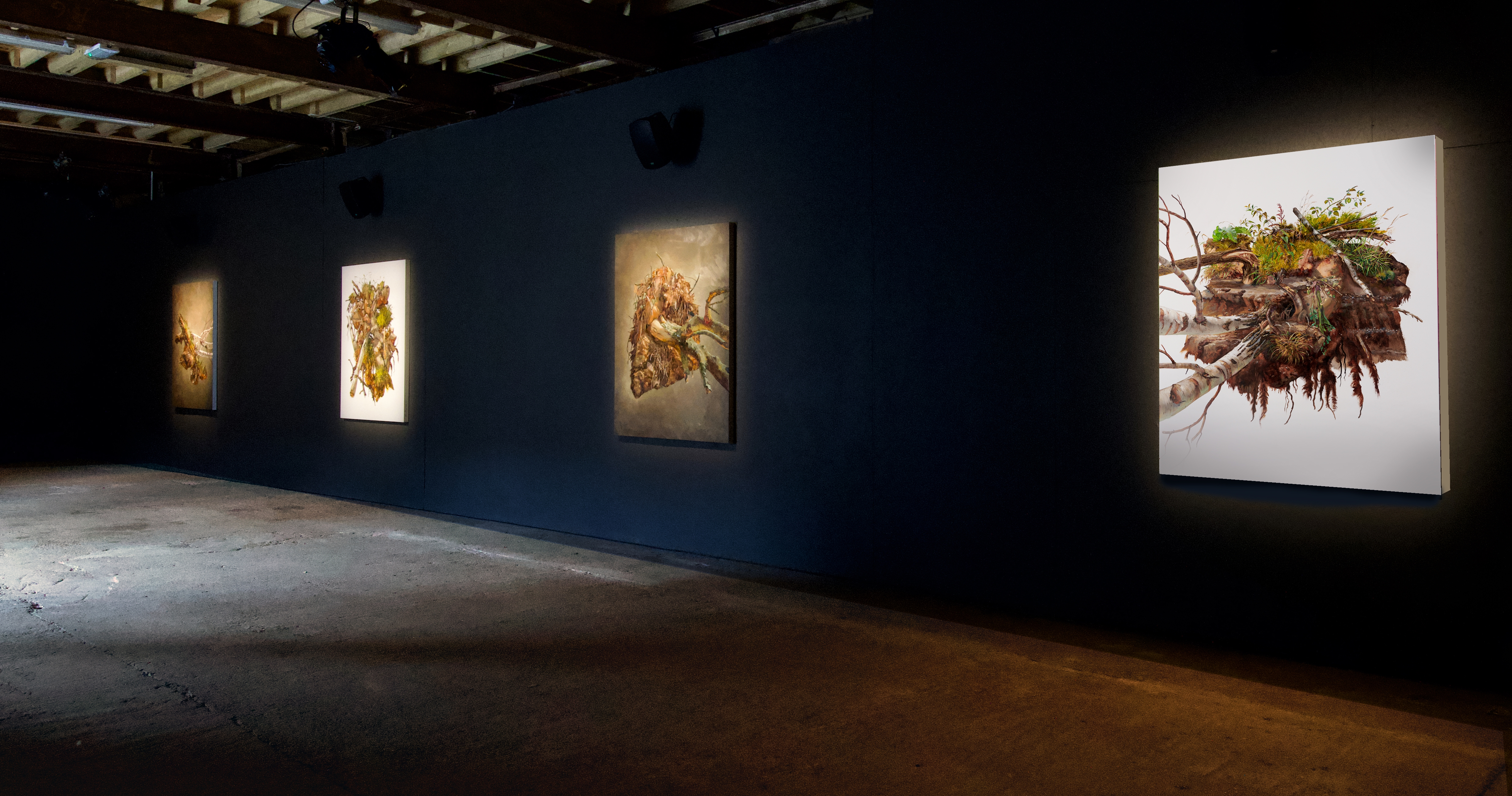
The Foliate Bosses, 2025. Installation at Snape Maltings for the 75th Aldeburgh Festival.
