= Stephen Wildman =

Professor of art history and author from the United Kingdom

- Born: 1951 (age 74–75)
- Education: Bedford Modern School
- Alma mater: Queens' College, Cambridge
- Known for: Art Historian
- Scientific career
- Institutions: Queens' College, Cambridge; Birmingham Museum and Art Gallery; Lancaster University

Stephen Wildman (born 1951) is Emeritus Professor of the History of Art at the University of Lancaster and formerly Director of the Ruskin Library and Research Centre.

Wildman was educated at Bedford Modern School, and Queens' College, Cambridge. He was a Research Fellow and Director of Studies in History of Art at Queens' College, Cambridge (1976–79), Deputy Keeper of Fine Art at Birmingham Museum and Art Gallery (1980) and also its Curator of Prints and Drawings (1980–96).

He was Chairman of the Birmingham Branch of The Victorian Society between 1987 and 1990. He is also a Companion of the Guild of St George.

Wildman was an Honorary Research Fellow at the University of Birmingham (1991–94), a visiting fellow at Yale University (1994) and has been a committee member of the Walpole Society since 1999.

== Selected works ==
- David Cox, 1783-1859. Published by Birmingham Museums and Art Gallery, 1983
- Visions of love and life: Pre-Raphaelite art from the Birmingham collection, England. Published by Art Services International, 1995
- Edward Burne-Jones, Victorian Artist-Dreamer, by Stephen Wildman. Published by Metropolitan Museum of Art, 1998
- Waking Dreams: The Art of the Pre-Raphaelites from the Delaware Art Museum, by Stephen Wildman. Published by Art Services International, Alexandria, Virginia, 2004
