= Jon Rose =

Australian musical artist

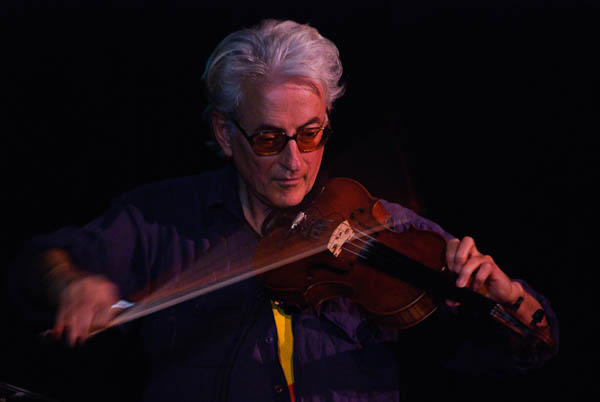
- Rose at STEIM in Amsterdam, 2009

Background information
- Born: 19 February 1951 (age 75); Maidstone, England
- Genre: Free improvisation
- Occupations: Instrumentalist; Composer
- Instruments: Violins, cello, fence, custom-built instruments, interactive electronics, keyboards
- Years active: 1974–present
- Website: www.jonroseweb.com

Jonathan Anthony Rose (born 19 February 1951) is an Australian violinist, cellist, composer, and multimedia artist. Rose's work is centered in the experimental music known as free improvisation, where he has created large environmental multimedia works, built experimental musical instruments, and improvised violin concertos with accompanying orchestra. He has been described by Tony Mitchell as "undoubtedly the most exploratory, imaginative and iconoclastic violin player who has lived in Australia".

== Early life ==
Born in England, Jon Rose attended King's School, Rochester, where he sang in the cathedral choir and studied the violin on scholarship. He discontinued formal violin lessons at the age of 15. Rose studied and performed in a range of genres in Australia and the United Kingdom during the 1970s, including Italian club bands, country & western, bebop, and new music.

== Improvising musician ==
As a genre, free improvisation was developed by European and American musicians in the 1960s. Free improvisation is defined by its lack of rules and is built on a rejection of structural conventions like a set musical form, defined meter, steady tempo, well-defined tonality, or fixed chord changes. Performed in a small group or by an individual soloist, free improvisation is an exploration of expressive sound. Although free to follow their personal musical inclinations and preferences, free improvisers nevertheless develop a personal musical vocabulary from which to draw upon. Practitioners of free improvisation include guitarists Derek Bailey and Fred Frith, as well as saxophonists Evan Parker and John Zorn.

Rose's work in free improvisation in Australia in the mid-1970s included his use of violin tunings and musical temperament along with electronics (both analog and interactive digital). He has performed as a soloist or as a member of a small group of fellow improvisers, including Jim Denley, Louis Burdett, Dave Ellis, Simone De Haan, Veryan Weston and Rik Rue.

== Compositions ==
=== Orchestral compositions ===
Rose has worked as a composer with various ensembles and organizations including Ensemble Offspring, Tura New Music, Decibel, Speak Percussion, Soundstream, the NOW now Festival, and the Adelaide Symphony Orchestra. Some of Rose's compositions for orchestra include Violin Music in the Age of Shopping (1994-1996), which involved the recomposition of a myriad of genres for choir, string orchestra, band, soloists, and sampling (usually by Otomo Yoshihide). The project had performances in Europe, Canada, China, and Australia, and Rose co-authored a book of the same title. In Violin Factory (1999) an orchestra plays satiric string music in the context of mechanical production and reproduction. Performed in Österreichische Rundfunk Concert Hall, Vienna (1999) and at Wogarno Station in Western Australia (2001), the satire was the result of Rose's experiences at two violin factories in China.

Charlie's Whiskers (2004) for string orchestra, piano, saw, and live sampling, pays tribute to composer Charles Ives. Rose's Internal Combustion (2008) is a concerto for amplified orchestra, solo improvised violin, and video. An accompanying video quotes Rose's previous work, such as him riding his custom-built bicycle-powered violin and a violin being played with ping pong balls. It was performed at The Berlin Philharmonic by ensemble Unitedberlin with a commission from the MaerzMusik festival.

The Auctioneer Says (2012) is orchestrated for cello, viola, alto saxophone, electric bass, percussion, and video, with Rose playing an auctioneer. It was commissioned by Decibel New Music in Perth. Ghan Tracks (2014) combines multimedia performance, installation, live radio, and a documentary. Commissioned by Ensemble Offspring, it was performed by them, Speak Percussion, and actors collaborating with the Creative Audio Unit of Radio National at the Australian Broadcasting Corporation.

Rose's Picnic at Broken Hill (2015) was commissioned by Soundstream, and uses a pitch-to-MIDI application. Rose transcribed the piece for piano as the musical contours of a pair of 1915 suicide letters read in Urdu. These were penned by a pair of cameleers accused of attacking a train of picnickers in protest of the Allied campaign at Gallipoli during the First World War. Each hand of the pianist performs a separate re-enacted letter.

=== Radio compositions ===
Rose has used the medium of live radio broadcasts to present original content influenced by historical musical figures and topics. These productions include broadcasts for radio stations such as the Australian Broadcasting Corporation (ABC), the BBC, Westdeutscher Rundfunk (WDR), Saarländischer Rundfunk, Bayerischer Rundfunk, Radio France, Rai Radio 3, Österreichischer Rundfunk, and Sender Freies Berlin (SFB).

- Paganini's Last Testimony (1988) for ABC, which envisions the famous violinist as a celebrity faith healer.
- The Mozart Industry (1993) for Saarländischer Rundfunk, which explores the posthumous industry of Mozart.
- The Long Sufferings of Anna Magdalena Bach (1998) for ABC, inspired by the life and work of J. S. Bach's second wife.
- Skeleton in the Museum (2003) for ABC, a portrait of pianist/composer Percy Grainger that won the 2004 Karl Sczuka Prize.
- Syd and George (2008) for SFB, concerns the relationship between a lyrebird ("George") and his researcher, Syd Curtis. Lyrebirds are expert mimics, and Rose's score for string quartet draws on imitation as an organizing principle.
- Salvado (2009) for BBC, which dramatizes the story of the establishment of an Aboriginal string orchestra by a Spanish priest in 1846.
- Not Quite Cricket (2012) for BBC, which re-examined the first Aboriginal cricket tour to England in 1868.
- Ghan Stories (2014–2015) for ABC, which tells of the Old Ghan railway built from Port Augusta to Alice Springs between 1878 and 1929.

== Environmental works ==
Rose has produced a number of large-scale performances inspired by or set in outdoor environments. In Great Fences of Australia (1983), Rose bowed and recorded wire fences throughout the Australian continent. Typically, Rose uses both the hair and stick of cello and bass bows to sound wire fences, which he supplements with small contact microphones attached at the meeting point of fence wire and fence post. In 2009, Rose was commissioned by Kronos Quartet and The Sydney Opera House to build a set of four fence instruments to be played in concert. Rose then composed Music from 4 Fences for a quartet of fence wire stretched on metal frames.

Rose has performed on the violin accompanied by his videos of outback fences, both those he has bowed and others he only filmed. In the 2010 film The Reach of Resonance, Rose discussed how playing fences as instruments prompted him and others to consider how fences impact the environment.

Rose expanded Great Fences of Australia to other locations including Bosnia, Belfast, the Golan Heights, Mexico, the United States, and Finland. In November 2006, Rose was detained and later released by Israeli Defence Forces while playing a part of the separation fence in Bil'in, a Palestinian village located in the Ramallah and al-Bireh Governorate, 12 kilometres (7.5 mi) west of the city of Ramallah in the central West Bank.

Other environmental projects which explore culturally significant objects include:

- Kayak (2008), a paddle-powered harpsichord performance at Pier 40 in San Francisco, accompanied by Bob Ostertag in a kayak sending accelerometer signals to Rose acting as composer and computer operator.
- Kite Music (2008), in which transmitting kites are fitted with radio video cameras and accelerometers.
- Digger Music (2008), a duet for violin and mechanical excavator.
- Wreck (2013–2017), in which rusting car wrecks were converted into functional music instruments.
- Hills Hoist (2014), in which a clothesline was converted into a propeller-powered wind installation.
- Canto Cracticus (2016), a collaboration with ornithologist Hollis Taylor utilizing the vocalizations of the pied butcherbird. Performances included Singing Up Tyalgum at the 2016 Tyalgum Music Festival and Absolute Bird with recorder virtuoso Genevieve Lacey and the Adelaide Symphony Orchestra.

Rose's projects where the physical activities of sports are augmented by interactive sonic compositions include Squash (1983), Cricket (1985), badminton (Perks 1995 – 1998), netball (Team Music 2008, 2010, 2014), and Skateboard Music (2010).

== Live performances ==
Rose's live performances have included multimedia content, including text, audio, video, and interactive components. In 1998, he began using an interactive bow to modulate the parameters of video (including speed, color, and revolutions) and of sound (pitch including pitch bend, volume, timbre, duration, panning, and silence). The interactive bow manipulated a variety of sounds, from bowing and plucking to a range of electronic sounds, and to preprogrammed samples that play when the bow and violin have certain interactions.

In the 1980s, Rose performed a series of marathon improvised solos. The longest continuous solo (12 hours) was part of Sound Barriers at the Ivan Dougherty Gallery at the Alexander Mackie School of Art in Sydney in 1982, followed by a ten-hour concert at New Music America in Houston in 1986. In Europe, he performed marathon concerts of 3, 5, and 6 hours.

In 2006, John Oswald (composer) invited Rose to improvise a solo part for the Tchaikovsky Violin Concerto with the BBC Scottish Symphony Orchestra. Another violin concerto, Elastic Band (2014), was Rose's collaboration with composer Elena Kats-Chernin, conductor Ilan Volkov, and The Adelaide Symphony Orchestra. Elastic Band saw repeat performances with the Orchestra del Teatro Comunale di Bologna and with the Iceland Symphony Orchestra.

Rose also curated and performed at his own festival, String 'Em Up, which focused on stringed instruments and which travelled to Berlin (1998), Rotterdam (1999), New York City (2000), and Paris (2002).

His multimedia performance works include:

- Pannikin (2005) featured a selection of soloists from Australia Ad Lib. Pannikin showcased a singing dingo, a chainsaw orchestra, a bowed saw orchestra, a livestock auctioneer, a virtuoso of whip techniques, and a performer who simultaneously hums and whistles.
- Pursuit (2009–2013), where Rose utilized a mobile bicycle-powered orchestra of regular and custom-built instruments along with tennis racquets, ping pong balls, buckets, wine bottles, and a kitchen sink, transforming these items into unique music machines.
- Sonic Ball (2015) at the inaugural opening celebrations of the performing arts venue National Sawdust in Brooklyn, New York. For this project, as the audience plays with a huge white ball, the ball's movements (pushing, throwing, rolling) power and transmit an interactive electronic system, producing a sonic outcome.

== Instrument builder ==
Rose's improvisational work led to his building of custom instruments. As a luthier, Rose has built new string instruments and modified conventional ones, as well as repurposed other everyday items. His early instrument building in the 1970s and 1980s incorporated wind, water, and wheels to activate and/or modulate the sound of an array of string types, from violin gut strings to fence wire. This period of instrument building produced over 20 instruments known as the Relative Violins, deconstructed instruments like Rose's double-piston triple-necked wheeling violin, his amplified 19-string tenor cello, which was built in 1981, and his Whipolin, a seven-string disembowelled cello fitted with wheels that are bowed similarly to a hurdy-gurdy. These fully functional, modified instruments have also been displayed as contemporary sculptures, many of them seen in The Rosenberg Museum, a travelling exhibition that also displays Rose's collection of 800+ violins and violin-related objects.

From 1985, Rose worked in conjunction with engineers at the Studio for Electro-Instrumental Music (STEIM) in Amsterdam to develop a series of interactive MIDI bows (and amplified bows) under the title Hyperstring Project. He uses various controllers in his MIDI bows, mounted on both his wrist and on the bows themselves. One controller measures bow pressure and another measures bow arm movement and speed, while foot pedals are played by both feet independently. In this way, Rose is able to simultaneously play multiple lines of melodies and polyrhythms by means of different controllers which measure the physicality of his high speed improvisation.

== Reception ==
New York Times music critic Stephen Holden observed the wide range of Rose's improvisations, from late Romantic tonal solos to freeform explorations. Rose's 27 March 1986 performance at New York City's Experimental Intermedia Foundation featured Super 8 films that Rose shot in the Australian outback consisting of "rapid jump-cut editing and sped-up footage", which Holden described as "the most audacious music improvisations" and "the evening's most ambitious work". Writing about Rose's CD Hyperstring in The Guardian, John L. Walters similarly observed how Rose's violin technique and technological experiments seem to escape any clear musical categories in "a violin-shaped world that is all his own, shot through with wild humour". "Jon Rose is the Thomas Edison of the vibrating string", wrote Ken Waxman in Jazzword.

According to Graham Strahle, Rose has established a reputation as a musical larrikin, observing that Rose has been "pushing boundaries in improvisation and technology for years as a violinist, composer and general musical provocateur, coming up with such wry inventions as the interactive MIDI violin bow and Fence Project – they rival Percy Grainger’s wacky Kangaroo Pouch Tone Tool for unbridled creativity."

Gail Priest from RealTime described Rose's embrace of the Australian landscape in his various musical activities as "Australia made extraordinary". In his review of the CD Futch for The Squid's Ear, Kurt Gottschalk called Rose "a tireless conceptualist, making music out of political borders and rewriting economics and history like a viol-centric Marco Polo".

=== Don Banks Music Award ===
The Don Banks Music Award was established in 1984 to publicly honour a senior artist of high distinction who has made an outstanding and sustained contribution to music in Australia. It was founded by the Australia Council in honour of Don Banks, Australian composer, performer and the first chair of its music board.

Year	Nominee / work	Award	Result
2012	Jon Rose	Don Banks Music Award	awarded

==== Residencies ====
In 2006, Rose was awarded the David Tudor Composer-in-Residence at Mills College and completed a lecture and concert tour of various University of California system campuses that same year. In 2007, Rose was awarded a one-year Peggy Glanville-Hicks Address residency by the Australia Council for the Arts.

== Author ==
Rose has authored works which have been published as the following:

- Linz, Rainer; Rose, Jon (1992). The Pink Violin: An Anthology of Writings About the Music of the Rosenbergs. Melbourne: NMA Publications. ISBN 9780646080031. OCLC 27559089.
- Rose, Jon; Linz, Rainer (1994). Violin Music in the Age of Shopping. NMA Publications. ISBN 978-0646181059. OCLC 31801751.
- Rose, Jon (May 2013). "Jon Rose Platform Papers: Quarterly Essays on the Performing Arts". In Golder, John (ed.). The Music Of Place: Reclaiming a Practice (35th ed.). Currency House. ISBN 9780987211446. OCLC 842124267.
- Rose, Jon (2014). Rosenberg 3.0: Not Violin Music. Blurb. ISBN 978-1320177665. OCLC 910906162.

== Discography ==
Select discography
LP
Year	Title	Label	Notes
1978	Solo Violin Improvisations	Fringe Benefit	
1979	Decomposition	Fringe Benefit	
1984	Tango	HOT	
1987	Forward of Short Leg	Dossier	
1987	Vivisection	AufRuhr	
CD
Year	Title	Label	Notes
1989	Paganini's Last Testimony	Konnex	
1990	Die Beethoven Konversationen	Extraplatte	
1991	Slawterhaus Live	Victo	
1991	The Mozart Industry; Saint Johanna	Extraplatte	
1991	Pulled Muscles	Immigrant	
1992	Violin Music for Restaurants	ReR	
1993	Brain Weather: The Story of the Rosenbergs	ReR	
1993	The Virtual Violin	Megaphone	
1993	Monumental	Intakt	
1994	Violin Music for Supermarkets	Megaphone	
1995	Eine Violine fur Valentin: A Homage to Karl Valentin	No Wave	
1995	Violin Music in the Age of Shopping	Intakt	
1995	Tatakiuri	Creativeman Disc	
1996	Exiles 1	Megaphone	
1996	Techno mit Störungen	Plag Dich Nicht	
1996	Perks	ReR	
1997	://shopping.live@victo	ReR	
1997	China Copy	ReR	
1998	The Fence	ReR	
1999	Sliding	Sonic Factory	
2000	The Hyperstring Project	ReR	
2001	The Violin Factory	Hermes Discorbie	
2001	Transgenic Nomad	Sonore	
2001	The Kryonics	Emanem	
2001	Strung	Sublingual	
2002	Temperament	Emanem	
2002	Great Fences of Australia	Dynamo House	
2003	The People's Music	ReR	
2003	Fleisch	Saucerlike	
2004	Double Indemnity	Hermes Discorbie	
2011	Futch	Jazzwerkstatt Berlin	
2012	Rosin	ReR	
2013	Colophony	Creative Sources	
2015	Tuning Out	Emanem	
