= The Compass, Log and Lead =

Studio album by Fred Frith, Carla Kihlstedt and Stevie Wishart
- Released: 2006
- Recorded: October 2003
- Studio: New Improvised Recording, Oakland, California
- Genre: Experimental music, free improvisation
- Length: 43:25
- Label: Intakt (Switzerland)
- Producer: Intakt Records, Fredi Bosshard, Patrik Landolt

Fred Frith chronology
Eleventh Hour (2005)	The Compass, Log and Lead (2006)	Duo (Victoriaville) 2005 (2006)

The Compass, Log and Lead is a 2006 studio album of improvised acoustic experimental music by Fred Frith, Carla Kihlstedt and Stevie Wishart. It was recorded in October 2003 in Oakland, California, and released by Intakt Records in 2006.

In the CD liner notes, Frith described the collaboration on this album:

The music on this record is improvised. What we bring to each performance is who we are and all that we have learned so far ... For us, improvising is the sum of our personal musical histories intertwined, a place where we can meet on equal terms and discover things we never knew, or hear what we thought we knew in a new light. It's a conversation, an exchange. There are no rules, other than to listen well and act accordingly.

== Reception ==
Professional ratings
Review scores
Source	Rating
AllMusic	4/5 stars
All About Jazz	4/5 stars
DownBeat	3.5/5 stars

In a review at AllMusic, arwulf called The Compass, Log and Lead "an absorbing album of collectively improvised rituals" by Frith and the "exceptionally brilliant" Kihlstedt and Wishart. He lauded it for its "strikingly inspired subtlety, delicacy, and intimacy", and said it is one of the "most intriguing entries in [Frith's] entire discography".

Reviewing the album in the jazz and improvised music online magazine One Final Note, Daniel Spicer said Frith, Kihlstedt and Wishart's performances here are restrained as they test the limits of their acoustic stringed instruments, but he noted that the result is a "bewitching, lo-fi combination of folk and improv". Writing in All About Jazz Glenn Astarita described the trio's "homespun ... avant-garde stylizations" as "an organic gala with a bevy of abstracts and roots-derived melodies". He called the album's twelve pieces "mesmerizing" and said it is "recommended listening".

In a review of the album in DownBeat, Bill Shoemaker wrote that "[d]espite the absence of regional or ethnic markers", the album's free improvised music has "an oddly folkloric feel" about it and "the elemental power of traditional music". He called the drones from Wishart's "post-modernized" hurdy-gurdy "a stunning sound source". Clive Bell wrote in The Wire that "the communication between the [three improvisers] is so good it works like a dream." He said that the tracks "are wide open to folk music, in the way that Bartok integrated Hungarian traditions". Bell called the album "a modest record … but an important one, for its warmth and openmindedness". He added that if you are after "showboating and shock tactics you'll have to look elsewhere."

== Track listing ==
All music by Fred Frith, Carla Kihlstedt and Stevie Wishart.

No.	Title	Length
1.	"Time Comes Presto"	3:14
2.	"A Beautiful Thing to Forget / Får Ej Tåckas"	4:50
3.	"Look at Sky Go"	3:39
4.	"Dog-Eared"	2:04
5.	"I Am Buffalo Bill Today"	4:12
6.	"Initially This"	2:38
7.	"Postcard from the Back"	3:55
8.	"I Am Map"	3:31
9.	"Abstract Expressionism"	5:16
10.	"Dream as a Means"	3:15
11.	"Aller Retour"	4:13
12.	"Time Goes Largo"	2:45

Sources: AllMusic, Liner notes, Discogs.

== Personnel ==
- Fred Frith – acoustic guitar, Lowry organ, violin (track 4)
- Carla Kihlstedt – violin, nyckelharpa
- Stevie Wishart – hurdy-gurdy, electronics, violin (track 4)

Sources: Liner notes, Discogs.

=== Sound and artwork ===
- Recorded at New Improved Recording, Oakland, California, October 2003
  - Engineering by Myles Boisen and John Finkbeiner
- Mastering and final edit at Headless Buddha, Oakland, May 2004 and January 2005
  - Engineering by Myles Boisen
- Production by Intakt Records, Fredi Bosshard and Patrik Landolt
- Photography by Francesca Pfeffer
- Design by Fabrizio Gilardino
- Cover art by Carla Kihlstedt
- Liner notes by Fred Frith

Sources: Liner notes, Discogs.
