= Campaign for Drawing =

The Big Draw (formerly the Campaign for Drawing)
- Formation: 2000
- Founder: Guild of St George
- Registration no.: 1114811
- Location: The Big Draw, Electrician's Shop, Trinity Buoy Wharf, 64 Orchard Place London Borough of Hackney E14 0JY, UK
- Director: Kate Mason
- Website: www.thebigdraw.org

The Big Draw, formerly the Campaign for Drawing, is a British registered charity that promotes drawing and visual literacy. It was founded in 2000 by the Guild of St George, and is now an independent charity.

The Big Draw believes that drawing is a universal language that can unite people across generations, backgrounds and borders. It is inspired by the Victorian artist and writer, John Ruskin, whose mission was not to teach people how to draw, but how to see. An arts educational charity, the Campaign demonstrates that drawing is a life skill: an essential tool for learning, expression and invention. Its publications for teachers and other educators provide comprehensive evidence that drawing supports formal and informal learning.

The charity supports established and emerging artists through The John Ruskin Prize and exhibition, and regular events, awards and competitions.

The Big Draw manages collaborative research projects, campaigns and educational conferences on visual literacy, digital technology and STEAM (Science, Technology, Art, Maths, Science).

== The Big Draw Festival ==
The Big Draw charity is the founder and coordinator of The Big Draw Festival, which takes place each year in over 20 countries around the world.

Events often take place at notable venues throughout the UK including The British Museum, The National Gallery and Victoria and Albert Museum as well as schools, community centres, parks and village halls. The 2013 Big Draw highlight event offered visitors 20 activities in the new Queen Elizabeth Olympic Park. Previous launches were held at the Natural History Museum, V&A (twice), Trafalgar Square, St Pancras International Station, Welcome Collection and the British Library.

== Partnerships ==
The Big Draw receives no core funding. Previously, it has been sponsored by bodies as diverse as NESTA, Arts Council England (ACE), Crayola, Daler-Rowney, Esmée Fairbairn Foundation, Paul Hamlyn Foundation, Barbara Whatmore Charitable Trust, Financial Times, Heritage Lottery Fund, National Lottery, Persil, Puffin, Royal Academy of Engineering, Royal Institute of British Architects, Derwent and Cass Art.

== Patrons ==
- Quentin Blake CBE
- Lord Norman Foster
- David Hockney CH
- Andrew Marr
- Sir Roger Penrose OM
- Gerald Scarfe
- Posy Simmonds MBE
- Chris Riddell
- Narinder Sagoo
- Bob and Roberta Smith RA

== See also ==
- List of European art awards
