= Åke Blomström Award =

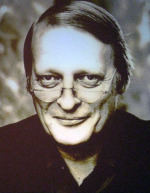
- Awarded for: Best radio documentary, judged in competition.
- Presented by: Participating organisations and associates.; The Selection Committee
- First award: 1986; 40 years ago
- No. of laureates: About 100 Prizes as of 2017
- Website: akeblomström.eu

The Åke Blomström Award (ABA) was established in 1986 as the "Åke Blomström Memorial Prize" in honour of Åke Blomström (31/12 1931–31/5 1985) for many years Head of Documentaries at Swedish Radio and deeply committed to the work of his young colleagues. It serves to promote the development of talented young radio documentary makers in the participating countries.

== The Idea behind the prize ==
Åke Blomström was always concerned about young radio talents, especially independent practitioners, who were at the beginning of their career as feature makers. This took practical form in three stages: a) discovering them b) furthering the careers of those with talent, c) finally, having them present their best works in competitions, thus giving them international recognition.

== The Award Process ==
The task of "discovering and promoting" has been carried out within the framework of the annual International Feature Conference. The task of "providing international recognition" has been carried out within the framework of the Prix Futura Berlin. The choice of winners has been carried out by a "Selection Committee", according to certain requirements, and has been financed by participating associates, from countries all around the world, for more than 30 years.

== International cooperation and financing ==
- 1986–1992: Swedish Radio (SR in Sweden) 30.000 SEK per year for six years.
- 1992–1994: Danish Broadcasting Corporation (DR in Denmark), Norwegian Broadcasting Corporation (NRK in Norway), Swedish Radio and the Finnish Broadcasting Company (Yle in Finland). Four grants of 7.500 SEK as in the past. In 1993 the Åke Blomström Memorial Prize (ABMP) at Prix Futura Berlin was financed by the competition itself.
- 1994–2000: Danish Broadcasting Corporation, Norwegian Broadcasting Corporation, Swedish Radio and Finnish Broadcasting Company provided 7.500 SEK each. "Belgian Radio and Television Broadcasts in Dutch" (BRTN in Belgium) provided an additional 1.500 DM and Radio Free Berlin (SFB in Germany) 2200 DM. This provided for 5 travel grants. In 1994 the ABMP at Prix Futura Berlin was again financed by the competition itself.
- 2001: Danish Broadcasting Corporation, Norwegian Broadcasting Corporation, Swedish Radio, Finnish Broadcasting Company, Flemish Radio and Television Broadcasting Organization (VRT in Belgium), and Radio Free Berlin are joined by Austrian Broadcasting Corporation (ORF in Austria) and Radio France (radiofrance in France). In addition the independent producer Gregory Whitehead from United States made a generous private contribution.
- 2005: Danish Broadcasting Corporation, Norwegian Broadcasting Corporation, Swedish Radio, Finnish Broadcasting Company, Berlin-Brandenburg Broadcasting (rbb in Germany), Austrian Broadcasting Corporation, Flemish Radio and Television Broadcasting Organization, People's University Radio (RVU in The Netherlands) and Public Service Broadcaster of the Republic of Ireland (RTÉ in the Republic of Ireland) makes an annual donation into a bank account held under the aegis of the European Broadcasting Union (EBU).
- 2007–2013: Danish Broadcasting Corporation, Norwegian Broadcasting Corporation, Swedish Radio, Finnish Broadcasting Company, Berlin-Brandenburg Broadcasting, Austrian Broadcasting Corporation, Flemish Radio and Television Broadcasting Organization, Public Service Broadcaster of the Republic of Ireland, and Croatian Radiotelevision (HRT in Croatia) contribute.
- 2014: A joint venture between 9 countries and 13 public radio stations: Danish Broadcasting Corporation, Norwegian Broadcasting Corporation, Swedish Radio, Finnish Broadcasting Company, Berlin-Brandenburg Broadcasting, "Germany cultural radio station" (DLR Kultur in Germany), "Southwest Broadcasting" (SWR in Germany), West German Broadcasting Cologne (WDR in Germany) and Northern German Broadcasting (NDR in Germany), Austrian Broadcasting Corporation, Flemish Radio and Television Broadcasting Organization, Croatian Radiotelevision, and Public Service Broadcaster of the Republic of Ireland.
