= Rik Rue =

- Also known as: Richard Banachowicz
- Born: Richard Banachowicz; 1950 (age 75–76); Sydney, New South Wales, Australia
- Occupation: Experimental musician
- Instruments: sound collage, soprano saxophone

Rik Rue (born Richard Banachowicz) is an Australian experimental musician, and sound artist, known for his audio collages in recordings and live performance.

== Biography ==
Born in Sydney in 1950 to Polish refugee parents, Rue began constructing sound collages on tape from the age of 15, later encouraged by Australian painter and collage artist Carl Plate. He studied part-time at the Slade School, Camden Art Centre and Royal College of Art in London.

He first performed on saxophone with a number of prominent Sydney improvisers including Serge Ermoll, Jon Rose and Louis Burdett before switching to live mixing of sampled and pre-recorded sound on audio cassette recorders including the TASCAM Portastudio, describing the relationship between the two instruments, 'The tape is improvised in a sense, by equalisation, adding timbres, adding pitch controls, the various combinations of mixing. All those areas give you a sort of phrasing not unlike saxophonists altering their embouchure, and I approach the tapes in this manner.'

After releasing material on the Fringe Benefit label, in 1983 he created his own label Pedestrian Tapes, releasing his own and works by Michael Sheridan, Jim Denley, Jo Truman, John Gillies, Ian Hartley, Ernie Althoff and others. In the 1980s he was a member of the group Mind/Body/Split with Jim Denley, Sherre de Lyse, Jamie Fielding, Graham Leake and Kimo Venonen, and in 1989 he co-founded the performance ensemble Machine for Making Sense with Chris Mann, Amanda Stewart, Jim Denley and Stevie Wishart, first performing at Ars Electronica Festival, Linz, Austria. Later he worked with performance group Gravity Feed on over 20 projects between 1994 and 2007 in Australia and Germany, Urban Theatre Projects, dancer Tess de Quincey, the group Social Interiors (with Shane Fahey and Julian Knowles), musicians David Moss, Eugene Chadbourne, Ikue Mori and released recordings on Extreme Records.

In 1995 his recordings were included in the exhibition Sound In Space: Adventures In Australian Sound Art at the Museum of Contemporary Art Australia (MCA), Sydney. The major sound work Things Change, Things Remain The Same commissioned by the Australian Broadcasting Commission, was exhibited as part of the major contemporary art exhibition Australian Perspecta 1997: Between Art and Nature. It has been described as an 'outback road-trip of the mind'. His video and sound work Fire and Water was shown at SNO Gallery Sydney in 2014. A number of Rue's early cassette recordings were re-released by Shame File Music from 2014. In 2018 the exhibition In-Formalism at the Casula Powerhouse, included a survey of his tape works.

Rue has multiple sclerosis and is now no longer active in performing or recording.

== Discography ==
- Louis Burdett, Jon Rose, Rik Rue, Towards a Relative Music, LP (Fringe Benefit Records, 1979)
- Dave Ellis, Serge Ermoll, Peter Kelly, Jon Rose, Rik Rue, Improvisations, LP (Fringe Benefit Records, 1979)
- Rik Rue, A Raise of an Eyebrow, cassette (Pedestrian Tapes, 1983)
- Fifi L' Amour & Rik Rue, Rue L'Amour, cassette (Pedestrian Tapes, 1984)
- Rik Rue, Dub for St.Rita, cassette (Pedestrian Tapes, 1984; Shame File Music, 2019)
- Rik Rue, Other Voices, cassette (Pedestrian Tapes/ Calypso Now, 1984)
- Eugene Chadbourne, David Moss, Jon Rose, Rik Rue, Country Music of Southeastern Australia, LP (RRRecords, 1984)
- Rik Rue, Multisonous Mottos, cassette (Pedestrian Tapes, 1985)
- Rik Rue, Water Works, cassette (NMA Publications, 1985)
- Shane Fahey & Rik Rue, Murmurs, cassette (Pedestrian Tapes, 1986, as download Shame File Music, 2014)
- Rik Rue, Two Short Adventures in Water, cassette (no label, 1986)
- Rik Rue, Bend An Ear, cassette (STI/Les Ballets Mécaniques, 1987)
- Rik Rue, Eur, cassette (Pedestrian Tapes, 1987)
- Rik Rue (as EUR), Heavy Handed, CDR (Cosmic Conspiracy Productions, 1990)
- Clay Caplice & Rik Rue, A Shift in Magnetic North, cassette (Pedestrian Tapes, 1990)
- Rik Rue, Onomatopoeia, cassette (Pedestrian Tapes, 1991)
- Rik Rue, The Pre Glasnost Tapes, cassette (Pedestrian Tapes, 1991, as download Shame File Music, 2014)
- Rik Rue, Sound Escapes, LP (RRRecords, 1991)
- Rik Rue, Songs for the End of Time, cassette (Pedestrian Tapes, 1993)
- Rik Rue, Voice Capades, cassette (Pedestrian Tapes, 1993 - reissued on CDR and online by Alias Frequencies, 2004)
- Rik Rue, Ocean Flows, CD (Tall Poppies Records, 1993)
- Jim Denley, Ikue Mori, Rik Rue, Amanda Stewart, David Watson, Bit-Part Actor, CD (Braille Records, 1996)
- Tony Buck & Rik Rue, Come Let's Build Ourselves A City, mini CD (Algen, 1996)
- Rik Rue, Sample/Shuffle/Interplay, CD (Extreme Records, 1999)
- Rik Rue, Environmentally Yours, Limited Edition CDR, signed by the artist (no label, 2004)
- Rik Rue, Recent and Not So Recent Collage Works, CD (no label, 2004)

Radiophonic Works

- Machine for Making Sense (Rik Rue, Amanda Stewart, Jim Denley, Chris Mann, Stevie Wishart), Silence is therefore the only possible means of communication - Karl Marx 1843, (Kunstradio 1995)
- Machine for Making Sense (Rik Rue, Amanda Stewart, Jim Denley, Stevie Wishart), The Twentieth Century Never Happened, (Kunstradio 2001)
- Rik Rue, Things Change, Things Remain The Same, (Australian Broadcasting Corporation, 1999)

Compilations

- Mauro Cavallaro, John Gillies, Stephen Harrop, Ian Hartley, Rik Rue, Genuine Tape Stories, cassette (Fringe Benefit Records, 1983)
- Bleak, Browning Mummery, Rik Rue, Severed Heads, Studio Testing, Lunokhod, double cassette (Cntmprr-ydtns, 1984)
- Frog Peak Collaboration Project, double CD (Frog Peak, 1997)
- Atherton, Franklin, Hewitt, Knowles, Payne, Rue, Social Interiors, Westerkamp, space, time & the roaring silence, CD (School of Contemporary Arts, UWS, 1999)
- Lloyd Barrett, Lucas Darklord, Buttress O'Kneel, Shannon O'Neill, Rik Rue, Radio Metamix, download (Alias Frequencies, 2009)

with Social Interiors

- Social Interiors (Shane Fahey & Rik Rue), Social Interiors, cassette (Pedestrian Tapes, 1985)
- Social Interiors (Shane Fahey & Rik Rue ), Intrusions into the Environment, cassette (Pedestrian Tapes, 1987)
- Social Interiors (Shane Fahey, Julian Knowles & Rik Rue), The World Behind You, CD (Extreme Records, 1995)
- Social Interiors (Shane Fahey, Julian Knowles & Rik Rue), Traces of Mercury, CD (Extreme Records, 1995)
- Social Interiors (Shane Fahey, Julian Knowles & Rik Rue) Spatial Circumference, CD (Endgame, 2006)

with Mind/Body/Split

- Mind/Body/Split, Mind/Body/Split, cassette (Pedestrian Tapes, 1986)
- Mind/Body/Split, If Its Not On Its Not On, LP (Splitrec, 1989)

with Machine for Making Sense

- Machine for Making Sense, On Second Thoughts, CD (Tall Poppies Records, 1994)
- Machine for Making Sense, Talk Is Cheap, CD (Splitrec, 1997)
- Machine for Making Sense, Dissect The Body, CD (Splitrec, 1998)
- Machine for Making Sense, Consciousness, CD (Splitrec, 1999)
- Machine for Making Sense, The Act Of Observation Becomes The Object Itself, CD (Rossbin, 2006)
