= Fors Clavigera =

1870s series of letters by John Ruskin

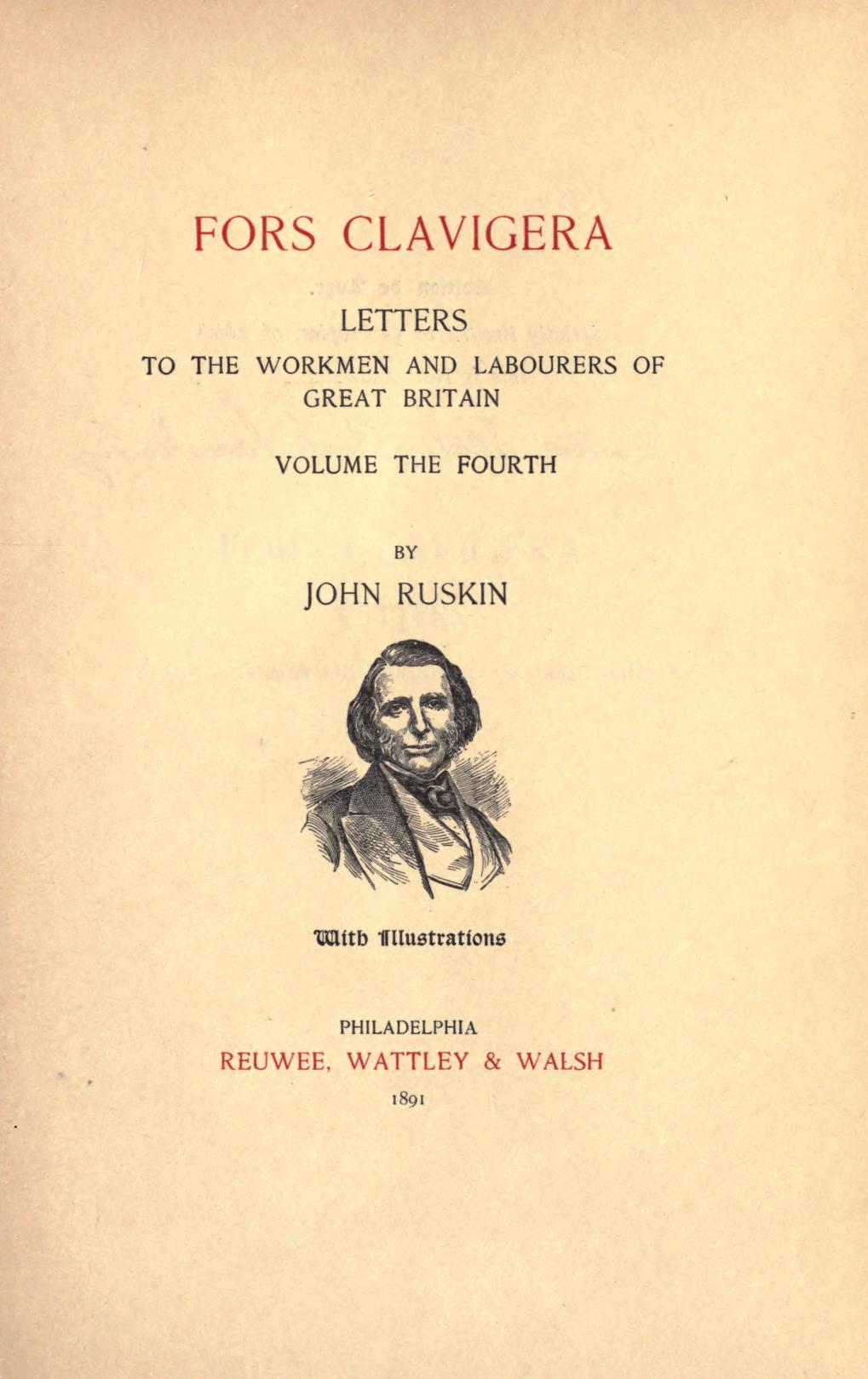
- Author: John Ruskin
- Language: English
- Published: 1871–1884
- Publication place: UK

Fors Clavigera: Letters to the Workmen and Labourers of Great Britain was the name given by John Ruskin to a series of letters addressed to British workmen during the 1870s. They were published in the form of pamphlets. The letters formed part of Ruskin's interest in moral intervention in the social issues of the day on the model of his mentor Thomas Carlyle.

== Title ==
The phrase "Fors Clavigera" was intended to designate three great powers which form human destiny. These were: Force, symbolised by the club (clava) of Hercules; Fortitude, symbolised by the key (clavis) of Ulysses; and Fortune, symbolised by the nail (clavus) of Lycurgus. "Gero means ‘I carry.’ (...) Clavigera may mean, therefore, either Club-bearer, Key-bearer, or Nail-bearer." These three powers (the "fortes") together represent the human talent and ability to choose the right moment and then to strike with energy. The concept is derived from Shakespeare's phrase "There is a tide in the affairs of men / Which, taken at the flood, leads on to fortune". Ruskin believed that the letters were inspired by the Third Fors: that he was striking out at the right moment to influence social change.

== Content ==
The letters of Fors Clavigera were written on a variety of topics that Ruskin believed would help to communicate his moral and social vision as expressed in his 1860 book Unto This Last. He was principally concerned to develop a vision of moral value in sincere labour. Phillip Mallett called them "in effect the resumption of the concerns of Carlyle's Past and Present in another form." Ruskin himself wrote in one letter that his work was done with Carlyle as the only man in England "to whom I can look for steady guidance."

== Libel case ==
It was in Fors Clavigera that Ruskin published his attack on the paintings of James McNeill Whistler exhibited at the Grosvenor Gallery in 1877. He attacked them as the epitome of capitalist production in art, created with minimum effort for maximum output. One of the most powerful sentences was, "I have seen, and heard, much of Cockney impudence before now; but never expected to hear a coxcomb ask two hundred guineas for flinging a pot of paint in the public's face." Ruskin's abusive language led Whistler to sue for libel. Whistler won the case, but only got one farthing in damages. Ruskin withdrew from art criticism for a period following the case.
