= Ruskin Gallery =

Gallery in Sheffield, England

The Ruskin Gallery is a gallery within the Millennium Galleries in Sheffield, England.

It houses a collection of minerals, paintings, ornithological prints, drawings, manuscripts and architectural plaster casts assembled by John Ruskin.

It first opened in 1875, under the name Museum of St George, in a cottage in Walkley. It 1890, it was relocated to Meersbrook Hall.
