= Chris Mann (composer) =

Australian composer, poet and performer

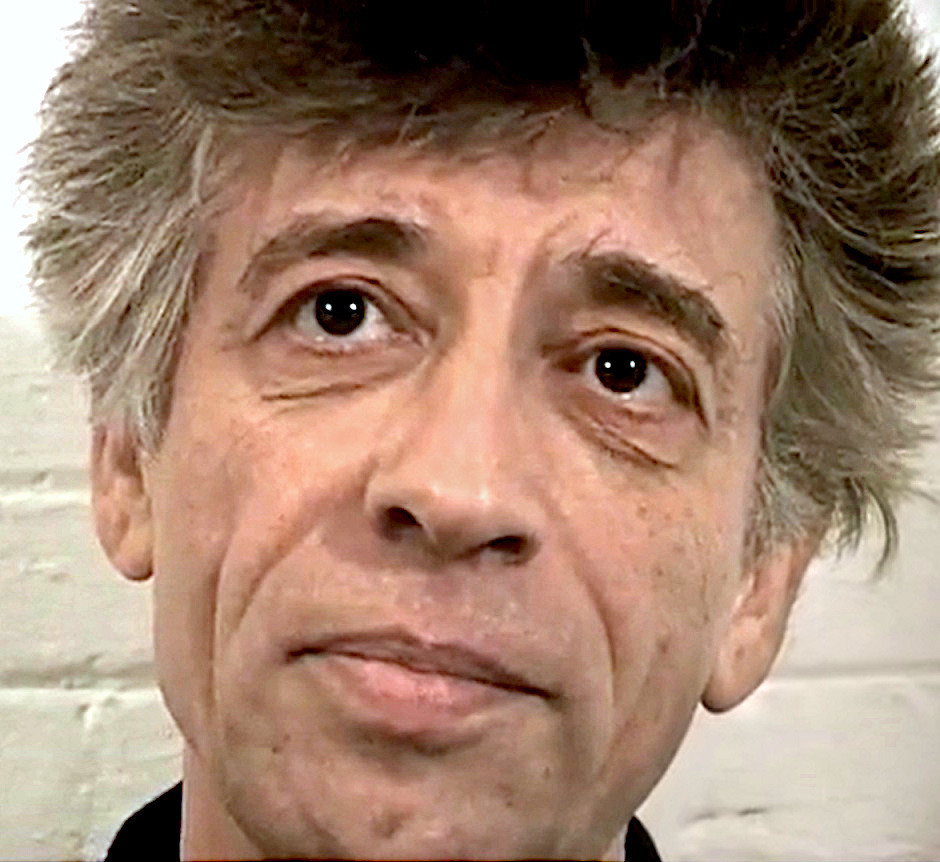
Chris Mann in Speaking Portraits

Chris Mann (March 9, 1949, Australia – September 12, 2018, New York City) was an Australian composer, poet and performer specializing in the emerging field of compositional linguistics, coined by Kenneth Gaburo and described by Mann as "the mechanism whereby you understand what I'm saying better than I do". He was, in the last 2 decades of his life, based in New York City.

Mann studied Chinese and linguistics at the University of Melbourne, and his interest in language, systems, and philosophy is evident in his work. Mann founded the New Music Centre in 1972 and taught at the State College of Victoria in the mid-1970s. He then left teaching to work on research projects involving cultural ideas of information theory and has been recognized by UNESCO for his work in that field.

Mann moved to New York in the 1980s and was an associate of American composers John Cage and Kenneth Gaburo. He performed text in collaboration with artists such as Thomas Buckner, David Dunn, Annea Lockwood, Larry Polansky, and Robert Rauschenberg.

Mann recorded with the ensemble Machine For Making Sense with Amanda Stewart, Rik Rue and others, Chris Mann and the Impediments (with two backup singers and Mann reading a text simultaneously while only being able to hear one another), and Chris Mann and The Use. His piece The Plato Songs, a collaboration with Holland Hopson and R. Luke DuBois, features realtime spectral analysis and parsing of the voice into multiple channels based on phonemes. Mann has also participated in the 60x60 project.

Mann taught in the Media Studies Graduate program at The New School. He died in September 2018 after a recurrence of cancer. He is survived by his wife and two children.

== Articles and reviews ==
Artist Chris Mann to vocalize his new work to St. Cloud by Tim Post, Minnesota Public Radio 1 April 2005

== Publications ==
- Words & Classes, Outback Press, Melbourne 1978.
- doin 2s, phon'm, Melbourne 1982 and Artelec, Paris 1983.
- Word for word, Christine, New York 1983.
- Subjective beats metaphor, NMA, Melbourne 1985.
- LA DE DA, collective effort, Melbourne 1985.
- The Rationales, NMA/post neo, Melbourne 1986.
- da-dum, Glass Box/WA, Melbourne 1987.
- of course, collective effort, Melbourne 1988.
- Tuesday, collective effort, Melbourne 1989.
- Birth of Peace, NMA, Melbourne 1990.
- 38'37" A Machine for Making Sense, NMA, Melbourne 1990.
- Chris Mann and Grammar, Lingua, Iowa City 1991.
- On second thoughts, Tall Poppies, Sydney 1994 and OO Discs, New York 1994.
- Chris Mann and the Impediments, OO Discs, New York 1995.
- 62 Composers on Chris Mann, Frog Peak, Hanover 1997.
- Talk is cheap, split, Sydney 1997.
- Working hypothesis, Station Hill, Barrytown 1998.
- Consciousness, split, Sydney 1999.
- chris mann and the use, Lovely Music, Ltd. CD 3091, 2002
- Of Course (newsprint); The Rationales (pad, from NMA Publications);
- Tuesday (pamphlet);
- "I got ten bucks says Barrabas had a dad. . ." (ribbon);
- "fee fie form odds is on. . ."(postcard)
- Tablecloth.
- Word for Word.
- Chris Mann and Grammar. (Lingua Press).
- Frog Peak Anthology. Writings by Harrison, Mann, Wendt, and others, edited by Carter Scholz. Frog Peak Publication.
- Working Hypothesis.
- How Do You Know That. Guppy Vol. I, No. 3: Text. .
- 010011.net (Machine for Making Sense) Jewish Museum, New York 2013. website

== Discography ==
- Frog Peak Collaborations Project
- 60x60 (2006–2007)
- Talking about Healesville. Man04.
- The Birth of Peace. Multimedia work for goldfish-controlled computers and poets; Comes with book, ring and plastic fish.
