= Police abolition =

Political movement

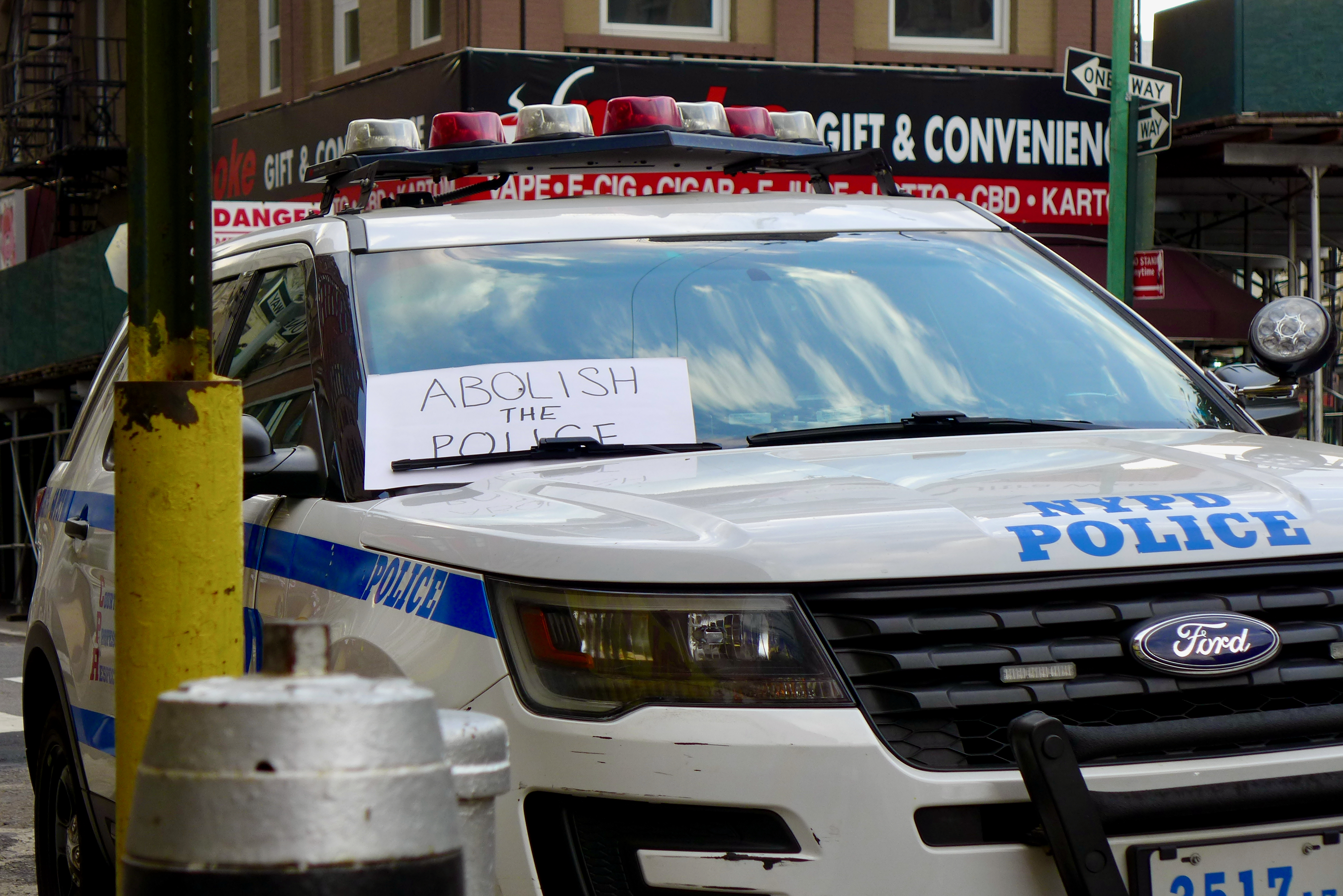
"Abolish the police" sign on an NYPD Ford Police Interceptor Utility during the George Floyd protests

Police abolitionism is a left-wing political movement that seeks to replace the policing system with other systems of public safety. Police abolitionists believe that policing, as a system, is inherently flawed and cannot be reformed—a view that rejects the ideology of reformists. While reformists seek to address the ways in which policing occurs, abolitionists seek to transform policing altogether through a process of disbanding, disempowering, and disarming the police. Abolitionists argue that the institution of policing is deeply rooted in a history of white supremacy and settler colonialism and that it is inseparable from a pre-existing racial capitalist order, and therefore believe a reformist approach to policing will always fail.

Police abolition is a process that requires communities to create alternatives to policing, such as mobile crisis teams and community accountability. This process involves the deconstruction of the preconceived understandings of policing and resisting co-option by reformists. It also involves engaging in and supporting practices that reduce police power and legitimacy, such as defunding the police.

In the George Floyd protests, Black Lives Matter and other activists used the phrase "defund the police". The defunding movement advocates reducing police department budgets or the delegation of certain police responsibilities to other organizations. Some activists have proposed the diversion of police funds to social services, such as youth or housing services. Despite exceptions, advocates for defunding the police rarely call for outright abolition of police.

While there is academic literature that advocates for police abolition, police abolition has also been criticized by sociologists, criminologists, journalists, and politicians.

== History ==
The United States established its first militarized police force in Pennsylvania in 1905, directly influenced by American warfare which was conducted by the Philippine Constabulary. The Pennsylvania State Police were created by Governor Samuel W. Pennypacker, who intended for the force to serve as a means "to crush disorders, whether industrial or otherwise, which arose in the foreigner-filled districts of the state." Virtually all of the officers were drawn from the U.S. military, many coming directly from the Constabulary. While the state police force was "supposedly statewide" in name, "the force was actually deployed in four troops to cover the mining districts", which were highly populated by "foreigners". Nearly all of the troopers were "American born and their motto was 'One American can lick a hundred foreigners,'" as recorded by Thomas Reppetto. They referred to themselves as the Black Hussars and were referred to colloquially as "Cossacks."

As early as 1906, the state police were already stirring resentment by shooting labor strikers and escaping accountability. In 1906, troopers shot twenty strikers in Mount Carmel. Although the lieutenant in command was arrested for assault and battery, "the state exonerated him and his men of all charges." Governor Pennypacker expressed support, stating that the troopers had "established a reputation which has gone all over the Country... with the result that the labor difficulties in the anthracite coal region entirely disappeared." The state police were commonly called in to suppress labor strike activity, were used as a weapon of the elite class in Pennsylvania, and regularly escaped repercussions for their actions. As stated by Jesse Garwood, "A [state] policeman can arrest anybody, anytime." The United Mine Workers "pressed for the abolition of this 'Cossack' force" but retreated during World War I when more transformative labor organizing from the Industrial Workers of the World (IWW) arose in the region. Although they had supported abolition for nearly a decade, the United Mine Workers were satisfied when a raid was conducted on an IWW meeting in 1916 in Old Forge. All 262 people present were arrested, and "after the release of some undercover informants, the rest were sentenced to thirty days."

Immigration to the United States heavily declined in 1914, which resulted in some mining communities becoming more Americanized. As a result, "Pennsylvania's industrial belt was no longer a land of cultural deviance, but just another rural slum." A wider police abolitionist movement had emerged as a response to the violence inflicted by the public police and the private coal and iron police during a series of armed labor strikes and conflicts known as the Coal Wars (1890–1930). Throughout the period, there were numerous reports of miners being severely beaten and murdered by the public and private police. State police fired indiscriminately into tent cities, which resulted in the "killing or wounding of women and children", and numerous sexual assault and rapes committed by officers became common. After witnessing the beating of a 70-year-old citizen, American trade unionist and member of the Pennsylvania House of Representatives James H. Maurer proposed legislation to abolish the public Pennsylvania State Police.

In 1928, the ACLU issued a pamphlet entitled "The Shame of Pennsylvania", declaring that thousands of public and private police had been "allowed to abuse their power without inquiry or punishment" yet ultimately concluded that, without a "fearless governor", abolishing the police was "not conceivable." In 1929, the murder of Polish émigré miner John Barcoski eventually resulted in the abolishment of Pennsylvania's private anti-labor Coal and Iron Police system in 1931. Barcoski was beaten to death by three officers employed by American banker Richard Beaty Mellon's Pittsburgh Coal Company. James Renshaw Cox, who worked with a coalition of civic, labor, and religious leaders to abolish the private police, referred to the agency as "tyranny by the wealthy industrial people."

== Ideology ==
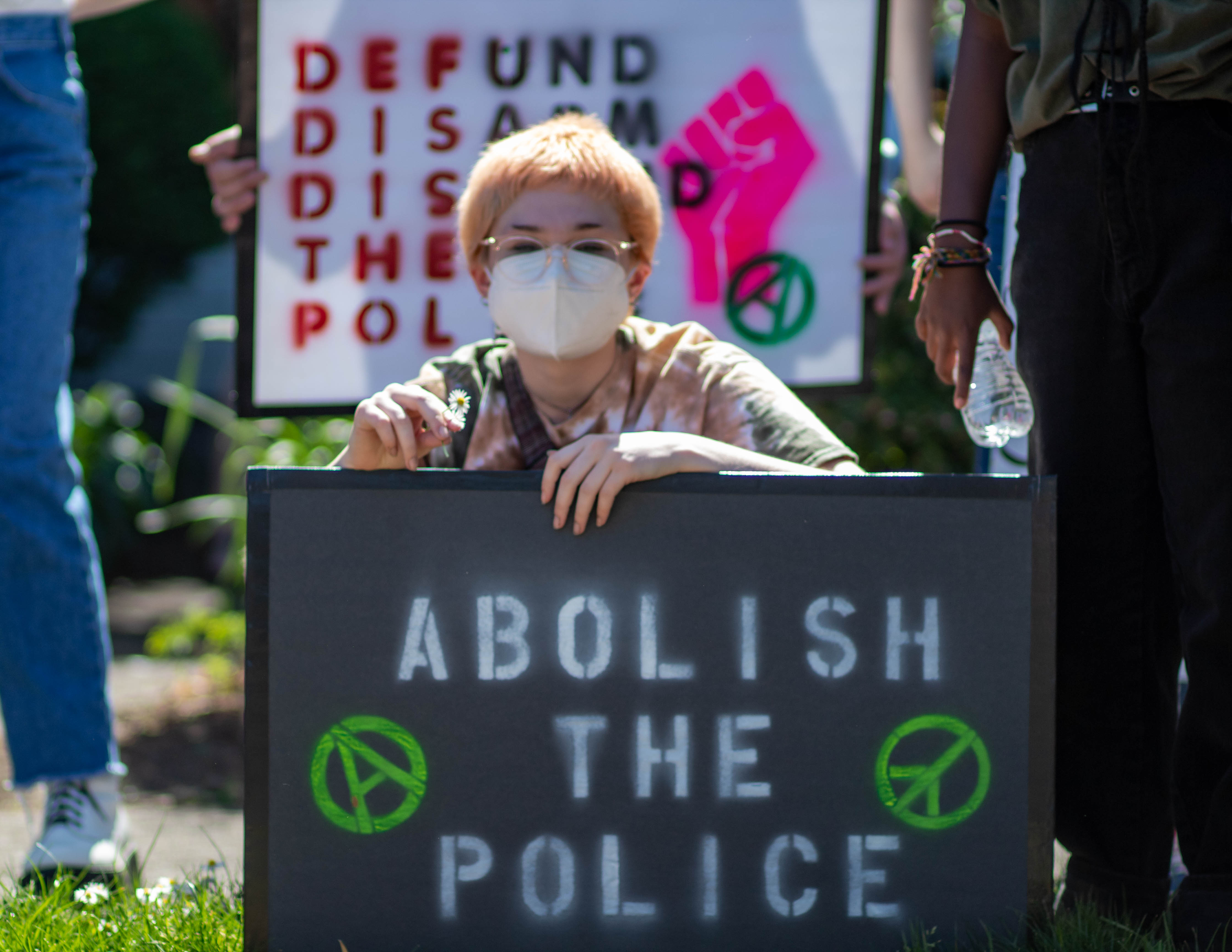
A protester calling to abolish the police during the Daunte Wright protests in Eugene, Oregon, in 2021. The protester's sign features the anarchist circle-A and peace symbol.

Police abolition is founded on the idea that police, as they exist in society, are harmful to the people and must therefore be abolished. Abolitionists push back against reformists who, as David Correia and Tyler Wall describe, "refuse to even consider that a world without police and private property might actually be a safer and more democratic world than the one we know today [and] never get tired of telling poor communities, routinely terrorized by police, to simply be patient, follow police orders, and work hard to escape the ghetto." Correia and Wall write that "whether in Detroit in 1967 or Ferguson in 2014, insurgent movements of poor Black and Brown people know that police reform always leads to more criminalization, harassment, arrest, and police killing in their communities."

Abolitionists argue that policing in the United States is rooted in colonialism and slavery and therefore cannot be reformed. As summarized by Mahesh Nalla and Graeme Newman: "Many policing problems plagued the new cities of America. They included controlling certain classes, including slaves and Indians; maintaining order; regulating specialized functions such as selling in the market, delivering goods, making bread, packing goods for export; maintaining health and sanitation; ensuring the orderly use of the streets by vehicles; controlling liquor; controlling gambling and vice; controlling weapons; managing pests and other animals." Early policing in America had little to do with crime control and was performed by groups of "volunteer citizens who served on slave patrols or night watches", as recorded by Victor Kappeler and Larry Gaines. Such slave patrols, for the purpose of keeping slaves from rebelling or escaping, had the power to monitor and inspect slave populations for signs of dissent as well as to watch for and apprehend traveling escaped slaves. Modern police organizations in the United States were developed from these early slave patrols and night watches, using tactics such as enforcement of vagrancy and voting restrictions laws to "[force] newly freed blacks into subservient economic and political roles" after the formal abolition of slavery. An example were the New England settlers who appointed Indian constables to police Native Americans, and the Province of Carolina that developed "the nation's first slave patrol", organized groups that would go on to exist in Southern and Northern states, in 1704.

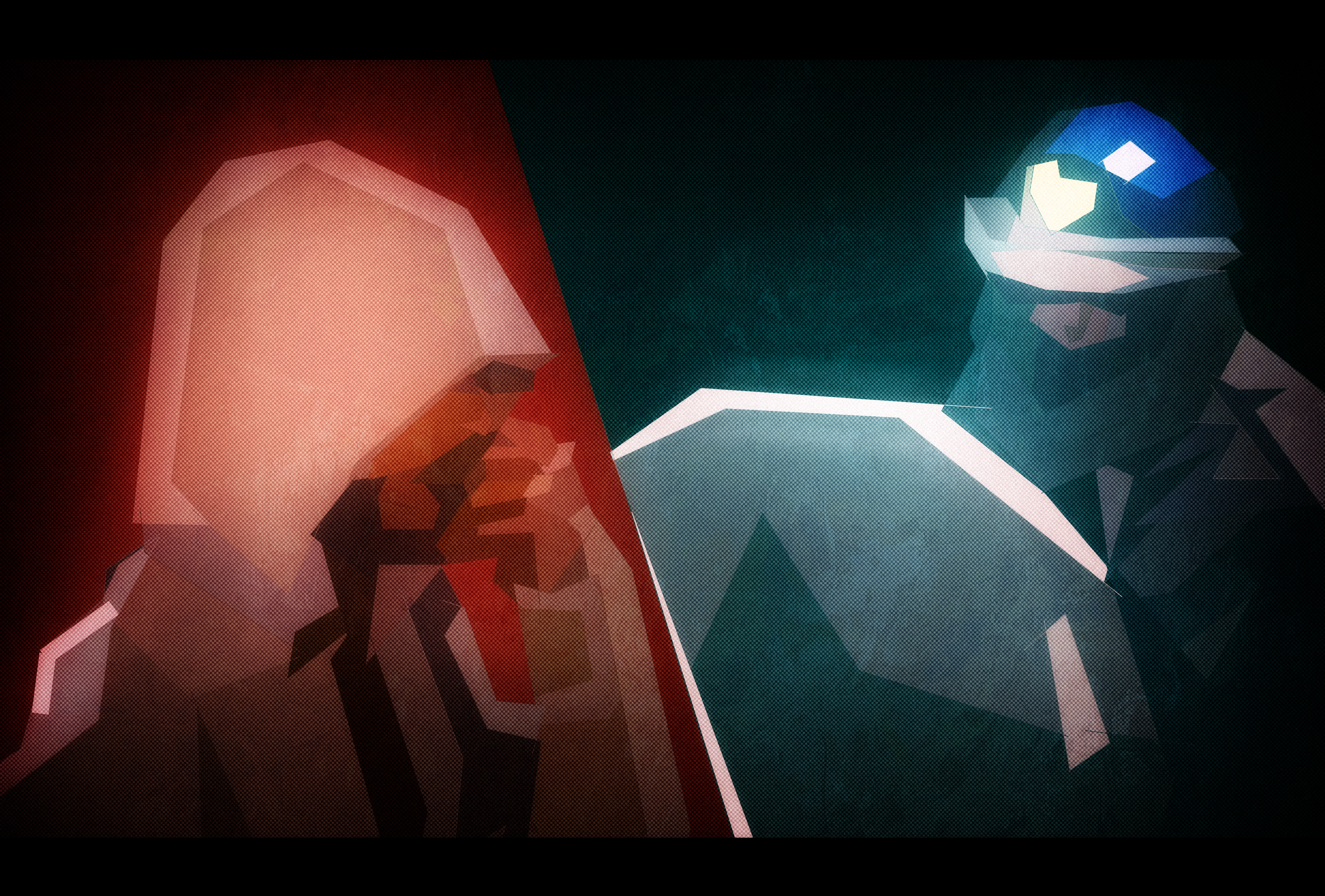
Anarchist anti-police art

Abolitionists argue that increased budgets for police officers do not generally go towards fighting violence and preserving community safety but instead go towards surveilling the public and criminalizing civilians, such as drugs, traffic, minor property offenses, debt collection, evictions, controlling unhoused people, and mental health calls, servicing those with political or economic power. Abolitionists, such as cultural critic Stacy Lee Kong, argue that the Robb Elementary School shooting exposed how many community safety functions of policing are in fact myths, and that the police exist instead to protect the interests of power and property.

Even abolitionists consider it "not a definitive end, because police and prisons lie at the heart of the capitalist state, which is always evolving, adapting, and reconstituting itself in response to resistance and insurgency." As stated by Luis Fernandez, professor of criminology, "asking the question 'what are alternatives to policing?' is to ask the question 'what are alternatives to capitalism?'" Fernandez identifies that "the role of the police is to maintain the capitalist social order, to maintain the social order so that those particular people who have power can do their business with the least amount of disruption ... possible." From this perspective, abolition of the police in the United States is inherently intertwined with undoing the racial capitalist order. As stated by Joshua Briond for Hampton Institute, "Black death is a necessity of racial capitalism and the institutions (such as policing and prisons) that exist to uphold it." As a result, Briond concludes that "the only realistic solution to a reality in which anti-Black terror, violence, and death is an inevitability to the functionality of a system, is abolition."

== Abolition as a process ==
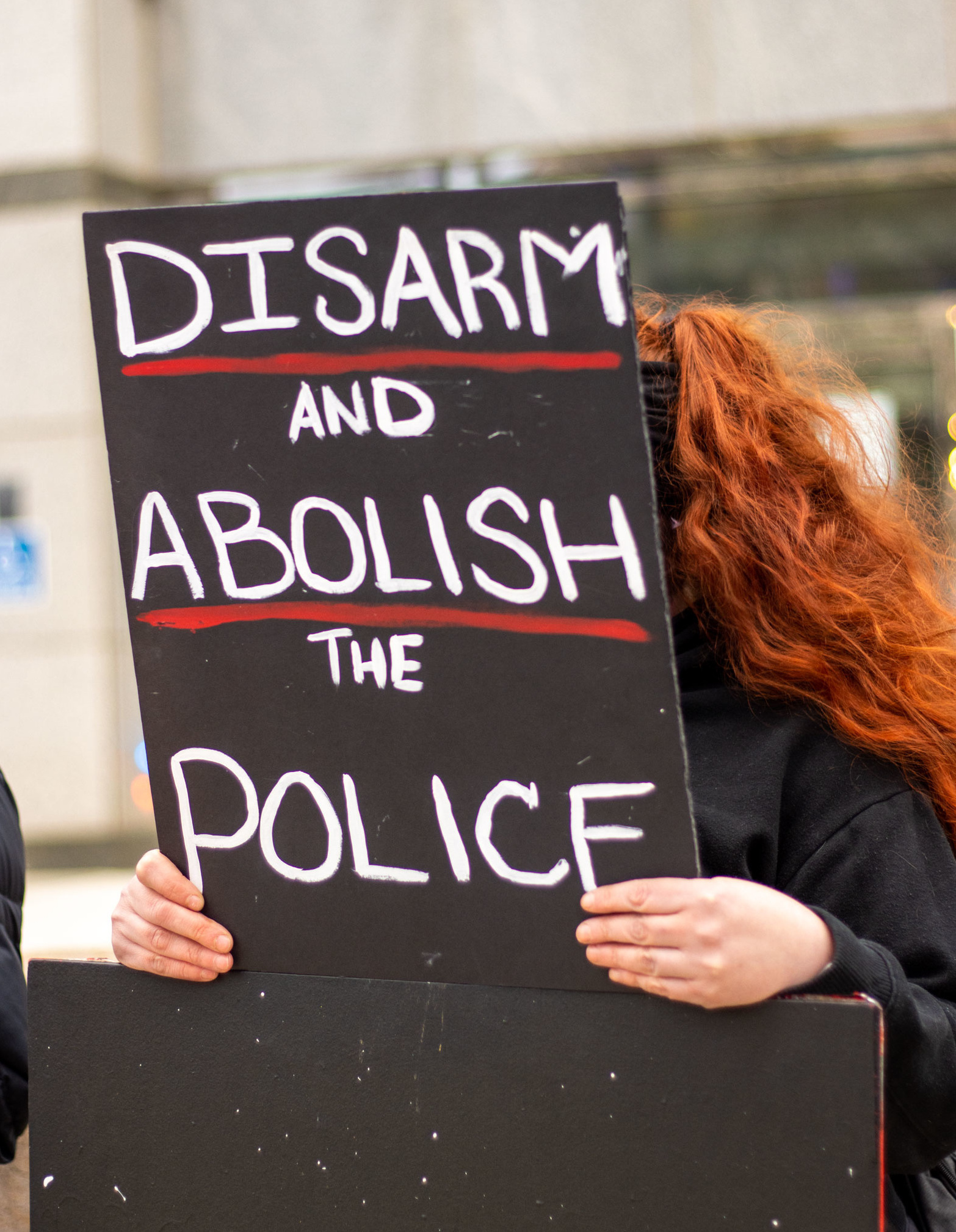
A person protesting the killing of Ma'Khia Bryant calling to disarm and abolish the police. Disarmament is one of several elements of a process that police abolitionists believe will ultimately accomplish their goal.

Police abolitionists see abolition as a process of disbanding, disempowering, and disarming the police in the transition to a society without police. This may take several forms for abolitionists, such as imagining alternatives to policing, directly challenging the legitimacy and roles of policing, resisting liberal attempts to co-opt, incorporate, or reconcile the uncompromising objective to abolish the police, and engaging in practices which undermine the authority and power of the police, such as defunding the police. As stated by academic Alex S. Vitale, police abolition is a process, rather than a singular event:

Well, I'm certainly not talking about any kind of scenario where tomorrow someone just flips a switch and there are no police. What I'm talking about is the systematic questioning of the specific roles that police currently undertake, and attempting to develop evidence-based alternatives so that we can dial back our reliance on them. And my feeling is that this encompasses actually the vast majority of what police do. We have better alternatives for them. Even if you take something like burglary — a huge amount of burglary activity is driven by drug use. And we need to completely rethink our approach to drugs so that property crime isn't the primary way that people access drugs. We don't have any part of this country that has high-quality medical drug treatment on demand. But we have policing on demand everywhere. And it's not working.

=== Creating alternatives ===
Briond states that "the lack of political imagination, beyond the electoral strategy and reformism, and the inability to envision a world, or even country, devoid of police and prisons is rooted in (anti-Black), racialized colonial logics of the biologically determined criminal, slave, and savage." In opposition to the position that police abolition is inconceivable, abolitionists support creating alternatives to policing. Activist Tourmaline references Andrea Ritchie to explain how "people act with abolitionist politics all the time, without actually knowing it." Ritchie presented the following example to illustrate this point: "You and your friend are at a bar. Your friend drove there. Your friend wants to drive home. Are you gonna call the cops or are you going to say 'no, I'll drive you home; I'll call a cab; I will take your keys'?" Tourmaline states that this is an example of "abolition at work", since "people are not constantly calling the cops on their friends to prevent them from drunk driving; people are finding unique and creative ways to get their friends from not driving while they're drunk."

In response, lawyer and activist Dean Spade states that "it seems like a big part of an example like that is the difference between how we feel about somebody we know—like, you're about to commit a crime, you're about to get in a car and drive drunk, but it never occurs to me that I should call the cops on you, because I don't see you as disposable, I know you—versus, [a scenario where] there's strangers on the subway and somebody's doing something that someone doesn't like and instead of figuring out what's going on or [questioning] can this be stopped, can this be less harmful, or can people get taken care of, there's a kind of immediate" response to make it "into a police problem." Spade says that this occurs because of the ways in which "people are alienated from one another in our culture" which has made it socially "not okay" to "connect and try to figure out how to solve the problem" together.

In response, Rachel Herzing suggests that we learn from people who have developed and proposed alternative strategies which rely on community development, networking and negotiation, group self-defense learning, workbooks and other materials which present alternatives for people who are unsure of what alternatives may exist, citing Fumbling Towards Repair by Mariame Kaba and Shira Hassan and Beyond Survival: Strategies and Stories from the Transformative Justice Movement, edited by Ejeris Dixon and Leah Lakshmi.

=== Delegitimizing the police ===
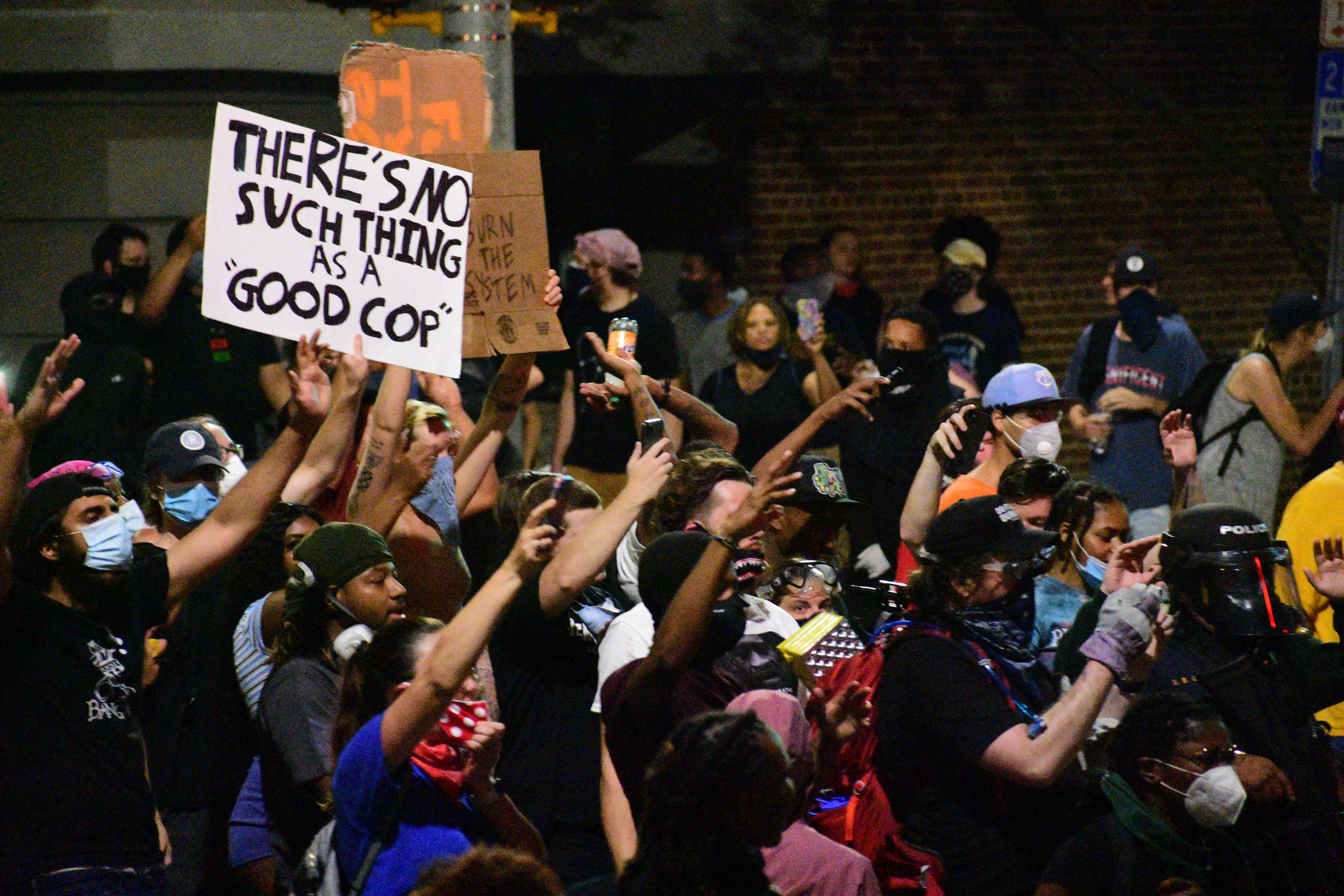
Protests in Raleigh, North Carolina on May 30, 2020

Abolitionists argue that delegitimizing the police as an institution of society and deconstructing the logic of policing are necessary towards actualizing police abolition. Megan McDowell and Luis Fernandez state that "by attacking the police as an institution, by challenging its very right to exist, the contemporary abolitionist movement contains the potential to radically transform society."

Dean Spade states that "clearly US policing has been having a major legitimacy crisis because of the Black Lives Matter movement." However, Spade cites Ruth Wilson Gilmore and Craig Gilmore's article "Beyond Bratton" in Policing the Planet in order to express how legitimacy crises historically have often actually resulted in the expansion of policing: "In the U.S., after the crisis in the 1960s and 70s that was provoked by the Black Panther Party, the Young Lords, and so many different anti-racist and anti-colonial movements calling out the police and more people seeing police violence and seeing the police as racist, the police just did a lot of new PR moves, like they expanded police to have police be homeless outreach workers and to have police go into every classroom in the United States and do a drug abuse education program called D.A.R.E." As a result, Spade concludes that "the idea that just because we provoke a [legitimacy] crisis we'll get a reduction or elimination is something we have to really question."

=== Opposition to reform ===
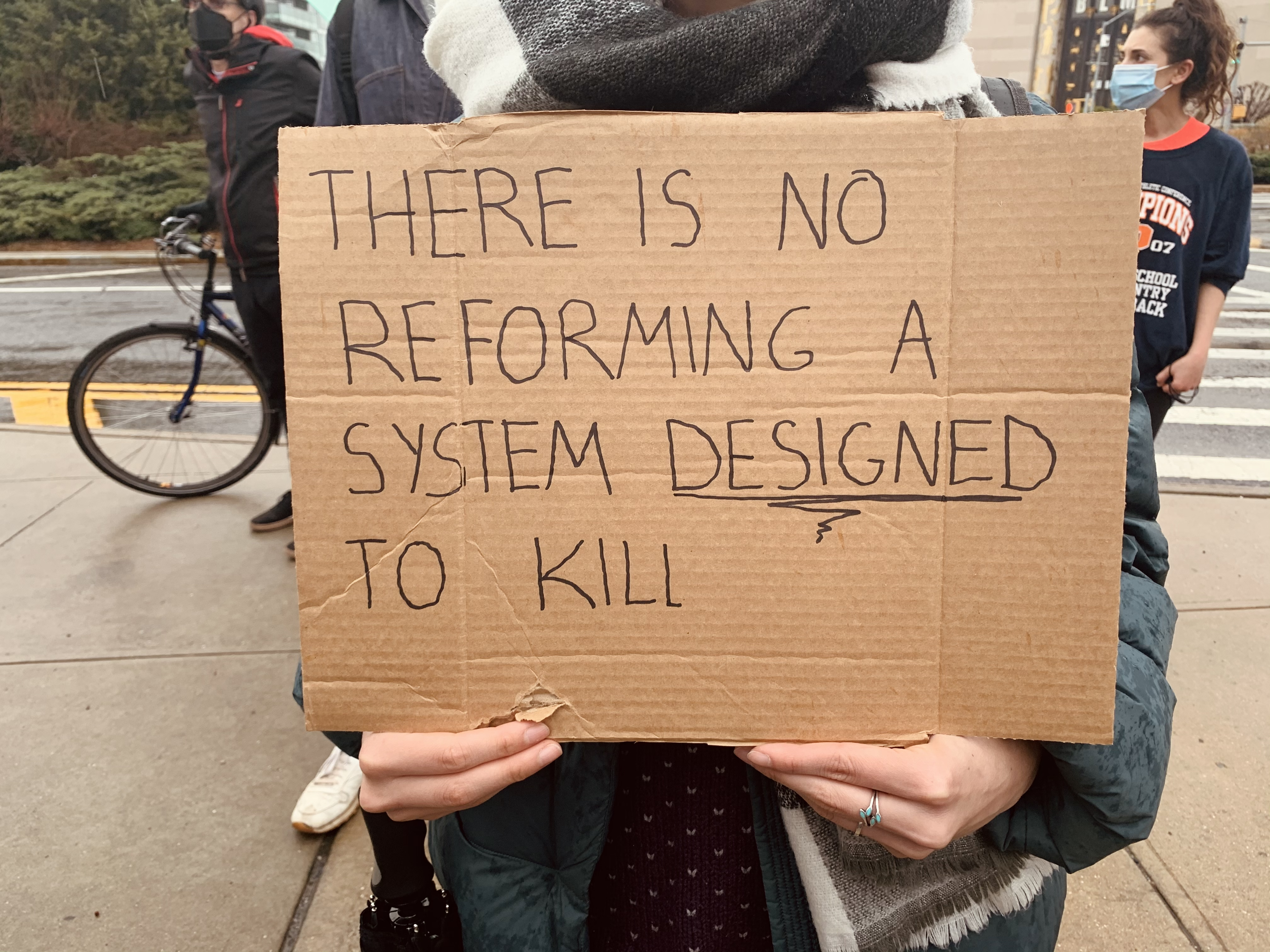
Many supporters of police abolition believe that police reform efforts are inherently flawed, and as such work to avoid compromising with less radical positions than abolition outright.

Abolitionists say calls for reform are attempts to co-opt abolition movements by proposing reforms which actually function to protect existing power structures. Tourmaline argues that this process of expecting the state to reduce harm and violence through increasing policing is embedded within the state's attempts to maintain its own legitimacy and power: "the logic of the state is constantly demanding us to think of ways to increase policing as a way to decrease harm and violence." Megan McDowell and Luis Fernandez state that an abolitionist praxis which "adopts uncompromising positions that resist liberal attempts at co-optation, incorporation, and/or reconciliation" should be adopted and amplified as a result.

The Ferguson unrest reform proposal of body cameras for police has been cited as an example of a reformist approach to policing which worked to strengthen police power and build wealth for the less than lethal weapons industry while failing to provide material relief to those impacted by police violence. Dean Spade argues that "the goal of those kinds of reforms is to demobilize us, to tell us 'your problem has been solved' ... and that is so important for us to deeply resist."

Mariame Kaba argues that reform will always be a failed project when it comes to police, because police have the power to execute state power without any limitations: "How are we going to reform an institution that basically has the ability to decide whether or not to use violence in any conceivable situation and is sanctioned by the state to do so?" Kaba points to examples which illustrate how police are not accountable to the law, but engage in the work of maintaining order rather than in enforcing the law.

=== Divest and invest ===
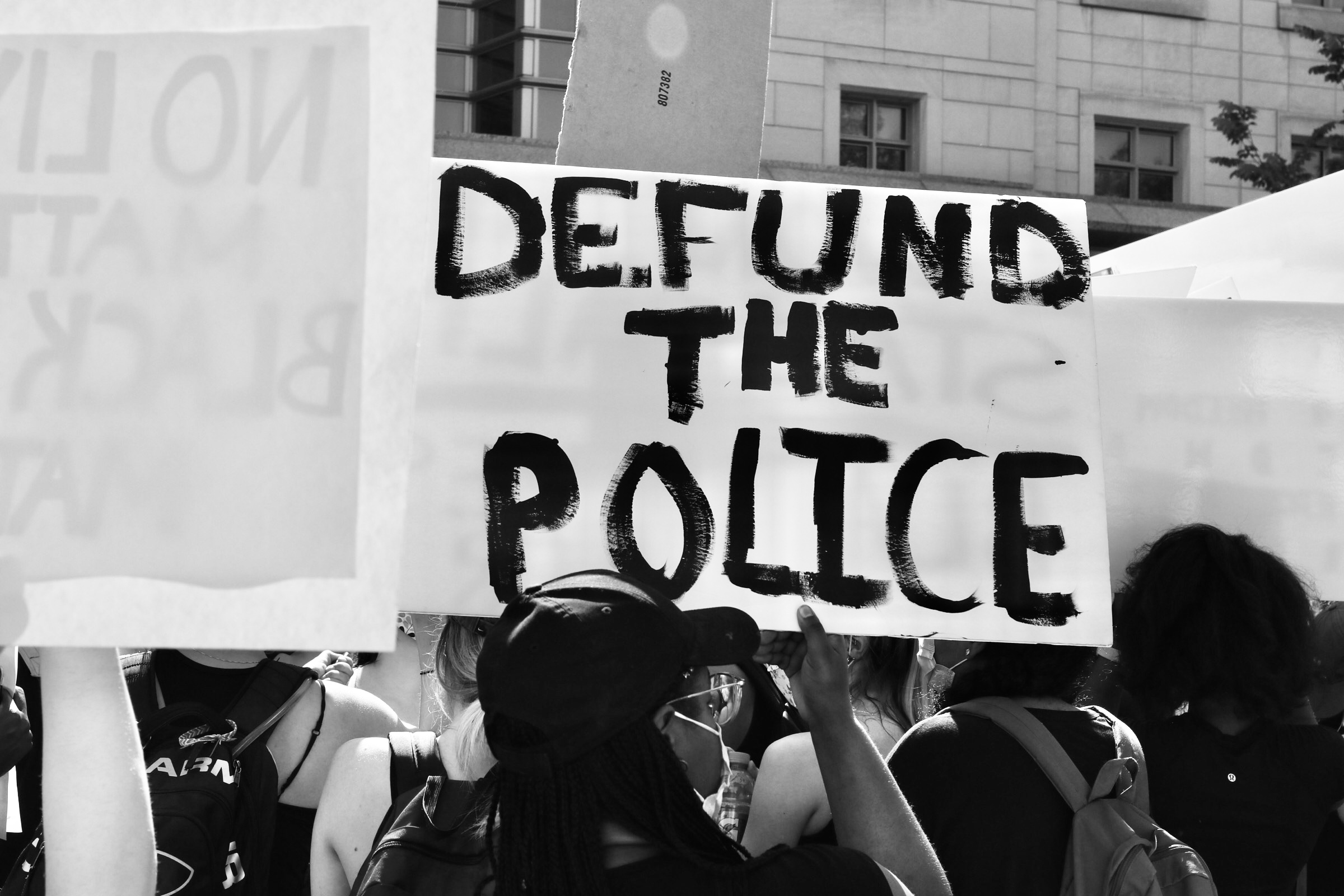
A demonstrator at a June 2020 George Floyd protest holds up a sign calling for defunding the police, a possible step in police abolition.

Defunding the police can be considered as a step towards abolition, by using funds allocated to police to invest in community initiatives intended to reduce crime and therefore the need for policing over time until the institution is fully abolished. Such initiatives could include social workers, mental health therapy, domestic abuse centres, drug counselling, and low cost housing. For instance, in Oakland, California, the police budget is over 40% of the city's discretionary spending. In many US cities, the police department is the largest single budget item.

Defunding the police frees up funds to invest in community initiatives intended to reduce crime and therefore the need for policing. Activist and advocacy groups like Movement 4 Black Lives call for "divest/invest" programs to divert police budgets into programs that have been proven to reduce crime. According to Patrisse Cullors, co-founder of Black Lives Matter, "We're ready to chip away at the line items inside of a police budget that really are nonsensical. Police should not be in charge of mental health crises. They should not be in charge of dealing with homelessness. They should not be in charge of 'supporting' people with drug dependency and addiction. Those are three line items which we can cut out of the police budget and then put that back into health care." In Eugene, Oregon, a nonprofit mobile crisis intervention program called CAHOOTS has handled mental health calls since 1989 and is often cited as a model for an alternative to police handling mental health calls. In 2019 CAHOOTS responded to 20% of Eugene's 911 calls on a budget of $2 million.

In June 2020, the 2012 disbanding of the Camden, New Jersey police department and replacement with a new one under county control was referred to as an example of abolishing the police by some media outlets. In 2012, Camden was considered "the most dangerous city in the United States", and the city had numerous problems with police corruption and many instances in which police would plant drugs on citizens. The department's disbanding and replacement allowed for funds to be reallocated to community-building initiatives. The new department had more officers, but their roles were reframed to be community-oriented and focused on de-escalating violence. A seven-year study showed that violent crime dropped 42% and the crime rate dropped from 79 per 1,000 to 44 per 1,000. Camden dropped down the list of most dangerous cities in the U.S. to tenth. Calls have increased to disband municipal and county police agencies in favor of standardized policing state-wide.

== Outside the United States ==
=== Canada ===
On April 12, 2020, following the shootings of Eisha Hudson and Jason Collins by the Winnipeg Police Service, James Wilt published an article in Canadian Dimension, arguing that policing was increasing the criminalization of Indigenous Canadians and of the homeless, and that "an institution designed to displace, dispossess, and break apart families and communities in the interests of capital cannot provide 'justice.'" Wilt noted how much budget goes to policing and called for the Winnipeg Police to be disbanded and their budget spent on social services.

=== Hong Kong ===
External image
- "Disband the police" (解散警隊) and "memorial day" (國殤) sign, photographed in January 2020

During the 2019–2020 Hong Kong protests, the abolition of the police was one of the requests by protestors. The slogan "Disband the Police Force immediately" (解散警隊，刻不容緩) appeared in many areas during the protest.

== Contemporary responses ==
=== Social scientists ===
According to Princeton University sociologist Patrick Sharkey, the best scientific evidence available shows that police are effective in reducing violence, while there is also a growing body of evidence that community organizations can play a central role in reducing violence. In an interview with Vox, Sharkey stated aggressive policing and mass incarceration were effective at reducing violence but said these methods have had "staggering costs", and advocated a model focused primarily on residents and local organizations rather than police.

Criminologists Justin Nix and Scott Wolfe state in The Washington Post, "We have enough research evidence to be concerned about the immediate impact of drastic budget cuts or wholesale disbanding of police agencies: Crime and victimization will increase....These collateral consequences will disproportionately harm minority communities that need help, not further marginalization." They go on to state that "Cities that have more police officers per capita tend to have lower crime rates. This does not necessarily mean we need to hire more police. Rather, having more officers per capita provides greater ability to dedicate resources to community- and problem-oriented policing approaches that have been shown to reduce crime and improve community satisfaction." They further argue that police departments need to be held more accountable for their use of funds, suggesting more emphasis on evidence-based practices, and say that making the police responsible for so many social ills should be reconsidered, although stating the infrastructure to handle those should be in place before reallocating funds.

=== Media ===
Matthew Yglesias, writing in Vox, criticized police abolition activists for lacking a plan for how to deal with violent crime, and for ignoring what he calls the "substantial literature" finding that having more police leads to less violent crime. He stated that their dismissal of police reform ignores that even modest reforms have been shown to reduce police misconduct. He writes that across government as a whole, only a very small portion of spending goes to police, and that while more social spending would probably reduce crime, that does not need to come out of police budgets, noting that the United States actually has 35% fewer police officers per capita than the rest of the world. He also states that abolishing public police services would lead to a surge in the use of private security services by those who can afford them, and that such services would lack accountability.

=== Public opinion ===
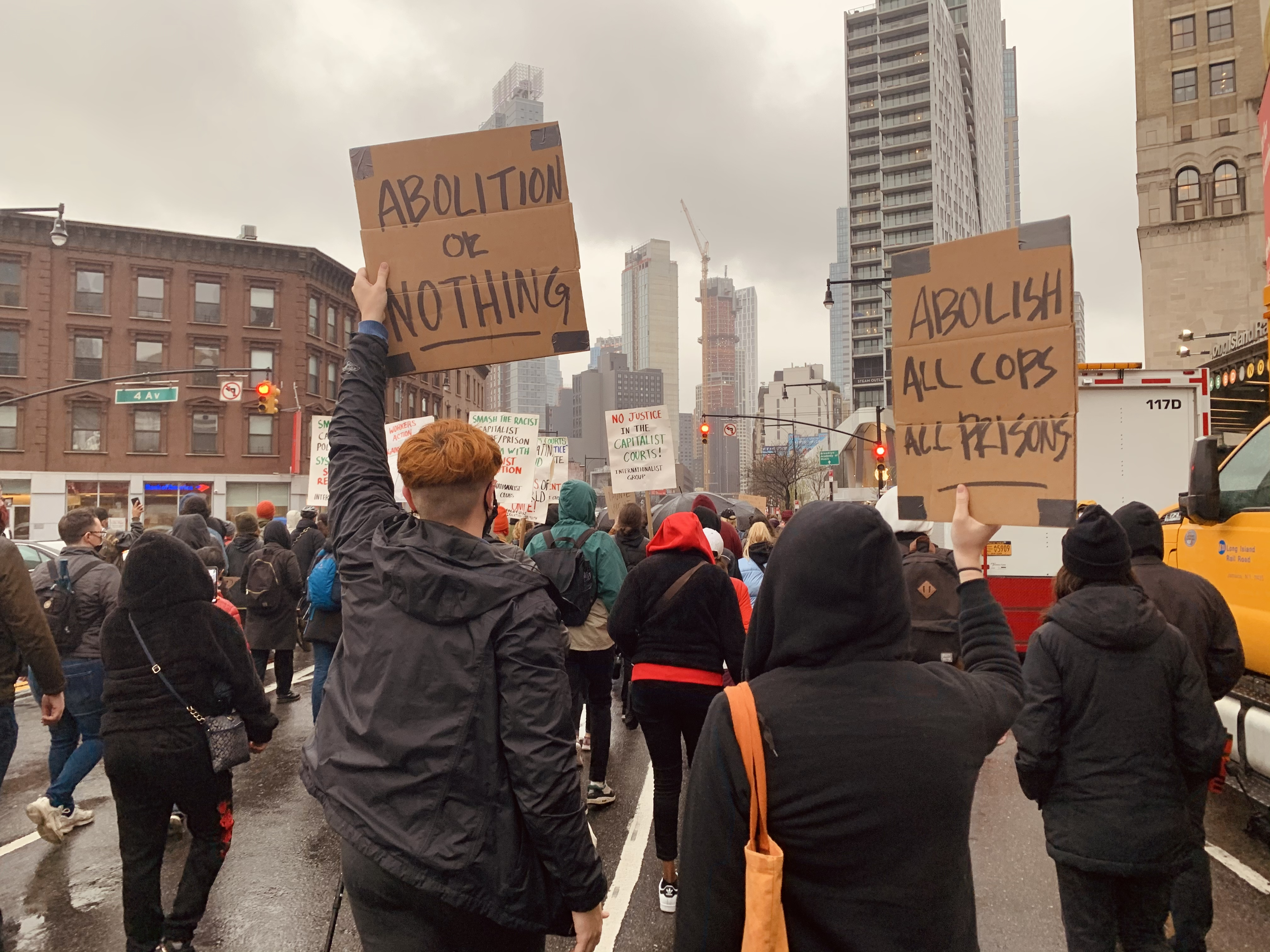
Police abolition advocates in New York City at a protest following the 2021 killing of Daunte Wright

The contemporary police abolition movement began at least as early as 2014 during the Ferguson riots but gained strength in 2020 during the aftermath of the murder of George Floyd and the protests surrounding it.

A YouGov poll from May 29–30, 2020, found that "most Americans do not support reducing law enforcement budgets. Close to two-thirds (65%) oppose cutting police force funding. Just 16 percent of Democrats and 15 percent of Republicans support that idea." An Economist/YouGov poll from June 14–16, 2020, found that 22 percent of African-Americans favor police abolition. A June 23–July 6 survey by Gallup found that 81% of African-Americans wanted police to spend the same amount of time or more time in their neighborhoods, as did 86% of the sample as a whole.

=== Politicians ===
Former U.S. president Joe Biden does not support defunding or abolishing the police. Many members of the U.S. House of Representatives have criticized the movement as a distraction from other efforts, including Karen Bass, chair of the Congressional Black Caucus. House Majority Whip Jim Clyburn warned Democratic leaders against engaging in the movement on a private call in June 2020, over fears that Republicans could propagandize the controversy during the upcoming election. U.S. Senator Bernie Sanders opposed police abolition, stating that all cities in the world have police; instead, he argued that police departments should be staffed with "well-educated, well-trained, well-paid professionals", stating "we want to redefine what police departments do, give them the support they need to make their jobs better" while ensuring "every police officer in this country [is held] accountable for what he or she does."

In his first term, president Donald Trump criticized the efforts to defund police departments and said it was important to have "law and order" in the United States. According to former Attorney General William P. Barr, defunding police would result in an increase in "vigilantism" and "more killings" in major American cities.

=== Cities ===
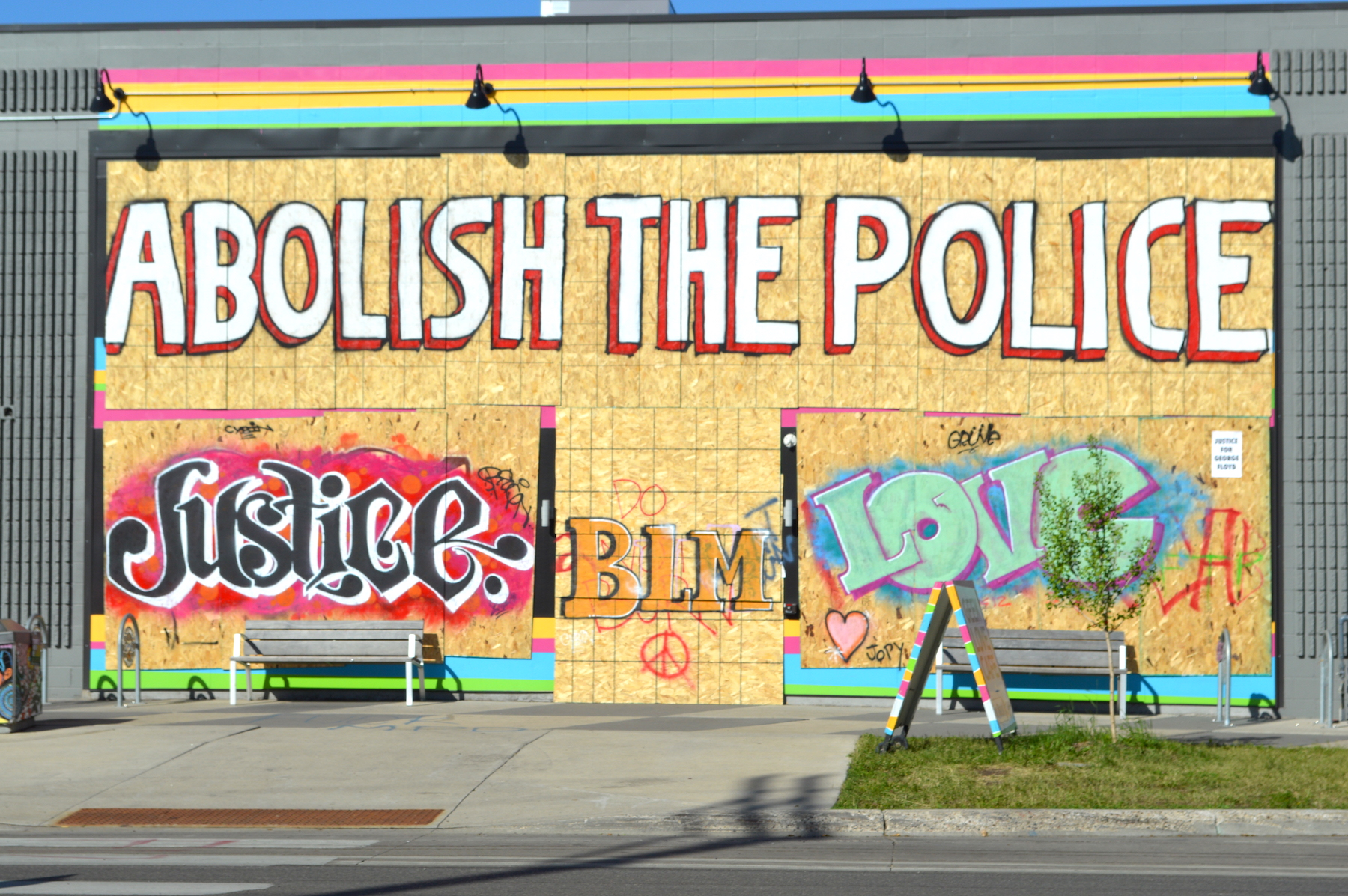
"Abolish the police" graffiti in Minneapolis, Minnesota in June 2020

According to The New York Times, cities across the United States were considering defunding, downsizing, or abolishing their departments following George Floyd's murder.

In Minneapolis, advocacy group MPD150, which had previously published a report in 2017 recommending the Minneapolis Police Department (MPD) be abolished, argued that "the people who respond to crises in our community should be the people who are best-equipped to deal with those crises" and that first responders should be social workers and mental health providers. Public schools, parks, multiple private businesses and venues, and the University of Minnesota have severed ties with the police department. Minneapolis mayor Jacob Frey was booed by a large crowd of protestors after refusing to defund and abolish the police.

Nine members of the Minneapolis City Council—a veto-proof majority—pledged on June 7, 2020 to dismantle the Minneapolis Police Department, despite opposition from Mayor Frey. Supporters of the pledge included Alondra Cano, Jeremiah Ellison, and council president Lisa Bender. U.S. representative Ilhan Omar, whose district includes Minneapolis, stated, "the Minneapolis Police Department has proven themselves beyond reform. It's time to disband them and reimagine public safety in Minneapolis." A few weeks after the pledge, the City Council passed a provision for a public referendum to amend the city's charter to do so, as the charter required the city to "fund a police force of at least 0.0017 employees per resident." The proposed amendment was blocked by the Charter Commission, who said it lacked legal provisions and necessary public input.

In September 2020, the pledge to abolish the department was set aside. Elected officials said there was widespread disagreement about its meaning, even at the time the pledge was taken. Lisa Bender said that different interpretations of the pledge by different council members had created confusion. The New York Times reported that the pledge "has been rejected by the city's mayor, a plurality of residents in recent public opinion polls, and an increasing number of community groups. Taking its place have been the types of incremental reforms that the city's progressive politicians had denounced." The police abolition efforts culminated in the 2021 Minneapolis Question 2 ballot measure to replace the city's police department with a public safety department that failed by a 56.2 percent to 43.8 percent vote margin.

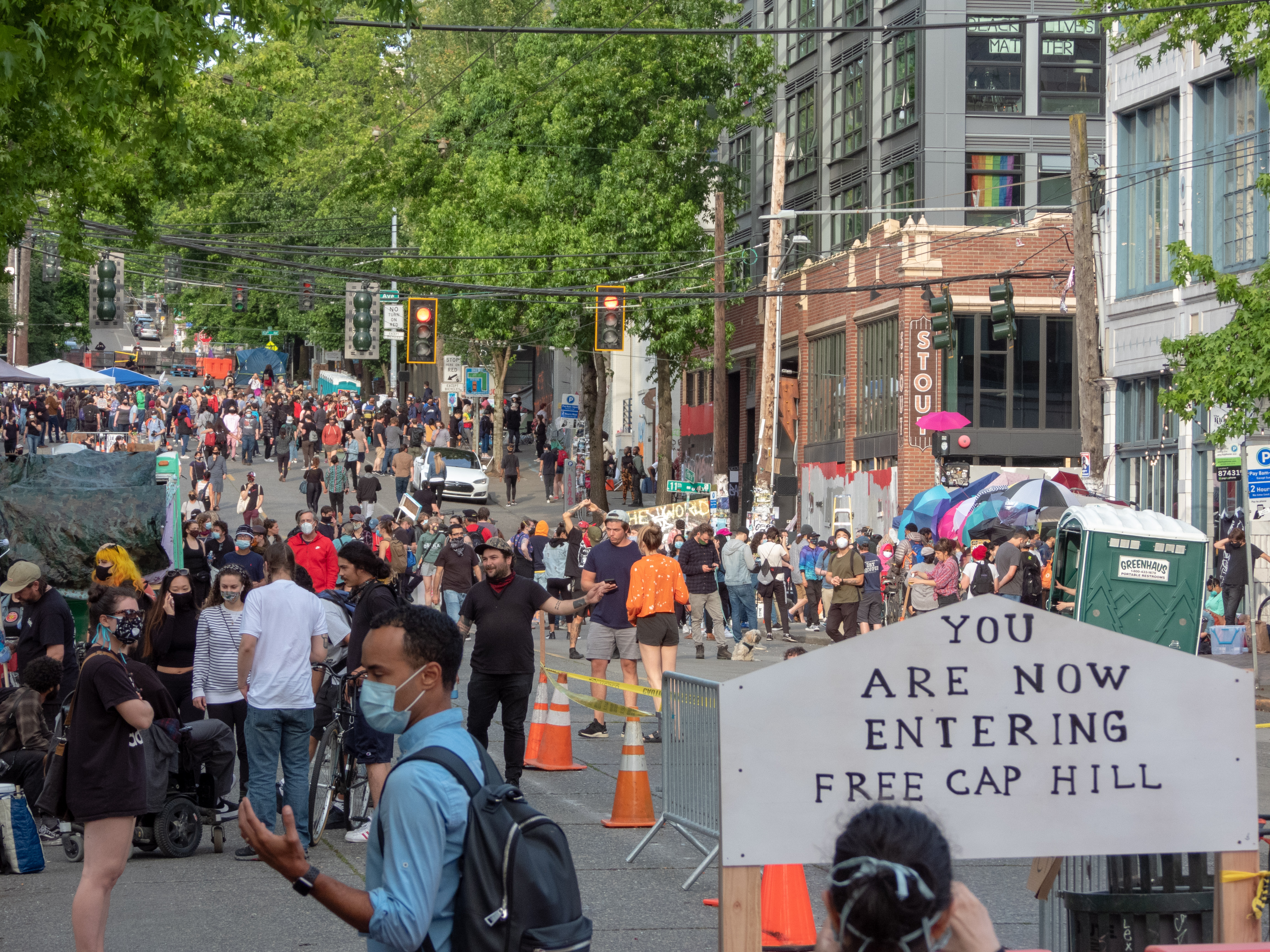
On June 8, 2020, the police-free Capitol Hill Autonomous Zone was established in the Capitol Hill neighborhood of Seattle.

The New York Times described the six-block Capitol Hill Autonomous Zone in Seattle as an example of police abolition put into practice, because police did not respond to calls in the zone and the local precinct was closed. They reported that the zone had its own self-appointed armed guards, and described cases of harassment and intimidation of businesses and customers, as well as vandalism. Business within the zone crashed. There were four shootings in the zone, two of them fatal, before the police retook the zone.

Activist Albert Corado, whose sister Melyda was killed by police during the 2018 Los Angeles hostage incident, became the first candidate nationwide to run on a police abolition platform when he announced a bid for Los Angeles City Council in 2020.

== See also ==
- Abolish ICE
- ACAB, acronym for "All Cops Are Bastards"
- Anarchism
- Anarchist criminology
- Anti-police sentiment
- Crime in the United States
- Criminal justice reform
- Cure Violence, a public health anti-violence program
- Defund the police
- Nonviolence
- Overcriminalization
- Pacifism
- Police brutality
- Police brutality in the United States
- Race and the war on drugs
- Race in the United States criminal justice system
- Restorative justice
- Transformative justice
