= The School Project =

- Country of origin: United States
- Original language: English
- No. of episodes: 6

Production
- Executive producers: Bob Hercules; Gordon Quinn
- Producers: Rachel Dickson; Danny Alpert; Jon Siskel
- Running time: 10 minutes

Original release
- Release: October 28, 2014 – May 21, 2015

The School Project is an independent cross-platform media project. It explores what a healthy public education system looks like through the lens of Chicago Public Schools. It focuses on issues including standardized testing, charter schools, privatization, and school closings. It is a collaboration between Kartemquin Films, Siskel/Jacobs Productions, Free Spirit Media, Kindling Group, Media Process Group, and several freelancers. Its media partners include Catalyst Chicago, Chicago Sun-Times, and WTTW/Channel 11.

The School Project episodes were each released as a free public screening in locations ranging from the Chicago History Museum to the University of Chicago. Each screening was followed by a panel discussion and was broadcast on Chicago news station WTTW. The School Project continues to collect stories.

The School Project is supported by the John D. and Catherine T. MacArthur Foundation, the Woods Fund of Chicago, the Driehaus Foundation, and Chicago Filmmakers.

== Background ==
The project began as a result of the 2013 closing of 49 neighborhood schools in Chicago — the largest school closings in American history. In response to this decision, filmmakers Gordon Quinn of Kartemquin Films and Bob Hercules of Media Process Group combined their talents, with the additional partners of Siskel/Jacos Productions, Free Spirit Media, and Kindling Group, to create a short documentary series and Transmedia project investigating the state of education in Chicago. The collaboration came about out of a desire to merge all of the groups' differing experiences with the subject matter and interested networks.

== Episodes ==
No.	Release date	Title
1	10/28/14	Chicago Schools: The Worst in the Nation?
2	01/22/15	Chicago's School Closings
3	03/05/15	The Impact of School Discipline Policies
4	03/31/15	Testing Season
5	04/25/15	UnChartered Territory with WTTW
6	05/21/15	Teaching
