= List of killings by law enforcement officers in the United States, July 2018 =

This is a list of people reported killed by non-military law enforcement officers in the United States in July 2018, whether in the line of duty or not, and regardless of reason or method. The listing documents the occurrence of a death, making no implications regarding wrongdoing or justification on the part of the person killed or officer involved. Killings are arranged by date of the incident that caused death. Different death dates, if known, are noted in the description. The table below lists 102 people.

== July 2018 ==
Date	Name and age of deceased	Race	State (city)	Description
2018-07-31	David Judge (53)	White	Arizona (Tucson)	
2018-07-31	Skyler Martin (23)	White	Arizona (Phoenix)	
2018-07-30	James Edward Blackmon (35)	Black	Luxora, AR	
2018-07-30	Richard "Gary" Black (73)	White	Colorado (Aurora)	A naked stranger broke into Black's home in the early hours of the morning and attacked Black's 11-year-old grandson. Black shot and killed the intruder. When police arrived, Officer Drew Limbaugh shot and killed an armed Black, assuming him to be the intruder. Only two weeks prior Officer Limbaugh had returned from an administrative leave due to the June 27th killing of Joey Bronson. Prosecutors chose not to charge Limbaugh for either incident.
2018-07-28	Joseph Santos (44)	Hispanic	Allentown, PA	
2018-07-28	Michael Neal (32)	White	Pineville, LA	
2018-07-28	Arthur Kenzie Garner (33)	White	Aberdeen, NC	
2018-07-28	Isaiah Nathaniel Leyva	Hispanic	Denver, CO	
2018-07-27	Julian Jenkins (31)	White	Pilot Point, TX	
2018-07-27	Cynthia Fields (60)	Black	Savannah, GA	
2018-07-27	Richard Mendoza (32)	Hispanic	Los Angeles, CA	
2018-07-27	Lamar Richardson (25)	Black	Toledo, OH	
2018-07-26	Kenneth Edwin Martell (36)	White	Lakemoor, IL	
2018-07-26	Daniel Hambrick (25)	Black	Nashville, TN	
2018-07-26	William Earnest Brooks (43)	Unknown race	Social Circle, GA	
2018-07-26	Sergio Acosta (24)	Hispanic	Redondo Beach, CA	
2018-07-26	Iman Joseph Buford (30)	White	Springdale, AR	
2018-07-26	Jesus Hernandez Murillo (18)	Hispanic	Kent, WA	
2018-07-26	Gavalynn Mahuka (53)	Native Hawaiian and Pacific Islander	Waianae, HI	
2018-07-25	Brent Carl Bowdon (56)	White	Lake Havasu City, AZ	
2018-07-25	Richard Roosevelt Bahr (54)	White	Spokane, WA	
2018-07-25	D'Mario Perkins (29)	Black	Tennessee (Memphis)	
2018-07-25	Michael Heatherly (64)	White	La Follette, TN	
2018-07-25	Jose Luis Rodriguez (23)	Hispanic	Amarillo, TX	
2018-07-24	DeVaughdre Delsha Rogers (20)	Black	Starke, FL	
2018-07-24	Donna Lynn Allen (39)	White	Soddy Daisy, TN	
2018-07-24	Cashus Dean Case (44)	White	Seaside, OR	
2018-07-24	Gregory T. Graham (55)	White	Fayetteville, NC	
2018-07-23	Paul B. Meade (71)	White	Bristol, VA	
2018-07-23	Rosalio Hernandez Ortega (33)	Hispanic	Burlington, NC	
2018-07-23	John Carlos Natera-Perez aka Jean Perez (30)	Hispanic	Silver Spring, MD	
2018-07-22	Juan Garcia (38)	Hispanic	Riverside, CA	
2018-07-22	William Bacorn (18)	White	Colorado Springs, CO	
2018-07-22	Logan Simpson (17)	White	Bixby, OK	
2018-07-22	Juan Ramon Ramos (32)	Hispanic	Highland, CA	
2018-07-22	Schuyler Lake (20)		New York (Albany)	Responding to a domestic violence call, two police officers confronted 20-year-old Lake stabbing his mother in the face. After refusing to drop the knife one of the officers shot Lake, killing him. Lake's mother along with his uncle had been stabbed and were treated at the hospital.
2018-07-21	Melyda Corado (27)	Hispanic	California (Los Angeles)	Ms. Corado, the Trader Joe's store manager, was killed by LAPD during a hostage situation. Authorities said Ms. Corado was exiting the grocery store just as suspect Gene Atkins, 28, crashed his car into a light post during a police chase and began exchanging gunfire with two responding officers.
2018-07-21	Vincent James Ewer II (39)	White	Arizona (Tucson)	
2018-07-21	Ruben Maya (37)	Hispanic	Fresno, CA	
2018-07-21	Dale Slocum (57)	White	Toledo, OH	
2018-07-21	Eliuth Penaloza Nava (50)	Hispanic	Anaheim, CA	
2018-07-21	Anthony C. Lopez (21)	Hispanic	Arizona (Mesa)	
2018-07-20	Justin Joshua Waiki (33)	Native Hawaiian	Naalehu, HI	
2018-07-20	Anthony Coleman (38)	White	Lady Lake, FL	
2018-07-20	Arthur C. Levario Jr. (45)	Hispanic	Riverside, CA	
2018-07-20	Javier Lopez (19)	White	Texas (Houston)	
2018-07-19	Christopher A. Roberts (32)	White	Louisville, KY	
2018-07-19	Carmelo Pizarro Jr. (22)	Hispanic	Pico Rivera, CA	
2018-07-19	Luis Cruz (19)	Hispanic	Peoria, IL	
2018-07-18	Mickey Coy (59)	White	Pattison, TX	
2018-07-18	Arthur Lee Lujan (30)	Hispanic	New Mexico (Albuquerque)	
2018-07-18	Wesley Shelton (33)	White	Fletcher, NC	
2018-07-17	Isaiah M. Hayes (25)	White	Altoona, IA	
2018-07-17	Rolando Brizuela (57)	Hispanic	Sparks, NV	
2018-07-17	Kerry Edwin Townsend (51)	White	Lenoir, NC	
2018-07-17	Juan Manuel Correa-Leyva (27)	Hispanic	Arizona (Tucson)	
2018-07-15	Jonathan Molina (23)	Hispanic	New Mexico (Albuquerque)	
2018-07-15	Marlin Mack (25)	Black	Kansas City, MO	
2018-07-14	Erick Aguirre (25)	Hispanic	Bloomington, CA	
2018-07-14	Isaac "Chucky" Ovidio Chapa III (34)	White	Alvin, TX	
2018-07-14	Rashuan Washington (37)	Black	New Jersey (Vineland)	Responding to a call, police officers approached Washington, who was standing shirtless in his driveway with a bundle in his right hand. Washington repeatedly claimed he had a bomb, daring officers to shoot him, and did not comply with police orders to show his hands. After a 28 minute standoff, one of the officers opened fire on Washington after he did not comply with orders. After the incident, it became clear that Washington was unarmed. Protests followed the week of the shooting.
2018-07-14	Harith L. Augustus (37)	Black	Illinois (Chicago)	Police officers approached Augustus, whom they observed on a sidewalk with “a bulge on his waistline that they believed could be a gun”. Augustus pushed their hands away, resisting, and began to flee by running into the street. The gun was revealed during the scuffle. Augustus reached for the gun as he fled, and officers shot him.
2018-07-14	Jethro Benjamin (68)	Black	South Carolina (Florence)	Police were called to a Hilton Garden inn on reports of an individual in the parking lot walking around with a firearm. When officers arrived on the scene they noticed an individual who ignored orders and hid behind a car. The individual then got up and started shooting at the police. Police shot back, hitting the suspect multiple times, killing him. He was later identified as 68-year-old Jethro Benjamin.
2018-07-13	Tim Gohann Braun (60)	White	Riverview, FL	
2018-07-13	Jesse Darian Carrillo (17)	Hispanic	Dallas, TX	
2018-07-13	Juan Luna (25)	Hispanic	Dilley, TX	
2018-07-13	Archer Amorosi (17)	White	Excelsior, MN	
2018-07-12	Joey Loop (40)	White	Cottage Grove, OR	
2018-07-11	Fidel Miranda (22)	Hispanic	Nevada (Las Vegas)	A vehicle refused to stop during a tragic stop were the occupants of the vehicle were suspects in a murder of a man at a carwash. The vehicle led police on a length case where the occupants to the vehicle fired 34 shots at the officers and the officers, in turn, fired 31 shots. The case ended after the vehicle crashed into an elementary school, one of the occupants fled and was apprehended, the second continued to fire shots and was killed. The deceased individual was identified as 23-year-old Fidel Miranda, and the other occupant was identified as 30-year-old Rene Nunez. Both individuals had lengthy criminal records and wanted on multiple felonies in addition to their alleged involvement in the earlier murder.
2018-07-11	Laura Mae Bond	White	Willis, TX	
2018-07-11	Salome Ramirez (34)	Hispanic	Los Banos, CA	
2018-07-10	Shaun Leo Gates (40)	White	Garland, TX	
2018-07-10	Leonardo Cano (53)	White	Hialeah, FL	
2018-07-10	William T. McCollum (21)	White	Casper, WY	
2018-07-09	Gregory Longenecker (51)		Pennsylvania (Penn Township, Berks County)	Police were searching for Longenecker, who was accused of growing ten marijuana plants on state game lands. Police searched using a bulldozer, and accidentally ran over Longenecker.
2018-07-08	Joseph Pettaway (51)	Black	Alabama (Montgomery)	Pettaway was killed by a K-9 while sleeping in an unoccupied home.
2018-07-08	Craig Yelton (34)	White	Arizona (Tucson)	
2018-07-08	Ngoc Dang Nguyen (28)	Asian	Westminster, CA	
2018-07-08	John Francis Murphy III (41)	White	Grand Forks, ND	
2018-07-07	Kelly Kenneth Sutton (27)	White	Amity, OR	
2018-07-07	Adrian Emmanuel Martinez	Hispanic	Denver, CO	
2018-07-07	Harold Eugene Kraai (52)	White	Florida (Jacksonville)	
2018-07-06	Charles Webb (43)	Black	Overland Park, KS	
2018-07-06	Eric Hash (38)	Native American	Copper Center, AK	
2018-07-05	Raad Fakhri Salman (62)	Asian	Louisville, KY	
2018-07-05	Tracy A. Richards (55)	White	Eustis, FL	
2018-07-05	Sylvia Marie Bejarano (33)	Hispanic	Arizona (Tempe)	
2018-07-05	Daniel A. Fuller (26)	White	Devils Lake, ND	
2018-07-05	John James Corrigan (38)	White	San Andreas, CA	
2018-07-04	Frank W. "Franko" Dripps IV (52)	White	South Elgin, IL	
2018-07-04	Emmanuel Bitsuie (32)	Native American	Pueblo, CO	
2018-07-04	Ryan Turner Force (35)	White	Griffin, GA	
2018-07-03	Millard Clark (41)	Native American	Lawton, OK	
2018-07-03	Terrell Eason (33)	Black	Illinois (Chicago)	
2018-07-03	Christian T. Webb (24)	White	Kansas (Wichita)	
2018-07-03	Lemuel Bunn (40)	Black	Fayetteville, NC	
2018-07-03	Walter Giron (61)	White	Olathe, CO	
2018-07-03	Samuel Giron (54)	White	Olathe, CO	
2018-07-01	Larry San Nicolas (60)	Native Hawaiian and Pacific Islander	Grandview, MO	
2018-07-01	Daniel Isaiah Norris (33)	White	Boise, ID	
2018-07-01	Joshua Blake Reed (26)	White	Panora, IA	
2018-07-01	Donadony Blake Taylor (46)	Black	Santa Ana, CA	

== See also ==
- Death in custody § United States
- Henry A. Wallace Police Crime Public Database
- List of cases of police brutality
- List of countries with annual rates and counts for killings by law enforcement officers
- List of law enforcement officers killed in the line of duty in the United States
- List of law enforcement officers convicted for an on-duty killing in the United States
- List of shootings by US immigration agents
- List of police reforms related to the George Floyd protests
- List of unarmed African Americans killed by law enforcement officers in the United States
- Lists of killings by law enforcement officers
- Police brutality in the United States
- Police misconduct § United States
- Police riot § United States
- Police use of deadly force in the United States
