= Mariame Kaba =

American activist and community organizer (born 1971)

- Born: 1971 (age 54–55); New York City, New York, U.S.
- Education: McGill University (BA), Pratt Institute (MSLIS)
- Occupation: Organizer
- Notable work: We Do This 'Til We Free Us

Mariame Kaba is an American activist, grassroots organizer, and educator who advocates for prison and police abolition. She is the author of We Do This 'Til We Free Us (2021). The Mariame Kaba Papers are held by the Chicago Public Library Special Collections.

== Early life and education ==
Mariame Kaba was born in New York City to immigrant parents. Her Senegalese mother emigrated from the Ivory Coast; her father was involved in the independence movement in Guinea.

Kaba grew up on the Lower East Side of Manhattan and attended the Lycée Français de New York. She grew up with a black nationalist and collectivist framework from her parents. Kaba received a B.A. in sociology from McGill University in 1992. In 1995 she moved to Chicago to study sociology at Northwestern University. She completed her master's degree in library and information science at Pratt Institute.

== Career ==
In Chicago, she co-founded the Chicago Freedom School, the Rogers Park Young Women's Action Team, the Chicago Taskforce on Violence against Girls and Young Women, the Chicago Alliance to Free Marissa Alexander, and We Charge Genocide. In 2009, Kaba founded the organization Project NIA, which advocates to end youth incarceration.

Kaba views prison abolition as the total dismantling of prison and policing while building up community services and opposes police reform. Her work has created the framework for current abolitionist organizations including Black Youth Project 100, Black Lives Matter Chicago, and Assata's Daughters. She also helped found the organization Survived and Punished, an abolitionist organization that seeks to end sentencing for victims of intimate partner violence who defend themselves. This project grew out of efforts to free Marissa Alexander.

=== Writing ===
Kaba maintained a blog, US Prison Culture, from 2010 until 2020. She was active on Twitter under the account @prisonculture. She is now active on BlueSky under the handle @prisonculture.bsky.social.

In 2012, she wrote Resisting Police Violence in Harlem, a historical pamphlet detailing the policing and violence in Harlem.

In March 2018, she wrote Lifting As They Climbed: Mapping A History Of Black Women On Chicago's South Side with Essence McDowell. Started in 2012, the book is written as a guidebook that maps the history of the influential Black women who contributed to the development of Chicago during the 19th and 20th centuries.

In 2021, she published We Do This 'Til We Free Us with Haymarket Books. It debuted at number nine on The New York Times Best Seller list for non-fiction paperbacks. In a review for the Chicago Reader, Ariel Parrella-Aureli describes it as "a collection of talks, interviews, and past work that can serve as an initial primer on the PIC abolition and community building rooted in transformative justice." Kaba was reluctant to write the book, but the mass protests in the summer of 2020 persuaded her, in the interests of lending her tools for collective action to newly activated organizers.

In 2023, Kaba published Let This Radicalize You: Organizing and the Revolution of Reciprocal Care, co-written with fellow organizer Kelly Hayes. In the book's introduction, Kaba described it as an "attempt to distill some of the lessons we've learned about organizing over the past few decades and to include some lessons from other organizers." The book was recommended by the New York Times and was reviewed in The Nation, the Chicago Reader, and elsewhere. The book is named after a tweet of Kaba's that took hold as a slogan on the American Left: "Let this radicalize you rather than lead you to despair."

== Awards ==
- 2013 Elevating Youth Voices Award from the Bright Promises Foundation
- 2014 Impact Award from the Chicago Foundation for Women
- 2016 Ella Baker/Septima Clark Human Rights Award from the American Educational Research Association
- 2016 Soros Justice Fellowship from Open Society Foundations
- 2017 Ron Sable Award for Activism from the Crossroads Fund
- 2017 Peace Award from the War Resisters League
- 2022 Honorary degree from the Chicago Theological Seminary
- 2022 Freedom Scholar award from the Marguerite Casey Foundation
- 2022 Ann Snitow Prize

== Projects ==
- A World Without Prisons by Project NIA and Free Write Jail Arts & Literacy Program
- Restorative Posters Project: Representing Justice Visually by Project NIA
- No Selves to Defend with Rachel Caidor
- Blood at the Root: Unearthing the Stories of State Violence Against Black Women and Girls with Rachel Caidor, Ayanna Banks Harris, Deana Lewis, Andrea Ritchie, and Ash Stephens
- Making Niggers: Demonizing and Distorting Blackness by Project NIA
- Black/Inside: A History of Captivity & Confinement in the US with Theresa Silva

== Publications ==
- Kaba, Mariame (2012). "An (Abridged) History of Resisting Police Violence in Harlem" (PDF).
- Kaba, Mariame; Smith, Andrea; Adelman, Lori; Gay, Roxane (April 17, 2014). "Where Twitter and Feminism Meet". The Nation. ISSN 0027-8378.
- Kaba, Mariame (August 22, 2014). "For blacks, America is dangerous by default". The Washington Post.
- Kaba, Mariame (October 5, 2015). "Take No Prisoners". Vice.
- Kaba, Mariame (December 28, 2015). "All of Chicago – not just its police – must see systemic change to save black lives | Mariame Kaba". The Guardian.
- Kaba, Mariame (May 10, 2017). "For Mother's Day, Activists Are Bailing Black Mamas out of Jail". Broadly.
- Kaba, Mariame (2017). "Foreword". In Sharpe, Lori; Ginsburg, Jane; Gordon, Gail. Trying to make the personal political: feminism and consciousness-raising : a reprint of consciousness-raising guidelines. Chicago: Half Letter Press. ISBN 978-0-9818023-6-7.
- Kaba, Mariame (2018). "To Live and Die in 'Chiraq'". In Johnson, Javon; Coval, Kevin (eds.). The end of Chiraq: a literary mixtape. Evanston, Illinois: Northwestern University Press. ISBN 978-0-8101-3718-9.
- Kaba, Mariame; Lenz, Colby (February 5, 2018). "Bresha Meadows Returns Home After Collective Organizing Efforts". Teen Vogue.
- Kaba, Mariame (May 2, 2018). "Why I'm Raising Money to Build an Ida B. Wells Monument". Huffington Post.
- Kaba, Mariame (2018). "Foreword". In Samudzi, Zoé; Anderson, William C. As Black As Resistance: Finding the Conditions for Liberation. Chico, California: AK Press. ISBN 9781849353168.
- Kaba, Mariame; Hassan, Shira (June 18, 2019). Fumbling Towards Repair: A Workbook for Community Accountability Facilitators. Project NIA.
- Kaba, Mariame (September 17, 2019). Missing Daddy. Illustrated by royal bria. Haymarket Books.
- Kaba, Mariame (June 12, 2020). "Opinion | Yes, We Mean Literally Abolish the Police". The New York Times. ISSN 0362-4331.
- Kaba, Mariame (February 23, 2021). We Do This 'Til We Free Us: Abolitionist Organizing and Transforming Justice. Abolition Papers #1. Haymarket Books.
- Kaba, Mariame; Love, Bettina L.; Education for Liberation Network & Critical Resistance Editorial Collective (September 28, 2021). Lessons in Liberation: An Abolitionist Toolkit for Educators. AK Press.
- Kaba, Mariame; Diaz, Bianca (March 1, 2022). See You Soon. Haymarket Books.
- Kaba, Mariame; Ritchie, Andrea J (October 11, 2022). No More Police: A Case for Abolition. The New Press.
- Kaba, Mariame; Hayes, Kelly (May 16, 2023). Let This Radicalize You: Organizing and the Revolution of Reciprocal Care. Haymarket Books.
- McDowell, Essence; Kaba, Mariame (August 8, 2023). Lifting As They Climbed: Mapping a History of Trailblazing Black Women in Chicago. Haymarket Books.
- Kaba, Mariame (2024). "Foreword". In Herzing, Rachel; Piché, Justin (2024). How to abolish prisons: lessons from the movement against imprisonment. Chicago: Haymarket Books. ISBN 979-8-88890-102-1.
- Kaba, Mariame; Ball, Jane (April 8, 2025). Prisons Must Fall. Illustrated by Olly Costello. Haymarket Books.
