= Employment discrimination law in the United States =

Employment discrimination law in the United States derives from the common law, and is codified in numerous state, federal, and local laws. These laws prohibit discrimination based on certain characteristics or "protected categories". The United States Constitution also prohibits discrimination by federal and state governments against their public employees. Discrimination in the private sector is not directly constrained by the Constitution, but has become subject to a growing body of federal and state law, including the Title VII of the Civil Rights Act of 1964. Federal law prohibits discrimination in a number of areas, including recruiting, hiring, job evaluations, promotion policies, training, compensation and disciplinary action. State laws often extend protection to additional categories or employers.

Under federal employment discrimination law, employers generally cannot discriminate against employees on the basis of race, sex (including sexual orientation and gender identity), pregnancy, religion, national origin, disability (physical or mental, including status), age (for workers over 40), military service or affiliation, bankruptcy or bad debts, genetic information, and citizenship status (for citizens, permanent residents, temporary residents, refugees, and asylees).

== List of United States federal discrimination law ==
- Equal Pay Act of 1963
- Civil Rights Act of 1964
  - Title VI of the Civil Rights Act of 1964
  - Title VII of the Civil Rights Act of 1964
- Executive Order 11246
- Age Discrimination in Employment Act of 1967
- Education Amendments of 1972
  - Title IX
- Rehabilitation Act of 1973
- Vietnam Era Veterans' Readjustment Assistance Act of 1974
- Age Discrimination Act of 1975
- Americans with Disabilities Act of 1990
- Genetic Information Nondiscrimination Act of 2008
- Pregnancy Discrimination Act of 1978
- The Employee Retirement Income Security Act of 1974
- Immigration Reform and Control Act of 1986
- Age Discrimination Claims Assistance Act of 1988

== Constitutional basis ==
The United States Constitution does not directly address employment discrimination, but its prohibitions on discrimination by the federal government have been held to protect federal government employees.

The Fifth and Fourteenth Amendments to the United States Constitution limit the power of the federal and state governments to discriminate. The Fifth Amendment has an explicit requirement that the federal government does not deprive individuals of "life, liberty, or property", without due process of the law. It also contains an implicit guarantee that the Fourteenth Amendment explicitly prohibits states from violating an individual's rights of due process and equal protection. In the employment context, these Constitutional provisions would limit the right of the state and federal governments to discriminate in their employment practices by treating employees, former employees, or job applicants unequally because of membership in a group (such as a race or sex). Due process protection requires that government employees have a fair procedural process before they are terminated if the termination is related to a "liberty" (such as the right to free speech) or property interest. As both Due Process and Equal Protection Clauses are passive, the clause that empowers Congress to pass anti-discrimination bills (so they are not unconstitutional under Tenth Amendment) is Section 5 of Fourteenth Amendment.

Employment discrimination or harassment in the private sector is not unconstitutional because Federal and most State Constitutions do not expressly give their respective government the power to enact civil rights laws that apply to the private sector. The Federal government's authority to regulate a private business, including civil rights laws, stems from their power to regulate all commerce between the States. Some State Constitutions do expressly afford some protection from public and private employment discrimination, such as Article I of the California Constitution. However, most State Constitutions only address discriminatory treatment by the government, including a public employer.

Absent of a provision in a State Constitution, State civil rights laws that regulate the private sector are generally Constitutional under the "police powers" doctrine or the power of a State to enact laws designed to protect public health, safety and morals. All States must adhere to the Federal Civil Rights laws, but States may enact civil rights laws that offer additional employment protection.

For example, some State civil rights laws offer protection from employment discrimination on the basis of political affiliation, even though such forms of discrimination are not yet covered in federal civil rights laws.

== History of federal laws ==
Federal law governing employment discrimination has developed over time.

The Equal Pay Act amended the Fair Labor Standards Act in 1963. It is enforced by the Wage and Hour Division of the Department of Labor. The Equal Pay Act prohibits employers and unions from paying different wages based on sex. It does not prohibit other discriminatory practices in hiring. It provides that where workers perform equal work in the corner requiring "equal skill, effort, and responsibility and performed under similar working conditions," they should be provided equal pay. The Fair Labor Standards Act applies to employers engaged in some aspect of interstate commerce, or all of an employer's workers if the enterprise is engaged as a whole in a significant amount of interstate commerce.

Title VII of the Civil Rights Act of 1964 prohibits discrimination in many more aspects of the employment relationship. "Title VII created the Equal Employment Opportunity Commission (EEOC) to administer the act". It applies to most employers engaged in interstate commerce with more than 15 employees, labor organizations, and employment agencies. Title VII prohibits discrimination based on race, color, religion, sex or national origin. It makes it illegal for employers to discriminate based upon protected characteristics regarding terms, conditions, and privileges of employment. Employment agencies may not discriminate when hiring or referring applicants, and labor organizations are also prohibited from basing membership or union classifications on race, color, religion, sex, or national origin. The Pregnancy Discrimination Act amended Title VII in 1978, specifying that unlawful sex discrimination includes discrimination based on pregnancy, childbirth, and related medical conditions. A related statute, the Family and Medical Leave Act, sets requirements governing leave for pregnancy and pregnancy-related conditions.

Executive Order 11246 in 1965 "prohibits discrimination by federal contractors and subcontractors on account of race, color, religion, sex, or national origin [and] requires affirmative action by federal contractors".

The Age Discrimination in Employment Act (ADEA), enacted in 1968 and amended in 1978 and 1986, prohibits employers from discriminating on the basis of age. The prohibited practices are nearly identical to those outlined in Title VII, except that the ADEA protects workers in firms with 20 or more workers rather than 15 or more. An employee is protected from discrimination based on age if he or she is over 40. Since 1978, the ADEA has phased out and prohibited mandatory retirement, except for high-powered decision-making positions (that also provide large pensions). The ADEA contains explicit guidelines for benefit, pension and retirement plans. Though ADEA is the center of most discussion of age discrimination legislation, there is a longer history starting with the abolishment of "maximum ages of entry into employment in 1956" by the United States Civil Service Commission. Then in 1964, Executive Order 11141 "established a policy against age discrimination among federal contractors".

The Rehabilitation Act of 1973 prohibits employment discrimination on the basis of disability by the federal government, federal contractors with contracts of more than $10,000, and programs receiving federal financial assistance. It requires affirmative action as well as non-discrimination. Section 504 requires reasonable accommodation, and Section 508 requires that electronic and information technology be accessible to disabled employees.

The Black Lung Benefits Act of 1972 prohibits discrimination by mine operators against miners who suffer from "black lung disease" (pneumoconiosis).

The Vietnam Era Readjustment Act of 1974 "requires affirmative action for disabled and Vietnam era veterans by federal contractors".

The Bankruptcy Reform Act of 1978 prohibits employment discrimination on the basis of bankruptcy or bad debts.

The Immigration Reform and Control Act of 1986 prohibits employers with more than three employees from discriminating against anyone (except an unauthorized immigrant) on the basis of national origin or citizenship status.

The Americans with Disabilities Act of 1990 (ADA) was enacted to eliminate discriminatory barriers against qualified individuals with disabilities, individuals with a record of a disability, or individuals who are regarded as having a disability. It prohibits discrimination based on real or perceived physical or mental disabilities. It also requires employers to provide reasonable accommodations to employees who need them because of a disability to apply for a job, perform the essential functions of a job, or enjoy the benefits and privileges of employment, unless the employer can show that undue hardship will result. There are strict limitations on when an employer can ask disability-related questions or require medical examinations, and all medical information must be treated as confidential. A disability is defined under the ADA as a mental or physical health condition that "substantially limits one or more major life activities."

The Nineteenth Century Civil Rights Acts, amended in 1993, ensure all persons equal rights under the law and outline the damages available to complainants in actions brought under Title VII of the Civil Rights Act of 1964, the Americans with Disabilities Act, and the 1973 Rehabilitation Act.

The Genetic Information Nondiscrimination Act of 2008 bars employers from using individuals' genetic information when making hiring, firing, job placement, or promotion decisions.

The proposed US Equality Act of 2015 would ban discrimination on the basis of sexual orientation or gender identity. As of June 2018, 28 US states do not explicitly include sexual orientation and 29 US states do not explicitly include gender identity within anti-discrimination statutes.

== LGBT employment discrimination ==
Title VII of the Civil Rights Act of 1964 prohibits employment discrimination on the basis of sexual orientation or gender identity. This is encompassed by the law's prohibition of employment discrimination on the basis of sex. Prior to the landmark cases Bostock v. Clayton County and R.G. & G.R. Harris Funeral Homes Inc. v. Equal Employment Opportunity Commission (2020), employment protections for LGBT people were patchwork; several states and localities explicitly prohibit harassment and bias in employment decisions on the basis of sexual orientation and/or gender identity, although some only cover public employees. Prior to the Bostock decision, the Equal Employment Opportunity Commission (EEOC) interpreted Title VII to cover LGBT employees; the EEOC's determined that transgender employees were protected under Title VII in 2012, and extended the protection to encompass sexual orientation in 2015.

According to Crosby Burns and Jeff Krehely: "Studies show that anywhere from 15 percent to 43 percent of gay people have experienced some form of discrimination and harassment at the workplace. Moreover, a staggering 90 percent of transgender workers report some form of harassment or mistreatment on the job." Many people in the LGBT community have lost their job, including Vandy Beth Glenn, a transgender woman who claims that her boss told her that her presence may make other people feel uncomfortable.

Almost half of the United States also have state-level or municipal-level laws banning the discrimination of gender non-conforming and transgender people in both public and private workplaces. A few more states ban LGBT discrimination in only public workplaces. Some opponents of these laws believe that it would intrude on religious liberty, even though these laws are focused more on discriminatory actions, not beliefs. Courts have also identified that these laws do not infringe free speech or religious liberty.

== State law ==
State statutes also provide extensive protection from employment discrimination. Some laws extend similar protection as provided by the federal acts to employers who are not covered by those statutes. Other statutes provide protection to groups not covered by the federal acts. Some state laws provide greater protection to employees of the state or of state contractors.

The following table lists categories not protected by federal law. Age is included as well, since federal law only covers workers over 40.

State or territory	Marital status	Medical condition	Political affiliation	Military discharge status	Age	Familial status	Public assistance status	Use of lawful product
Alabama					Yes (40+)			
Alaska	Yes				Yes (unknown age range)	Yes (parenthood)		
Arizona								
Arkansas								
California	Yes	Yes	Yes (Does not apply to State employees who are members of the Communist Party)	Yes (and status as active duty military)	Yes (40+)	Yes (marital status only, although pregnancy and childbirth status are also protected)		
Colorado					Yes (unknown age range)			Yes (any lawful activity)
Connecticut	Yes				Yes (unknown age range)			
Delaware	Yes				Yes (40+)			
(Washington, D.C.) District of Columbia	Yes (including domestic partnership)		Yes		Yes (18+)	"family responsibilities", parenthood under "marital status"		
Florida	Yes				Yes (unknown age range)			
(Georgia (U.S. state)) Georgia					Yes (40-70)			
Hawaii	Yes				Yes (unknown age range)			
Idaho					Yes (40+)			
Illinois	Yes			Yes ("unfavorable discharge from military service")	Yes (40+)			
Indiana					Yes (40-75)			use of tobacco
Iowa					Yes (18+ or legal adult)			
Kansas					Yes (18+)			
Kentucky					Yes (40+)			(smoker/nonsmoker)
Louisiana		"sickle cell trait"			Yes (40+)			
Maine					Yes (unknown age range)			
Maryland	Yes				Yes (unknown age range)			
Massachusetts					Yes (>40)			
Michigan	Yes				Yes			
Minnesota	Yes				Yes (over age of majority)		Yes	
Mississippi								
Missouri					Yes (40-70)			
Montana	Yes				Yes			
Nebraska	Yes				Yes (40+)			
Nevada					Yes (40+)			Yes
New Hampshire	Yes				Yes (which ages?)			
New Jersey	Yes (civil union status or domestic partnership status)	"atypical hereditary cellular or blood trait"			Yes (18+)	Yes		
New Mexico	Yes ("spousal affiliation")	"serious medical condition"			Yes (unknown age range)			
(New York (state)) New York	Yes		Yes "political activities"		Yes (18+)			Yes
North Carolina		(sickle cell or hemoglobin C trait)						Yes
North Dakota	Yes				Yes (40+)		Yes	Yes ("lawful activity")
Ohio					Yes (40+)			
Oklahoma					Yes (40+)			
Oregon	Yes				Yes (18+)			use of tobacco
Pennsylvania					Yes (40+)			
Rhode Island					Yes (40+)			
South Carolina					Yes (40+)			
South Dakota								
Tennessee					Yes (40+)			
Texas					Yes (40+)			
Utah					Yes (40+)			
Vermont					Yes (18+)			
Virginia					Yes (40+)			
(Washington (state)) Washington	Yes	Hepatitis C			Yes (40+)			
West Virginia					Yes (40+)			
Wisconsin	Yes			Yes	Yes (40+)			Yes
Wyoming					Yes (40+)			
Guam					Yes (40+)			
Puerto Rico			Yes (political affiliation or ideology)		Yes (legal working age+)			
(United States Virgin Islands) US Virgin Islands					Yes (unknown age range)			
State or territory	Marital status	Medical condition	Political affiliation	Military discharge status	Age	Familial status	Public assistance status	Use of lawful product

In addition,

- District of Columbia - matriculation, personal appearance
- Michigan - height, weight
- Texas - Participation in emergency evacuation order
- Vermont - Place of birth

== Government employees ==
Title VII also applies to state, federal, local and other public employees. Employees of federal and state governments have additional protections against employment discrimination.

The Civil Service Reform Act of 1978 prohibits discrimination in federal employment on the basis of conduct that does not affect job performance. The Office of Personnel Management has interpreted this as prohibiting discrimination on the basis of sexual orientation. In June 2009, it was announced that the interpretation would be expanded to include gender identity.

Additionally, public employees retain their First Amendment rights, whereas private employers have the right to limits employees' speech in certain ways. Public employees retain their First Amendment rights insofar as they are speaking as a private citizen (not on behalf of their employer), they are speaking on a matter of public concern, and their speech is not interfering with their job.

Federal employees who have employment discrimination claims, such as postal workers of the United States Postal Service (USPS) must sue in the proper federal jurisdiction, which poses a different set of issues for plaintiffs.

== Exceptions ==
=== Bona fide occupational qualifications ===
Employers are generally allowed to consider characteristics that would otherwise be discriminatory if they are bona fide occupational qualifications (BFOQ). The most common BFOQ is sex, and the second most common BFOQ is age. Bona Fide Occupational Qualifications cannot be used for discrimination on the basis of race.

The only exception to this rule is demonstrated in a single case, Wittmer v. Peters, where the court rules that law enforcement surveillance can match races when necessary. For instance, if police are running operations that involve confidential informants, or undercover agents, sending an African American officer into a sting for a KKK white supremacy group. Additionally, police departments, such as the department in Ferguson, Missouri, can consider race-based policing and hire officers that are proportionate to the community's racial makeup.

BFOQs do not apply in the entertainment industry, such as casting for movies and television. Directors, producers and casting staff are allowed to cast characters based on physical characteristics, such as race, sex, hair color, eye color, weight, etc. Employment discrimination claims for Disparate Treatment are rare in the entertainment industry, specifically in performers.This justification is unique to the entertainment industry, and does not transfer to other industries, such as retail or food.

Often, employers will use BFOQ as a defense to a Disparate Treatment theory employment discrimination. BFOQ cannot be a cost justification in wage gaps between different groups of employees. Cost can be considered when an employer must balance privacy and safety concerns with the number of positions that an employer are trying to fill.

Additionally, customer preference alone cannot be a justification unless there is a privacy or safety defense. For instance, retail establishments in rural areas cannot prohibit African American clerks based on the racial ideologies of the customer base. But, matching genders for staffing at facilities that handle children survivors of sexual abuse is permitted.

If an employer were attempting to prove that employment discrimination was based on a BFOQ, there must be a factual basis for believing that all or substantially all members of a class would be unable to perform the job safely and efficiently or that it is impractical to determine qualifications on an individualized basis. Additionally, absence of a malevolent motive does not convert a facially discriminatory policy into a neutral policy with a discriminatory effect. Employers also carry the burden to show that a BFOQ is reasonably necessary, and a lesser discriminatory alternative method does not exist.

=== Religious employment discrimination ===
“Religious discrimination is treating individuals differently in their employment because of their religion, their religious beliefs and practices, and/or their request for accommodation (a change in a workplace rule or policy) of their religious beliefs and practices. It also includes treating individuals differently in their employment because of their lack of religious belief or practice” (Workplace Fairness). According to The U.S. Equal Employment Opportunity Commission, employers are prohibited from refusing to hire an individual based on their religion- alike race, sex, age, and disability. If an employee believes that they have experienced religious discrimination, they should address this to the alleged offender. On the other hand, employees are protected by the law for reporting job discrimination and are able to file charges with the EEOC. Some locations in the U.S. now have clauses that ban discrimination against atheists. The courts and laws of the United States give certain exemptions in these laws to businesses or institutions that are religious or religiously-affiliated, however, to varying degrees in different locations, depending on the setting and the context; some of these have been upheld and others reversed over time.

The most recent and pervasive example of Religious Discrimination is the widespread rejection of the COVID-19 Vaccine. Many employees are using religious beliefs against altering the body and preventative medicine as a justification to not receive the vaccination. Companies that do not allow employees to apply for religious exemptions, or reject their application may be charged by the employee with employment discrimination on the basis of religious beliefs. However, there are certain requirements for employees to present evidence that it is a sincerely held belief.

According to a report released by the Council on American-Islamic Relations (CAIR), Complaints related to employment discrimination were the most common complaint, at 15.4 percent, out of 8,658 complaints related to anti-Islamic and anti-Arab incidents in 2024.

=== Members of the Communist Party ===
Title VII of the Civil Rights Act of 1964 explicitly permits discrimination against members of the Communist Party.

=== Military ===
The military has faced criticism for prohibiting women from serving in combat roles. In 2016, however, the law was amended to allow them to serve. In the article posted on the PBS website, Henry Louis Gates Jr. writes about the way in which black men were treated in the military during the 1940s. According to Gates, during that time the whites gave the African Americans a chance to prove themselves as Americans by having them participate in the war. The National Geographic website states, however, that when black soldiers joined the Navy, they were only allowed to work as servants; their participation was limited to the roles of mess attendants, stewards, and cooks. Even when African Americans wanted to defend the country they lived in, they were denied the power to do so.

The Uniformed Services Employment and Reemployment Rights Act (USERRA) protects the job rights of individuals who voluntarily or involuntarily leave employment positions to undertake military service or certain types of service in the National Disaster Medical System. The law also prohibits employers from discriminating against employees for past or present participation or membership in the uniformed services. Policies that give preference to veterans versus non-veterans has been alleged to impose systemic disparate treatment of women because there is a vast underrepresentation of women in the uniformed services. The court has rejected this claim because there was no discriminatory intent towards women in this veteran friendly policy.

== Unintentional discrimination ==
Employment practices that do not directly discriminate against a protected category may still be illegal if they produce a disparate impact on members of a protected group. Title VII of the Civil Rights Act of 1964 prohibits employment practices that have a discriminatory impact, unless they are related to job performance.

The Act requires the elimination of artificial, arbitrary, and unnecessary barriers to employment that operate invidiously to discriminate on the basis of race, and, if, as here, an employment practice that operates to exclude Negroes cannot be shown to be related to job performance, it is prohibited, notwithstanding the employer's lack of discriminatory intent.

Height and weight requirements have been identified by the EEOC as having a disparate impact on national origin minorities.

When defending against a disparate impact claim that alleges age discrimination, an employer, however, does not need to demonstrate necessity; rather, it must simply show that its practice is reasonable.

== Enforcing entities ==
The Equal Employment Opportunity Commission (EEOC) interprets and enforces the Equal Pay Act, Age Discrimination in Employment Act, Title VII of the Civil Rights Act of 1964, Title I and V of the Americans With Disabilities Act, Sections 501 and 505 of the Rehabilitation Act, and the Civil Rights Act of 1991. The Commission was established by the Civil Rights Act of 1964. Its enforcement provisions are contained in section 2000e-5 of Title 42, and its regulations and guidelines are contained in Title 29 of the Code of Federal Regulations, part 1614. Persons wishing to file suit under Title VII and/or the ADA must exhaust their administrative remedies by filing an administrative complaint with the EEOC prior to filing their lawsuit in court.

The Office of Federal Contract Compliance Programs enforces Section 503 of the Rehabilitation Act, which prohibits discrimination against qualified individuals with disabilities by federal contractors and subcontractors.

Under Section 504 of the Rehabilitation Act, each agency has and enforces its own regulations that apply to its own programs and to any entities that receive financial assistance.

The Office of Special Counsel for Immigration-Related Unfair Employment Practices (OSC) enforces the anti-discrimination provisions of the Immigration and Nationality Act (INA), 8 U.S.C. § 1324b, which prohibits discrimination based on citizenship status or national origin.

State Fair Employment Practices (FEP) offices take the role of the EEOC in administering state statutes.

== See also ==
- Employment Non-Discrimination Act
- LGBT employment discrimination in the United States
- Employment discrimination against persons with criminal records in the United States
- Racial wage gap in the United States
- Gender pay gap in the United States
- Criticism of credit scoring systems in the United States
