= Andrea Ritchie =

American activist and author

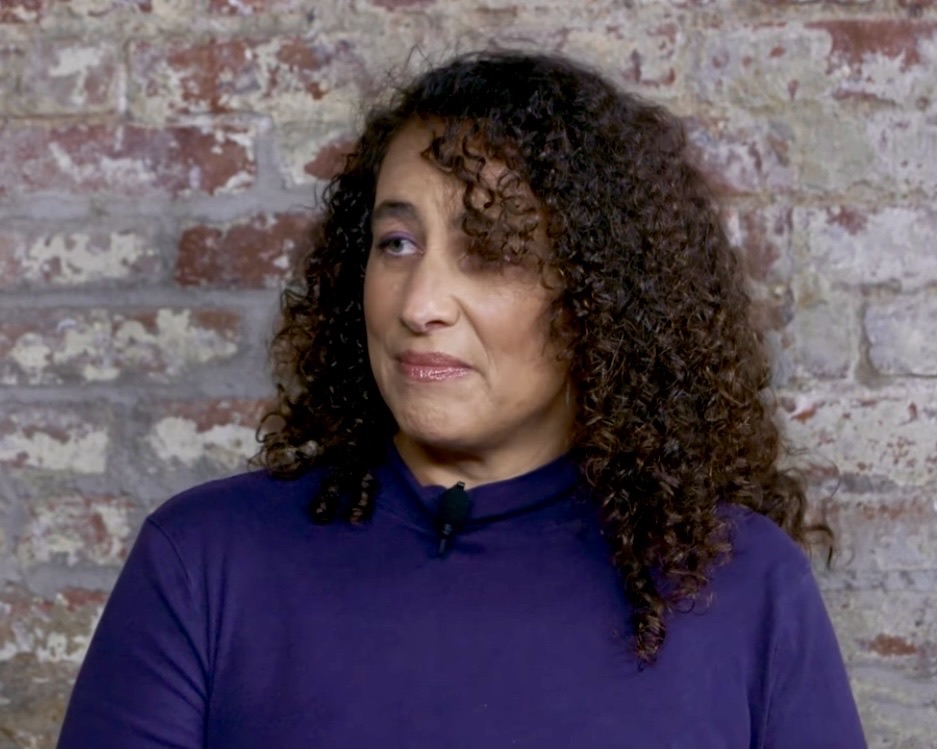
- Ritchie in 2018
- Education: Howard University (JD)
- Occupations: Author, lawyer, activist
- Notable work: Invisible No More

Andrea J. Ritchie is a writer, lawyer, and activist for women of color, especially LGBTQ women of color, who have been victims of police violence. She is the author of Invisible No More, a history of state violence against women of color, and co-author of No More Police: A Case for Abolition with Mariame Kaba.

== Education ==
Ritchie graduated from Howard University School of Law. She clerked for Judge Emmet G. Sullivan on the United States District Court for the District of Columbia.

== Career ==
Ritchie is a researcher-in-residence at the Social Justice Institute at the Barnard Center for Research on Women. Her writing has appeared in The New York Times, Teen Vogue, and Essence. In 2015, Ritchie co-authored the report Say Her Name: Resisting Police Brutality Against Black Women with Kimberlé Crenshaw, Rachel Anspach, Rachel Gilmer, and Luke Harris. In 2022 she published No More Police: A Case for Abolition, which she co-authored with Mariame Kaba.

=== Invisible No More ===
In 2017, Ritchie published Invisible No More: Police Violence Against Black Women and Women of Color. In it, she gives a history of often-obscured state violence against women of color in the United States, beginning in the colonial period and continuing through the present, discussing how the historical precedent established current conditions. She ties practices of colonialism, slavery, and Jim Crow laws to contemporary policing frameworks including broken windows policing and the wars on drugs, immigration, and terror. In a review for Policing and Society, Robert Nicewarner finds four major contributions: demonstrating the historically contingent and structural nature of police violence against women of color; developing “mixed” methodology interweaving statistics and personal stories; demonstrating the insufficiency of police response to violence against women of color; and demonstrating the “dire need to resist and reform” these issues.

== Books ==
- Queer (In)Justice: The Criminalization of LGBT People in the United States, co-authored with Joey Mogul and Kay Whitlock, Beacon Press, 2012. ISBN 9780807051153
- Invisible No More: Police Violence Against Black Women and Women of Color, Beacon Press, 2017. ISBN 9780807088982
- No More Police: A Case of Abolition, co-authored with Mariame Kaba, The New Press, 2022. ISBN 9781620977323
- Practicing New Worlds: Abolition and Emergent Strategies, AK Press, 2023. ISBN 9781849355117
