= Killing of Antwon Rose Jr. =

2018 fatal police shooting in Pennsylvania

- Date: June 19, 2018
- Time: 8:40 p.m. (EDT)
- Location: East Pittsburgh, Pennsylvania, United States
- Cause: Gunshot wounds
- Filmed by: Bystander mobile phone
- Outcome: Officer found not guilty
- Deaths: Antwon Rose II
- Injuries: Gun shot wounds
- Suspects: Michael Rosfeld
- Charges: Criminal homicide
- Verdict: Defendant acquitted of all charges
- Publication bans: Pre-trial gag order issued September 10, 2018

Antwon Rose II was a 17-year-old African-American who was fatally shot in East Pittsburgh on June 19, 2018, by East Pittsburgh Police Department officer Michael Rosfeld after being suspected of attempted murder by participating in a drive-by shooting. According to the police report, Rose had an empty handgun magazine in his pocket and gunshot residue on his hand. Allegheny County medical examiner Daniel Wolfe said the residue was likely the result of Rose firing a gun. He was transported to UPMC McKeesport, where he was later declared deceased.

Following the shooting, Rosfeld was charged with criminal homicide and was found not guilty. In August 2018, Rose’s family filed a civil rights lawsuit against Rosfeld and the borough of East Pittsburgh. The family alleged racial bias, lack of training, and use of excessive force. The suit was settled in October 2019 for $2 million.

== Background ==
Antwon Rose II was 17 years old when he died. He had worked as a community volunteer and was a student at Woodland Hills High School, where he took Advanced Placement classes. According to the family attorney, Rose had no significant criminal record prior to his death. His mother had been a clerk for another police department. His maternal grandfather had been a police officer for more than 35 years in a different jurisdiction.

Michael Rosfeld, the officer involved in the shooting, had been sworn in to the East Pittsburgh Police Department only a few hours before the shooting, and trained with the department for three weeks prior. He had seven years experience with other police departments, including those in the Pennsylvania towns of Oakmont and Harmar, and the University of Pittsburgh. Rosfeld left the University of Pittsburgh "after discrepancies were found between one of his sworn statements and evidence in an arrest".

== Shooting ==
On June 19, 2018, a drive-by shooting occurred in North Braddock around 8:30 p.m. 10 minutes later, Rosfeld pulled over a car matching witness descriptions of a silver Chevrolet Cruze used in the drive-by shooting. The police observed bullet holes on the side of the car.

A video recording taken by a bystander shows Rosfeld ordering the driver to step out from the car. While the driver was being handcuffed, Rose and the third occupant, Zaijuan Hester, ran from the car. Rosfeld fired three rounds, and Rose was struck by all three. He was pronounced dead at McKeesport Hospital.

In the video, a woman's voice is heard saying, "Why they shooting at him? All they did was run, and they shooting at them."[sic] Police said that Rose had been unarmed when he was shot. Hester escaped, but was later arrested.

=== Earlier drive-by shooting ===
Hester was charged with the drive by shooting. The Pittsburgh Post-Gazette published video footage showing Rose in the front passenger seat of a Chevrolet Cruze, while Hester fired through the rear window behind him. Contradicting that video evidence, drive-by victim William Ross told investigators on January 17, 2019, that Rose was in fact the individual who had shot him: "The beef was between me and him, that car came by, he shot me, I ran to the store."

Allegheny County district attorney Stephen Zappala stated that Rose had an empty 9-millimeter handgun magazine in his pocket, and officials stated there were two guns in the car, a 9-millimeter handgun and a .40-caliber handgun. According to police, Hester had fired the .40-caliber handgun.

Trial testimony from a scientist at the Allegheny County Medical Examiner's Office showed that Rose had gunshot residue on his hands at the time he was shot and his DNA was found on the 9mm pistol found under the passenger seat. Allegheny County medical examiner Daniel Wolfe said the residue didn't necessarily mean Rose fired a gun, though it is likely he did. During the trial, Rosfeld's attorney additionally claimed that Rose had stolen one of the handguns found in the car during an armed robbery of his employer just hours before he was shot. However, this was ruled inadmissible by Judge Alexander Bicket, as information regarding the gun theft was unknown to Rosfeld when he conducted the felony traffic stop.

== Indictments ==
Rosfeld was placed on leave and the Allegheny County Police Department began an investigation. The Allegheny County Medical Examiner's Office later classified Rose's death as a homicide and said that Rose died of a gunshot wound to the torso.

On June 26, Rosfeld was arrested and charged with criminal homicide, after detectives stated that there were inconsistencies in the officer's testimony. Rosfeld was released on bail by the district judges overseeing the case and according to authorities appeared remorseful during interviews. Rosfeld was charged with criminal homicide, was arraigned, and had unsecured bail set at $250,000. His trial began on March 19, 2019 and concluded on March 22, 2019. Rosfeld was found not guilty of criminal homicide.

Hester was arrested on June 26, 2018 and detained at the Shuman Juvenile Detention Center. Police stated that Hester had been on juvenile probation and had cut his ankle bracelet. Hester was charged with aggravated assault, criminal homicide, receiving stolen property, and firearm charges.

== Reactions ==
The Washington Post reported that Rose was the first person killed by the East Pittsburgh Police Department since at least 2015. On June 25, Pittsburgh Mayor Bill Peduto told reporters "there should be a trial” before a jury regarding the death of the young man and the fate of the police officer. On July 30, it was calculated that the Pittsburgh Police force paid out over $1 million in overtime for forces who monitored protests.

=== Protests ===
==== June 2018 ====
Protests attended by hundreds of people were held on June 20 and June 21 in front of the Allegheny County Courthouse in Downtown Pittsburgh. On the night of June 22, protestors marching on the Parkway East freeway slowed traffic for miles; subsequent protests took place near PNC Park on Pittsburgh's North Shore and in Pittsburgh's South Side neighborhood. A visiting for Rose was held on June 24, and his funeral held at the Woodland Hills Middle School on June 25.

==== July 2018 ====
The preliminary hearing for the officer was relocated to the Allegheny County Courthouse due to security concerns given the continued protests in the city. On July 8, while protesting on Route 30 in North Versailles, four protestors were hit by a car that drove through the march. One person was arrested and one person was taken to the hospital. The protests continued, with the goal of bringing visibility to and awareness of the shooting. On July 26, Pittsburgh city officials issued a new protest policy due to continued disruption of the city's roadways and bridges. This policy does not prohibit protests, but does prohibit unpermitted protestors from blocking traffic or shutting down specific "red zone" areas, and during limited high-traffic times in "yellow zone" areas. On July 27, protestors at Grant Street and Forbes Avenue confronted the Public Safety Director and Police Chief. One of the protestors, Nicky Jo Dawson, complained that the new policy "put further restrictions on people who are peacefully protesting against an oppressive system."

==== March 2019 ====
Following the trial of Rosfeld, multiple demonstrations took place. The largest was three days after the trial on March 25, in which over a thousand people marched through the streets of Downtown Pittsburgh. The march was escorted by the police. This protest coincided with a walkout of schools and universities, including Chatham University, the University of Pittsburgh, Taylor Allderdice High School, and Obama Academy. Smaller protests took place after, in which protestors occupied businesses and disrupted traffic.

=== 2018 Community birthday celebration ===
On July 12, 2018, members of Rose's community in Rankin, Pennsylvania came together to celebrate his 18th birthday. The celebration was motivated by his mother as a way to bring the community together. The event offered food for participants, and the organizers donated 250 backpacks of books to members of the community.

== Civil Rights Lawsuit ==
Rose's family filed a civil rights lawsuit against the Borough of East Pittsburgh and Rosfeld. They were represented by John Coyle of McEldrew Purtell in Philadelphia, Lee Merritt of The Merritt Law Firm in Dallas, and Fred and Monte Rabner of Rabner Law Office in Pittsburgh. In 2019, the case settled for $2M which the New York Times reported as the maximum the Borough could pay under their insurance policy.

== See also ==
- List of unarmed African Americans killed by law enforcement officers in the United States
- List of killings by law enforcement officers in the United States, June 2018
- List of killings by law enforcement officers in the United States
