= Missing Daddy =

2019 children's book by Mariame Kaba

- Author: Mariame Kaba
- Illustrator: bria royal
- Language: English
- Genre: Children's Picture Book
- Publisher: Haymarket Books
- Publication date: September 3, 2019
- Publication place: United States
- ISBN: 978-1-64259-036-4

Missing Daddy is a 2018 children's picture book written by Mariame Kaba and illustrated by bria royal, originally self-published by Mariame Kaba in 2018 and then republished in hardcover by Haymarket Books in 2019. The book was written by Kaba to add to her mission regarding the abolition of the prison industrial system including the police and providing justice to those who were wrongly incarcerated. Kaba wanted to provide materials to children that were age appropriate and reflected the emotions that they may be facing when struggling with the incarceration of a parent.

Kaba works on the issues of racial, gender, and transformative justice. She has served on multiple committees and boards regarding the efforts of reformation of the justice system such as Violence Against Women, Black Scholar and We Charge Genocide. Kaba worked with Royal to create Missing Daddy. Royal wanted to illustrate the book as such the characters had darker complexions because she felt that there had been a tone lightening in the media regarding the black population. She wanted children of the same darker complexion as the protagonist to feel seen and represented.

== Plot ==
A child nicknamed Light Bug by her daddy is describing the aftereffects of her father's imprisonment when she was three. Light Bug is made fun of within her classes and called a criminal by proxy due to her father's incarceration. Light Bug experiences waves of tears and sadness due to the loss of their father and the discrimination they face as a victim of circumstance. Light Bug has formed a closer attachment to their mother and are often left feeling down because their mother has to work harder and more hours so that they can make ends meet and have basic needs. Light Bug's teachers provide reassurance that there are many varieties of family types and dynamics. They explain that just because hers is different than the normal doesn't mean that Light Bug has any less love in her life. Light Bug also talks to their counselor to reflect upon their father's incarceration and how it has affected her life. But at other times, Light Bug just doesn't want to think about it and instead focuses on their interests like dance. Visiting day finally arrives and after a long and arduous bus ride Light Bug is inundated with happiness that leads to feelings similar to fireworks being set off at seeing her father again. The story concludes with an image of a grown Light Bug retelling her story through the form of poetry.

== Themes ==
=== Mental health ===
The theme of mental health was presented throughout the story as a broader concept than the singularity of the main character. The protagonist was portrayed as a child having mental health issues due to the absence of her father. This led the child to struggle within school and to connect with their mother and peers. The child was ostracized for being a criminal by proxy. The ostracization of Light Bug adds to the sense of loneliness in both the physical and mental sense. Physical due to the lack of community within school and also an additional feeling of being alone as the child has no one to connect with and talk to or someone who empathizes with the incarceration of a parent. This is backed by the theory of Person-Context. The mental health struggles led Light Bug to speak with the school counselor. The conversation draws attention the need of more importance placed children in their on the developmental years and their mental health needs that are often overlooked. This conversation also destigmatizes therapy and makes it so that children learn from an early age that therapy isn't a bad thing and can help you through your problem. Kaba stresses the concept on self-education in this therapy session as it highlights the importance of being aware that there are others facing the same issues as you are most likely only three degrees of separation away. This is additionally reinforced by showing that Light Bug was progressing into a happier state after her therapy session as she was able to come to terms with her situation and the fact she wasn't alone.

=== Incarceration ===
The theme of incarceration is displayed throughout the book in a multitude of ways. The first being as the actual act of being incarcerated. The protagonist's father was incarcerated when they were three. This led the child to have a distorted sense of childhood as they were forced to grow up in an unconventional family system. This also attributed to a sense of resentment towards the primary parent, in this case the mother, because they weren't the father who the child so desperately wanted. The child was called a criminal in school because she was related to someone who was arrested. This demonstrated the other side of incarceration which is the societal aspect and how negatively the world tends to view those who have been incarcerated or are related to those who are incarcerated. The story reflects on the yearning that the child has to see their father again. Through the entirety of the book the child wants nothing more than to see their father again. This then gets resolved by the finale where the child gets to visit their father in prison and sees that nothing has changed with how he treats her and that she is still his "Light Bug". This reflects on how misconstrued the portrayal of incarceration is and that not everyone who is incarcerated is a bad person and just may be a person who has done a bad thing.
