= Non-reformist reform =

Reforms that challenge the existing power structure

Non-reformist reform, also referred to as abolitionist reform, anti-capitalist reform, revolutionary reform, structural reform and transformative reform, is a reform that "is conceived, not in terms of what is possible within the framework of a given system and administration, but in view of what should be made possible in terms of human needs and demands". On the other hand, reformist reforms essentially maintain the status quo and do not threaten the existing structure. These have been described as reforms that rationalize or "fine-tune the status quo" by implementing modifications "from the top down", but that fail to address root causes of the issue. As described by philosopher André Gorz, who coined the term non-reformist reform, non-reformist reforms in a capitalist system are anti-capitalist reforms, or reforms that do not base their validity and their right to exist "on capitalist needs, criteria, and rationale", but rather on human ones.

Non-reformist reforms have been identified as reforms that "challenge existing power relations and pave the way for more revolutionary changes in the larger society necessary for a more socially just and environmentally sustainable world", those that create and recreate "the capacity to cumulatively transform the existing system" and those that abolish and undermine the very foundations of the existing structure. Scholars identify that for this to truly be possible, these reforms cannot "be taken for the poor or the racialized" under the assumption that "those deemed poor or racialized are not able to take action themselves". In other words, the marginalized cannot be "passive agents" in the process, but must be transformative subjects who "are active in reordering social relationships, diagnosing social inequalities, and mobilizing for a better way of socially organizing the world".

== Challenges ==
Creating non-reformist reforms is often cited as difficult. One challenge to creating non-reformist reform is the risk of co-option, incorporation and depoliticization, or mainstreaming, of the demands of social movements. Lawyer and activist Dean Spade identifies mainstreaming as "when a very oppressive harmful institution tries to use an emptied-out version of [for example] queer politics as a PR stunt for itself, but queer people don't get anything out of it". Spade states that mainstreaming can be identified when "new forms of visibility" for the social justice issue in question become visible, but only under a form of "conditional acceptance" or respectability to the dominant system. Mainstreaming results in the "deployment of 'deserving' figures" in which a select group of people who the social justice issue pertains to become cast as "hardworking", "professionals", or "things that are tolerable" to the dominant system while others are simultaneously cast as "undeserving" and are excluded. Mainstreaming then produces reformist reform or recuperative reform proposals that reinforce or recuperate harmful institutions while the harm and violence actually continues. Janet Newman states that "women's claims for equality [in the new social movements of the 1960s and 1970s] had been incorporated through processes of 'mainstreaming' that have served to bureaucratize and depoliticize feminism".

Another challenge to creating non-reformist reform is the difficulty to avoid expanding the system one is attempting to reform. An attempt to implement a non-reformist reform may become reformist in its implementation, for "some factors leading to the growth of the prison industry were the direct result of attempts to reform the system", as described by scholar Liat Ben-Moshe. In many instances, public and activist efforts to change the conditions inherent to the prison system eventually resulted in the expansion of the prison system. Marie Gottschalk cites three examples to illustrate how this occurs in relation to the prison system: (1) "opposition to the death penalty brought forth life sentences without parole, and helped strengthen the deterrence argument in crime control discourse, (2) LGBT activists fighting against homophobic and transphobic violence helped in creating hate crime legislation that incarcerated people for longer time frames, and (3) Moms against Gun Violence ushered in gun control measures that also increased the net effect of the penal system, including surveillance measures on communities of color". In consideration of this phenomenon, Ben-Moshe identifies that the perpetuation of this problem may reside in activists "not reaching far enough, not engaging enough in coalitional and revolutionary politics that will address the root causes of harm" and may also be unknowingly perpetuated by those who have internalized "the state in their actions and interactions".

=== Criteria for identification ===
In consideration of the challenges to creating non-reformist reform that scholars identify, activists have established criteria for identifying when a reform may be reformist or non-reformist. Notable activists and organizations who have established criteria include Dean Spade, Peter Gelderloos, Harsha Walia, Critical Resistance and Mariame Kaba, who propose the following criteria respectively:

Dean Spade

- Does it provide material relief?
- Does it leave out an especially marginalized part of the affected group (e.g. people with criminal records, people without immigration status)?
- Does it legitimize or expand a system we are trying to dismantle?
- Does it mobilize the most affected for an ongoing struggle?

Peter Gelderloos

- Does it seize space in which new social relations can be enacted?
- Does it spread awareness of its ideas? (participatory, not passive)
- Does it have elite support?
- Does it achieve any concrete gains in improving people's lives?

Harsha Walia

- Has the tactic been effective in exposing or confronting a specific point within the system by either diminishing its moral legitimacy or undermining its functions?

Critical Resistance

- Will it expand the system we are trying to dismantle?
- Will we have to undo this later?

Marbre Stahly-Butts

- Does this reform shift any power or resources?
- Does it, in some way, acknowledge past harm?
- Does it improve material conditions?
- Does it create space for experimentation?
- Are we able to try something new or different as a result?

Mariame Kaba, in regard to police reform

- Does it allocate more money to the police?
- Does it advocate for more police and policing?
- Is the reform primarily technology-focused?
- Is it focused on individual dialogues with individual cops?

== Reformist reform examples ==
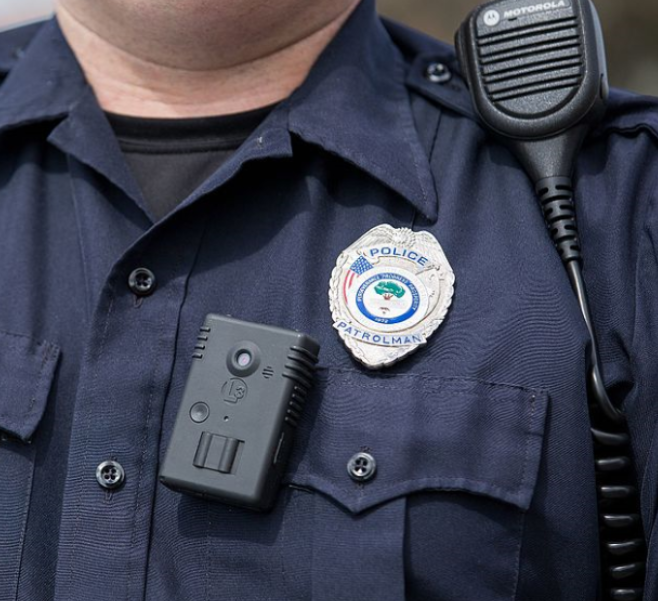
Police body cameras have been identified as a reformist reform by scholars because they have expanded the power of the carceral state while failing to address the root issue of police brutality in the United States.

Hate crime laws have been identified as an example of reformist reform because they add "punishing power" to institutions, often by including "more money for local law enforcement" and sometimes including "different types of data gathering" measures, as stated by lawyer and activist Dean Spade. While on the surface they may appear beneficial, Spade argues that for trans people arguing for more hate crime laws actually works to "produce the idea that police punishment systems are there to protect trans people, when in reality the largest source of violence for trans people, is those very systems". As Spade states, it allows "the criminal punishment system to be able to say: 'we're here to protect trans people.' Meanwhile, it continues to be a thing that kills trans people".

Anti-bullying legislation has been identified by scholars and activists as a reformist reform by enhancing the power "of school punishment programs to target students of color". The argument is that they have not reduced or made school environments safer, but rather have functioned as a punitive framework for students and youth.

The criminalization of domestic violence has been identified as an example of reformist reform. The demands of a feminist social movement to name domestic violence as violence were taken by the criminal punishment system which funded efforts to combat domestic violence through "enhancing punishment for people who do it". This racially divided the feminist movement as white feminists became more likely to support law enforcement and the criminal justice system while women of color feminists and Indigenous feminists asserted that this system would not protect them or their communities, for "[w]e don't feel comfortable calling the cops, the cops will come and they'll deport us, they'll arrest all of us". This led to the development of what has been termed carceral feminism in which the criminal justice system was able to present itself as protecting women. Dean Spade identifies that "sexual violence happens at the hands of the police inside the correctional system, perhaps more than anywhere else" and criminalization has not addressed the root cause of domestic violence.

Police body cameras and police dashboard cameras have been identified as reformist reforms that strengthened the power of the carceral state. Scientist Ardea Skybreak argues that body cameras have been identified as reformist because they "tinker with the system" rather than address that police brutality is "deeply rooted in the fabric of this system, in its very foundation, which has everything to do with the white supremacist origins of this particular society in the United States [...] that requires that certain sections of society be kept down and oppressed".

Civilian review boards have been identified as a reformist reform because they have not fundamentally altered the outcomes of policing despite being implemented in some locations since the 1960s. Scholar Suleiman Osman identifies how these civilian police oversight agencies were widely supported by reformists who "were confident that they could allay the fears of white ethnic voters by organizing town hall meetings and open debates", but instead were met with opposition from "a populist conservative insurgency".

Policies and rights frameworks regarding sexual orientation and gender identity in military service have been identified as reformist reforms that gained popularity among reformist sectors of the gay and lesbian community since the election of Bill Clinton in 1992. Harm and violence to gay and lesbian people within the military has been recognized as pervasive. At the same time, as described by scholar Nicola Field, "the discipline of capitalist military forces means that even if they allow lesbians and gays to serve, they cannot suddenly become a force for freedom, equality, and liberation".

Gay marriage laws have been identified as an example of a reformist reform because it "leaves intact institutions of state violence by 'rejecting those objectives and demands—however deep the need for them—which are incompatible with the system". Although gay marriage has been recognized as providing important rights and protections to gay people, "it does not contest the violences imposed by institutionalized heteropatriarchy, including the police killings of transgender women of color". In other words, gay marriage laws have been identified as reformist reforms because they do not strive to eradicate the institutionalization of marriage law itself which perpetuates cisheteropatriarchal violence, but rather extends it.

== Non-reformist reform examples ==
The prison abolition movement and empowering of communities to engage in restorative practices function as an example of non-reformist reform by activists such as Mariame Kaba. Kaba states that non-reformist reform in this regard would mean the creation of a new structure that "will allow people to feel safe, have their needs met, on our way to an abolitionist end".

Degrowth has been proposed as an example of a non-reformist approach to transforming capitalist society. Petridis, Muraca and Kallis identify that the gradual implementation of "environmental policies (resource and CO_{2} caps, extraction limits), social policies (basic income, maximum income, social security guarantees, reduced working hours), and economic proposals (social enterprises and cooperative firms, ethical banks, environmental taxation)" as well as more transformative proposals such as "the restriction on advertisement and the creation of commerce-free zones" are non-reformist steps to transferring from capitalist society to a degrowth society.

Individual and collectivist challenges to the hegemony of the private car have been proposed as examples of non-reformist reforms intended to create "a more socially just and environmentally sustainable world". Eliminating one's driving in favor of a bicycle is an example of a non-reformist approach on an individual level. Expanding public transportation services and restricting individual automobile use has been proposed as an example of a non-reformist reform on a collectivist level.

In a hypothetical example, scholar Brian Martin states "a strike for higher wages might simply buy off discontent and solidify capitalist control: it is a reform that strengthens the system. In contrast, pushing for greater worker control over shop-floor decisions can lay the basis for further worker initiatives: it is an example of non-reformist reform".
