= List of killings by law enforcement officers in the United States, June 2018 =

This is a list of people reported killed by non-military law enforcement officers in the United States in June 2018, whether in the line of duty or not, and regardless of reason or method. The listing documents the occurrence of a death, making no implications regarding wrongdoing or justification on the part of the person killed or officer involved. Killings are arranged by date of the incident that caused death. Different death dates, if known, are noted in the description. The table below lists 88 people.

== June 2018 ==
Date	Name and age of deceased	Race	State (city)	Description
2018-06-29	Randy Thomas Groom (33)	White	Lawrenceburg, TN	
2018-06-29	Garry Glenn Lawrence Jr. (36)	White	North Pole, AK	
2018-06-29	Jason Erik Washington	Black	Oregon (Portland)	
2018-06-29	Antonio Sanchez (36)	Hispanic	Aurora, CO	
2018-06-29	Chukwumankpam Mbegbu (19)	Black	Arizona (Phoenix)	
2018-06-29	Steven Ballard (56)	White	Waterford, MI	
2018-06-29	Rodney Lee Hunter (27)	Black	Pomona, CA	
2018-06-28	James Palmquist (54)	White	Dade City, FL	
2018-06-28	Katie Lovett Sasser (34)	White	Darien, GA	
2018-06-28	Johnny Edward Hall Jr. (39)	White	Darien, GA	
2018-06-28	Joshua Kenneth James Cartwright (36)	White	Russellville, AR	
2018-06-28	Timothy Jason Coffman (36)	White	South Daytona, FL	
2018-06-27	Joey Bronson (29)	Black	Colorado (Aurora)	Bronson was shot while fleeing police. Police claim a gun was recovered "near" where Bronson came to lay. He was taken to a hospital where he died later that day. In a month the officer involved, Drew Limbaugh, would go on to kill Richard "Gary" Black, Jr. He wasn't charged for either incident.
2018-06-25	James Sorrentino (37)	Unknown race	Prompton, PA	
2018-06-25	Bobby Louis Blade (29)	White	Dallas, TX	
2018-06-25	Luis Argueta (18)	Hispanic	Galveston, TX	
2018-06-25	William Shawn Mann (30)	White	Grenada, MS	
2018-06-23	Eric K. Sweet (47)	White	Coos Bay, OR	
2018-06-23	Robert Lyle Barton (48)	White	Meridian, ID	
2018-06-23	Steven Allan Kaluahinui Hyer Jr. (32)	Native Hawaiian and Pacific Islander	Haleiwa, HI	
2018-06-23	Thurman Blevins (31)	Black	Minnesota (Minneapolis)	Police responded to a call of a man outdoors firing a gun into the air. On arriving, they found Blevins, armed, who began to run away. Blevins was shot in the back during a foot chase.
2018-06-23	Andrew Allen Paine (38)	Unknown race	Centennial, CO	
2018-06-23	Detandel Pickens Devon (25)	Black	Monroe, LA	
2018-06-23	Joe Darwish	White	San Diego, CA	
2018-06-22	Timothy Deal (32)	Black	Atlantic City, NJ	
2018-06-22	Thomas Albun Beall Jr. (31)	White	Harrisonburg, VA	
2018-06-22	Schuyler Lake (20)	White	Albany, NY	
2018-06-22	Logan A. Williamson (37)	White	Fairfield, OH	
2018-06-22	Javier Desantiago (31)	Hispanic	Inglewood, CA	
2018-06-20	Anthony "Punch" Marcell Green (33)	Black	Kingsland, GA	
2018-06-20	Jonathan Legg (29)	Unknown race	Parma Heights, OH	
2018-06-20	Jesse Wade Powell (44)	White	Bend, OR	
2018-06-19	Antwon Rose Jr. (17)	Black	Pennsylvania (East Pittsburgh)	See Shooting of Antwon Rose Jr.
2018-06-19	Robert Roybal (55)	White	Tucumcari, NM	
2018-06-19	Jonathon Buckley (21)	Black	Stone Mountain, GA	
2018-06-19	Charles Luther Spillers (65)	White	Cumming, GA	
2018-06-18	Ryan Angerstien (30)	White	Akron, OH	
2018-06-17	Tahaji Wells (33)	Black	Trenton, NJ	
2018-06-17	Abe Martinez (44)	Hispanic	South Salt Lake, UT	
2018-06-16	Guillermo Perez (32)	Hispanic	Los Angeles, CA	
2018-06-16	Elizabeth Michele Tollison (49)	White	Los Angeles, CA	
2018-06-16	Michael Fletcher (53)	White	Arizona (Mesa)	
2018-06-16	Dwayne Clyburn (37)	Black	Warwick, NY	
2018-06-16	Ronald Barney (48)	White	Arizona (Phoenix)	
2018-06-16	Richard Rivera (47)	Hispanic	New Mexico (Albuquerque)	
2018-06-15	David L. Hicks (40)	White	Nokomis, IL	
2018-06-14	Joseph Villanueva (29)	Hispanic	Gainesville, GA	
2018-06-14	Robert A. White (34)	White	Kansas City, MO	
2018-06-14	Ashley D. Fulkerson aka Ashley Simonetti (28)	White	Kansas City, MO	
2018-06-14	Timothy Mosley (33)	Black	Kansas City, MO	
2018-06-14	Terrence Dewayne White Jr. (18)	Black	Nevada (Las Vegas)	White, who was in a stolen SUV with a stolen AR-15 rifle as well, was being pursued by police. White made a u-turn and accelerated his vehicle toward the officers. Officers responded by firing 58 times, which at least two struck White, killing him.
2018-06-14	Marcelo Castellano (40)	Hispanic	Kirkland, WA	
2018-06-14	Name Withheld	Unknown race	Denver, CO	
2018-06-13	Nathaniel Adams McCoy Sr. (32)	Black	Carencro, LA	
2018-06-13	Carnell Nelson (29)	Black	Denver, CO	
2018-06-13	Dillan Shane Ezell (21)	White	Eustis, FL	
2018-06-12	Marqueese Alston (22)	Black	Washington, DC	
2018-06-12	Alexandre J. Aldrich (34)	White	Arizona (Phoenix)	
2018-06-12	Stephen Cogelia (32)	White	Hardwick, NJ	
2018-06-12	Chavius Hollis (26)	Black	Monroe, GA	
2018-06-12	DaNathe M. Gulliford (34)	Black	Danville, IL	
2018-06-11	Nicolas Moncada (20)	Hispanic	Whittier, CA	
2018-06-11	Robert Lawrence White (41)	Black	Silver Spring, MD	
2018-06-10	Brandon Vieweg (34)	White	Westminster, CO	
2018-06-09	Timothy Owen (49)	White	Temple, TX	
2018-06-09	LaShanda Anderson (36)	Black	Deptford, NJ	
2018-06-08	Michael Renfroe (36)	White	Canton, MS	
2018-06-08	Todd Gregory (47)	White	Hardwick, NJ	
2018-06-07	Douglas Conner (50)	White	Benton City, WA	
2018-06-07	Wes Allen (33)	White	New Mexico (Albuquerque)	
2018-06-07	Leslie Yolanda Salazar (20)	White	Austin, TX	
2018-06-07	Raymon Lee Truitt II (28)	Black	Gary, IN	
2018-06-06	Abraham Noe Flores (34)	White	Red Bluff, CA	
2018-06-06	Maurice Granton Jr. (24)	Black	Illinois (Chicago)	Police were conducting a narcotics operation when they confronted Granton, who was armed with a gun. Granton fled, dropping or throwing the gun; as he tried to climb over a fence, police shot him in the back.
2018-06-06	Alan Goyano (43)	Hispanic	New York (Merrick)	
2018-06-06	Roger Dale Sims (56)	White	Georgia (LaGrange)	
2018-06-06	Brian Puskas (47)	White	Ohio (Delaware)	
2018-06-05	Abel Guzman	Hispanic	Texas (Pearland)	
2018-06-05	Joshua Nash Bryant	White	North Carolina (Wilmington)	
2018-06-04	Joshua S. Stanford (40)	White	Springfield, MO	
2018-06-03	Rudy Molina (34)	Hispanic	Riverside, CA	
2018-06-03	Julio Eduardo Hernandez Mata (32)	Hispanic	Pocasset, OK	
2018-06-03	David Ponce ()	Hispanic	Mecca, CA	
2018-06-02	Shamir Deangelo Terry (39)	Black	Macon, GA	
2018-06-02	Gus Tousis (43)	Black	Illinois (Chicago)	
2018-06-01	Renie Cablay (55)	Native Hawaiian or Pacific Islander	Waipahu, HI	
2018-06-01	Juan Carlos Perez-Victor (38)	Hispanic	Torrance, CA	
2018-06-01	Andres Estrada (21)	Hispanic	Winter Haven, FL	

== See also ==
- Death in custody § United States
- Henry A. Wallace Police Crime Public Database
- List of cases of police brutality
- List of countries with annual rates and counts for killings by law enforcement officers
- List of law enforcement officers killed in the line of duty in the United States
- List of law enforcement officers convicted for an on-duty killing in the United States
- List of shootings by US immigration agents
- List of police reforms related to the George Floyd protests
- List of unarmed African Americans killed by law enforcement officers in the United States
- Lists of killings by law enforcement officers
- Police brutality in the United States
- Police misconduct § United States
- Police riot § United States
- Police use of deadly force in the United States
