= Free Spirit Media =

- Formation: 2001
- Type: Non-profit
- Legal status: 501(c)(3)
- Headquarters: 5100 W Harrison St, Chicago, IL 60644
- Region served: Chicago, IL
- Executive Director: Aurora Toshiko King
- Website: http://freespiritmedia.org

Free Spirit Media is a film and media organization based in Chicago, Illinois. With locations across the city, they focus primarily on the West and South Sides. Their mission is to provide education, access, and opportunity in media production to over 500 underserved urban youth every year.

== Programs ==
Free Spirit Media currently comprises two programs: Free Spirit Labs, or their Teen Program, and Creative Pathways, formerly Industry Pathways. While each program focuses on underserved and underrepresented young people in Chicago, the programs teach or develop different forms of media literacy and media creation in distinct ways.

== Work ==
=== Suspension stories ===
Suspension stories is an initiative resulting from a collaboration between the Project NIA and the Rogers Park Young Women's Action Team that collect stories about students involved with unfair Suspension and Expulsion primarily through videos. They have also filmed and gathered information from teachers and other school personnel.

== See also ==
- Project NIA
- Rogers Park Young Women's Action Team
- After School Matters
