= Rogers Park Young Women's Action Team =

The Rogers Park Young Women's Action Team (YWAT) was a group of primarily African-American high school females in Chicago who took action on social issues. They started out as a group of high school females working to end street harassment. Their primary mission was "to end violence against women and girls" and to "empower women to take action on issues that affect their lives (particularly issues of violence against girls and young women)." They primarily advocated for low-income women of color under 21 years of age. The group disbanded after completing its final project in 2011.

== Work ==
Rogers Park Young Women's Action Team (YWAT) combatting Street Sexual Harassment

Because of the problem of street harassment in Rogers Park, Chicago, a group of high school students decided to come together to end street harassment. According to the YWAT, they directly educated over 5,000 youth and adults about street harassment, healthy relationships, and in general about violence against girls and young women across the United States. They gathered data primarily through surveys. They primarily gathered information about domestic violence asking questions such as do you personally know a woman who has experienced male violence?

== Suspension stories ==
Suspension stories was an initiative resulting from the collaboration between the YWAT and Project NIA that collect stories about students involved with unfair Suspension and Expulsion primarily through videos They have also filmed and gathered information from teachers and other school personnel

== Engaging men ==
In June 2006, The YWAT started a project called Engaging Young Men as Allies to End Violence against Women and Girls. The beginning of the project consisted of a film. The film included interviews with young men, primarily African American and White. Young women who were personally impacted by male violence were also interviewed. A YWAT's male alley and classmate, collected over 45 surveys from young men. Another alley from Between Friends collected over 120 surveys. In total, the YWAT collected 226 surveys from young men ages 12–22. they summarized the key findings.

- 58% of young men respondents said that issues of violence against women and girls are ‘‘very important’‘ to them.
- 50.9% of survey respondents said that between 1 and 5 of their male friends or family members would be interested in getting involved in taking action on issues of violence against women and girls.
- 64.2% of young men surveyed have ever asked someone to stop using derogatory or negative terms to refer to girls and women (i.e. slut, ho, bitch).
- 52.7% respondents said that they had intervened during a physical confrontation between a boy and girl.
- 56.6% of young men who were surveyed personally knew between 1 to 5 girls and women who have experienced male violence.
- 52.2% said that 1 to 5 male friends or family members would suggest that women provoke the violence that they experience at the hands of men.
- 18.2% survey respondents have considered joining or working with organizations that actively confront sexism and take steps to prevent violence against women and girls.

They asked young men surveyed why they thought that more men are not involved in working to end violence against women and girls. Their answers was:

- 28.9%: Not important/not our issue
- 7.6%: Not enough time
- 23.1%: Never asked to be involved
- 40.4%: Don't know enough about the issues

== Members ==
- Shauniece Armstead, Von Steuben Metropolitan High School
- Shannon Bittner, Stephen Tyng Mather High School
- Renee Braggs, William Howard Taft High School
- Karia Campbell, Roger C. Sullivan High School
- Ronnett Lockett, Lane Tech College Prep High School
- Lillian Matamni, Lane Tech College Prep High School
- Jasmine Martinez, Gale Community Academy
- Christine Rene, Roger C. Sullivan High School
- Daphne Rene, Roger C. Sullivan High School
- Jackquette Smith Chicago Vocational High School
- Jonnae Taylor, Roger C. Sullivan High School
- Joyce Taylor, Roger C. Sullivan High School
- Crystal Villanueva, St. Scholastica Academy
- Ashley Ward, Lane Tech College Prep High School
- Emilya Whitis, Lane Tech College Prep High School
- Geri Whitis, Lane Tech College Prep High School

== See also ==
- Free Spirit Media
- Project NIA
- After School Matters
