= 2018 Los Angeles hostage incident =

Fatality-causing hostage situation at Trader Joe's

2018 Trader Joe's hostage incident
- Location: 34.1076°N 118.2715°W; Los Angeles, California, U.S.
- Date: July 21, 2018; 1:30 p.m. – 6:30 p.m. (UTC-8)
- Target: Trader Joe's supermarket
- Attack type: hostage taking
- Weapon: Firearm
- Deaths: 1 (killed by police)
- Injuries: 3 (including the perpetrator)
- Perpetrator: Gene Evin Atkins

On July 21, 2018, a hostage incident occurred at a Trader Joe's store in the Silver Lake neighborhood of Los Angeles. 28-year-old Gene Evin Atkins, armed and fleeing police, crashed into a utility pole and ran into the nearby store. He fired at two pursuing police officers during the pursuit and after the crash; the two officers, Sinlen Tse and Sarah Winans, returned fire in Atkins's direction, hitting and killing a store employee, Melyda Corado, and hitting Atkins in the left arm. After escaping into Trader Joe's, Atkins barricaded himself and the rest of the store's patrons and employees inside the store. By the end of the incident, Atkins was arrested for various criminal felonies.

Atkins's 78-year-old grandmother, Mary Elizabeth Madison, was shot seven times and was reported to be in critical condition. Another female hostage, the perpetrator's girlfriend, was grazed by a bullet.

In 2024, the city of Los Angeles agreed to pay $9.5 million to the family of Melyda Corado.

== Incident ==
Video by Los Angeles Police Department depicting portions of the incident

The shootings began on the evening of July 20, when Atkins' cousin spotted Atkins sleeping in his grandmother's home on 32nd Street near Long Beach Avenue with a gun under his pillow. According to a cousin of Atkins, Atkins, who had lived with his grandmother since he was a young child, had been quarreling with his grandmother over his live-in girlfriend. The grandmother did not want her living in the home. Atkins shot his grandmother and his girlfriend around 1:30 pm on July 21, then forced his girlfriend, who was bleeding from the gunshot wound, into his grandmother's car and drove off. Several people reported the incident and LAPD was dispatched. A police helicopter traced his car to the Hollywood area and responding officers gave chase for nearly fifteen minutes. According to the district attorney's memorandum, Atkins fired three shots during the pursuit, before crashing his grandmother's Toyota into a power pole in Silver Lake in front of the Trader Joe's supermarket on Hyperion Avenue at 3:30 pm.

Atkins emerged from his crashed car and fired three additional shots at the police who were pursuing him before running into the store. Two officers fired eight total shots (Tse five, Winans three) in Atkins direction, hitting and killing store employee Melyda Corado, according to LAPD police chief Michel Moore and the DA's memorandum. There were between 40 and 50 people inside the grocery store at the time.

Atkins held hostages inside the store for about three hours as police officers in tactical gear standing outside the store used mirrors to watch as hostage negotiators persuaded Atkins to release the hostages and surrender. Around 6:30 pm, he agreed to handcuff himself, and was led from the building accompanied by four hostages to ensure that he would not be shot. He was then taken into custody.

== Suspect ==
The suspect was identified as Gene Evin Atkins, a 28-year-old African-American male. He had lived with his grandmother since he was seven years old. According to his cousin, Atkins had recently lost his job and two cars. Atkins had previously slashed the tires on his grandmother's car and broke the windows in the house. The cousin described him as having a history of mental health problems and as a quiet man who was despondent about his future. She quoted him as having said, "The next thing I do, I'm going to die doing it or I'm going to jail."

He opened fire on the police, but no officers were reported injured. The gunman was arrested, charged with murder, and was initially held on $2 million bail.

== Legal proceedings ==
Atkins was charged in August 2018 with 51 crimes, including murder, two counts of attempted murder, four counts of attempted murder of a police officer, and several counts of false imprisonment of hostages. Bail was increased from $18.7 million to $23 million.

== Aftermath ==
The police officers have received criticism for inadvertently killing Corado with gunfire despite warnings from one officer who said to his partner, "Do not, do not shoot. We are going to keep our distance." Jill Leovy, a former police reporter for the Los Angeles Times, criticized the LAPD, saying, "This is about training and tactics and how to minimize injury in a fast-moving situation." She added, "It's about knowing that you have a clear shot, knowing what's in the background and periphery of the shot."

In December 2020, the LA County District Attorney's Office announced that it had determined the two officers were justified in using deadly force and would not face charges.

Melyda Corado's brother, Albert Corado, became a police abolition activist and ran unsuccessfully for Los Angeles City Council against incumbent Mitch O'Farrell.
