= Project NIA =

Project NIA is an American advocacy organization that supports youth in trouble with the law as well as those victimized by violence and crime, through community-based alternatives as opposed to formal legal proceedings. The organization was founded in 2009 by activist and educator Mariame Kaba, with the project aiming to end juvenile incarceration. NIA comes from a Swahili word for "with purpose".

== Suspension stories ==
Suspension stories is an initiative resulting from the collaboration between the Project NIA and the Rogers Park Young Women's Action Team that collect stories about students involved with unfair Suspension and Expulsion primarily through videos They have also filmed and gathered information from teachers and other school personnel

== See also ==
Rogers Park Young Women's Action Team
