= Crossroads Fund =

Public foundation

- Formation: 1981
- Type: Non-profit public foundation
- Headquarters: Chicago, Illinois, U.S.
- Location: 3411 W. Diversey Ave, Chicago, IL 60647
- Services: Grantmaking, technical assistance, community organizing
- Members: Funding Exchange
- Executive Director: Jane Kimondo
- Website: www.crossroadsfund.org

The Crossroads Fund is a Chicago-based public foundation that supports community organizations working for social and economic justice in the Chicago area. It is a member of a national network of grantmakers called the Funding Exchange [www.fex.org], all of whom share the motto, "change, not charity." This motto speaks to a shared commitment by Funding Exchange members to support grassroots organizations in their efforts towards system change. Crossroads Fund sees direct service as important, but recognizes that it has a critical role to play in supporting groups working to change the world we live in. Crossroads Fund has four standing grantmaking programs, including: the Seed Fund, which targets new, emerging, and risk-taking groups working for social change across issues; the Technical Assistance Fund, which support technical and training needs of eligible grantees; the Emergency Fund offers assistance to groups faced by sudden and unexpected problems; and the donor-advised fund provides a way for donors with a specific interest in an issue to pool their resources for concentrated impact.

The Crossroads Fund is a left-liberal-progressive organization that gives money to many different kinds of projects in Chicago. Advocacy, arts and activism, radical education, and public health are some of the areas. Many of its grantees have been groups working with the poor or with ethnic and sexual minorities. It has been a frequent supporter of immigrant-rights groups in Chicago and also of LGBT groups. For example, in 2007, it co-sponsored the Tubeho Project Exhibit on the Survivors of the Rwandan genocide at Northwestern University. But Crossroads has also supported other kinds of projects, for example ones aiding senior citizens at Jane Addams Hull House. In international affairs, the group has sponsored Chicago Palestine Film Festival and Committee for a Just Peace in Israel & Palestine.

== Bibliography ==
- Davis, Andrew and Amy Wooten, "Taking Charge: What was Happening in 1985", Windy City Times,
- Hemmady, Neena, "Neena Hemmady Remembers",
- Society for Non-Profit Organizations
