= Policing and Society =

- Discipline: Criminology, sociology, policing
- Language: English
- Edited by: Jenny Fleming

Publication details
- History: 2002-present
- Publisher: Taylor & Francis
- Frequency: Quarterly
- Impact factor: 1.610 (2015)

Standard abbreviations
- ISO 4: Polic. Soc.

Indexing
- ISSN: 1043-9463 (print); 1477-2728 (web)
- OCLC no.: 890559689

Links
- Journal homepage; Online archive

Policing and Society is a quarterly peer-reviewed academic journal covering the study of policing. It was established in 2002 and is published by Taylor & Francis. The editor-in-chief is Jenny Fleming (University of Southampton) and the editor for Europe is Sebastian Roché (CNRS, Sciences-Po Grenoble), for the Americas is Jennifer Wood (Temple University), and for Australia is Adrian Cherney (University of Queensland). According to the Journal Citation Reports, the journal has a 2015 impact factor of 1.610, ranking it 15th out of 57 journals in the category "Criminology & Penology".
