= Prison abolition movement in the United States =

Movement to end incarceration

The prison abolition movement is a network of groups and activists that seek to reduce or eliminate prisons and the prison system, and replace them with systems of rehabilitation and education that do not focus on punishment and government institutionalization. The prison abolitionist movement is distinct from conventional prison reform, which is intended to improve conditions inside prisons.

Supporters of prison abolitionism are a diverse group with differing ideas as to exactly how prisons should be abolished, and what, if anything, should replace them. Some supporters of decarceration and prison abolition also work to end solitary confinement, the death penalty, and the construction of new prisons through non-reformist reforms. Others support books-to-prisoner projects and defend prisoners' right to access information and library services. Some organizations, such as the Anarchist Black Cross, seek the total abolishment of the prison system without any intention to replace it with other government-controlled systems.

== Definition ==
Scholar Dorothy Roberts takes the prison abolition movement in the United States to endorse three basic theses:

1. "[T]oday’s carceral punishment system can be traced back to slavery and the racial capitalist regime it relied on and sustained."
2. "[T]he expanding criminal punishment system functions to oppress black people and other politically marginalized groups in order to maintain a racial capitalist regime."
3. "[W]e can imagine and build a more humane and democratic society that no longer relies on caging people to meet human needs and solve social problems."

Thus, Roberts situates the theory of prison abolition within an intellectual tradition including scholars such as Cedric Robinson, who developed the concept of racial capitalism, and characterizes the movement as a response to a long history of oppressive treatment of black people in the United States. In Canada, many abolitionists have called Canada's prisons the "new residential schools", which were designed as a cultural genocide of Indigenous people.

Legal scholar Allegra McLeod notes that prison abolition is not merely a negative project of "opening … prison doors", but rather "may be understood instead as a gradual project of decarceration, in which radically different legal and institutional regulatory forms supplant criminal law enforcement." Prison abolition, in McLeod's view, involves a positive agenda that reimagines how societies might deal with social problems in the absence of prisons, using techniques such as decriminalization and improved welfare provision.

Like Roberts, McLeod sees the contemporary theory of prison abolition as linked to theories regarding the abolition of slavery. McLeod notes that W. E. B. Du Bois—particularly in his Black Reconstruction in America—saw abolitionism not only as a movement to end the legal institution of property in human beings, but also as a means of bringing about a "different future" wherein former slaves could enjoy full participation in society. (Angela Davis explicitly took inspiration from Du Bois's concept of "abolition democracy" in her book Abolition Democracy: Beyond Empire, Prisons, and Torture.) Similarly, on McLeod's view, prison abolition implies broad changes to social institutions: "[a]n abolitionist framework", she writes, "requires positive forms of social integration and collective security that are not organized around criminal law enforcement, confinement, criminal surveillance, punitive policing, or punishment."

The abolition of prisons is not only about the closure of prisons. Abolitionist views is also a way to counter the hegemonic discourse, and gives an alternative ways of thinking. It is a way to reconceptualize basic notions like crime, innocence, punishment etc.

== Historical development ==
=== Anarchism and prison abolition ===
Anti-prison sticker on the door of an infoshop in Pittsburgh, Pennsylvania

Many anarchist organizations believe that the best form of justice arises naturally out of social contracts, restorative justice, or transformative justice.

Anarchist opposition to incarceration can be found in articles written as early as 1851, and is elucidated by major anarchist thinkers such as Proudhon, Bakunin, Berkman, Goldman, Malatesta, Bonanno, and Kropotkin.

Personal experiences in prison because of revolutionary activity prompted many anarchists who were “deeply affected by their experiences” to publish their criticisms. In 1886, the trial of eight anarchists following the Haymarket riots brought state repression to public attention. Lucy Parsons, an anarchist and wife of one of the Haymarket eight, embarked on a speaking tour through 17 different states speaking to a total of almost 200,000 people. Speaking at his trial, in a widely disseminated speech, one of the co-accused, August Spies, stated:

It is not likely that the honorable Bonfield and Grinnell can conceive of a social order not held intact by the policeman's club and pistol, nor of a free society without prisons, gallows, and State's attorneys. In such a society they probably fail to find a place for themselves. And is this the reason why Anarchism is such a "pernicious and damnable doctrine?"

The Anarchist Red Cross, a prisoner support group and the precursor to the Anarchist Black Cross, was founded roughly in 1906. By that year, groups existed in Kiev, Odessa, Bialystok, and trials of its members led to its spread across Europe and North America. A 2018 guide to starting an Anarchist Black Cross group states that "we need to destroy all the prisons, and free all the prisoners. Our position is an abolitionist stance against the state and it’s prisons."

In 1917, the Anarchist Red Cross would disband and members joined the revolution in Russia. Following the February revolution, political prisoners were released from Russian jails, in a massive wave of amnesties. The Anarchist Red Cross reorganised in 1919 as the Anarchist Black Cross, with some members joining the anarchist insurgent Nestor Makhno.

The Anarchist Black Cross was reconstituted in the aftermath of the Spanish Civil War. The pressure from the number of anarchist prisoners in need of aid led to the closing of “most of the chapters in the United States and Europe.” Alternative groups, such as the Alexander Berkman Aid Fund and the Society to Aid Anarchist Prisoners in Russia would take their place. Another resurgence was felt in 1967, and, again, in 1979 owing to the efforts of Lorenzo Kom’boa Ervin, whose writings on prison and anarchism are credited as having spread and been foundational to Black anarchism.

Campaigns to free anarchist prisoners have served as the basis for calling for freedom for all prisoners. June 11, 2011, international solidarity actions for anarchist prisoners Marie Mason and Eric McDavid triggered the start of an international day and week of solidarity with all anarchist prisoners in 2015.

=== The Prisoners Movement ===
Emerging in the 1960s, engaging with traditions of abolitionist thought, The Prisoners' Movement was a nationwide struggle of incarcerated people against both institutions and ontologies of punishment culture in the United States. Growing alongside the anger and the activism of the Civil Rights Movement and soon Black Power, attention was drawn to an identified political economy that privileged racial hierarchies vis-à-vis the constructed identity of ‘whiteness’ through the subjugation of Black and Brown people. Prisoners, especially Black inmates who faced the greatest oppression, increasingly began to politicize their own status as inmates, reviving abolitionist discourse; challenging not only prison establishments, but also called for the dismantling of greater systems of surveillance, policing, and economic subjugation facilitated by racial capitalism. This framework of critique would later emerge to be identified along terminology of the Prison Industrial Complex (PIC).

At first, one of the most prominent ways prisoners challenged the status-quo was through legal pathways and in court. Many of the initial cases in the early 60s related to prison conditions and infringements on rights, especially around religion and freedom of speech of Black Muslim inmates. One of the most prominent cases of the decade, Supreme Court ruling of Cooper v. Pate in 1964, was spearheaded by the Nation of Islam and obtained the legal right to address their grievances before the court. News of this case was soon circulated widely and utilized in hundreds of following court cases, serving to increase prisoners' access to legal counsel, end of brutal conditions, and outside literature. While the Nation of Islam was not overtly abolitionist in the traditional sense, their messaging of Black nationality, rejection of White Christianism, and solidarity was fundamental not only to increasing unity and awareness, but also became deeply threatening to the state. From New York to California, authorities began to complain of the 'disruptive force' the Nation of Islam was causing within correctional facilities, stating that the potential of African American's allegiance could destabilized the "entire penal system." Soon, as the Nation of Islam was viewed as the greatest threat in the early-mid 60s, the emergence and politics of the Black Panther would grow the internal movement only further.

By the end of the 1960s, militant dissent became a more prominent tactic of the movement. One of the most known was the emergence of the infamous 'Soledad Brothers' in 1970 following the accusation against George Jackson, Fleeta Drumgo, and John Cluthcette for the murder of a correctional officer following a political uprising in California’s Soledad Correctional Training Facility. Under the slogan Save the Soledad Brothers from Legal Lynching spearheaded by figures like Angela Davis, their case received magnification due to one of the accused, leftist writer and Black Panther, George Jackson. Celebrated within the prisoners' movement, Jackson had developed his analysis of the state alongside Marxist theory, basing his foundations of theory on the belief that black inequality existed as the linchpin of American capitalism insofar as capitalistic economic carceral slavery had replaced chattel slavery. He further emphasizes the detriment of racial capitalism, a system of slavery, genocide, and violence, solidified through racial hierarchies, central to the founding of the United States, and continuously upheld though morphing naturalized economic and social systems of punishment and control.

The events at Soledad emerging at the end of the 60s would only be followed by a series of other nominal uprisings, such as in Walpole 1973.

==== 1973 Walpole Prison uprising ====
In 1973, two years after the Attica Prison uprising, the inmates of Walpole prison, in Massachusetts, formed a prisoners' union to protect themselves from guards, end behavioral modification programs, advocate for the prisoner's right for education and healthcare, gain more visitation rights, work assignments, and to be able to send money to their families.

The union also created a general truce within the prison and race-related violence sharply declined. During the Kwanzaa celebration, black prisoners were placed under lockdown, angering the whole facility and leading to a general strike. Prisoners refused to work or leave their cells for three months, to which the guards responded by beating prisoners, putting prisoners in solitary confinement, and denying prisoners medical care and food.

The strike ended in the prisoners' favour as the superintendent of the prison resigned. The prisoners were granted more visitation rights and work programs. Angered by this, the prison guards went on strike and abandoned the prison, hoping that this would create chaos and violence throughout the prison. But the prisoners were able to create an anarchist community where recidivism dropped dramatically and murders and rapes fell to zero. Prisoners volunteered to cook meals. Vietnam veterans who had been trained as medics took charge of the pharmacy and distribution of medication. Decisions were made in community assemblies.

==== The Prisoners' Movement and its implications ====
Other intellectuals, such as Liz Samuels, have observed that, following the Attica Prison uprising, activists began to coalesce around a vision of abolition, whereas previously they had endorsed a program of reform. As popularized abolitionist theory began to denaturalize the prison system within the greater consciousness of Americans; the Civil Rights movement began to dissolve tensions between poor working-class black and white people; and the American economy began to fall from the apex of its ‘golden age’ of capitalism and the Keyneisan welfare state, what is now understood as the Prison Industrial Complex (PIC) began to emerge as state crisis response. Many traditional historiographies commonly paint Soledad as the end of the prisoners' rights movement before being crushed by the wave of mass incarceration and Reaganomics. While this account holds certain truths and revolutionary praxis dwindled, the fight continued. Especially in the courtroom, similar to the beginning, gaining greater recognition and support from institutions such as the National Association for the Advancement of Colored People’s Legal Defense Fund and the American Civil Liberties Union. The emerging prisoners' movement, in tandem with the Civil Rights and Black Power movements, thus began to build upon the ever-evolving long tradition of abolitionist dialogue in relation to sociopolitical and economic stations of the time.

=== Prison abolition and the New Left ===
The New Left, emerging hand in hand with the Prisoners' Movement, was heavily influenced by the politics of inmates. People such as Eduardo Bautista Duran and Jonathan Simon point out that George Jackson's 1970 text Soledad Brother drew global attention to the conditions of prisons in the United States and made prison abolition a tenet of the New Left.

Angela Davis traces the roots of contemporary prison abolition theory at least to Thomas Mathiesen's 1974 book The Politics of Abolition, which had been published in the wake of the Attica Prison uprising and unrest in European prisons around the same time. She also cites activist Fay Honey Knopp's 1976 work Instead of Prisons: A Handbook for Abolitionists as significant in the movement.

== Advocates of prison abolition ==
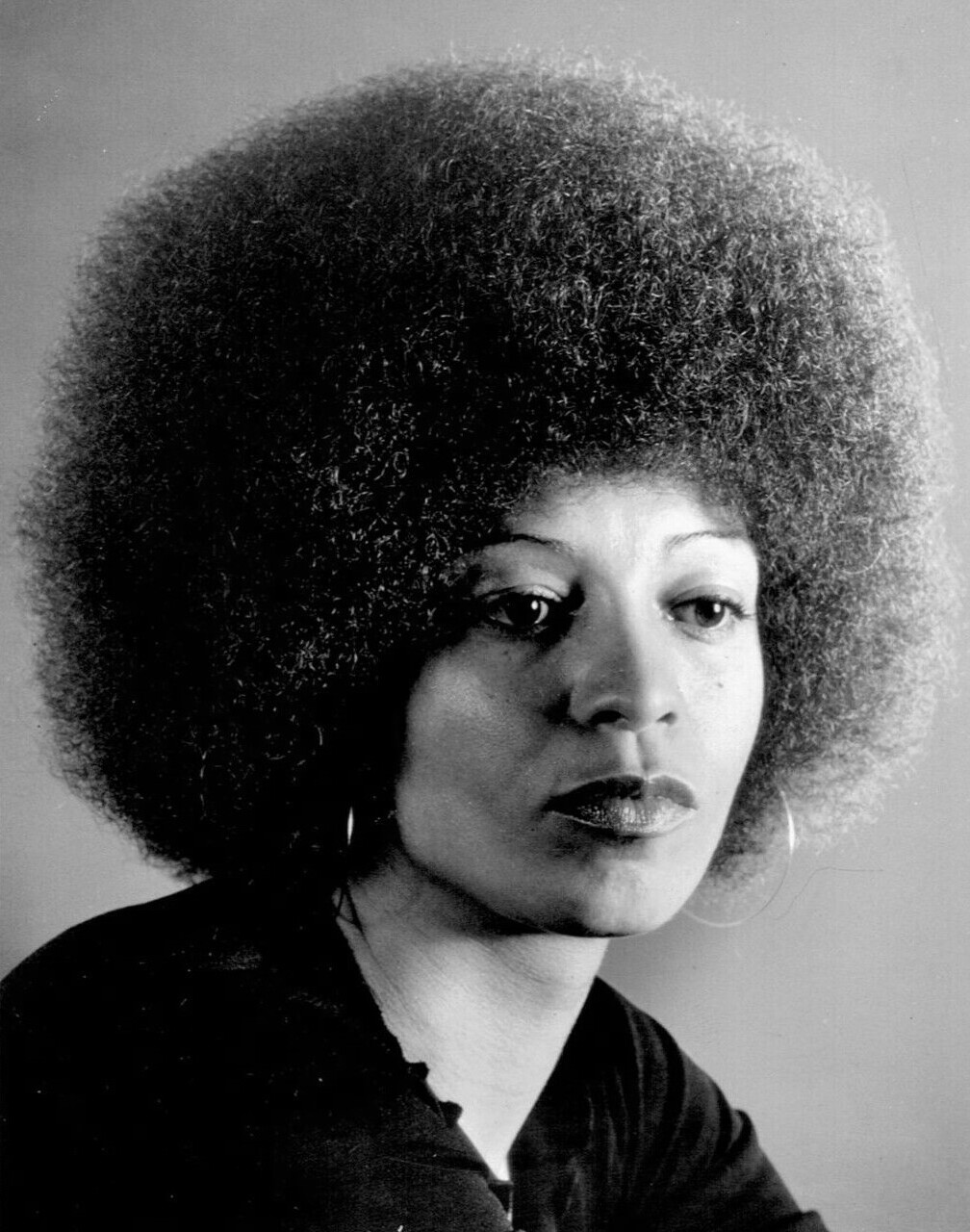
Angela Davis is an American advocate of prison abolition.

Angela Davis writes: "Mass incarceration is not a solution to unemployment, nor is it a solution to the vast array of social problems that are hidden away in a rapidly growing network of prisons and jails. However, the great majority of people have been tricked into believing in the efficacy of imprisonment, even though the historical record clearly demonstrates that prisons do not work."

In 1997, Angela Davis and Ruth Wilson Gilmore co-founded Critical Resistance, which is an organization working to "build an international movement to end the Prison Industrial Complex by challenging the belief that caging and controlling people makes us safe." Other similarly motivated groups such as the Prison Activist Resource Center (PARC), a group "committed to exposing and challenging all forms of institutionalized racism, sexism, able-ism, heterosexism, and classism, specifically within the Prison Industrial Complex," and Black & Pink, an abolitionist organization that focuses around LGBTQ rights, all broadly advocate for prison abolition. Furthermore, the Human Rights Coalition, a 2001 group based in the city of Philadelphia that aims to abolish prisons, with their mission stating "to empower prisoners' families to be leaders in prison organizing and to teach them how to advocate on behalf of their loved ones in prison and expose the inhumane practices of the Department of Corrections." In addition, the California Coalition for Women Prisoners, a grassroots organization dedicated to dismantling the PIC, can all be added to the long list of organizations that desire a different form of justice system.

Activist adrienne maree brown wrote in support of the prison abolition movement in her book We Will Not Cancel Us. Published in 2020, the book is an expansion of a blog post of the same title that Brown posted on her website in 2018. Her book expands the blog posts theme of transformative justice and the connection between cancel culture and the prison system. She wrote an article for YES! magazine about the dream of a world without prisons and policing. Brown was celebrated by the Women's Prison Association among other Black female advocates for prison abolition, including Angela Davis and Ruth Wilson Gilmore.

Project NIA, an organization founded in 2009 by Mariame Kaba, helps to end the incarceration of youth, as well as victims of violence "through community-based alternatives to the criminal legal process."

In October 2015, members at a plenary session of the National Lawyers Guild (NLG) released and adopted a resolution in favor of prison abolition.

Many large socialist organizations in the United States support police and prison abolition, including Democratic Socialists of America and the Party for Socialism and Liberation.

== Disability, mental illness and prison ==
Prison abolitionists such as Amanda Pustilnik take issue with the fact that prisons are used as a "default asylum" for many individuals with mental illness:

Why do governmental units choose to spend billions of dollars a year to concentrate people with serious illnesses in a system designed to punish intentional lawbreaking, when doing so matches neither the putative purposes of that system nor most effectively addresses the issues posed by that population?

In the United States, there are more people with mental illness in prisons than in psychiatric hospitals. In Canada, mental health issues are 2 to 3 times more prevalent in prisons than in the general population.

Prison abolitionists contend that prisons violate the Constitutional rights (5th and 6th Amendment rights) of mentally ill prisoners on the grounds that these individuals will not be receiving the same potential for rehabilitation as the non-mentally ill prison population. This injustice is sufficient grounds to argue for the abolishment of prisons. Prisons were not designed to be used to house the mentally ill, and prison practices like solitary confinement are damaging to mental health. Additionally, individuals with mental illnesses have a much higher chance of dying by suicide while in prison.

In response to the fear that prisons are needed for the most serious cases of mentally ill, Liat Ben-Mosh describe prison abolitionist's' view on the issue: "Many prison abolitionists advocate for transformative justice and healing practices in which no one will be restrained or segregated, while some, like PREAP, believe that there will always be a small percentage of those whose behavior is so unacceptable or harmful that they will need to be incapacitated, socially exiled, or restrained and that this should be done humanely, temporarily, and not in a carceral or punitive manner." Another point raised is that the current focus in criminal justice reform on nonviolent, nonserious and nonsexual offences shrinks the borders and understandings of innocence and guilt.

== Aging in prison ==
The prison abolition movement and prison abolitionists like Liat Ben-Moshe have taken issue with the treatment of the aging population in prisons. Prolonged sentencing policies have resulted in an increased aging population in prisons as well as the harsh conditions of imprisonment. A number of reasons can contribute to older adult's risk for illness while in prison. Prisons are not intended to be used as nursing homes, hospice or long-term care facilities for the aging prison population. Despite this, prison hospice does exist.

== Proposed reforms and alternatives ==
Proposals for prison reform and alternatives to prisons differ significantly depending on the political beliefs behind them. Often they fall in one of three categories from the "Attrition Model", a model proposed by the Prison Research Education Action Project in 1976: moratorium, decarceration, and excarceration. Proposals and tactics often include:

- Penal system reforms:
  - Substituting, for incarceration, supervised release, probation, restitution to victims, and/or community work.
  - Decreasing terms of imprisonment by abolishing mandatory minimum sentencing
  - Decreasing ethnic disparity in prison populations
- Prison condition reforms
- Crime prevention rather than punishment
- Abolition of specific programs which increase prison population, such as the prohibition of drugs (e.g., the American war on drugs) and prohibition of prostitution.
- Education programs to inform people who have never been in prison about its problems
- Fighting individual cases of wrongful conviction

The United Nations Office on Drugs and Crime published a series of handbooks on criminal justice. Among them is Alternatives to Imprisonment which identifies how the overuse of imprisonment impacts fundamental human rights, especially those convicted for lesser crimes.

Social justice and advocacy organizations such as Students Against Mass Incarceration (SAMI) at the University of California, San Diego often look to Scandinavian countries Sweden and Norway for guidance in regard to successful prison reform because both countries have an emphasis on rehabilitation rather than punishment. According to Sweden's former Prison and Probation Service Director-General, Nils Öberg, this emphasis is popular among the Swedish because the act of imprisonment is considered punishment enough. This focus on rehabilitation includes an emphasis on promoting normalcy for inmates, a charge led by experienced criminologists and psychologists. In Norway a focus on preparation for societal re-entry has yielded "one of the lowest recidivism rates in the world at 20%, [while] the US has one of the highest: 76.6% of [American] prisoners are re-arrested within five years". The Swedish incarceration rate decreased by 6% between 2011 and 2012.

=== Abolitionist views ===
Many prison reform organizations and abolitionists in the United States advocate community accountability practices, such as community-controlled courts, councils, or assemblies as an alternative to the criminal justice system.

Abolitionists like Angela Davis recommend four measures as a way to deal with violent and other serious crimes: (1) make mental health care available to all (2) everyone should have access to affordable treatment for substance use disorders (3) make a stronger effort to rehabilitate those who commit criminal offenses and (4) employ reparative or restorative justice measures as an accountability tool to reconcile offenders with their victims and undo or compensate the harm done.

Organizations such as INCITE! and Sista II Sista that support women of color who are survivors of interpersonal violence argue that the criminal justice system does not protect marginalized people who are victims in relationships. Instead, victims, especially those who are poor, minorities, transgender or gender non-conforming can experience additional violence at the hands of the state. Instead of relying on the criminal justice system, these organizations work to implement community accountability practices, which often involve collectively-run processes of intervention initiated by a survivor of violence to try to hold the person who committed violence accountable by working to meet a set of demands. For organizations outside the United States see, e.g. Justice Action, Australia.

Some anarchists and socialists contend that a large part of the problem is the way the judicial system deals with prisoners, people, and capital. According to Marxists, in capitalist economies incentives are in place to expand the prison system and increase the prison population. This is evidenced by the creation of private prisons in America and corporations like CoreCivic, formerly known as Correction Corporation of America (CCA). Its shareholders benefit from the expansion of prisons and tougher laws on crime. More prisoners is seen as beneficial for business. Some anarchists contend that with the destruction of capitalism, and the development of social structures that would allow for the self-management of communities, property crimes would largely vanish. There would be fewer prisoners, they assert, if society treated people more fairly, regardless of gender, color, ethnic background, sexual orientation, education, etc.

The demand for prison abolition is a feature of anarchist criminology, which argues that prisons encourage recidivism and should be replaced by efforts to rehabilitate offenders and reintegrate them into communities.

==== Queer Abolitionist Thought ====
Issues related to prison abolition have attracted the attention of several prominent queer studies scholars who wish to draw attention to the intersection of queerness and the carceral system. As a social justice issue, queer scholars are concerned about the inhumane conditions of the U.S. carceral system and the ways it specifically punishes LGBTQ+ populations. Sarah Lamble, a professor at Birkbeck, University of London, notes how queer, transgender, and gender non-conforming people of color are "over-policed, over-criminalized, and over-represented in the prison system". For example, transgender women and two spirit people are much more likely to be placed in solitary confinement. Queer abolitionist scholars analyze how “... gender, sex, and sexuality have been deployed within larger political, economic, and social processes driving mass incarceration in the United States”. Some scholars have also identified the U.S. carceral system as functioning as an “anti-queer regime” in its punishments of LGBTQ+ populations.

Eric A. Stanley, a professor of Gender and Women’s Studies at UC Berkeley, and Dean Spade, a law professor and transgender activist, argue that queerness and the prison abolition movement have been intertwined since before the term “abolition” gained popularity in academic and activist spaces. In Queering Prison Abolition, Now?, Stanley and Spade talk about how early queer and transgender activism against state violence built the foundation of modern abolitionist frameworks. They cite the works of activists Marsha P. Johnson and Sylvia Rivera. Scholar Regina Kunzel writes how the gay and lesbian activism of the 1970s brought to attention the enforcement of heteronormativity and a gender binary.

LGBTQ+ youth and young adults (primarily of color) experience high rates of arrest and incarceration to the extent that “...some data [indicates] that up to 85% of incarcerated LGBTQ+ youth are people of color”. Queer and trans youth of color face higher rates of homelessness, unemployment, school bullying, street harassment, alienation from family, and sexual violence; all of which lead to an increase chance of being incarcerated. Scholars, Jane Hereth and Anna Bouris, identify school discipline issues and the child welfare system as “...pathways to funnel LGBTQ+ youth into the criminal legal system”. The "school-to-prison-pipeline" disproportionately affects queer trans and youth. Hereth & Bouris call within the social work discipline to implement abolitionist praxis to prevent the incarceration of LGBTQ+ youth.

Queer studies scholars have also critiqued the ideas of gender-responsive prisons. Joshua Janak views gender responsive prisons as an “excuse to expand carceral power by building new prisons”. These scholars note that reforms, like gender-responsive prisons, reproduce the same carceral logic that abolitionists seek to dismantle.

Scholars like Janak write on how art forms like literature, film, and music can be used as tools to further build on abolitionist worlds and Black trans futures. In Janak’s essay, (Trans)gendering Abolition, Black trans people are simultaneously hypervisible and hyperinvisible. Black trans people are under constant surveillance and scrutiny by the criminal justice system while simultaneously having their identities and experiences erased in the general media. Janak names Free CeCe! (a documentary following the lived experiences of CeCe McDonald), Redefining Realness: My Path to Womanhood, Identity, Love, and So Much More (a memoir on Janet Mock’s life), and Jay-Marie Hill’s Past Time (In Conversation with Lamia Beard) as artworks that construct black trans geographies based in an abolitionist framework.

==== “Nine perspectives for prison abolitionists” ====
Instead of prisons: a handbook for abolitionists, republished by Critical Resistance in 2005, outlines what the organization identifies as the nine main perspectives for prison abolitionists:

- Perspective 1 The imprisonment of a human being is inherently immoral, and while total abolition of the current prison system is not an easy task, it is possible. The first step towards abolition is admitting that prisons cannot be reformed, as a carceral system is founded on brutality and contempt for those imprisoned. Additionally, the current system works to disproportionally imprison poor and working-class people, so its abolition would ensure progress towards equality. Abolitionists see many similarities between today's carceral system and the slavery establishment of the past, and would in fact say that the current system is simply reformed enslavement which perpetuates the same oppressive and discriminatory patterns. But just as superficial reforms could not alter the brutality of the slave system, reforms cannot change a system rooted in racism.
- Perspective 2 The abolitionist message requires changing our language and definitions of punishment “treatment” and “inmates”. In order to break away from the prison system, we must use honest language and take back the power of our vocabulary.
- Perspective 3 Imprisonment is not a proper response to deviance. Abolitionists promote reconciliation rather than punishment, a perspective seeking to restore both the criminal and the victim while limiting the disruption of their lives in the process.
- Perspective 4 Abolitionists advocate for changes beneficial to the prisoner but do so while remaining a non-member of the system. In a similar fashion, abolitionists respect the personhood of system managers but oppose their role in the perpetuation of an oppressive system.
- Perspective 5 The abolitionist message extends farther than the traditional helping relationship; Abolitionists identify themselves as allies of the imprisoned, respecting their perspectives as well as the requirements for abolition.
- Perspective 6 The empowerment of prisoners and ex-prisoners is crucial to the abolitionist movement. Programs and resources dedicated to reinstating that which has been stripped from them by the prison system are fundamental in putting power back in their own hands.
- Perspective 7 Abolitionists believe that citizens are the true source of institutional power which can lead to the abolition of the prison system. Giving or limiting support from certain policies and practices will enable the progression of the abolitionist movement.
- Perspective 8 Abolitionists believe that crime is a consequence of a broken society, and resources must be used towards social programs instead of the funding of prisons. They advocate for public solutions to public problems, producing effects which will benefit everyone in society.
- Perspective 9 An emphasis is placed on the correction of society rather than the correction of an individual. It is only in a corrected or caring community that individual redemption and rehabilitation can be achieved. Thus, abolitionists see that the only adequate alternative to the prison system is building a kind of society which has no need for prisons.

== List of Prison abolition organizations in the United States ==
- Abolitionist Law Center
- Black & Pink
- California Coalition for Women Prisoners
- Critical Resistance
- Freedom for Immigrants
- Prison Activist Resource Center (PARC)
- Project NIA

== See also ==
- Prison abolition
- Abolition feminism
- Criminal justice reform
- Police abolition
- Exile
- LGBTQ people in prison
- Louk Hulsman
- Nils Christie
- Penal labor
- Convict leasing, abolished by Presidential order in 1942
- Prison-industrial complex
- Pacifism
- School-to-prison pipeline
