= Abolition feminism =

Branch of feminism

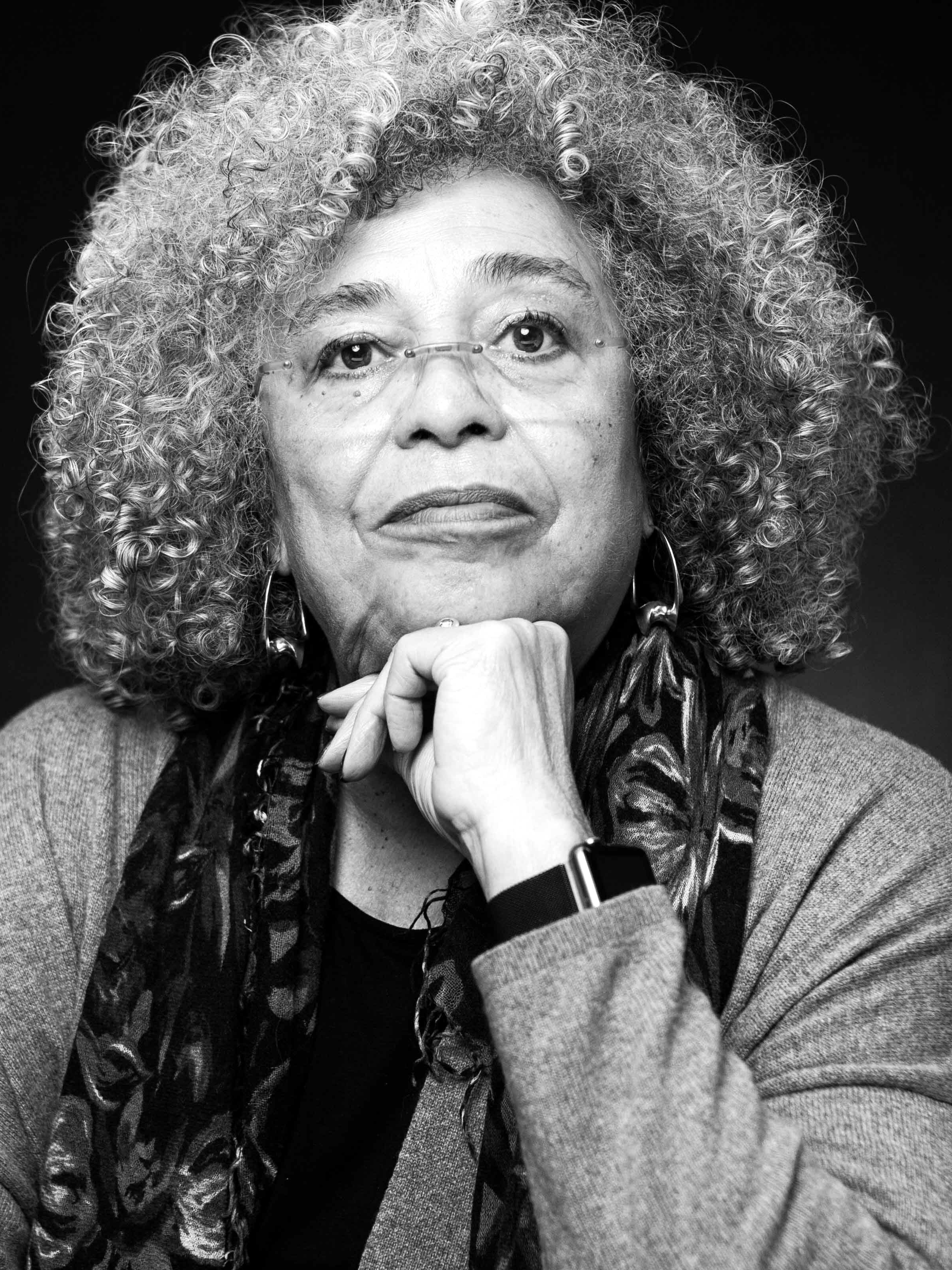
Writer and activist Angela Davis who helped coin the term abolition feminism.

Abolition feminism is a branch of feminism that calls for the elimination of the prison–industrial complex. The term was coined by the feminist writers Angela Davis, Gina Dent, Erica R. Meiners, and Beth Richie in their book Abolition. Feminism. Now. Abolitionist feminist thinkers promote the idea of prison abolition, and embrace an anti-racist, anti-capitalist, and pacifist approach to feminism. Abolition feminism stands in opposition to carceral feminism. Abolitionist feminists reject carceral solutions to gender-based violence in favor of transformative and restorative justice.

== Terminology ==
Abolition feminism is defined as a "dialectic, a relationality, and a form of interruption: an insistence that abolitionist theories and practices are most compelling when they are also feminist, and conversely, a feminism that is also abolitionist is the most inclusive and persuasive version of feminism for these times.” In order to achieve the goals of prison and police abolition, abolitionist feminists argue in favor of eliminating intersecting structures of oppression, like racism, gender violence, sexual violence, and the heteropatriarchy. This vision for an alternative is often referred to as "abolition democracy" which envisions alternatives to militarization and imprisonment through the use of restorative practices.

Abolitionist feminists view crime as a fluid concept that is socially constructed as opposed to a natural phenomenon. Abolitionist feminists argue feminism and abolition are required to inform one another in order to allow for a greater critique of the carceral system. For abolition feminists, violence is not understood as an individual issue with individual solutions, instead violence must be met with structural reforms beyond imprisonment. The feminist lens allows for issues of gender-based violence to become relevant among abolitionists.

== Theorists ==
- Angela Y. Davis
- Gina Dent
- Erica R. Meiners
- Beth E. Richie
- Mia Mingus
- Mariame Kaba
- Shira Hassan

== Organizations ==
- INCITE! Women, Gender Non-Conforming, and Trans people of Color Against Violence
- Critical Resistance
- Just Practice
- Interrupting Criminalization
