= Carceral feminism =

Forms of feminism that advocate for increased prison sentences

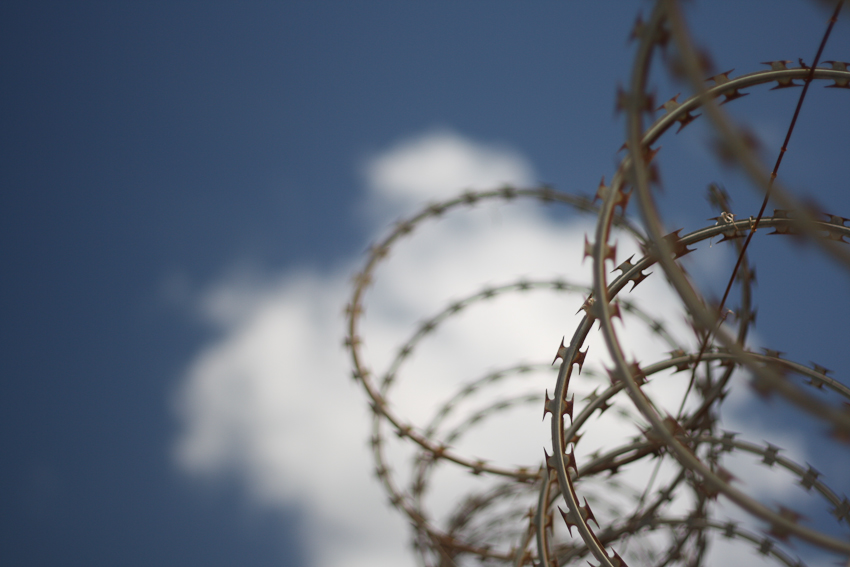
A jail's razor wire

Carceral feminism is a critical term for types of feminism that advocate for enhancing and increasing prison sentences that deal with feminist and gender issues. The term criticises the belief that harsher and longer prison sentences will help work towards solving these issues. The phrase "carceral feminism" was coined by Elizabeth Bernstein, a feminist sociologist, in her 2007 article, "The Sexual Politics of the 'New Abolitionism'". Examining the contemporary anti-trafficking movement in the United States, Bernstein introduced the term to describe a type of feminist activism which casts all forms of sexual labor as sex trafficking. She sees this as a retrograde step, suggesting it erodes the rights of women in the sex industry, and takes the focus off other important feminist issues, and expands the neoliberal agenda.

== Background ==
Bernstein argued that feminist support for anti-trafficking laws that equate prostitution with sex-trafficking have undercut the efforts of sex workers themselves in previous decades to organize for their rights, instead bolstering their criminalization. Evangelical Christians share this commitment to law-and-order in Bernstein's account, and later, Bernstein attributed their alliance to the broader political and economic shift in the US from a redistributive welfare state towards a "carceral" one that fosters criminalization and incarceration. She argued that for both feminists and evangelical Christians, politics of gender and sexuality have shifted attention from the family (i.e. issues of battering and abortion, respectively) outward to the public sphere (i.e. sex-trafficking) and in this shift, have intertwined the anti-trafficking movement with neoliberal politics. In her article, "Carceral Politics as Gender Justice?", Bernstein expanded on this analysis, using the case of the anti-trafficking movement to demonstrate how feminism has more generally become a vehicle of punitive politics in the US and abroad.

== Examples ==
=== Rape ===
Rape laws have gradually been liberalized across the Anglo-American world. Criminal law in these jurisdictions now recognizes that rape can be committed against any gender in a variety of circumstances that do not necessarily require penile penetration. Immunity for men who rape their wives within the context of marriage has been abolished. The evidence required for a rape conviction has also been relaxed as most laws now recognize rape where there is a lack of affirmative consent rather than the more strict requirement that there be an exertion of force by the defendant and active resistance by the victim.

=== Domestic violence ===
Domestic violence legislation has seen significant developments in the United States. Where the state had previously been reluctant to interfere in the private realm, it now views the home as a potential site for crime. The criminal protection order was an important precursor to the criminalization of domestic violence. Where such an order was issued against an individual, their presence at the home became a proxy for domestic violence. Anti-violence campaigns in the US in the 1970s and 1980s also led to policies that required police to make an arrest when responding to domestic violence calls, which resulted in increased arrests of both men and women.

=== Carceral Feminism in Sweden ===
Before gendered violence was recognized by the government of Sweden, it was under the name of 'domestic violence'. During the 1990s, though, the women's shelter movement brought attention to specific behavior that highlighted violence in men, and a new name was given to gendered violence, 'men's violence against women'. When the 2000s came by, the view of feminist ideologies that backed 'men's violence against women' was questioned, ultimately taking the credibility out of that term, and reverting it back to what it was before the women's shelter movement.

== Other domains ==
Feminist scholars have described the trajectory of feminist activism in other spheres similarly. In their studies of the feminist campaigns around the issues of domestic violence and sexual assault, for example, sociologist Beth Richie and political theorist Kristin Bumiller traced the development of the feminist anti-violence movement in the US from its original focus on social transformation to its nearly ubiquitous reliance on law and law-enforcement today. A similar trend has been described outside of the US context—for example, Miriam Ticktin argued that anti-immigrant sentiments in feminist campaigns against sexual violence in France have served border control and other forms of policing. Some examples of this are with Alex Press in the mentions of his Vox article about the #MeToo link that brought forth a movement about the incarceration of domestic violence victims. He argues that they should go against this type of feminism due to the reasoning of more women that are possibly in harm. Virginia Law discusses the critique of her view for carceral feminism that the term could also bring more harm for women such as it did with the Violence Against Women Act (VAWA). Anna Terwiel raises the awareness of needing additional change for carceral feminism such as, by bringing in more programs that require them to find ways on changing the perpetrator's behavior. Assuming that there should be consequences for the actions committed in these certain situations. Feminists are pushing for change that will impact the domestic violence community and not just from the individualistic standpoint.

== Activist critiques and media discussion ==
Activists have also challenged this mode of feminism. Feminists involved in the prison abolition movement, especially, have been critical of feminist alliances with prisons and policing. The national activist organization Incite! Women of Color Against Violence, for example, formed in 2000 with the conviction that the criminal justice system does not support but rather causes further harm for women, gender non-conforming, and trans people of color experiencing interpersonal violence. Since its introduction in 2007, the term "carceral feminism" has been used widely by activists to make such critiques and has made its way into discussions and debates in media forums such as Twitter and Vox. Activist and community organizer Marlihan Lopez argues that the goals of eliminating violence, and specifically gender-based violence, cannot be met within punitive and carceral systems. As opposed to carceral feminism that calls for putting perpetrators of gender-based violence in prison and imposing harsher sentences, activists such as Lopez work at the community level to equip communities with tools to intervene in patterns of harm while also developing mechanisms of accountability. Anti-carceral feminist activists call for the reallocation of funds and resources from the police and carceral systems to education, social housing, and other life-affirming social services.

There are activists working towards sex worker justice who echo abolitionist and anti-carceral feminist calls to abolish police and prisons. Sex workers are often victims of gender-based violence and sexual assault by police officers, heightened by the criminalization and lack of security services surrounding their work. A critique of racialized anti-carceral feminists has been the cooptation of abolitionist language by white carceral feminists who call for the abolition of sex work, which they see as akin to sexual slavery of women.

Angela Davis, in the chapter "How Gender Structures the Prison System" of her book Are Prisons Obsolete?, argues that carceral feminism intersects with the oppressive use of psychiatry to pathologize women who fight back against abuse and violence. She contends that while male offenders were seen as individuals who have violated the social contract and thus were granted redemption through prison time, female offenders were seen as fundamentally transgressing morality. In their role as women, they had failed and thus could not benefit from salvation. In the United States, Quaker reformers argued that women could be reformed, but did so in a way that maintained gendered norms of womanhood, which meant implementing a regime designed to turn criminalized women into models of domesticity. Davis further submits that this is why female prisoners serve on average longer sentences than men and are overmedicated, in order to keep them under the control and surveillance of the state, since the theory of eugenics stipulates that women who are genetically unfit due to insanity must be kept in jail for as long as possible so that they would bear fewer children. Davis also highlights how sexual violence against women in society is perpetuated and hidden behind prison walls. This abuse, along with racism and misogyny, is intensified in the prison system and sanctioned in an environment of punishment.

In Canada, Indigenous women are both overrepresented in the prison system and victims to a history of forced sterilisation in the name of eugenics. In 2022, Indigenous women accounted for half of the female population in federal penitentiaries. Starting in the late 1920s, Canada sanctioned forced sterilization through laws such as Alberta's Sexual Sterilization Act. Although no longer prohibited by law, there continue to be numerous reports of non-consensual sterilization on Indigenous women in Canada.

Mimi Kim, a researcher at California State University on feminist anti-carceral policies, uses the metaphor "dancing with the devil", in order to illustrate the ineffective cooperation between carceral feminists and the State in their attempt to decrease gender-based crimes through more criminalization and policing. Criticizing the mainstream feminist anti-violence movement as heavily reliant on the adversarial model of the female victim versus the male assailant when it comes to sexual violence, she proposes alternatives to the patriarchal criminal justice system, such as transformative justice practices and abolitionist initiatives, to comprehensively address all forms of harm. Kim fundamentally argues that the advance of carceral feminism has been framed by contradictions and paradoxes of reform politics. Carceral feminist strategies' reliance on law enforcement to address gendered violence and harms have resulted in mandates that have contributed to mass incarceration. Kim highlights how anti-carceral feminism finds its roots communities of colour, who have suffered the most at the hands of state-sanctioned violence and punishment. Anti-carceral feminists have developed values and practices grounded in transformative justice, community-based responses to violence and community accountability. They, along with abolitionists, view the carceral state as the primary site for the perpetuation of violence and oppression that largely targets populations depending on racial, class, gender and other identity markers.

== Sexual and domestic violence ==
Logo of the ACLU, an organization that discussed the topic of carceral feminism

According to the American Civil Liberties Union (ACLU), "79% of women in federal and state prisons reported physical abuse and over 60% reported past sexual abuse", and furthermore, "As many as 90% of the women in prison today for killing men had previously been battered by those men". This means that many of the women who are in prison are victims of sexual violence who may have committed the crimes that they were indicted for as a result of the sexual violence they experienced. The anti-carceral feminist movement pushes towards solving this issue and fighting the criminalization and incarceration of women who are victims of sexual and domestic violence.

An initiative created to help illuminate and help these injustices is the Survived and Punished Organization, which began in 2015. This organization acknowledges that many of these women, such as BIPOC women, transgender women, and non-gender conforming people have experienced sexual and/or domestic violence. In a lot of cases, this history of sexual violence could give reason to their crime. The organization also explains how, once in prison, many of these people are subjected to more sexual violence or harassment by the guards or other individuals. The organization seeks to help women who end up incarcerated in domestic or sexual violence cases prove the crime they committed was potentially an act of self-defense. There are also circumstances where women are coerced into being an accomplice. Overall, this organization seeks to rectify a system which they believe wrongfully targets minority groups, people of color, and women. ACLU explains: "The average prison sentence of men who kill their female partners is 2 to 6 years. Women who kill their partners are sentenced on average to 15 years, even though most women who kill their partners do so to protect themselves from violence initiated by their partners."

This means that women are being more harshly prosecuted for the same crime when, in a lot of cases, that crime was a response to their partners' violence. Based on this statistic, it can be seen that there is some inequity in sentence-length between genders. This alludes to the possibility that carceral feminism may result in the increased suffering and persecution of minority groups. Another example of how carceral feminism may affect minority groups can be seen through examining the case of The Central Park Five. In 1989, five African American and Latin American teenagers were arrested and convicted for the brutal rape of Trisha Meili in New York's Central Park. All of them received prison sentences ranging from 6 to 13 years. However, with the progression of technology and the addition of DNA evidence, it was revealed that the sole perpetrator of the rape was Matias Reyes, meaning that the other five men were innocent. This is a case where because of the harsh criminal sentences and punishments associated with rape cases, this can lead to potentially innocent people being wrongfully prosecuted. Additionally, in this case, minority groups can be, as a result, more negatively affected by the harsher punishments that carceral feminism aims to support. Many feminists who are prison abolitionists also argue that these events reflect a historical trend of weaponizing the protection of white cisgender women against men of color and queer people by emphasizing on stereotypes that portray them as threatening or dangerous.

== See also ==
- Penal populism
