= Violence Against Women Act =

United States crime legislation

- Long title: An Act to Control and Prevent Crime
- Acronyms (colloquial): VAWA
- Enacted by: the 103rd United States Congress

Citations
- Public law: Pub. L. 103–322
- Statutes at Large: 108 Stat. 1796

Codification
- Titles amended: 42 U.S.C.
- U.S.C. sections created: 42 U.S.C. ch. 136 (originally expired on February 15, 2019, reauthorized on March 15, 2022)

Legislative history
- Introduced in the House as H.R. 3355 by Jack Brooks (D–TX) on October 26, 1993; Committee consideration by House Judiciary; Passed the House on November 3, 1993 (voice vote); Passed the Senate on November 19, 1993 (95–4, in lieu of S. 1607); Reported by the joint conference committee on August 10 and 21, 1994; agreed to by the House on August 21, 1994 (235–195) and by the Senate on August 25, 1994 (61–38); Signed into law by President Bill Clinton on September 13, 1994

Major amendments
- VAWA was reauthorized on March 15, 2022, by President Joe Biden

United States Supreme Court cases
- United States v. Morrison, 529 U.S. 598 (2000); Paroline v. United States, 572 U.S. 434 (2014); United States v. Rahimi, 602 U.S. ___ (2024)

The Violence Against Women Act of 1994 (VAWA) is a United States federal law (Title IV of the Violent Crime Control and Law Enforcement Act, H.R. 3355) signed by President Bill Clinton on September 13, 1994. The act provided $1.6 billion toward investigation and the prosecution of violent crimes against women, imposed automatic and mandatory restitution on those convicted, and allowed civil redress when prosecutors chose not to prosecute cases. The act also established the Office on Violence Against Women within the U.S. Department of Justice.

The bill was originally written in 1990 by Patricia Schroeder (D-CO), Louise Slaughter, (D-NY) & Barbara Boxer (D-CA) along with women from the Women's Policy Inc.

Rep. Schroeder introduced the House version, H.R. 1133 (the Violence Against Women Act of 1993). It passed the House of Representatives.

In 1994, Louise Slaughter convinced Representative Jack Brooks (D-TX) to introduce the bill and it gained support from a broad coalition of advocacy groups. The act passed through both houses of the U.S. Congress with bipartisan support in 1994; however, House Republicans attempted to cut the act's funding the following year. In the 2000 U.S. Supreme Court case United States v. Morrison, a sharply divided court struck down the VAWA provision allowing women the right to sue the accused in federal court. By a 5–4 majority, the Court overturned the provision as exceeding the federal government's powers under the Commerce Clause.

VAWA was reauthorized by bipartisan majorities in Congress in 2000 and again in December 2005. The act's 2012 renewal was opposed by conservative Republicans, who objected to extending the act's protections to same-sex couples and to provisions allowing battered undocumented immigrants to claim temporary visas, but it was reauthorized in 2013 after a long legislative battle. As a result of the United States federal government shutdown of 2018–2019, the act expired on December 21, 2018. It was temporarily reinstated via a short-term spending bill on January 25, 2019, but expired again on February 15, 2019. The U.S. House of Representatives passed a bill reauthorizing VAWA in April 2019 that included new provisions protecting transgender victims and banning individuals convicted of domestic abuse from purchasing firearms. In an attempt to reach a bipartisan agreement, senators Joni Ernst (R-IA) and Dianne Feinstein (D-CA) led months of negotiation talks that came to a halt in November 2019. VAWA was reauthorized on March 15, 2022, by President Joe Biden.

In 2024, the Supreme Court ruled 8–1 in United States v. Rahimi to uphold the law's provision banning people (not convicted of any crimes) from possessing firearms while a domestic violence restraining order was currently active against them.

== Background ==
The United Nations' 1993 World Conference on Human Rights, held in Vienna, Austria, and the Declaration on the Elimination of Violence Against Women, ratified by the UN the same year, concluded that civil society and governments have acknowledged that domestic violence is a concern of both public health policy and human rights. In the United States, according to the 2010 National Intimate Partner Sexual Violence Survey, 1 in 6 women have suffered some kind of sexual violence by their intimate partner during the course of their lives.

As late as 1970–1990, domestic violence had been regarded as a private matter and ignored by the police. According to Joan Zorza, "throughout the 1970s and early 1980s, officers believed and were taught that domestic violence was a private matter, ill suited to public intervention." Even when arrests were made, the abusers were not deterred. The results of three studies conducted in Omaha, Charlotte, and Milwaukee indicate the futility of arrest as a sole deterrent.

The Violence Against Women Act was developed and passed as a result of extensive grassroots efforts in the late 1980s and early 1990s. Advocates for the battered women's movement included sexual assault advocates, individuals from victim services, law enforcement agencies, prosecutors' offices, the courts, and the private bar. They urged Congress to adopt significant legislation to address domestic and sexual violence.

The Violence Against Women Act established new offenses and penalties for the violation of a protection order or incidents of stalking in which an abuser crossed a state line to injure or harass another, or forced a victim to cross a state line under duress and then physically harmed the victim in the course of a violent crime.

One of the greatest successes of VAWA is its emphasis on a coordinated community response to domestic violence, sex dating violence, sexual assault, and stalking; courts, law enforcement, prosecutors, victim services, and the private bar currently work together in a coordinated effort that did not exist before at the state and local levels. VAWA also supports the work of community-based organizations which are engaged in work to end domestic violence, dating violence, sexual assault, and stalking, particularly those groups that provide culturally and linguistically specific services. Additionally, VAWA provides specific support for work with tribes and tribal organizations to end domestic violence, dating violence, sexual assault, and stalking against Native American women. In December 2022, the Violence Against Women Act was amended to include Native Hawaiian survivors of gender-based violence and Native Hawaiian organizations in grant funding.

Many grant programs authorized in VAWA have been funded by the U.S. Congress. The following grant programs, which are administered primarily through the Office on Violence Against Women in the U.S. Department of Justice, have received appropriations from Congress:

- STOP Grants (State Formula Grants)
- Transitional Housing Grants
- Grants to Encourage Arrest and Enforce Protection Orders
- Court Training and Improvement Grants
- Research on Violence Against Native American Women
- National Tribal Sex Offender Registry
- Stalker Reduction Database
- Federal Victim Assistants
- Sexual Assault Services Program
- Services for Rural Victims
- Civil Legal Assistance for Victims
- Elder Abuse Grant Program
- Protections and Services for Disabled Victims
- Combating Abuse in Public Housing
- National Resource Center on Workplace Responses
- Violence on College Campuses Grants
- Safe Havens Project
- Engaging Men and Youth in Prevention

== Debate and legal standing ==
The American Civil Liberties Union (ACLU) had originally expressed concerns about the act, saying that the increased penalties were rash, that the increased pretrial detention was "repugnant" to the U.S. Constitution, that the mandatory HIV testing of those only charged but not convicted was an infringement of a citizen's right to privacy, and that the edict for automatic payment of full restitution was non-judicious (see their paper: "Analysis of Major Civil Liberties Abuses in the Crime Bill Conference Report as Passed by the House and the Senate", dated September 29, 1994). In 2005, the ACLU had, however, enthusiastically supported reauthorization of VAWA on the condition that the "unconstitutional DNA provision" be removed. That provision would have allowed law enforcement to take DNA samples from arrestees or from those who had simply been stopped by police without the permission of a court.

The ACLU, in its July 27, 2005 'Letter to the Senate Judiciary Committee Regarding the Violence Against Women Act of 2005, S. 1197' stated that "VAWA is one of the most effective pieces of legislation enacted to end domestic violence, dating violence, sexual assault, and stalking. It has dramatically improved the law enforcement response to violence against women and has provided critical services necessary to support women in their struggle to overcome abusive situations".

Some activists opposed the bill. Janice Shaw Crouse, a senior fellow at the Christian Concerned Women for America's Beverly LaHaye Institute, called the act a "boondoggle" which "ends up creating a climate of suspicion where all men are feared or viewed as violent and all women are viewed as victims". She described the act in 2012 as creating a "climate of false accusations, rush to judgment and hidden agendas" and criticized it for failing to address the factors identified by the Centers for Disease Control and Prevention as leading to violent, abusive behavior. Conservative activist Phyllis Schlafly denounced VAWA as a tool to "fill feminist coffers" and argued that the act promoted "divorce, breakup of marriage and hatred of men".

In 2000, the Supreme Court of the United States held part of VAWA unconstitutional on federalism grounds in United States v. Morrison. That decision invalidated only the civil remedy provision of VAWA. The provisions providing program funding were unaffected.

In 2005, the reauthorization of VAWA (as HR3402) defined what population benefited under the term of "Underserved Populations" described as "Populations underserved because of geographic location, underserved racial and ethnic populations, populations underserved because of special needs (such as language barriers, disabilities, alienage status, or age) and any other population determined to be underserved by the Attorney General or by the Secretary of Health and Human Services as appropriate". The reauthorization also "Amends the Omnibus Crime Control and Safe Streets Act of 1968" to "prohibit officials from requiring sex offense victims to submit to a polygraph examination as a condition for proceeding with an investigation or prosecution of a sex offense."

In 2011, the law expired. In 2012 the law was up for reauthorization in Congress. Different versions of the legislation were passed along party lines in the Senate and House, with the Republican-sponsored House version favoring the reduction of services to undocumented immigrants and LGBT individuals. Another area of contention was the provision of the law giving Native American tribal authorities jurisdiction over sex crimes involving non-Native Americans on tribal lands. By repealing a portion of the 1978 Oliphant v. Suquamish ruling, such a provision could alter the constitutional balance between federal, state, and tribal power. Historically Congress has not allowed tribal governments to exercise criminal jurisdiction over non-tribal members. The two bills were pending reconciliation, and a final bill did not reach the president's desk before the end of the year, temporarily ending the coverage of the act after 18 years, as the 112th Congress adjourned.

== 2012–13 legislative battle and reauthorization ==
Senate vote on Violence Against Women Reauthorization Act of 2013 Both yes One yes, one no Both no

When a bill reauthorizing the act was introduced in 2012, it was opposed by conservative Republicans, who objected to extending the act's protections to same-sex couples and to provisions allowing battered foreigners residing in the country illegally to claim temporary visas, also known as U visas. The U visa is restricted to 10,000 applicants annually whereas the number of applicants far exceeds these 10,000 for each fiscal year. In order to be considered for the U visa, one of the requirements for immigrant women is that they need to cooperate in the detention of the abuser. Studies show that 30 to 50% of immigrant women are suffering from physical violence and 62% experience physical or psychological abuse in contrast to only 21% of citizens in the United States.

In April 2012, the Senate voted to reauthorize the Violence Against Women Act, and the House subsequently passed its own measure (omitting provisions of the Senate bill that would protect gays, Native Americans living in reservations, and immigrants who are victims of domestic violence). Reconciliation of the two bills was stymied by procedural measures, leaving the re-authorization in question. The Senate's 2012 re-authorization of VAWA was not brought up for a vote in the House.

In 2013, the question of jurisdiction over offenses in Native American country continued to be at issue over the question of whether defendants who are not tribal members would be treated fairly by tribal courts or afforded constitutional guarantees.

On February 12, 2013, the Senate passed an extension of the Violence Against Women Act by a vote of 78–22. The measure went to the House of Representatives where jurisdiction of tribal courts and inclusion of same-sex couples were expected to be at issue. Possible solutions advanced were permitting either removal or appeal to federal courts by non-tribal defendants. The Senate had tacked on the Trafficking Victims Protection Act, another bone of contention due to a clause which required provision of reproductive health services to victims of sex trafficking.

House vote on Violence Against Women Reauthorization Act of 2013 Democratic aye Republican aye Abstention or no representative seated Republican no

On February 28, 2013, in a 286–138 vote, the House passed the Senate's all-inclusive version of the bill. House Republicans had previously hoped to pass their own version of the measure—one that substantially weakened the bill's protections for certain categories. The stripped-down version, which allowed only limited protection for LGBT and Native Americans, was rejected 257 to 166. The renewed act expanded federal protections to gay, lesbian, and transgender individuals, Native Americans and immigrants.

On March 7, 2013, President Barack Obama signed the Violence Against Women Reauthorization Act of 2013.

== New provisions in the Reauthorization of VAWA 2013 ==
Protection for Native Americans:

Prior to the 2013 passing of VAWA, Native American women who were the victims of non-Native American assault were not covered by the law. The Oliphant v. Suquamish Indian Tribe case from 1978 was overturned by provisions added to the new VAWA 2013, which also makes it possible for non-Native Americans to be prosecuted in tribal courts for domestic or dating violence perpetrated against Native Americans.

Protection of same sex couples:

LGBTQ people experience domestic abuse at the same 25%–33% rate as other members of the community. VAWA 2013 develops programs and laws to protect the rights of LGBTQ people who have been the victims of IPV (intimate partner violence). LGBTQ victims are expressly included in two important VAWA grant programs by the act. It is now against the law for LGBTQ people to be dismissed from shelters or other VAWA-funded services because of their sexual orientation or gender identity, according to a non-discrimination clause in VAWA.

Protection of victims of human trafficking:

Each year, 50,000 individuals are reportedly trafficked into the US, according to the Trafficking Victims Protection Act of 2000. Occasionally, victims of trafficking experience the same forms of abuse as those who have experienced violence from an intimate partner: physical and sexual violence, financial control, threats, intimidation, and restriction on freedom of movement.

Protection for Immigrant Victims of IPV (intimate partner violence):

Neither the number of U Visas nor the government's interest in studying crime in immigrant communities increased as a result of VAWA 2013. Based on data provided by Migration Policy Institute, 18.9 million (12%) of all women in the United States are immigrants. The number of immigrants who have been victims of IPV is unknown because national studies haven't been conducted to look at this issue in immigrant communities.

== After passage ==
A total of 138 House Republicans voted against the version of the act that became law. However, several, including Steve King (R-Iowa), Bill Johnson (R-Ohio), Tim Walberg (R-Michigan), Vicky Hartzler (R-Missouri), Keith Rothfus (R-Pennsylvania), and Tim Murphy (R-Pennsylvania), claimed to have voted in favor of the act. Some have called this claim disingenuous because the group only voted in favor of a GOP proposed alternative version of the bill that did not contain provisions intended to protect gays, lesbians and transgender individuals, Native Americans and undocumented immigrants.

=== Reauthorizations ===
VAWA was reauthorized by bipartisan majorities in Congress in 2000 as part of the Victims of Trafficking and Violence Protection Act of 2000 (H.R. 3244), and again in December 2005, and signed by President George W. Bush. The act's 2012 renewal was opposed by conservative Republicans, who objected to extending the act's protections to same-sex couples and to provisions allowing battered undocumented immigrants to claim temporary visas. Ultimately, VAWA was again reauthorized in 2013, after a long legislative battle throughout 2012–2013.

On September 12, 2013, at an event marking the 19th anniversary of the bill, Vice President Joe Biden criticized the Republicans who slowed the passage of the reauthorization of the act as being "this sort of Neanderthal crowd".

As a result of the United States federal government shutdown of 2018–2019, the Violence Against Women Act expired on December 21, 2018. It was temporarily reauthorized by a short-term spending bill on January 25, 2019, but expired again on February 15, 2019.

On April 4, 2019, the reauthorization act passed in the House by a vote of 263–158, this time including "closing the boyfriend loophole". All Democrats voting were joined by 33 Republicans voted for passage. New York representative Elise Stefanik said Democrats "...have refused to work with Republicans in a meaningful way," adding that she felt the House bill will do nothing but "collect dust" in the GOP-controlled Senate.

On December 9, 2019, after a Houston, Texas police officer on duty was shot and killed by a man who had been abusive towards his girlfriend, Houston police chief Art Acevedo criticized senators Mitch McConnell (R-KY), Ted Cruz (R-TX), and John Cornyn (R-TX) for preventing a vote on the VAWA reauthorization. Acevedo said "I don't want to hear about how much they care about lives and the sanctity of lives yet, we all know in law enforcement that one of the biggest reasons that the Senate and Mitch McConnell and John Cornyn and Ted Cruz and others are not getting into a room and having a conference committee with the House and getting the Violence Against Women's Act (passed) is because the NRA doesn't like the fact that we want to take firearms out of the hands of boyfriends that abuse their girlfriends. And who killed our sergeant? A boyfriend abusing his girlfriend. So you're either here for women and children and our daughters and our sisters and our aunts, or you're here for the NRA."

In a follow-up interview with CNN, Acevedo said his criticism of senators Cruz, Cornyn and McConnell was not political, because "death is not political—you see, death is final." He challenged Senator Cruz to directly answer whether he supports closing the boyfriend loophole, and said that failing to address it would put the senators "on the wrong side of history". Senator Cornyn said that Acevedo was "mistaken" in invoking the VAWA.

On March 15, 2022, President Joe Biden signed the reauthorization of VAWA into law as part of the Consolidated Appropriations Act of 2022 (H.R. 2471); it is called the Violence Against Women Act Reauthorization Act of 2022. The reauthorization act does not include provisions to "close the boyfriend loophole". However, it did include funding the Ensuring Forensic Health Care for all Act (EFCA) to fund support for generalist forensic nurse training.

== Programs and services ==
The Violence Against Women laws provided programs and services, including:

- Federal rape shield law.
- Community violence prevention programs.
- Protections for victims who are evicted from their homes because of events related to domestic violence or stalking.
- Funding for victim assistance services, like rape crisis centers and hotlines.
- Programs to meet the needs of immigrant women and women of different races or ethnicities.
- Programs and services for victims with disabilities.
- Legal aid for survivors of domestic violence.

== Restraining orders ==
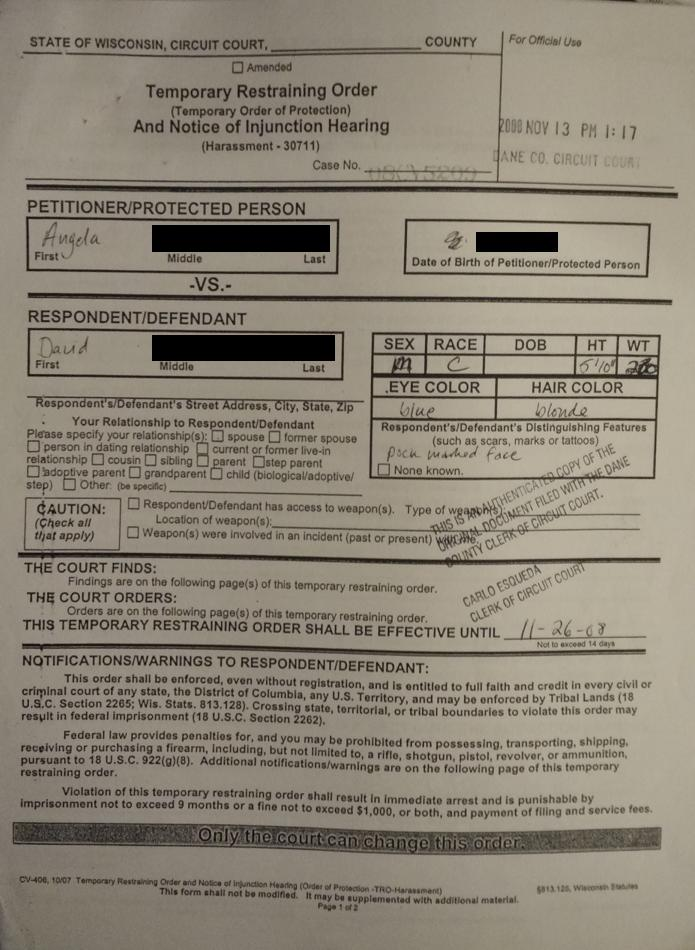
Restraining order granted to a Wisconsin woman against her abuser, noting the nationwide applicability of the order under Full Faith and Credit

When a victim is the beneficiary of an order of protection, per VAWA it was generally enforceable nationwide under the terms of full faith and credit. Although the order may be granted only in a specific state, full faith and credit requires that it be enforced in other states as though the order was granted in their states.18 U.S.C. § 2265 Part of the law's restraining orders included the ability to enforce domestic violence protection orders which barred people subject to family violence protection orders from having firearms.

== Persons who are covered under VAWA immigration provisions ==
VAWA allows for the possibility that certain individuals who might not otherwise be eligible for immigration benefits may petition for US permanent residency on the grounds of a close relationship with a US citizen or permanent resident who has been abusing them. The following persons are eligible to benefit from the immigration provisions of VAWA:

- A wife or husband who has been abused by a U.S. citizen or permanent resident (Green Card holder) spouse. The petition will also cover the petitioner's children under age 21.
- A child abused by a U.S. citizen or permanent resident parent. The petition can be filed by an abused child or by her parent on the child's behalf.
- A parent who has been abused by a U.S. citizen child who is at least 21 years old.

== Coverage of male victims ==
Although the title of the act and the titles of its sections refer to victims of domestic violence as women, the operative text is gender-neutral, providing coverage for male victims as well. Individual organizations have not been successful in using VAWA to provide equal coverage for men. The law has twice been amended in attempts to address this situation. The 2005 reauthorization added a non-exclusivity provision clarifying that the title should not be construed to prohibit male victims from receiving services under the act. The 2013 reauthorization added a non-discrimination provision that prohibits organizations receiving funding under the act from discriminating on the basis of sex, although the law allows an exception for "sex segregation or sex-specific programming" when it is deemed to be "necessary to the essential operations of a program." Jan Brown, the Founder and Executive Director of the Domestic Abuse Helpline for Men and Women contends that the act may not be sufficient to ensure equal access to services.

== College VAWA Reporting ==
According to the Clery Act, colleges are required to federally report certain categories of crimes, including those covered under the Violence Against Women Act (VAWA). Among these crimes, the most frequently reported on campuses are stalking, followed by domestic violence, and dating violence.

== Criticism ==
Activists within the prison abolition movement have been critical of VAWA for what they see as its focus on policing, surveillance, and incarceration, particularly mandatory incarceration requirements, and the disproportionate number of people of color who have been arrested and incarcerated using VAWA provisions. Notable people who have criticized aspects of the VAWA include Victoria Law, Beth Richie, Gina Dent, Olúfẹ́mi O. Táíwò, and Angela Davis.

VAWA has also been criticized by criminal defense attorneys for incentivizing false accusations of domestic violence, so that the accuser may gain immigration benefits. An accusation is enough to start an immigration process under VAWA—as opposed to a conviction or arrest—and many criminal defense attorneys believe domestic violence charges are sometimes motivated by immigration-related intentions. There have been reports of immigrant spouses planning sham marriages for the purpose of falsely accusing lawful permanent residents of domestic violence in order to generate VAWA self-petitions. In one case, a San Diego law firm facilitated over 600 sham marriages in order to take out temporary restraining orders on fabricated domestic violence claims to file fraudulent VAWA petitions.

== Related developments ==
Official federal government groups that have developed, being established by President Barack Obama, in relation to the Violence Against Women Act include the White House Council on Women and Girls and the White House Task Force to Protect Students from Sexual Assault. The ultimate aims of both groups are to help improve and/or protect the well-being and safety of women and girls in the United States.

== See also ==
- International Violence Against Women Act
- Outline of domestic violence
- Violence against men
- Women's shelter
