= Thomas Mathiesen =

Norwegian sociologist (1933–2021)

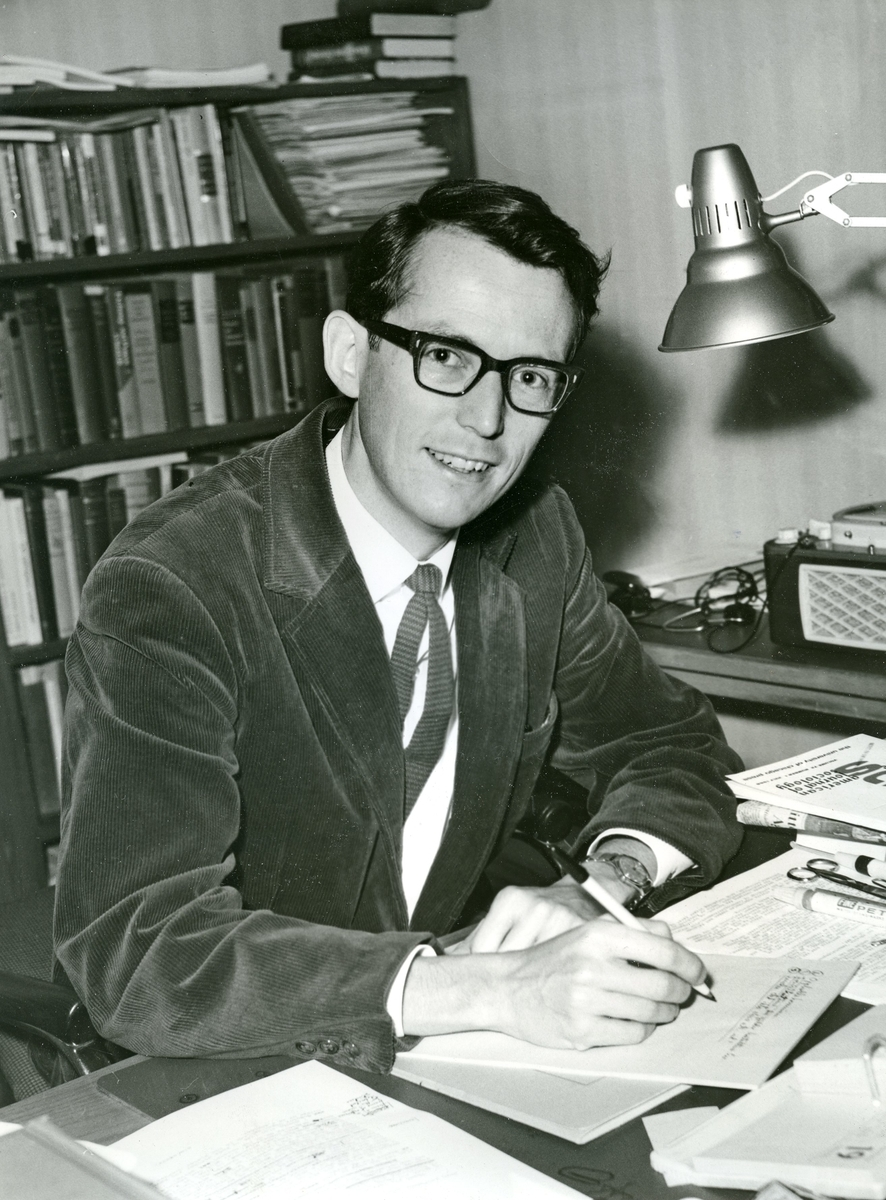
- Thomas Mathiesen in 1965
- Born: 5 October 1933
- Died: 29 May 2021 (aged 87)

Thomas Mathiesen (5 October 1933 – 29 May 2021) was a Norwegian sociologist, particularly known for his work in sociology of law. Considered one of the founders of sociology of law in Norway and, more generally, Scandinavia, Mathiesen did extensive research on prisons, surveillance technology and the power structures within society. Besides criminologist Nils Christie, Mathiesen is one of two Norwegian social scientists covered in the book 50 Key Thinkers in Criminology (Routledge, 2009).

== Life and career ==
Mathiesen grew up in a suburb nearby Oslo, as the only child of Einar Mathiesen (1903–1983) and American-born Birgit Mathiesen (1908–1990). In his youth he appears for a time to have had ambitions of becoming a pianist.

Mathiesen studied sociology at the University of Wisconsin (B.A. 1955). He then returned to Norway, and graduated as M.A. in 1958 (major subject: sociology, minor subject: psychology and social anthropology) from the University of Oslo, where he did his doctorate in 1965 with The Defences of the Weak: A Sociological Study of a Norwegian Correctional Institution, a work which has since been widely cited. Mathiesen's doctoral dissertation was republished by Routledge in 2012 as part of the series Routledge Revivals.

In 1972 Mathiesen was appointed Professor of sociology of law at the Faculty of Law, University of Oslo (emeritus 2004). He was also a visiting researcher at the University of California, Santa Barbara (1967) and University of California, Berkeley (1975), also the University of Warsaw (1988) and the University of Bremen (1988), among other places. Mathiesen was known for his belief in the importance of combining academic work with social activism, maintaining focus on the legal context of prisons simultaneously with his sociological approach. In the Scandinavian countries he was also known for his concept "defined in" and "defined out" as two possible traps a movement may fall into, both equally poisonous.

Together with Nils Christie and Louk Hulsman he was a distinguished representative of the prison abolition movement. He wrote in Norwegian and English, and several of his books have been translated into other languages, including Swedish, Danish, German, Italian, Portuguese, Spanish and Chinese. Some of Mathiesen's books in English include The Politics of Abolition (1974), Law, Society and Political Action (1980), Prison on Trial (1990), Silently Silenced (2004) and Towards a Surveillant Society (2013). His 1965 work The Defences of the Weak was selected for the Norwegian Sociology Canon in 2011.

In the article The Viewer Society: Michel Foucault's 'Panopticon' revisited (1997), Mathiesen presented the concept of the Synopticon or «surveillance of the few by the many», as the sociological reciprocal of Panopticism, which Foucault described in Discipline and Punish (1975). In particular, with his concept of the Synopticon, Mathiesen emphasized the impact of television and the Internet on modern society. Mathiesen's early concerns in the 1990s about the rise of data registration, and how this may arguably compromise personal privacy in society, were recognized as innovative views at the time.

Mathiesen was one of the inspirers of the British prisoners movement, Preservation of the Rights of Prisoners (PROP) and even spoke at their foundation meeting. He also presented a paper at the eleventh symposium of the National Deviancy Conference in September 1972 entitled Strategies of Resistance within a Total Institution.

Mathiesen was awarded an honorary doctorate at Lund University, Sweden in 2003. His autobiography, entitled Cadenza: A Professional Autobiography, was published by British publisher European Group Press in fall 2017.

== See also ==
- Prison abolition movement in the United States

== Publications and articles in English (selections) ==
- Mathiesen, T. (1965) The Defences of the Weak: A Sociological Study of a Norwegian Correctional Institution, London: Tavistock
- Mathiesen, T. (1971) Beyond the Boundaries of Organisations, California: Glendessary Press
- Mathiesen, T. (1974) The Politics of Abolition, London: Martin Robertson
- Mathiesen T. (1975) "The Prison Movement in Scandinavia," In: Bianchi, H., Simondi, M., Taylor, I. (eds) Deviance and Control in Europe, London: John Wiley
- Mathiesen, T. (1980) Law, Society and Political Action: Towards a Strategy Under Late Capitalism, London: Academic Press
- Mathiesen, T. (1983) "The Future of Control Systems - The Case of Norway," In: Garland, D. & Young, P. (eds) The Power to Punish, London: Heinemann
- Mathiesen, T. (1986) "The Politics of Abolition", Contemporary Crises 10: 81–94
- Mathiesen, T. (1990) Prison on Trial: A Critical Assessment, London: Sage
- Mathiesen, T. (1999) On Globalisation of Control: Towards an Integrated Surveillance System in Europe, London: Statewatch
- Mathiesen, T. (2004) Silently Silenced, U.K.: Waterside Press
- Mathiesen, T (2010) "Ten Reasons for Not Building More Prisons," In: McCarthy, M. (ed.), Incarceration and Human Rights. Manchester: University Press
- Mathiesen, T (2012) "Scandinavian Exceptionalism in Penal Matters: Reality or Wishful Thinking?," In: Ugelvik, T., Dullum, J. (ed.), Penal Exceptionalism? : Nordic prison policy and practice. Routledge
- Mathiesen, T. (2013) Towards a Surveillant Society, U.K.: Waterside Press
- Mathiesen, T. et al. (2015) The Politics of Abolition Revisited, U.K.: Routledge
- Mathiesen, T. (2017) Cadenza: A Professional Autobiography, U.K.: European Group Press
- Mathiesen, T. (2018) "Crime Down? Prisons Up?," In: Pavarini, M., Ferrari, L. (ed.), No prison. U.K.: EG Press
