= Peacemaking =

Concept in conflict resolution

Peacemaking is a practical conflict transformation focused upon establishing equitable power relationships robust enough to forestall future conflict, often including the establishment of means of agreeing on ethical decisions within a community, or among parties, that had previously engaged in inappropriate (i.e. violent) responses to conflict. Peacemaking seeks to achieve full reconciliation among adversaries and new mutual understanding among parties and stakeholders. When applied in criminal justice matters, peacemaking is usually called restorative justice, but sometimes also transformative justice, a term coined by the late Canadian justice theorist and activist Ruth Morris. One popular example of peacemaking is the several types of mediation, usually between two parties and involving a third, a facilitator or mediator.

== Methods ==
Some geopolitical entities, such as nation-states and international organizations, attempt to relegate the term peacemaking to large, systemic, often factional conflicts, instances of post-genocide situations, or extreme situations of oppression such as apartheid, in which no member of the community can avoid involvement, and in which no faction or segment can claim to be completely innocent of the problems. However, peacemaking is a universal and age-old approach to conflict at all levels and among any and all parties, and its principles may be generalized and used in many different kinds of conflicts. In contemporary international affairs, especially after the end of the Cold War, the concept of peacemaking has often been associated with the imposition upon warring parties of a peace settlement, usually under the auspices of an international organization. Peacemaking in smaller, traditional societies has often involved rituals. For example, Alula Pankhurst has produced films about peacemaking among Ethiopian communities.

The process of peacemaking is distinct from the rationale of pacifism or the use of non-violent protest or civil disobedience techniques, though they are often practiced by the same people. Indeed, those who master using nonviolent techniques under extreme violent pressure and those who lead others in such resistance, have usually demonstrated the capacity not to react to violent provocation in kind, and thus may be more highly skilled at working with groups of people that may have suffered through violence and oppression, keeping them coordinated and in good order through the necessary, often difficult phases of rapprochement. Given that, and a track record of not advocating violent responses, it is these leaders who are usually most qualified for peacemaking when future conflict breaks out between the previously warring sides.

== Gandhi ==
Mohandas Karamchand Gandhi is widely recognized as an important theorist of peacemaking strategies. He noted in particular that leaders who had been successful at violent strategies were counterproductive in peacetime, simply because these strategies now had to be abandoned. But if a movement had adulated and emulated these people; it was unlikely ever to be able to make permanent peace even with those factions it had conquered or dominated, simply because the leaders lacked the skills and had become leaders in part for their suppression of the other side. Accordingly, even if a movement were to benefit from violent action, and even if such action was extremely effective in ending some other oppression, no movement that sought long-term peace could safely hold up these acts or persons as a moral example or advise emulating either. Gandhi's views have influenced modern ethicists in forming a critique of terrorism, in which even those who support the goals must decry the methods and avoid making, for instance, a suicide bomber into a hero.

== Christianity ==
The Catholic Church has changed its view on peacemaking over the centuries. Some early Christians refused to join Rome's Imperial army. The Just War theory originated with St. Augustine of Hippo in the 5th century. Versions of just war doctrines have claimed that countries and people should keep peace at all costs. The right of a ruler to go to war must meet the criteria of just cause, comparative justice, competent authority, right intention, probability of success, last resort, and proportionality. The Colombian conflict is the prime present-day Catholic example.

The tradition of Christianity continues to be taken up by those who seek peace. Jesus taught, "[...] all who take the sword will perish by the sword." (Matthew 26:52, NAB) Twenty years after the cessation of the Reichskonkordat, Pope Paul VI proclaimed "No more war, war never again!" (Address to United Nations General Assembly, October 4, 1965, retweeted by Pope Francis, September 2, 2013)

== See also ==
- Christian Peacemaker Teams
- List of peace activists
- Peace makers
- Peace Direct
- Peace
- Injustice
- Peacebuilding
- Peacekeeping
- Peace enforcement
- Religion and peacebuilding
- Two-level game theory
