= No New SF Jail Coalition =

The No New SF Jail Coalition is a group whose goals were initially to stop the construction of a $290 million prison at 850 Bryant St. The Coalition consists of "advocates for housing justice, formerly imprisoned people, transgender communities, architects and planners, children of imprisoned people, and concerned residents." The group worked closely with the organization Critical Resistance to see their plans come into action. The proposal by San Francisco Sheriff Ross Mirkarimi was to construct a new $290 million jail in SF. The No New SF Jail Coalition fought against this proposal advocating that the current system was only at 65% capacity, population in SF jails was decreasing, and that prisoners were reporting abuse by the sheriff's deputies. The key goals of the Coalition were to prevent the expansion of jails in San Francisco, as the construction of a new jail would do nothing to combat the real issue of mass incarceration. The campaign began in 2013 and after two years of work in December 2015, the Coalition was victorious in its efforts. The San Francisco Board of Supervisors voted against allocating the money towards the project. Board President London Breed advocated for the cause, believing that instead of building new jails the city needs to focus on putting money towards programs that address mental health and addiction. As a result, the Coalition was successful in its organizing and advocacy towards prison and jail abolition.

== History and background ==
The history behind jail and prison abolition lies in the work of others such as William G. Nagel, Stephen Joseph Perrello, Julia Sudbury, and Rosemary Gido. In correlation with the No New SF Jail Coalition, key themes and issues identified in the work against prison abolition include: the decreasing jail population, mistreatment of prisoners, and the need for prison reform instead of more facilities.

=== Jail population ===
In Rosemary Gido's "Trends in Jail Admission Rates" it is shown that "crowding continues to be the major issue confronting local jails across the country". While there have been groups such as the American Prison Association who have "advocated the establishment of institutions to care for misdemeanants, apart from the crowded jails, only a handful of states established farms for this purpose". For many, the increase of prisoners is the primary reason for an increase in jails, but for the No New SF Jail Coalition, they argue that the jail population is decreasing in San Francisco and therefore a new jail is not needed.

=== Prisoner treatment ===
The mistreatment of prisoners is another theme for the No New SF Jail Coalition's fight against a new jail. They believe that a new jail would only encourage more abuse at the hands of the deputies working at the jails. Alexander M. Capron's article "Medical Research in Prisons" analyzes prisoners who are used as subjects in medical research, and calls into question whether these prisoners actually volunteer for these experiments or if they are coerced into volunteering. Capron questions the morality of the prison system and the value of prisoners. Despite being people who have committed crimes, Capron calls attention to the fact that these are still people, and questions if putting their lives in jeopardy for the sake of research is truly the price they need to pay for their crimes. The No New SF Jail Coalition also aims for the humane treatment of prisoners, as they believe that instead of jails, prisoners are in need of alternative programs.

=== Alternative and reform programs ===
Another theme is the call for less prisons and jails and more programs to promote reform among prisoners that would assist to improve their mental and emotional health. William G. Nagel's articles "A Moratorium On Correctional Construction" and "A Statement on Behalf of a Moratorium on Prison Construction" suggest alternatives to jails and prisons. He believes "the immediate thing to do is call a halt to the building of new prisons, jails, and training school at least for a time, while we plan and develop alternatives". Nagel's past as a deputy gives him insight into the issues that building a new jail would bring as he has witnessed prisoners adapt to the situations in which they are placed. As a result, Nagel "found the inmate community to be distinctly antisocial and it worked against the goals of the larger society and thereby against rehabilitation efforts" therefore, "the behavior of the convicts is determined by the convicts themselves". Due to Nagel's belief that reform efforts do not work, he advocates for alternatives to the prison. Although his solutions are not explicitly stated, he believes that the prison system should be "repudiated and abandoned" instead of creating more prisons and jails. Nagel's beliefs are also echoed by other writers.

Russ Immarigeon, who wrote, "The Context of Jail Litigation in the United States" shares the same sentiment as Nagel, but also focuses on how people can "develop strategies for more systematic use of alternatives to confinement, establish training in non-violent conflict resolution, and other useful projects at their jails, and bring together community support for these changes" which also focuses on the desire for less jails and more alternatives. This is the same sentiment that London Breed shares in the case of the No New SF Jail Coalition. In addition, Jon J. DiIulio wrote "Federal Crime Policy: Time for a Moratorium" which focuses on how juvenile offenders, drug offenders, and violent felons are many of the people being locked up in county jails, and that these prisoners do not need another jail, but instead systems to assist them with their problems and not perpetuate them further. Stephen Joseph Perrello also contributes to this argument as he argues that while jails in San Diego are being given more funds due to overcrowding, these funds are not being put towards the programs that prisoners need most. He calls attention to the fact that more jails are only encouraging people to overlook the lack of programs.

== See also ==
Critical Resistance

Prison–industrial complex

Prison abolition movement

https://nonewsfjail.wordpress.com

https://www.facebook.com/No-New-SF-Jail-Coalition-427674497414328/
