= Critical Resistance =

International organization working to dismantle the prison-industrial complex

Critical Resistance (CR)
- Formation: 1998; 28 years ago
- Founders: Angela Davis; Ruth Wilson Gilmore; Rose Braz
- Type: Social Movement
- Headquarters: Oakland, CA, USA
- Location(s): United States (mainly on the west coast)
- Website: criticalresistance.org

Critical Resistance (CR) is a U.S. based organization with the stated goal of abolishing the prison-industrial complex (PIC). Critical Resistance's national office is in Oakland, California, with three additional chapters in New York City, Los Angeles, and Portland, Oregon. Despite claims of being an internationalist organization, CR has not led any abolitionist campaigns outside of the USA, though individual members have built relationships abroad (mostly in the West).

Critical Resistance has worked towards abolition of the PIC since its first conference in 1998. It considers the prison-industrial complex to be a response to societal issues including but not limited to homelessness, immigration, and gender-based violence. Since 1998 it has taken part in numerous campaigns and projects to close prisons, stop new prisons from being built, address the root cause of interpersonal harm, and promote restorative practices.

== Organization ==
Critical Resistance was founded by Rose Braz, Ruth Wilson Gilmore, Angela Davis, and several others in 1997. The organization is primarily volunteer member-based, with a small number of paid staff members based in Oakland.

Each chapter determines its own work independently. Projects included:

- Contributing to stopping California's prison building boom
- Copwatching
- Coalition-building and participation in the Community in Unity Coalition to stop construction of a 2,000-bed jail in the South Bronx.
- Facilitating education within prisons and the creation of political media by, for, and with prisoners and former prisoners
- Political education
- Building a mass movement for creating genuine safety that does not rely on incarceration and control to address social, economic and political problems

== Mission ==
Critical Resistance takes an abolitionist stance against the prison industrial complex which draws from the legacy of the slavery abolition movement in the 1800s. CR abolitionists view the current prison system as not "broken" as many reformists do, but as working effectively at what they say is its true purpose: to contain, control, and kill those people that the state sees as threats, including people of color, immigrants, and members of the LGBTQ community. CR's goal is not to reform the prison system but to dismantle it completely, and create new ways of accountability and community care. The three key dimensions of Critical Resistance are public policy, community organizing, and academic research. CR utilizes academic work, legislative and other policy interventions, and grassroots campaigns in an effort to reverse the expansion of prisons and to call for the decriminalization of drugs and prostitution. Part of CR's mission statement asserts that it is the provision of basic necessities such as food, shelter, and care - not incarceration and punishment - that will make communities safe and secure.

== Origins ==
Critical Resistance (CR) was formed in 1997. Activists founded CR to address issues of mass incarceration and policing. On September 25–27, 1998, Critical Resistance held its first conference at the University of California, Berkeley. Over 3,500 participants attended, including former and current prisoners and their families, activists, academics, religious leaders, homeless people, policymakers, and members of the LGBTQ community. This conference challenged what it called the prison industrial complex (PIC). Critical Resistance says that the government has commodified prisons as desirable and, in return, has gained public support to expand prisons. CR's initial international conference put the term "prison-industrial complex" on the national agenda with the goal of convincing the American public to stop mass incarceration. CR's mission statement supports abolishing the PIC, and promotes the idea that capitalism profits from incarceration, particularly the incarceration of people of color, women, and the poor. The conference encouraged different organizations to engage in activism. In particular, the "Schools Not Jails" initiative and the Youthforce Coalition began to combat what they called the "criminalization of youth of color" after the conference.

== Campaigns and projects ==
Critical Resistance holds conferences as a strategy to open discussion about prisons, gain insight from different activists and participants, and spread information to different parts of the United States. CR hosted more conferences through Critical Resistance South in New Orleans and Critical Resistance East in New York. Critical Resistance has been working on numerous campaigns and projects to abolish prisons locally, nationally, and worldwide.

The Prisoner Mail Working Group in CR receives letters from prisoners regularly in order to stay connected to them and understand what is happening in prisons. CR says it is crucial that the voices of diverse communities are heard, especially prisoners, in order to create a collective dialogue that can expose the reality of prisons.

CR has worked on campaigns to overturn California's Juvenile Crime Initiative (California Proposition 21) and to stop the California Department of Corrections from building a 5160-bed occupancy prison with the cost of $335 million in Central Valley. In 2001, CR filed a lawsuit against the CDC that generated significant media coverage. CR worked with the California Prison Moratorium Project in bringing together a coalition of environmentalists, farm workers unions, Latino and immigrant advocates, and prison abolition activists. The courts have since delayed construction of the prison.

CR has also worked closely with The San Francisco Jail Fight Coalition (also known as the "No New SF Jail Coalition") and successfully stopped a proposal for a $456 million prison building project. CR proposed that the costs of building a new jail system was too high and wasteful because there was already a lot of jail space in the county. Instead, they believed that the funds could be used in welfare, public health, and affordable housing in the community.

Beyond Attica: Close Prisons-Build Communities is an ongoing campaign that demands the closure of Attica Prison in New York state. CR collects data, pictures, and interview records of former prisoners to reveal inhuman punishments and human rights violations that have occurred inside the prison since the year of its opening in the 1930s. It plans to use this evidence to gain public support and make a case for the closure of the prison.

The Abolitionist Educators support campaign works with educators and scholars to inform students and the imprisoned by writing about abolitionist issues in The Abolitionist newspaper, doing guest presentations in universities and K-12 systems, and teaching these issues in their own classrooms. According to CR's 2014 annual report, the purpose of The Abolitionist newspaper is to "share political analysis with imprisoned people, increase inside-outside communication, and augment organizing capacity inside prison walls".

CR Film Festival and Video Series works to create documentaries to "recognize the importance of cultural work in the fight against the PIC."

CR collaborates with the organization A New Way of Life founded by Susan Burton as part of the Leadership, Education, Action and Dialogue Project (LEAD) to hold workshops that share experiences of formerly incarcerated women and educate the participants about prisons.

According to Critical Resistance The Oakland Power Projects was launched in March 2015 to educate and train community members on how to properly handle local safety issues without the involvement of the police. The project consists of several workshops taught by instructors ranging from doctors, nurses, and healthcare specialist that discuss the impact of how to properly address people that are found in states of distress due to minor physical harm and mental disorder.

Stop Urban Shield is a project initiated by the Oakland Chapter. Established in 2007, Urban Shield is a Bay Area expo that further trains law enforcement. There, law enforcement can undergo SWAT and tactical trainings in order respond to emergencies. Critical Resistance works to stop Urban Shield in Alameda County by means of protesting and defunding the expo through the county.

== INCITE! partnership ==
The women's anti-violence group INCITE! and Critical Resistance partnered to create a statement on gender violence and its connection to the PIC. According to Kristian Williams, this partnership was formed because the lack of attention paid to violence within communities, and the ignoring of the experiences of survivors of domestic abuse and other gender crimes, caused tensions within the feminist movement which limited the overall success of Critical Resistance. The statement was published in 2001 and declares that the prison abolition movement must address gender violence and that social movements must not work in isolation, but rather in inter-sectional coalition. It states that both organizations share common struggles and common goals in working to deconstruct what both see as the sexism, racism, classism and homophobia that exists in the criminal justice system. The statement analyzes ways it finds women to be disproportionately targeted by the justice system and identifies strategies for combating these injustices.

== Timeline ==
- 1998 - "Critical Resistance to the Prison Industrial Complex" conference in Berkeley, California. In September 1998, Critical Resistance held its first conference which challenged the phenomenon it called the prison industrial complex (PIC).
- 1998 - Formation of Critical Resistance Youth Force, a coalition of Bay Area youth organizations. It was co-directed by Anita Miralle De Asis & Rory Caygill, and at its height had 40 plus organizations in membership. The coalition mobilized thousands of youth to organize against Prop 21 legislation and to run the Books Not Bars ("fund schools, not jails.") campaign. It mobilized hundreds of Bay Area youth to protest the 2000 Democratic National Convention in Los Angeles and the World Trade Organization meeting in Washington, DC.
- 1998 - Several thousand high school students staged a walkout to demand "Schools Not Jails."
- 2001 - Critical Resistance East Conference held in New York City.
- 2001 - Publication of INCITE! "Critical Resistance-Incite! Statement on Gender violence and the Prison Industrial Complex".
- 2001- In spring 2001, CR filed an environment lawsuit against the California Department of Corrections that has since prevented the construction of a 5160-bed prison in California's Central Valley.
- 2003 - Critical Resistance South Conference in Tremé, New Orleans. It targeted problems in women's prisons and held workshops that dealt with issues such as personal violence, drug addiction for pregnant women, prison conditions for the LGBTQ community.
- 2005 - Helped bring about the end of California's prison building boom; featured in The Christian Science Monitor, Los Angeles Times, and others. Launched amnesty campaign for people accused of looting post-Hurricane Katrina across the country.
- 2008 - On September 26–28, 2008, Critical Resistance held its 10th Anniversary (CR10) conference in Oakland, CA. The 3-day conference focused on strategizing, collaborating, and organizing for abolishing the prisons. It included workshops, film showings, cultural art performances, strategy sessions, and meetings. A large number of youth, people of color and members of the LGBT community attended and participated in conference activities.
- 2013 - CR worked with the No New SF Jail Coalition to stop the proposal for a $456 million jail project.
- 2014 - CR distributed 12,000 issues of The Abolitionist paper that includes stories of those who are imprisoned.
- As of 2026, CR is still active, holding regular member retreats and engaging in abolitionist campaigns across the United States

== See also ==
- The Sentencing Project
