= Val Kalei Kanuha =

American educator and activist

Valli Kalei Kanuha is a Native Hawaiian-Asian lesbian-feminist, Indigenous scholar, educator, and activist on gender violence and social justice focused on Native Hawaiian/Indigenous peoples, people of color and LGBTQIMahu communities.

== Early life and education ==
Kanuha was born and raised in Hilo, Hawaii, United States, in the 1950s. Her Nisei mother, the daughter of a Japanese picture bride and her father Kanaka 'Oiwi were both born and spent their entire lives in Hawaiʻi. Kanuha received her bachelor's degree in social work from the University of Wisconsin , master's in social work (MSW) from the University of Minnesota and her PhD in social welfare from the University of Washington's (UW) School of Social Work.

== Scholarship ==
Kanuha has been a national and international trainer, scholar, and organizational consultant on anti-oppression issues, social justice, and gender violence issues. She taught briefly at Hunter College and at the University of Hawaiʻi at Hilo in the 1990s. From 1997 to 2016, after receiving her PhD, Kanuha was faculty in social work, and sociology at the University of Hawai’i at Mānoa (UH) Most of her scholarly work and research focuses on sexual assault and intimate partner violence, including partner violence in women's same-sex relationships, historical/cultural trauma, and designing and implementing the first and only research-based domestic violence intervention based on Native Hawaiian cultural traditions and practices (transformative and restorative justice). In 2017, she left her position as a professor in the Sociology Department at UH and joined the University of Washington School of Social Work as Assistant Dean for Field Education. At the UW School of Social Work, Kanuha has also served as the inaugural Assistant Dean for Diversity, Equity and Inclusion, MSW Program Director, and Associate Dean for Academic Affairs. Professor Kanuha teaches courses on qualitative research, focusing on grounded theory methods, sexual and domestic violence, and historical and cultural trauma. .

== Activism ==
Kanuha was an early activist and organizer in the U.S. based battered women's movement in the early 1970s . She is considered among the founding members of the first battered women's coalitions based in Minneapolis, Minnesota, which also opened Women's Advocates in St. Paul, considered the first dedicated shelter for domestic violence survivors and their children in the U.S. She is the first Asian-Pacific Islander-Native Hawaiian lesbian of color anti-violence movement advocates in the U.S. and is still the only Indigenous lesbian feminist scholar and practitioner whose research, practice, and activism have focused on intimate violence. Professor Kanuha was the first woman of color to speak, write, and publish on same-sex domestic violence in lesbian relationships addressing the intersection of race and gender. She is a founding member of Incite! Women of Color Against Violence, an organization of queer, feminist, and Indigenous and other women of color, whose work has greatly contributed to fighting State and interpersonal violence against women, gender non-conforming, and trans people of color. For the past 50 years, Kanuha has been actively involved in local and national social justice advocacy on behalf of Hawaiian, Native American, people of color, LGBTQMahu, and other socially marginalized communities dealing with family violence, and State-sponsored violence Kanuha served as a national Board member of the Joyful Heart Foundation founded in 2004 by advocate and actor Mariska Hargitay of Law and Order: SVU, and board member with API Chaya in Seattle serving API and other communities dealing with intimate and sexual violence, trafficking and community violence . She was also a co-founder of the University of Hawaiʻi at Hilo Women's Center.

In the 1990s, Professor Kanuha lived and worked in New York City at the height of the HIV/AIDS epidemic. Employed first at the Gay Men's Health Crisis (GMHC), Kanuha coordinated the volunteer teams of AIDS buddies providing home care, advocacy, and other services for people with AIDS, then became assistant director of Education where she oversaw all community-based educational programs, including condom distribution and educational workshops in bars, bath houses, and clubs. Her team of primarily gay men of color educators was actively engaged in outreach when house and drag ballrooms were emerging around New York City in the 1990s, working with gay and bisexual trans and straight Black and Latino men involved in voguing culture. She moved from GMHC to the Hetrick Martin Institute and the Hunter College Center for AIDS, Drugs and Community Health as deputy director for Programs at both organizations developing outreach HIV programs for street youth and educational workshops for schools, agencies, and medical centers on infectious disease. As the only API-Native Hawaiian HIV/AIDS activist in New York in the 1990s, Kanuha was among the co-founders of the Asian Pacific Islander Center on HIV/AIDS, now APICHA Community Health Center.

== Personal life ==
Kanuha and her partner Kata Issari have been in a committed relationship since 1994, and have a daughter.

== Articles and other works ==
- Colonization and Violence Against Women, 2002
- Transcript of Panel on Colonization, Culture, and Resistance, 2015
- Relationships So Loving and So Hurtful": The Constructed Duality of Sexual and Racial/Ethnic Intimacy in the Context of Violence in Asian and Pacific Islander Lesbian and Queer Women's Relationships, 2013
- Strange Bedfellows: Feminist Advocates and U.S. Marines Working to End Violence, 2004
- The Use of Temporary Restraining Orders (TROs) as a Strategy to Address Intimate Partner Violence, 2004
- HIV and women in Hawaii: risk and protective factors in HIV/AIDS prevention, 2003
- The impact of sexuality and race/ethnicity on HIV/AIDS risk among Asian and Pacific Island American (A/PIA) gay and bisexual men in Hawai'i, 2001
- "Being" Native versus "Going Native": Conducting Social Work Research as an Insider, 2000
- The social process of "passing" to manage stigma: Acts of internalized oppression or acts of resistance? (1999)
- Local and gay: addressing the health needs of Asian and Pacific Islander American (A/PIA) lesbians and gay men in Hawaii (1999)
