= Louk Hulsman =

Dutch legal scientist and criminologist

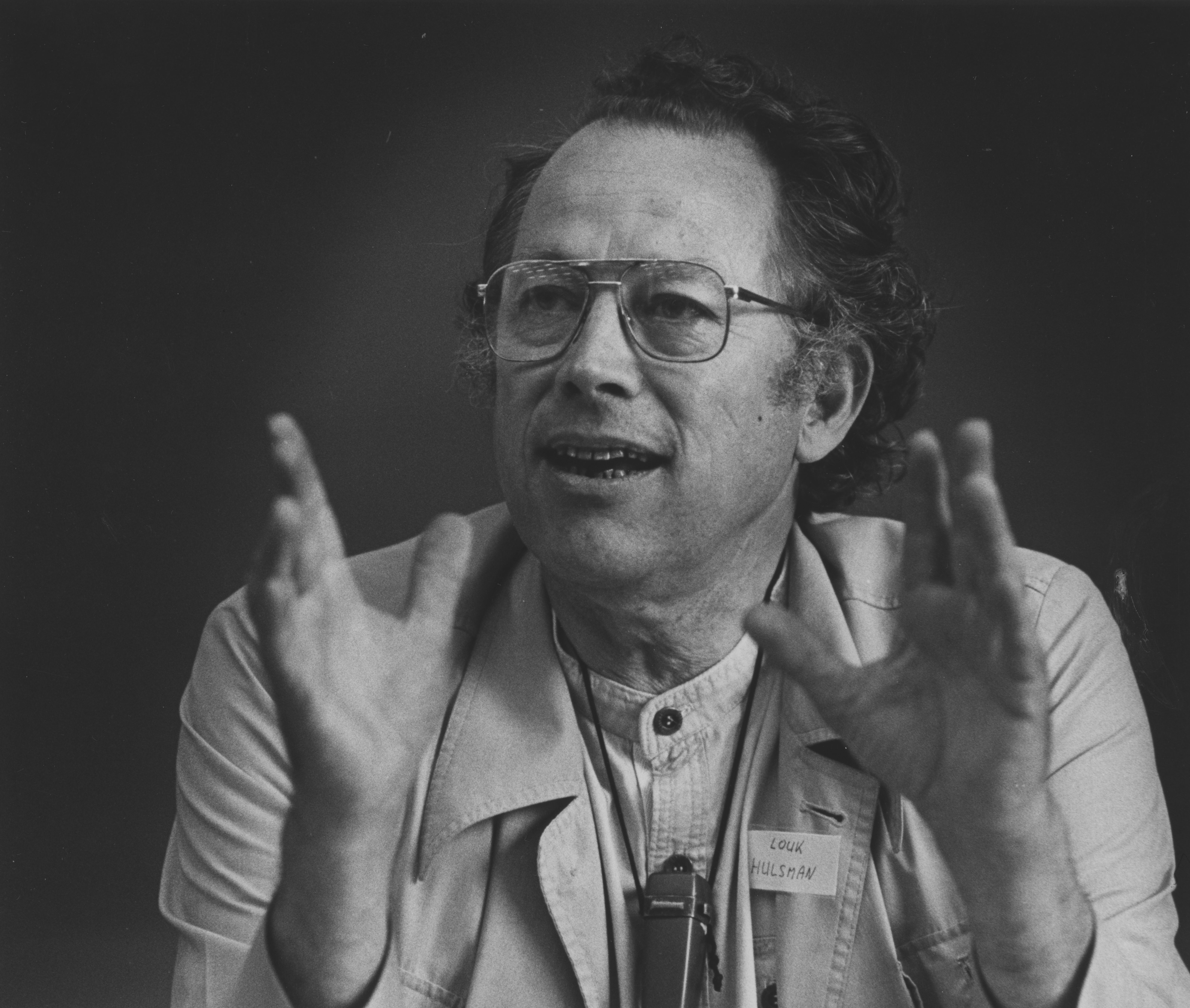
Portrait of L. Hulsman, 1982

Lodewijk Henri Christian Hulsman, known as Louk Hulsman (8 March 1923 in Kerkrade – 28 January 2009 in Dordrecht) was a Dutch legal scientist and criminologist.

== Life ==
According to Hulsman, his childhood and adolescence were marked by the time he spent in a religious boarding school that left him traumatized. After graduating from school Hulsman was involved in a resistance movement during World War II. In 1944 he was convicted of using counterfeit identification papers and imprisoned at the Amersfoort concentration camp. While being transferred to Germany he successfully escaped. After returning to the Netherlands he joined the Allied troops as a soldier during the last weeks of the Second World War. Hulsman later recalled how some members of his resistance movement had stolen weapons and clothing even from other Allied troops during the war.

From 1945 to 1948 Hulsman studied jurisprudence at Leiden University. After his exams he first worked for the Dutch Ministry of War and later for the Dutch Ministry of Justice. In 1963 he became a professor for criminal law and criminology at the Netherlands School of Economics, the later Erasmus University Rotterdam (emeritus 1986). He is a main author of the Council of the European Union’s influential report on decriminalization.

He last lectured at the Academia Vitae in Deventer.

Together with Nils Christie and Thomas Mathiesen he is a prominent representative of the prison abolition movement.

== Publication & Articles (selection) ==
- Louk H.C. Hulsman/Jacqueline Bernat de Celis (1982): Peines Perdues. Le système pénal en question. Paris.
- Louk H.C. Hulsman (1983): Abolire il sistema penale?, in: Dei delitti e delle pene 1, pg.71-89.
- Louk H.C. Hulsman (1986): Critical Criminology and the Concept of Crime, in: Contemporary Crises, 10 (3-4), pg.63-80.
- Liber Amicorum Louk Hulsman: Social problems and criminal justice (1987), Juridisch Instituut, Erasmus Universiteit Rotterdam
- Louk H.C. Hulsman (1991): The Abolitionist Case: Alternative Crime Policies, in: The Israel Law Review 25 (2-4), pg.681-709.
