= Ruth Morris =

Ruth Rittenhouse Morris
- Born: 12 December 1933; United States
- Died: 17 September 2001 (aged 67)
- Occupations: Advocate of transformative justice and prison abolition
- Writing career
- Language: English

Ruth Rittenhouse Morris, CM (12 December 1933 – September 17, 2001) was a Canadian author and legal reformer.

== Biography ==
Ruth Morris was one of the world's leading spokespersons for prison abolition and transformative justice. Her activism for peace, racial justice, and antipoverty causes led her into the issues of the penal system. Ruth Morris was an active member of the Religious Society of Friends (Quakers) and was the coordinator of the Canadian Friends Service Committee in Toronto from 1975 to 1978. She played an active part in the Quaker Committee on Jails and Justice, which helped Canadian Quakers become the first religious body in the world to endorse prison abolition (by consensus). Ruth Morris was also a founder of the International Conference on Prison Abolition, which continues to this day.

Ruth Morris had a hand in establishing many groups and networks, including: My Brother's Place (a halfway house), Toronto Justice Council, St. Stephen's Conflict Resolution Service, the Corner (drop-in center for street people), Toronto Bail Program, the Coalition Against Neighborhoodism, and the Black Creek Anti-Drug Focus Coalition. She received many awards, including a Service to the Homeless Award from the Ontario Government (1987); Prison Volunteer of the Year (1987); a Governor General's Award for her community work (1993); the Addiction Research Foundation community-building award (1995); the YMCA Peace Medallion (1998); the Ron Wiebe Restorative Justice Award (2000); the J.S. Woodsworth Award for the Elimination of Racial Discrimination (2000); and, the year she died, the Order of Canada (2001).

She was appointed a Member of the Order of Canada (May 30, 2001). The citation reads as follows:

She is a model for those who seek to serve others. A longtime advocate for justice reform, at the request of the Ontario government, she founded a groundbreaking program which made it possible for many to receive bail who would not have previously qualified. She also founded Toronto's first bail residence, as well as a halfway house for ex-offenders. Generous with her time and resources, she used her caring and dynamism to launch many other innovations in Toronto. These include a community project aimed at improving banking services for disadvantaged citizens, a drop-in centre for street people and a multicultural, multilingual conflict resolution service.

Despite her many awards, Ruth Morris also considered her failures as important as her successes, and was proud of her two firings from justice system jobs for her human rights stands (discussed in her book Transcending Trauma), and of having continued her career more effectively beyond these traumatic experiences. Ruth Morris also founded Rittenhouse: A New Vision, an agency dedicated to public education for transformative justice.

Her published books include Transcending Trauma (2005), Stories of Transformative Justice (2000), Penal Abolition: The Practical Choice (2000), Street People Speak (1987) and Crumbling Walls: Why Prisons Fail (1989).

Morris died September 17, 2001, from her second bout of cancer. She named the tumor "Henry."

=== Academic and work background ===
In 1956, Ruth received her BA in music and sociology from Oberlin College. She followed up with an MA in sociology in 1958 from the University of Illinois. Her thesis was on the "Role of Conscientious Objectors in U.S. Prisons, 1914-1957." Not content to stop there, she also did her MSW, graduating in 1959 from the University of Michigan with a thesis on "Friendship Patterns in an Institution for Delinquent Girls." In 1963 she also received her PhD from the University of Michigan in sociology and social Work. Her dissertation was "A Theory and Comparison of Female and Male Delinquents and Non-Delinquents."

She also taught, led workshops, and lectured widely—including the Graduate School of Theology, University of Toronto; York University in Toronto; and American University in Washington, D.C. -- in the areas of introduction to sociology, sociology of health and illness, crime and delinquency, race and ethnic relations, social movements, sociology of poverty, contemporary communities, and introduction to social work. She also taught the theory and techniques of conflict resolution to many groups of volunteers and spoke widely about penal abolition, justice, and related issues throughout Canada and the U.S., and also in New Zealand, Mexico, Costa Rica, and Argentina.

From 1995 to 2001 she held the position of educational director for Rittenhouse. At the same time, she was, from 1990 to 2000, coordinator of the Black Creek Anti-Drug Focus Community Coalition (now PEACH) in the Jane-Finch neighbourhood of North York, Ontario. She was executive director of the John Howard Society of Metro Toronto from 1987 to 1990, programme director of St. Stephen's Community House in Toronto from 1984 to 1987, director of the Toronto-York Bail Programme from 1979 to 1983 and coordinator of the Canadian Friends Service Committee from 1975 to 1978.

== Major published books/works ==
- 2005 Transcending Trauma (with Ruth Bradley-St-Cyr), Embrun, Ontario: Winding Trail Press.
- 2001 Dr. Angelina Bean in Oz (children's book), Belem, NM: TOTCLF Press.
- 2000 Penalty and Corporate Rule (ed. with Giselle Dias), Toronto: Canadian Scholars' Press.
- 2000 The Case for Penal Abolition (ed. with Gordon West), Toronto: Canadian Scholars' Press.
- 2000 Stories of Transformative Justice, Toronto: Canadian Scholars' Press.
- 1997 Listen, Ontario: Faith Communities Speak Out (edited volume), Oakville: Mosaic Press.
- 1995 Penal Abolition: The Practical Choice, Toronto: Canadian Scholars' Press. (Spanish edition, El abolicionismo penal, trans. José Menna Viale. Ed. Universidad Litoral, Argentina, 2000.)
- 1993 "Jane-Finch: Corner of 100 Lands", Play performed at Jane-Finch Multicultural Festival1993 The Flying Bus of Oz, (children's book), Buckethead Enterprises, Albuquerque, NM.
- 1989 Crumbling Walls: Why Prisons Fail, Oakville: Mosaic Press.
- 1989 Christian Faith in Action. Burlington, Ont.: Welch.
- 1987 Street People Speak (with C. Heffren), Oakville: Mosaic Press.
- 1987 "Behind Prison Doors" in E. Adelberg & C. Currie (eds.) Too Few to Count: Canadian Women in Conflict with the Law. Vancouver: Press Gang (with E. Elliott).
- 1987 Journey to Joy (with Marie Ottosen), Red Deer, Alta: Cortland.

=== Selected publications in periodicals ===
- 1994 "The Three Suits of Racism or, A Rose by Any Other Name", Accord 13 (1): 9–10.
- 1994 "Not Enough", Mediation Quarterly, summer.
- 1993 "Why Did Christopher Die?", Canadian Dimension 27(1), Jan-Feb.,11-16; reprinted in The Other Side, 1993.
- 1991 "Learning to Ask the Right Questions," Critical Criminologist, Vol 3 (3).
- 1990 "Group Justice is no justice at all", Opinion Editorial, Globe & Mail, Feb. 2.
- 1989 "What to do with dangerous offenders", Canadian Dimension 23(2), March.
- 1988 "Beyond the Barrier of Grief", Friends' Journal, January.
- 1988 "Why halfway houses are key to rehabilitation", Opinion Editorial, Toronto Star, March 11.
- 1987 "Bettina Harris: a 24-year-old describes half her life in prisons", Canadian Dimension 21(1), Feb.
- 1986 "The Noose, the Chair and the Needle", Canadian Dimension 20(3), May.
- 1985 "One Indian's as Good as Another", Canadian Dimension 19(5), Dec.
- 1985 "Prison Overcrowding", Canadian Dimension 19(3), Aug.
- 1984 "Prison Abolition: Lunacy or Practical Goal?" Canadian Dimension 18(2), June.
- 1982 "Loving Farthest Out", Friends' Journal, May.
- 1982 "Chronology of a Concern" (reprinted in D. Brooke, "Imprisonment: Initiatives of Conscience by British and Canadian Friends") Friends' Quarterly, March.
- 1981 "Beyond Security", Friends' Journal, March.
- 1981 "Toronto Bail Program", International Journal of Offender Therapy and Comparative Criminology 25(2).
- 1980 "The Other Wise Guy", Friends' Journal, March.

=== Pamphlets and Reports on Justice Issues ===
- 1999 The Penal System - Linchpin of the Corporate Agenda, 16 pp.
- 1999 Why Transformative Justice?, 12 pp.
- 1997 We're Being Cheated. Corporate and Welfare Fraud - The Hidden Story (with Harry Glasbeek and Dianne Martin), 16 pp.
- 1997 Keys to Hope and Action, 20 pp.
- 1994 A Practical Path to Transformative Justice, 12 pp.
- 1994 Just Give Us the Facts: Statistics and Facts on Criminal Justice, 12 pp.
- 1994 But What About the Dangerous Few?, 12 pp.
- 1994 Community Alternatives to Prison, 2nd. ed., 12 pp.
- 1994 How Do We Convince the Public?, 16 pp.
- 1991 Restorative Justice: Path to the Future, 20 pp.
- 1984 "Beyond Security" in Mennonite Central Committee (eds.) Crime is a Peace Issue: Readings on Issues in the Criminal Justice System. Winnipeg: Mennonite Central Committee, pp. V.22 - V.29.
- 1983 Are We Serving the Target Group? An Evaluation of the Toronto-York Bail Program. Toronto: Toronto-York Bail Program, 25 pp.
- 1983 "Introduction: What Prison Abolition is all about" in Proceedings of the First International Conference on Prison Abolition, Toronto.
- 1983 Seeds of Abolition. Toronto: Quaker Committee on Jails & Justice, 33 pp.
- 1980 Creative Alternatives to Prison. Toronto: Toronto Justice Council, 8 pp.
