= Black and Pink =

United States prison abolitionist organization

- Black and Pink logo
- Founder: Jason Lydon
- Founded at: Boston, Massachusetts
- Type: Non-profit
- Purpose: Prison abolition, LGBTQ and HIV-positive inmate support
- Headquarters: Omaha, Nebraska
- Executive Director: Jasmine Tasaki and Tena Hahn-Rodriguez
- Website: www.blackandpink.org

Black and Pink is a United States prison abolitionist organization supporting LGBTQ and HIV-positive prisoners. The group organizes a pen pal program, distributes a prisoner-written newspaper to its incarcerated members, provides court accompaniment, and educates people on their rights.

== History ==
Black and Pink was founded in Boston, Massachusetts, in 2004–2005 by Jason Lydon, a Unitarian Universalist minister and prison abolitionist. Lydon had been active in prison justice work as a teenager, and decided to form Black and Pink after spending six months in county jail when he was twenty years old. Lydon was the National Director of the group until stepping down in September 2017. He was succeeded by Tray Johns, who served as National Director until Dominique Morgan was appointed Interim National Director in December 2017. In January 2018 Morgan accepted the position of National Director on a permanent basis. The organization's current executive director is Dr. Tatyana Moaton. Black and Pink's national office is based in Omaha, Nebraska.

== Work ==
=== Pen pal program ===
Black and Pink maintains a pen pal program in which they match their incarcerated members with pen pals who correspond, build relationships, and participate in harm reduction. The group states that receiving correspondence is itself a harm reduction strategy, saying that potentially abusive guards and prisoners are made aware that the recipient has a support network outside of prison when they hear the recipient's name called at the mail room, and may be less likely to target that prisoner as a result.

=== Newspaper ===
Black and Pink publishes a newspaper that they distribute to prisoners for free. They began distributing the newspaper in 2010, and as of October 2017, they distribute the newspaper to 13,000 prisoners across the United States. The newspaper contains submissions from incarcerated Black and Pink members, as well as material from people who are not in prison. Because of regulations surrounding materials allowed to be sent to prisoners, the newspaper is denied from many prisons, including all prisons in the state of Kentucky.

=== Other work ===
In 2016, Black and Pink collaborated with Tatiana von Fürstenberg to organize an art exhibition called On the Inside in New York at the Abrons Art Center. The exhibit featured several dozen pieces of artwork from prisoners. Because art supplies are difficult to obtain within many prisons, some of the pieces use unconventional materials such as envelopes and ink made from melted magazines.
