= Elizabeth Bernstein =

American sociologist

- Born: October 10, 1968 (age 58)
- Occupation: Academic
- Awards: Norbert Elias Prize (2009)

Academic background
- Education: University of California, Berkeley

Academic work
- Discipline: Sociology
- Sub-discipline: Sexuality, gender
- Institutions: Barnard College
- Notable ideas: Carceral feminism

Elizabeth Bernstein (born 10 October 1968) is an American sociologist who is noted for her studies that focus on women, gender, and sexuality. She is also a professor at Columbia University's Barnard College.

== Education ==
Bernstein completed her B.A., M.A., and Ph.D. from the University of California, Berkeley in 2001.

== Works ==
Bernstein is particularly known for her research on sex work and the sex trafficking of women. In a study, for example, she suggested that sex work can be meaningful for both client and sex worker as it involves a particular form of emotional labor. This was explored in her book Temporarily Yours, which compiled decades of research involving prostitutes and observations made in brothels and police holding tanks, and after interviews with policymakers and startups.

She is also credited for introducing the term "carceral feminism", which refers to a movement within feminism that has "relied upon strategies of incarceration as their chief tool of ‘justice’" to suppress sex work, treating it as tantamount to sex trafficking and slavery. This concept describes how some feminist activists have collaborated with Christian evangelicals and the state systems of power with the stated intent to help women. Bernstein explained that this development has led to carceral paradigm of social justice as well as militarized humanitarianism. She criticized this phenomenon in a series of articles noting that the increased criminalization of sex work has disadvantaged people of color as these are the most likely arrested as its offenders.

Aside from gender and sexuality, Bernstein's research and scholarship also focused on the sociology of law, the contemporary social theory as well as the link between the feminist, neoliberal, and evangelical Christian interests, including its role in contemporary U.S. policymaking concerning human trafficking. From 2007 to 2009, Bernstein worked with the United Nations Research Institute for Social Development (UNRISD). She was part of the project Religion, Gender, and Politics, and completed several studies such as country research report on the United States and The Unhappy Marriage of Religion and Politics: Problems and Pitfalls for Gender Equality (2010).

== Awards ==
Bernstein's work has been recognized by the National Science Foundation, the Social Science Research Council, American Association of University Women (AAUW), the Mellon Foundation, and the American Sociological Association.
