= Transformative justice =

Series of practices and philosophies designed to create change in social systems

Transformative justice is a spectrum of social, economic, legal, and political practices and philosophies that aim to focus on the structures and underlying conditions that perpetuate harm and injustice. Taking up and expanding on the goals of restorative justice such as individual/community accountability, reparation, and non-retributive responses to harm, transformative justice imagines and puts into practice alternatives to the formal, state-based criminal justice system.

== Overview ==
As defined by American activist Mariame Kaba, transformative justice is a framework that focuses on community-building and collective solidarity against the repressive mechanisms of the carceral state. First popularized by Queer, Black, Indigenous, Latino, and other marginalized communities due to their perception that they were unable to rely on the police and the courts to obtain justice after being victimized by interpersonal harm (such as hate crimes, sexual assaults, and domestic violence), it prioritizes the relationships between the individual, the communities to which they are accountable, and the broader systems and surrounding environment in which we are implicated. Contemporary transformative justice theorizing traces its lineage to other anti-carceral and abolitionist social movements as led by Black, Indigenous, and other racialized communities who are often directly harmed by the carceral state.

Transformative justice aims to resist and divest from traditional methods of state-sanctioned punishment such as police, prisons, the judiciary, and juvenile delinquency programs. Premised on the recognition that these institutions frequently inflict compounding harm on individuals through surveillance and social control, transformative justice advocates look to move away from the ways in which the criminal justice system perpetuates harm both within prisons and communities on the outside.

Transformative justice also rests on the belief that interpersonal harm interacts with and reflects systemic and institutional mechanisms of oppression. For instance, sexual assault mirrors the patriarchal conception of women as devoid of personal agency. Therefore, transformative justice recognizes that addressing individual interpersonal harm and conflict must simultaneously aim to dismantle systemic structures of power (such as patriarchy, cisnormativity, racism, ableism, and colonialism). To this end, transformative justice applies a systems approach, seeking to see problems as not only evidence of crime but also as a catalyst for crime. With respect to those impacted, it aims to recognize instances of harm as an opportunity for a transformative, relational, and educational intervention for victims, offenders, and the broader community. In this light, applications of transformative justice practices can meaningfully apply even between people who have had no prior contact.

Transformative justice takes the principles and practices of restorative justice beyond the criminal justice system. It applies to areas such as environmental law, corporate law, labor-management relations, consumer bankruptcy and debt, and family law. Transformative justice uses a systems approach, seeking to see problems, as not only the beginning of the crime but also the causes of crime, and tries to treat an offense as a transformative relational and educational opportunity for victims, offenders and all other members of the affected community. In theory, a transformative justice model can apply even between peoples with no prior contact.

Writer and transformative justice practitioner adrienne maree brown contends that transformative justice cannot occur if the reaction to each committed transgression is one of a public takedown (reminiscent of cancel culture). brown calls out the hypocrisy of thinkers in the transformative justice movement who reproduce the very forms of retribution and violence in their disagreements that transformative justice seeks to subvert. Additionally, brown offers practical considerations to reflect on in situations of conflict in the goal of a collective pivot to transformative justice:

- deliberate listening with the goal of understanding the contexts that enabled a specific harm;
- learning from each conflict to help facilitate introspection;
- considering alternatives to public confrontation in response to conflict, such as personal exchange to breed trust, resilience and interdependence.

Transformative justice can be seen as a general philosophical strategy for responding to conflicts akin to peacemaking. Transformative justice is concerned with root causes and comprehensive outcomes. It is akin to healing justice more than other alternatives to imprisonment. In this, transformative justice takes the principles and practices of restorative justice beyond the criminal justice system and applies to areas such as environmental law, corporate law, labor-management relations, consumer bankruptcy and debt, and family law.

As in transformative learning, one works from desired future states back to the present steps required to reach them. The issue is not whether the perpetrator may make a choice to do something similar again, but whether the community is willing to support the victim and perpetrator in some form of contact. It is possible for the community to choose to support the perpetrator and not the victim as defined by the law, but if they do so they may be obligated to support some re-definition of "equity" so that law comes back into line with the social concept of equity. For example, it is possible for the community to support imprisonment as a means of isolation but not punishment.

This model for decarceration may have roots in the work of Samuel Tuke and B. F. Skinner but departs by relying on individual volunteers' caring and supporting capacity, not any socially imposed etiquette derived from civilization. Transformative justice theory has been advanced by Ruth Morris and Giselle Dias of the Canadian Quakers.

Anarchist criminology tends to favour holistic transformative justice approaches over restorative justice, which it tends to argue is too beholden to the existing criminal justice system.

== Distinctions between transformative and restorative justice ==
Transformative justice is distinguishable from restorative justice in that transformative justice places emphasis on addressing and repairing harm outside of the state. Adrienne Maree Brown uses the example of a person who has stolen money in order to buy food to sustain themselves, writing that “if the racialized system of capitalism has produced such inequality that someone who is hungry and steals a purse to resource a meal, returning the purse with an apology or community service to does nothing to address that hunger”. Instead, transformative justice requires “the work of addressing harm at the root, outside the mechanisms of the state, so that we can grow into the right relationship with one another”.

Transformative justice is further distinct from restorative justice in that, as many activists and movements stress, the latter is more easily vulnerable to state co-optation. While many of the goals of restorative justice intersect or are compatible with the goals of transformative justice, many restorative justice practices tend to operate within the confines of existing state structures, such as within jails or through community programs involving law enforcement. For example, many restorative justice initiatives take place directly within jails and involve a collaborative relationship with law enforcement or with state sponsored justice systems. As Mimi Kim writes:

“What most of these restorative justice programs share, however, is a collaborative tie to law enforcement, a fact often taken for granted or just as easily overlooked as the promise of restoration rather than retribution distracts attention from the carceral conditions that still bind many of these practices. While pitched as an alternative to the machinery of mass incarceration, restorative justice programs are often initiated from within or in close collaboration with the criminal legal system, leaving its assumptions, its personnel, and its program design within the logic and institutions of the carceral state. In practice, this means that these programs, in large part, leave the selection of cases and, likewise, their potential withdrawal from qualification to prosecutors; failure to meet law enforcement standards may result in sentencing and incarceration; and a number of such programs are carried out entirely within the walls of jails and prisons.”

A stark divide between restorative justice and transformative justice rests on the question of whether or not to engage with the criminal justice system in navigating responses to instances of harms or violence. It is the reliance on or collaboration with formalized or state systems of justice that distinguishes restorative justice approaches from transformative justice ones. Thus, while restorative justice and transformative justice may share similar ideological underpinnings and goals, their set of approaches and tactics can be quite divergent.

In contrast to restorative justice, no quantification or assessment of loss or harms or any assignment of the role of victim is made, and no attempt to compare the past (historical) and future (normative or predicted) conditions is made either. While restorative justice seeks to return the victim to their initial state before the harm occurred, transformative justice is more concerned with questioning whether the conditions in place before the harm are themselves equitable and just, and looks to redress them in order to prevent further harm within the community. The victim is not normally part of the transformative process, but can choose to be. Participants agree only on what constitutes effective harms reduction, which may include separating or isolating perpetrator and victim.

In contrast to equity-restorative justice, there is no social definition of equity imposed on participants. Each is free to decide on some "new normal" state of being for themselves, and is not pressured to agree on it. A victim may continue to seek revenge or desire punishment, e.g. as in retributive justice systems. A perpetrator may lack remorse and may say that they lack remorse.

== Applications ==
=== In post-colonial and post-conflict settings ===
Transformative justice also refers to policy and practice responses to socioeconomic issues in societies transitioning away from conflict or repression. It is closely associated with the scholarship and practice of transitional justice, and refers to "transformative change that emphasises local agency and resources, the prioritisation of process rather than preconceived outcomes, and the challenging of unequal and intersecting power relationships and structures of exclusion at both local and global levels".

=== Climate justice ===
Some climate justice approaches promote transformative justice where advocates focus on how vulnerability to climate change reflects various structural injustices in society, such as the exclusion of marginalized groups from decision-making and from climate resilient livelihoods, and that climate action must explicitly address these structural power imbalances. For these advocates, climate change provides an opportunity to reinforce democratic governance at all scales, and drive the achievement of gender equality and social inclusion. At a minimum, priority is placed on ensuring that responses to climate change do not repeat or reinforce existing injustices, which has both distributive justice and procedural justice dimensions. Other conceptions frame climate justice in terms of the need to curb climate change within certain limits, like the Paris Climate Agreement targets of 1.5C, otherwise the impacts of climate change on natural ecosystems will be so severe as to preclude the possibility of justice for many populations.

=== Sexual violence and harm ===
Transformative justice aims to recognize and sit with the needs and desires of victim-survivors of sexual violence in seeking justice. Acknowledging the interconnectedness of individual and social justice, advocates of transformative justice hold that experiences of intimate partner violence and sexual violence are linked to the broader ways that factors such as race, class, gender, sexuality, ability, migrant and legal status, and beyond manifest as hierarchies of power and oppression. Recognizing that the state and formal criminal justice system often uphold these hierarchies, transformative justice responses to sexual violence often seek resolutions within community or civil society-based groups.

As stated by the generation FIVE coalition, a response to sexual violence as grounded in transformative justice must promote:

1. Survivor safety, healing and agency

2. Offender accountability and transformation

3. Community response and accountability

4. Transformation of the community and social conditions that create and perpetuate sexual violence, i.e. systems of oppression, exploitation, domination, and State violence.

While transformative justice seeks to compassionately put the experiences of those harmed by sexual violence in conversation with the way that communities are both sites and sources of similar violence, feminist critiques of restorative justice also extend to transformative justice. Noting in particular how some victim-survivors may desire a retributive and carceral “solution”, Annalise Acorn provides important complexity to alternative modes of justice that calls on transformative justice practitioners to be attentive to the intimate and profound harm of sexual violence.

== See also ==
- Nonviolence
- Prison abolition movement
- Psychiatric imprisonment
- Punitive damages
- Restorative justice
- Retributive justice
- Transformative learning
