= Gina Dent =

American feminist scholar

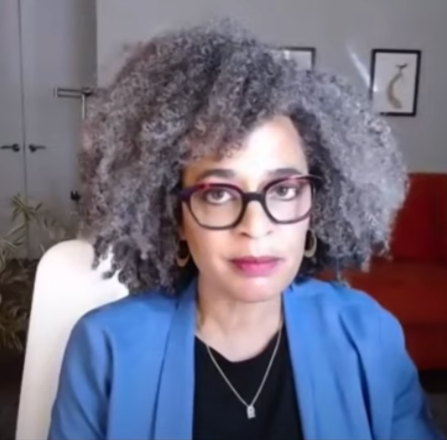
- Born: 1966 (age 59–60)
- Education: UC Berkeley; Columbia University
- Occupation: Academic
- Employer: UC Santa Cruz
- Partner: Angela Y. Davis

Gina Dent (born 1966) is an American professor of Humanities and faculty director of the Institute of the Arts & Sciences at UC Santa Cruz. She co-authored the 2022 book Abolition. Feminism. Now. with her partner, Angela Davis; Erica Meiners; and Beth Richie.

== Education ==
Dent received her B.A. in Comparative Literature from the University of California, Berkeley, and her M.A. and Ph.D. in English & Comparative Literature from Columbia University.

== Career ==
As of 2026, Dent is a professor of humanities and faculty director of the Institute of the Arts & Sciences at the University of California, Santa Cruz. In 2019, she received a Dizikes Award for teaching.

Her research interests include Africana studies, legal theory, and popular culture. She is the editor of Black Popular Culture (1992). This collection was named a Village Voice Best Book of the Year. In 2011, Dent served in a delegation to Palestine, and she advocates for human rights in the region. She is sought-after internationally as a speaker and educator on Black Feminism and abolitionism.

She has two forthcoming books, Prison as a Border and Other Essays and Anchored to the Real: Black Literature in the Wake of Anthropology, which will be published by Duke University Press. Dent co-authored the 2022 book Abolition. Feminism. Now. with Angela Davis, Erica Meiners, and Beth Richie, which argues for a prison abolitionist vision of feminism.

== Personal life ==
As of 2020, Dent was living with her partner, feminist scholar and activist Angela Y. Davis. Together, they have advocated for the abolition of police and prisons, using the concept of abolition feminism.

== Bibliography ==
- Editor, Black Popular Culture. Seattle: Bay Press, 1992; New York: New Press, 1999. ISBN 9780941920247
- "Michael Joo", in Elaine Kim and Margo Machida, eds., Fresh Talk/Daring Gazes: Asian American Issues in the Contemporary Visual Arts. Berkeley: University of California Press. 2003
- Co-author with mentor Angela Y. Davis, "Prison as a Border: A Conversation on Gender, Globalization and Punishment", Signs: Journal of Women in Culture & Society, Vol. 26, No. 4; Summer 2001.
- "A New York Story", catalogue essay for the exhibition Inclusion/Exclusion. Graz, Austria. 1997.
- Jack Salzman, David Lionel Smith, and Cornel West (eds), "Rita Dove" and "Jamaica Kincaid" (literary biographies) in Encyclopedia of African American Culture and History, New York: Macmillan Library Reference. 1996.
- "Missionary Position" in Rebecca Walker (ed.), To Be Real: Telling the Truth and Changing the Face of Feminism. New York: Anchor/Doubleday. 1995.
- "Race and Racism: A Symposium", Social Text. Vol. 42. Spring, 1995
- Davis, Angela Y. (2022). Abolition. Feminism. Now. Gina Dent, Erica R. Meiners, Beth Richie. Chicago, Illinois. ISBN 978-1-64259-396-9. OCLC 1144102232.
