= Beth Richie =

American academic

Beth E. Richie is an American professor of African American Studies, Sociology, Gender and Women's Studies, and Criminology, Law, and Justice at the University of Illinois at Chicago (UIC) where she currently serves as head of the Criminology, Law, and Justice Department. From 2010 to 2016, Richie served as the director of the UIC Institute of Research on Race and Public Policy. In 2014, she was named a senior adviser to the National Football League Players Association Commission on domestic violence and sexual assault.

Richie is a longtime anti-violence advocate and activist who is a founding member of INCITE! Women, Gender Non-Conforming, and Trans people of Color Against Violence.

== Area of interest ==
Richie stands for the expression of women's freedom from violence and an advocate for aggression. She explains that gender violence is a main cause of women's oppression, which had many successes under the reforms that protects the rights of women who were survivors of sexual abuse and victimized sexual harassment. Her social position in her work came from incarceration and women's experiences in violence. Richie widely researches and analyzes the victims behind gender violence. She finds the importance of reconciliation for women who are constantly dealing with violence. Richie is a prison abolitionist.

== Education and achievements ==
Richie grew up in Shaker Heights, Ohio, graduating from Shaker Heights High School in 1975. Richie earned a bachelor's degree in Social Work from Cornell University in 1979, a Master of Social Work from George Warren Brown School of Social Work at Washington University in St. Louis in 1980, and a Ph.D. in Sociology with a Certificate in Women's Studies from CUNY Graduate Center in 1992. Richie has written Compelled to Crime: the Gender Entrapment of Black Battered Women, which was based on the controversy of crime, race, and gender. She was also the author of Arrested Justice: Black Women, Violence and America's Prison Nation. This book focuses on the mass incarceration during the anti-violence shift of black women in the United States that involved gender violence and criminal justice policies.

== Research ==
Richie then creates groups that are like rehabilitation for women to overcome their past experiences of violence and aggression. Richie was an advocate for anti-violence and studied criminology, law, and also was a justice scholar. She gathered documented stories of women that had faced unjust legalities, to remove the anti-violence struggles and also to consider the factors that later were drawn to advocacy and reform. She had identified that within revealing how it learns the focus on “neutral gender”, the powers that result in intimate partner violence, and attendant remedies have impacted the black communities in the same structure that they reject to analyze the violence that women may experience in the powers of another individual, such as economic exploitation and heterosexism.

== Citations ==
- Kaufman, Nicole (2013). "Beth E. Richie, Arrest Justice: Black Women, Violence, and America's Prison Nation". Punishment & Society. 15 (3): 330–332. doi:10.1177/1462474513476226. S2CID 146953558.
- Richie, Beth E. "Who’s Who Among African Americans" Detroit, Michigan: Gale Cengage Learning, 2007.
- Richie, Beth E (2000). "A Black Feminist Reflection on the Antiviolence Movement". Signs: Journal of Women in Culture and Society. 25 (4): 1133–1137. doi:10.1086/495533. JSTOR 3175500. S2CID 144905175.
- Riche, Beth E.; Freudenburg, Nicholas; Page, Joanne (2001). "Reintegrating Women Leaving Jail into Urban Communities: A Description of a Model Program". Journal of Urban Health. 78 (2): 1–2. doi:10.1093/jurban/78.2.290. PMC 3456359. PMID 11419582.

== Life ==
Her interests include feminist theories, sociology of race and ethnicity, criminology, and violence against women. Dr. Richie has conducted several sociological studies at Rikers Island Correctional Facility on incarcerated women, and her book Compelled to Crime: The Gender Entrapment of Battered Black Women is widely used in college courses. Dr. Richie is also currently researching several projects investigating connections between violence against women and violence proliferated by women, especially in poor African American communities. She is on the steering committee of the Institute on Domestic Violence in the African American Community.

== Publications ==
- Beverly Guy-Sheftall, ed. (1995). "Battered black women: A challenge for the black community". Words of Fire: An Anthology of African-American Feminist Thought. The New Press. ISBN 9781565842564.; originally Black Scholar, (1985)
- Barbara Bair; Susan E. Cayleff, eds. (1993). "Battered Women of Color in Public Health Care Systems". Wings of Gauze: Women of Color and the Experience of Health and Illness. Wayne State University Press. ISBN 9780814323021.
- Compelled to Crime: The Gender Entrapment of Battered Black Women. Psychology Press. 1996. ISBN 9780415911450.
- Richie, B. E.; Johnsen, C. (1996). "Abuse histories among newly incarcerated women in a New York City jail". Journal of the American Medical Women's Association. 51 (3): 111–117. PMID 8683020.
- "Reintegrating women leaving jail into urban communities: A description of a model program," (2001)
- Freudenberg, N.; Daniels, J.; Crum, M.; Perkins, T.; Richie, B. E. (2008). "Coming Home From Jail: The Social and Health Consequences of Community Reentry for Women, Male Adolescents, and Their Families and Communities". American Journal of Public Health. 95 (10): 1725–36. doi:10.2105/ajph.2004.056325. PMC 2518598. PMID 18687613.
- Arrested Justice: Black Women, Violence, and America's Prison Nation. NYU Press. 2012. ISBN 9780814708224.
- Davis, Angela; Dent, Gina; Meiners, Erica; Ritchie, Beth (2022). Abolition. Feminism. Now. Haymarket Books. ISBN 9781642592580.
