= Incite! =

U.S. anti-violence activist organization of women of color

INCITE! Women, Gender Non-Conforming, and Trans People of Color Against Violence, formerly known as INCITE! Women of Color Against Violence, is a United States–based national activist organization of radical feminists of color advancing a movement to end violence against women of color and their communities. INCITE! is organized by a national collective of women of color and has active chapters and affiliates in San Francisco, Washington, D.C., Denver, Albuquerque, Austin, New Orleans, Boston, Philadelphia, New York City, Ann Arbor, Binghamton, Chicago, and a chapter in Toronto, Ontario, Canada. INCITE! was founded in 2000.

== History ==
INCITE! began in 2000 after organizing the conference, "The Color of Violence: Violence Against Women of Color", held at the University of California-Santa Cruz on April 28–29, 2000. Prior to The Color of Violence, many women of color felt their needs had been ignored in the violence against women movement. Much of the leadership in the movement that was started by Black lesbians at that time was white women who typically excluded an intersectional approach. Women of color had a more radical approach to the violence against women movement. That approach was often ignored. Many of the women of color grew frustrated and left the movement entirely. The Color of Violence Convention gave women of color a place where their more radical approach could be central, and its founders included Val Kalei Kanuha. Issues addressed at this conference included immigrant rights and Indian treaty rights, the proliferation of prisons, militarism, attacks on the reproductive rights of women of color, medical experimentation on communities of color, homophobia and heterosexism, economic neo-colonialism, and the politicization of the movement against domestic and sexual violence. Conference organizers initially anticipated a small gathering of one to two hundred people. Still, over one thousand people attended and over two thousand people had to be turned away because of space limitations." Andrea Smith, a white woman, and INCITE! co-founder, wrote that "the overwhelming response to this initial effort suggests that women of color and their allies are hungry for a new approach toward ending violence." As a result of this enthusiastic response, conference organizers and others founded INCITE! to continue to implement the ideas of the conference.

== Analysis ==
INCITE! identifies "violence against women of color" as a combination of "violence directed at communities", such as police violence, war, and colonialism, and "violence within communities", such as rape and domestic violence. INCITE! critiques the battered women's movement and anti-rape movement as becoming increasingly professionalized, keeping it from taking more political stances on institutional oppression and violence, and increasingly collaborative with the criminal justice system, which they identify as being "brutally oppressive towards communities of color". INCITE! also critiques racial justice organizing that focuses on racism only as it affects men of color. As an alternative strategy, INCITE! develops strategies to address both personal and state violence, acknowledging the ways that oppressions intersect in the lives of women of color. At INCITE!'s first conference, "The Color of Violence", in 2000, speaker Angela Davis described this intersectional approach to violence against women of color in the following way:

We need an analysis that furthers neither the conservative project of sequestering millions of men of color in accordance with the contemporary dictates of globalized capital and its prison industrial complex, nor the equally conservative project of abandoning poor women of color to a continuum of violence that extends from the sweatshops through the prisons, to shelters, and into bedrooms at home. How do we develop analyses and organizing strategies against violence against women that acknowledge the race of gender and the gender of race?

== Projects ==
INCITE! works on several local and national campaigns including organizing against police violence against women and trans people of color, for community-based strategies to hold people engaged in abusive behavior such as domestic and sexual violence accountable, against sterilization abuse and the Hyde Amendment, and against the War on Iraq and U.S. militarism. INCITE! helped to establish the Boarding School Healing Project, a project that organizes Native Americans to hold the U.S. government accountable for forcing over 100,000 Native children to go to Christian boarding schools where they were often raped and abused. In 2004, INCITE! launched SisterFire, a national tour of women of color artists using creative cultural methods to engage other women of color on a number of issues, including war, reproductive violence, and immigrant rights.

INCITE!'s grassroots chapters also organize projects to address multiple kinds of violence against women of color. After Hurricane Katrina, INCITE!'s New Orleans chapter began a women's health clinic to support low-income and uninsured women of color to meet their healthcare needs and to organize for racial, gender, economic, and environmental justice. INCITE!'s Philadelphia chapter has worked on issues of housing and gentrification. INCITE!'s affiliate, Sista II Sista, organized campaigns against sexual harassment of young women of color by police officers in Brooklyn, NY. INCITE!'s Denver chapter spotlighted an intersectional analysis of racism and violence against women as a critique to other anti-violence organizations' responses to the Kobe Bryant sexual assault case. INCITE!'s chapter in Washington, D.C. organized direct actions against street harassment.

INCITE! also organized two other national Color of Violence conferences: "The Color of Violence II: Building A Movement" in Chicago, Illinois, in March 2002, and "The Color of Violence III: Stopping The War On Women of Color" in New Orleans, Louisiana, in March 2005. INCITE! also helped to organize a national conference in April 2004 entitled, "The Revolution Will Not Be Funded: Beyond The Non-Profit Industrial Complex" at the University of California-Santa Barbara. This latter conference brought together activists to investigate the impact of the non-profit system on grassroots movement building.

In 2006, INCITE! published an anthology of writings that reflect their politics entitled, Color of Violence: The INCITE! Anthology, published by South End Press. In 2007, they also published an anthology entitled, The Revolution Will Not Be Funded: Beyond The Non-Profit Industrial Complex, published by South End Press. The Revolution Will Not Be Funded was awarded the Gustavus Myers 2007 Outstanding Book Award.
