= Prison abolition =

Political movement

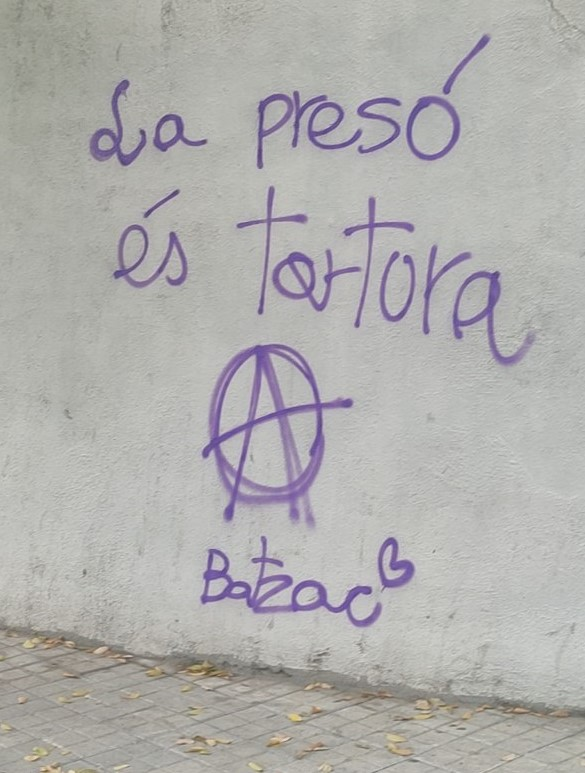
"Prison is torture" graffiti with the Anarchist Circle-A symbol in Catalonia

Prison abolition is a movement that seeks to abolish prisons as an institution. Unlike prison reform, prison abolition aims to establish a criminal justice system that avoids the use of detention entirely. Supporters commonly advocate for a restorative justice approach that aims to rehabilitate criminals, as opposed to retributive justice, which aims to punish the criminal in proportion to the crime.

Prison abolitionists often advocate major structural changes to prevent crime at the societal level by addressing its root causes. According to this view, crime is a consequence of societal issues such as racism and poverty.

The prison abolition movement in the United States formed in part as a response to the 1971 Attica Prison riot, which drew attention to the inhumane conditions common in prisons. High-profile activists, most notably Angela Davis, brought the issue of prison abolition to some attention, though it has been largely restricted to left-wing, academic circles. Interest surged following the 2020 murder of George Floyd and the civil unrest that followed, which highlighted racial disparities in the criminal justice system.

== Arguments ==
Instead of viewing the violence, discrimination, and other harms caused by prisons as an aberration, abolitionists believe that these factors are inherent in the system itself and cannot be fixed with reforms. Based on new evidence, several abolitionists have argued that "much of what reformists claim is wrong with the criminal punishment system—such as high rates of recidivism, severe racial disparities, and extreme obstacles to reintegration—is in fact intrinsic to the logic of how it is intended to work and that it is inherently and purposively stacked against the interests of the poor, minorities, and marginalized groups". Arguments in favor of prison abolition include its high financial cost, impact on families, and the suffering inflicted on prisoners.

Activists Ruth Wilson Gilmore and James Kilgore explain that their abolitionist convictions are derived from years of working in and observing prisons. Abolitionists challenge all of the conventional justifications for imprisonment, citing lack of evidence for the effect of prison on incapacitating, deterring, or rehabilitating offenders; as well as for improving public safety and reducing crime. They argue that the harms from crime can be addressed in other ways, ranging from wide-ranging societal reform to eliminate many of the causes of crime, to restorative justice. Prison abolition is often described as utopian, both in a positive and negative sense.

Although reforms have targeted conditions of imprisonment on human rights grounds, as well as some penal practices such as life imprisonment without the prospect of parole, arbitrary detention, and pretrial detention, imprisonment itself and the length of sentences has largely escaped scrutiny on human rights grounds. This is despite similar evidence for the harms of imprisonment compared to recognized forms of cruel, inhuman or degrading treatment and torture. The lack of attention to prison as a human rights problem has been criticized by some scholars, citing its disproportionate impact on poor and marginalized people.

=== Opposition ===
Critics of abolition describe it as "naïve idealism" due to the lack "of any practical alternatives to prison", or feel it diverts attention away from reform efforts that have a greater chance of success. Thomas Ward Frampton cites the most common argument against abolitionism as what to do with the small number of prisoners who present the most danger to society; abolitionists do not have a unified answer to this problem.

Some people and organizations support decarceration while opposing abolitionism, contending that reforms could reduce the prison population by half or up to 90 percent with no impact on public safety. Others argue that most dangerous offenders are not prevented from committing crimes despite mass incarceration, citing low crime clearance rates, disagreement about which actions are most harmful to society, and the number of violent crimes committed by prisoners against each other.

== History ==
Imprisonment as punishment for a crime has not changed radically in hundreds of years, so some people argue it needs to be rethought in the 21st century. Despite enjoying a small following in academic circles for several decades, prison abolition was never a mainstream position before the 21st century.

In the 1970s, the prison abolition movement was more popular in Europe compared to police abolition. Prison abolition also was somewhat popular in the United States at the same time, with some experts at the time viewing the eventual abolition of prison as inevitable.

== Notable prison abolitionists ==
- Adrienne maree brown, American writer
- Darializa Avila Chevalier, American politician and community organizer
- Patrisse Cullors, American activist and co-founder of Black Lives Matter
- Angela Davis, American activist
- Johanna Fernández, American historian
- Maxwell Frost, US Representative
- Ruth Wilson Gilmore, American intellectual
- Mariame Kaba, American activist
- Colin Kaepernick, American activist and football player
- Fay Honey Knopp, American Quaker minister
- Kate Nevens, Member of the Scottish Parliament
- Howard Zinn, American historian and philosopher

== See also ==
- Abolition feminism
