= Felicia Rose Chavez =

American writer and educator

- Education: University of Iowa, MFA
- Occupations: Writer; educator
- Writing career
- Language: English
- Notable works: The Anti-Racist Writing Workshop

Felicia Rose Chavez is an American writer and educator. She is the author of The Anti-Racist Writing Workshop: How to Decolonize the Creative Classroom (Haymarket Books, 2021) and a co-editor of The BreakBeat Poets Vol. 4: LatiNEXT (2020).

== Career ==
Chavez received an MFA in creative nonfiction from the University of Iowa. She served as program director of Young Chicago Authors, founded GirlSpeak, and later taught writing at the University of New Mexico, the University of Iowa, and Colorado College. In 2020, Colorado College named Chavez its first Bronfman Creativity & Innovation Scholar-in-Residence.

== Publications and reception ==
In 2020, Chavez co-edited The BreakBeat Poets Vol. 4: LatiNEXT with José Olivarez and Willie Perdomo. In a review for Newcity, Darshita Jain wrote that the anthology "works across cultures and boundaries and normalizes thinking in multiple languages". In the American Studies Journal, Ignacio Carvajal wrote that the anthology highlighted poetics that had been excluded and centered the works as subjects of literary study and merit. The anthology was also reviewed in Autostraddle.

Her book The Anti-Racist Writing Workshop: How to Decolonize the Creative Classroom was published in 2021. Coverage described the book as combining memoir and teaching guide. The book was reviewed in Composition Studies, Journal of Creative Writing Studies, Third Coast Review, and Phoebe. It was also discussed in Literary Hub.

== Works ==
- The BreakBeat Poets Vol. 4: LatiNEXT (co-editor, with José Olivarez and Willie Perdomo; 2020)
- The Anti-Racist Writing Workshop: How to Decolonize the Creative Classroom (2021)
