= Louder than Bombs =

Louder than Bombs may refer to:

- Louder Than Bombs, an album by the Smiths
- Louder Than Bombs (film), a 2015 internationally co-produced drama film directed by Joachim Trier
- Louder Than Bombs, a rock/punk group from Rhode Island

== See also ==
- Louder Than a Bomb, an annual poetry slam held in Chicago since 2001
  - Louder Than a Bomb (film), a 2010 documentary about the poetry slam
