= José Olivarez =

American poet and educator

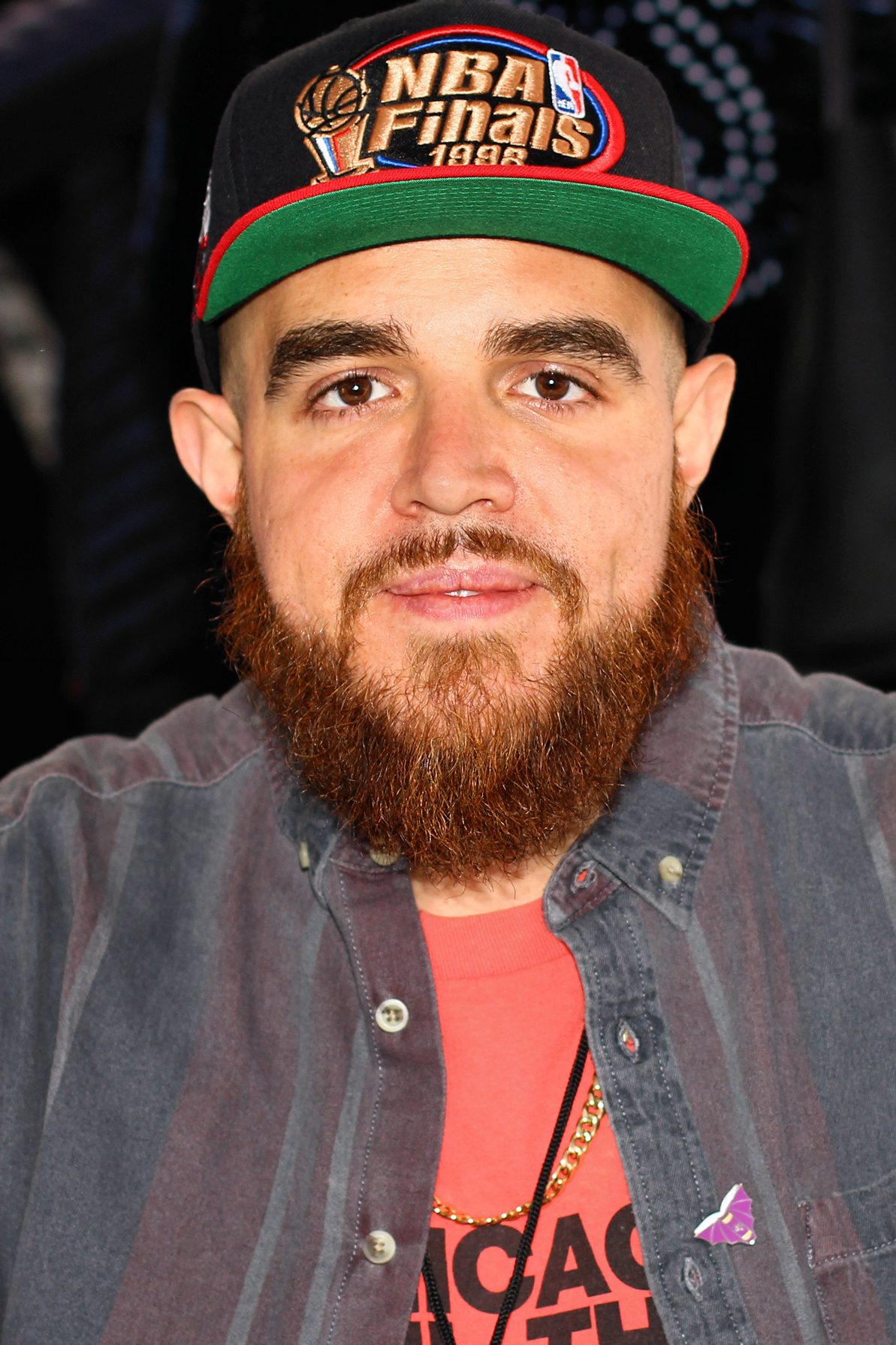
- Olivarez at the 2019 Texas Book Festival
- Born: Calumet City, Illinois, U.S.
- Education: Harvard University (BA)
- Occupations: Poet; educator
- Writing career
- Language: English
- Genre: Poetry
- Notable works: Citizen Illegal; Promises of Gold

José Olivarez is an American poet and educator from Calumet City, Illinois. He is the author of the poetry collections Citizen Illegal (2018), which won the 2018 Chicago Review of Books Poetry Prize and was a finalist for the 2019 PEN/Jean Stein Book Award, and Promises of Gold (2023), which was longlisted for the 2023 National Book Award for Poetry.

== Early life and education ==
Olivarez is the son of Mexican immigrants and was born and raised in Calumet City, Illinois. He earned a BA from Harvard University.

== Career ==
Olivarez was involved with Young Chicago Authors and Urban Word NYC before the publication of his first full-length collection. He was also a co-author of Home Court (2014) and co-host of the poetry podcast The Poetry Gods.

His debut poetry collection, Citizen Illegal, was published by Haymarket Books in 2018. Harvard Magazine described the collection as addressing race, migration, language, and the contradictions of the first-generation immigrant experience. Publishers Weekly reviewed the book as a collection centered on family and Mexican American identity. The book won the 2018 Chicago Review of Books Poetry Prize and was a finalist for the 2019 PEN/Jean Stein Book Award.

His second collection, Promises of Gold, was published by Henry Holt and Company in 2023 with a Spanish translation by David Ruano. The book was longlisted for the 2023 National Book Award for Poetry. Publishers Weekly reviewed the collection as addressing Mexican identity, friendship, romantic love, food, and loss. In a review for the Poetry Foundation, Diego Báez wrote that the poems explore desire and fulfillment through relationships with countries, cultures, lovers, friends, and family, and noted the collection's use of Spanish translation.

Olivarez co-edited The BreakBeat Poets Vol. 4: LatiNEXT with Felicia Rose Chavez and Willie Perdomo. His writing has appeared in The New York Times, The Paris Review, and Poetry.

== Works ==
- Home Court, with Ben Alfaro (2014)
- Citizen Illegal (Haymarket Books, 2018)
- The BreakBeat Poets Vol. 4: LatiNEXT, co-edited with Felicia Rose Chavez and Willie Perdomo (Haymarket Books, 2020)
- Promises of Gold (Henry Holt and Company, 2023)
- Por Siempre, with Antonio Salazar (Haymarket Books, 2023)

== Awards and honors ==
- 2018 Chicago Review of Books Poetry Prize, winner, for Citizen Illegal
- 2019 PEN/Jean Stein Book Award, finalist, for Citizen Illegal
- 2019 Ruth Lilly and Dorothy Sargent Rosenberg Poetry Fellowship
- 2023 National Book Award for Poetry, longlist, for Promises of Gold
