= 2016 Donald Trump Chicago rally protest =

- Part of the protests against Donald Trump
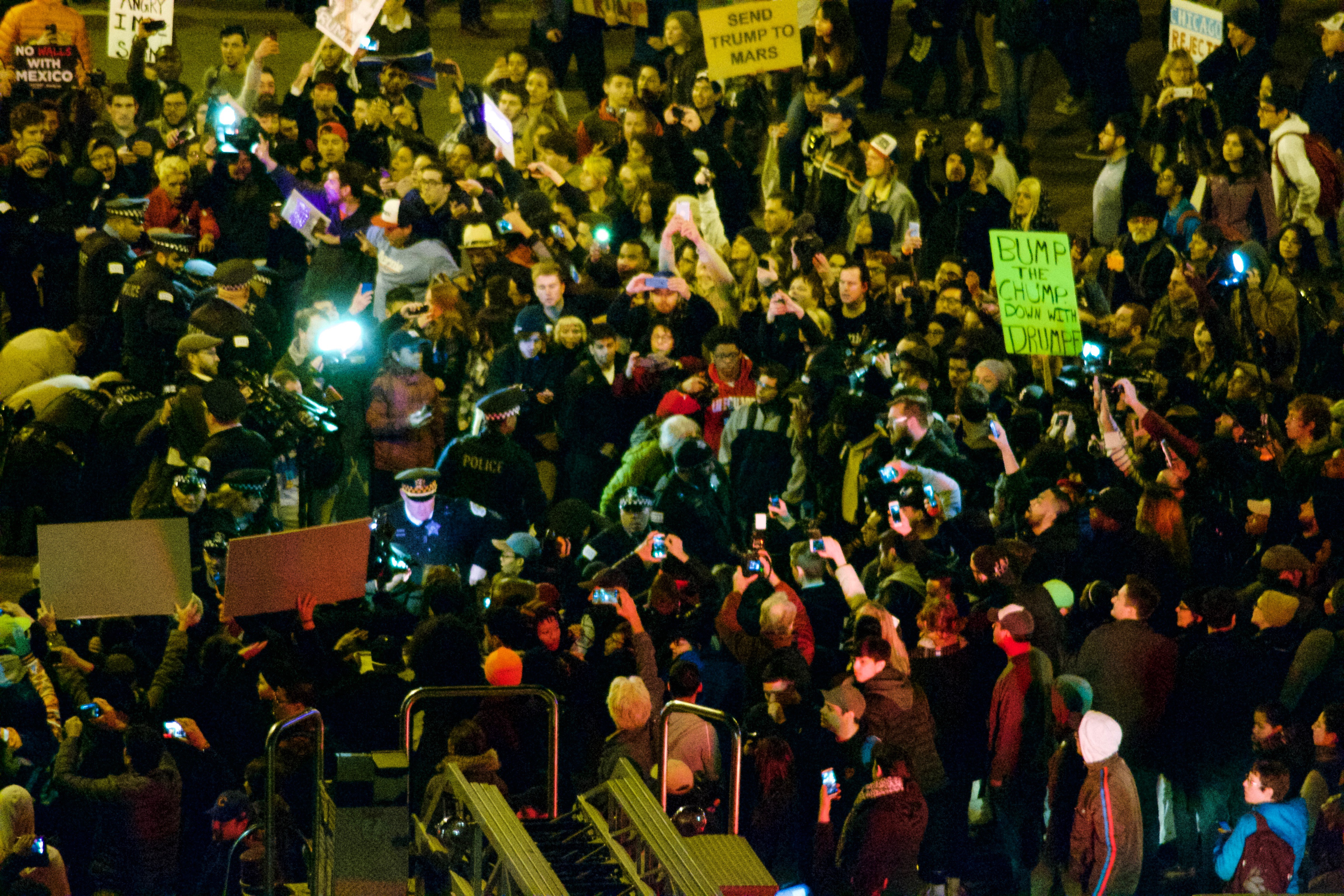
- Date: March 11, 2016
- Location: UIC Pavilion, Chicago, Illinois; 41°52′29″N 87°39′22″W
- Caused by: Donald Trump visit
- Methods: Demonstration; Assault
- Result: Donald Trump rally canceled

Parties
Anti-Trump protesters	Chicago Police Department	Donald Trump supporters

Number
2,500+		6,000

Casualties
- Injuries: 4+
- Arrested: 5 (including a CBS News reporter)

On March 11, 2016, the Donald Trump presidential campaign canceled a planned rally at the University of Illinois Chicago (UIC), in Chicago, Illinois, citing "growing safety concerns" due to the presence of thousands of protesters inside and outside his rally.

Thousands of anti-Trump demonstrators responding to civic leaders' and social media calls to shut the rally down had gathered outside the arena, and several hundred more filled seating areas within the UIC Pavilion, where the rally was to take place. When the Trump campaign announced that the rally would not take place, there was a great deal of shouting and a few small scuffles between Trump supporters and anti-Trump protesters.

== Prelude ==
Plans to protest the Trump rally were launched a week in advance by a variety of community and student groups who largely organized via social media. Some 43,000 undergraduate and graduate students had signed a petition asking UIC to cancel the rally by March 6. That same day, Latino leaders in the city, led by Democratic U.S. Representative Luis Gutierrez of Chicago, issued a call to their constituents to join them in a protest outside the UIC Pavilion, where the rally was to take place. One of many student-based protests was first proposed by 20-year-old Chicago political activist and Bernie Sanders supporter Ja'Mal Green, who had posted to Facebook a week urging others to "get your tickets to this. We're all going in!!!! #SHUTITDOWN." Green told reporters that the plan was for protestors to make noise when Trump appeared, "and then rush the stage." While "activist groups did try to disrupt the event, ... many protesters said that they learned of the demonstrations on social media and went of their own accord."

MoveOn.org confirmed that it helped promote the protest and paid for printing protest signs and a banner. Among those who took part in organizing the protest included members of the UIC faculty, People for Bernie, the Fearless Undocumented Alliance, Black Lives Matter, Assata's Daughters, BYP100, College Students for Bernie, and Showing Up for Racial Justice, with "black, Latino and Muslim young people" at the "core" of the crowds of protesters. Sanders himself did not acknowledge these protests in advance, instead hosting his own rally that night in nearby Summit, Illinois.

== Incident ==
Protesters outside the rally chant "Shut it down"

Video of Trump rally at UIC Pavilion in Chicago on March 11, 2016, immediately after news of Trump's cancellation of attendance of the event. Many protesters cheer "Bernie!" to show their support for Democratic candidate Bernie Sanders.

Voice of America video of the clashes at the UIC Pavilion

The protests had begun 24 hours prior to the event with a vigil outside UIC Pavilion. The vigil lasted until the rally was scheduled to begin.

Thirty minutes after the rally was scheduled to begin, a representative of the Trump campaign came on stage and announced that the rally was postponed. The crowd immediately cheered and chanted "We dumped Trump!" and "We shut it down!" As Trump supporters shouted "We want Trump!", arguments, several fistfights, and small scuffles broke out between the groups. Two police officers and at least two civilians were injured during the protests. Five people were arrested, including Sopan Deb, a CBS News reporter who was covering Trump's campaign. Protesters said that they were protesting against racism and Trump's policies. Some of the demonstrators were also members of the group Black Lives Matter. A smaller number of protesters were seen carrying flags representing various groups and countries, including Mexico.

John Escalante, the interim superintendent of the Chicago Police Department (CPD), said about 300 officers were on hand for crowd control. A CPD spokesman said the department had never told the Trump campaign that there was a security threat, and added that the department had sufficient manpower on the scene to handle any situation.

The Trump campaign postponed the rally. The CPD and other law-enforcement authorities "were not consulted and had no role in canceling the event." Trump initially claimed he had conferred with Chicago Police but later said that he made the decision himself: "I didn't want to see people get hurt [so] I decided to postpone the rally."

=== Arrests ===
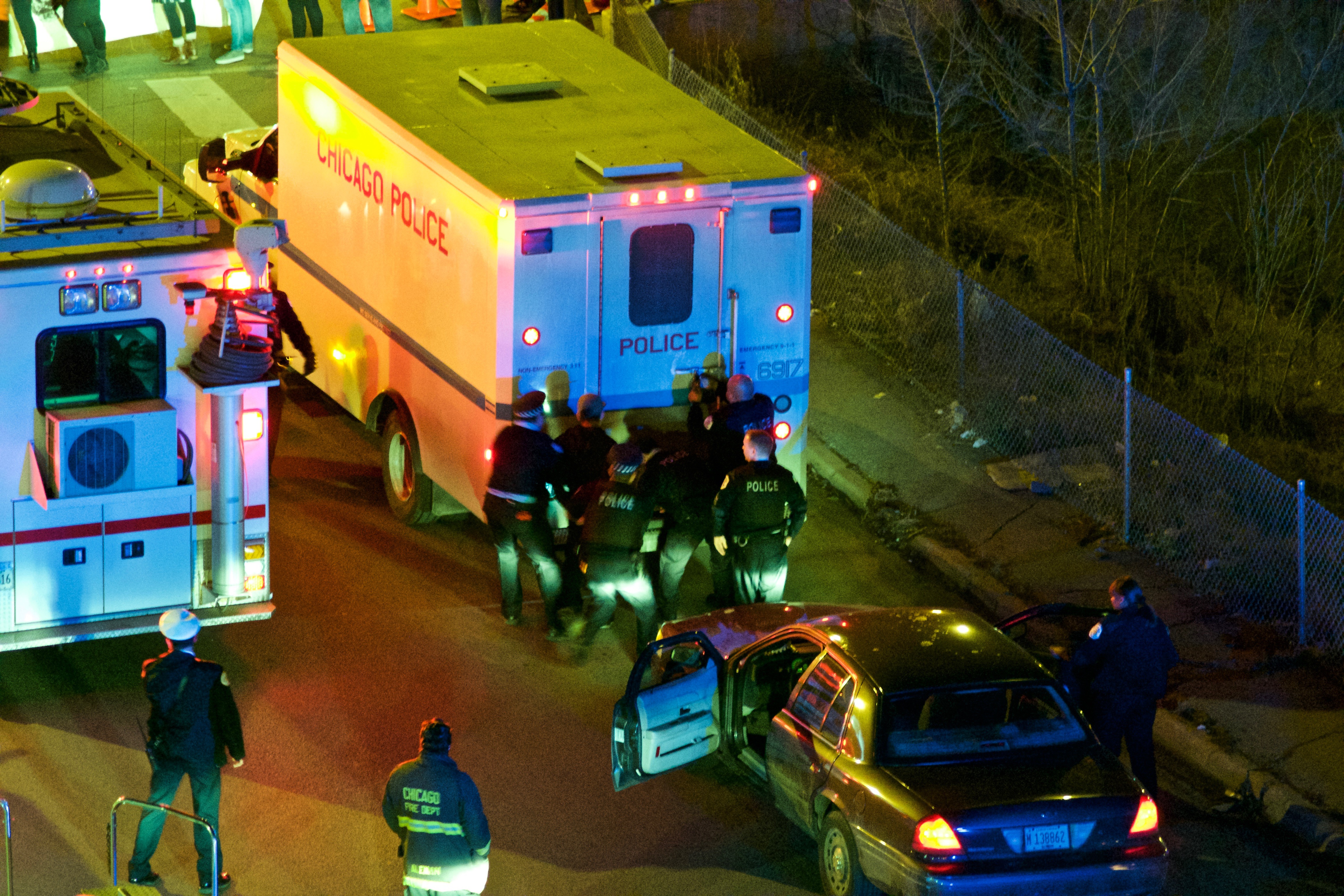
Arrest being made at the protest

Four individuals were arrested and charged in the incident. Two were "charged with felony aggravated battery to a police officer and resisting arrest", one was "charged with two misdemeanor counts of resisting and obstructing a peace officer", and the fourth "was charged with one misdemeanor count of resisting and obstructing a peace officer". Sopan Deb, a CBS reporter covering the Trump campaign, was one of those arrested outside the rally. He was charged with resisting arrest; Chicago police ultimately dropped the charges.

== Reactions and aftermath ==
Voice of America video about Trump and Sanders' responses to the postponed Chicago rally

Protesters celebrate event cancellation outside of event

Attendees exit Harrison Street east after rally was canceled. Video from eyewitness protester.

After the event was postponed, Green described the cancellation of the event as a "win," saying that "our whole purpose was to shut it down... we had to show him that our voice in civil rights was greater than his voice. The minority became the majority today." Mayor Rahm Emanuel praised the Chicago Police Department's work to restore order.

Trump blamed Sanders for the clashes in Chicago, insisting that the protesters were "Bernie's crowd" and that a protester who charged the stage at an event in Dayton, Ohio, the following day was a "Bernie person", calling on Sanders to "get your people in line". Sanders subsequently denounced Trump as a "pathological liar" who leads a "vicious movement", and said that "while I appreciate that we had supporters at Trump's rally in Chicago, our campaign did not organize the protests." Sanders blamed Trump for propagating "birther" conspiracy theories and for promoting "hatred and division against Latinos, Muslims, women and people with disabilities".

=== Presidential candidates ===
==== Republican ====
Rivals for the Republican presidential nomination criticized Trump. Senator Ted Cruz of Texas said, "When you have a campaign that affirmatively encourages violence, you create an environment that only encourages that sort of nasty discourse." John Kasich, Governor of Ohio, issued a statement saying, "Tonight, the seeds of division that Donald Trump has been sowing this whole campaign finally bore fruit, and it was ugly." Senator Marco Rubio of Florida attributed blame for the events at various parties, including the protesters, the media, and the Democratic Party, but "reserved his harshest words" for Trump, condemning him for inciting supporters who have punched and beaten demonstrators and likening him to "Third World strongmen".

==== Democratic ====
Clinton, one of two Democratic presidential candidates in the 2016 election, said in a statement that the Trump campaign's "divisive rhetoric" was of "grave concern" and said, "We all have our differences, and we know many people across the country feel angry. We need to address that anger together." The morning after the incident, Clinton said, "The ugly, divisive rhetoric we are hearing from Donald Trump and the encouragement of violence and aggression is wrong, and it's dangerous. If you play with matches, you're going to start a fire you can't control. That's not leadership. That's political arson." Bernie Sanders, the other Democratic candidate, tweeted: "We will continue to bring people together. We will not allow the Donald Trumps of the world to divide us up."

=== Media ===
Conservative media described protest actions as an infringement on Trump's freedom of speech. National Review editor Rich Lowry called the protest an indefensible "mob action" and wrote that "the spectacle ... will probably only help" Trump, since he "thrives on polarization and has sought to turn up the temperature of his rallies with his notorious suggestions that protesters should get roughed up." Fox News host Jeanine Pirro characterized the protesters as "abject anarchists" who had infringed upon Trump's right to free speech by "responding to activist calls at No. SHUTITDOWN."

Other media outlets stated that such protest actions were predictable due to Trump's rhetoric. Rachel Maddow of MSNBC said that Trump's violent rhetoric at campaign rallies resulted in the escalation of tensions: "Anybody who tells you that there is no connection between the behavior of the mob at these events and the behavior of the man at the podium leading the mob at these events is not actually watching what he's been saying from the podium." Jelani Cobb wrote in The New Yorker that "the image of protesters clashing with Trump supporters in Chicago ... is the logical culmination of what we've seen throughout his Presidential campaign" as "the idea of fighting to take the country back" promoted by Trump's campaign "went from figurative to literal".

== See also ==
- January 6 United States Capitol attack
- 1968 Democratic National Convention protest activity
- List of incidents of civil unrest in the United States
- United States presidential election in Illinois, 2016
- 2008 financial crisis
