= Young Chicago Authors =

Non-profit organization

- Formation: 1991
- Founder: Robert Boone
- Founded at: Chicago, Illinois
- Type: Nonprofit
- Purpose: Promotion of young writers and performers
- Location: Chicago, United States
- Official language: English
- Website: youngchicagoauthors.org

Young Chicago Authors is a non-profit organization that promotes young writers and performers in the greater Chicagoland area. They are known for their Rooted & Radical (R&R) youth poetry festival which was previously called Louder Than a Bomb (LTAB). Famous past participants include Chance the Rapper, Nate Marshall, Kevin Coval, Eve Ewing, Noname, and Jamila Woods.

The organization repeatedly made headlines between 2013 and 2021 for allegations of serial sexual assault and systemic coverups. In 2021 the president and founder of Button Poetry, Sam Van Cook, stated that the leadership at Young Chicago Authors (YCA) was "a clear and present danger to the thousands of young people served through YCA and [the slam poetry tournament] Louder Than a Bomb (LTAB)”, YCA's leadership turned over and Chicago Public Schools suspended its partnership with YCA due to the allegations of serial sexual abuse.

== History ==
Young Chicago Authors was founded in 1991 by Robert Boone, a former author and creative writing teacher from Winnetka, Illinois. YCA was established with the intent of inspiring the youth of Chicago to engage in creative writing to tell their stories. In 2009, Robert Boone was given an award at the Coming Up Tall Leadership Enhancement Conference in recognition of his work with YCA. This conference was hosted at the White House by former first lady, Michelle Obama, who was also born in Chicago.

== Serial Sexual Assaults and Coverup ==
At the 2013 National Poetry Slam in August, a "safe spaces" council was founded and gathered to identify sexual predators in the poetry community. During the national competition, Young Chicago Authors' Executive Director, Rebecca Hunter, was informed by the "safe spaces" council that a Young Chicago Authors (YCA) employee, Roger Bonair-Agard, was on the list of alleged sexual predators.

The same month, a Young Chicago Authors worker accused Bonair-Agard of rape. Hearing of this allegation, a former YCA student of Bonair-Agard's, Melissa, publicly accused Bonair-Agard of raping her when she was underage and he was almost twice as old as her. At the same time, Melissa provided Young Chicago Authors with extensive documentation of her allegation. Rebecca Hunter later said two other individuals came forward to share their alleged experiences of sexual assault by Bonair-Agard. These allegations spurred public concern that YCA was a danger to the youth it worked with. In February 2014, over 20 young authors submitted a list of demands for safer spaces to YCA. In response, the executive director, Rebecca Black, and the artistic director, Kevin Coval, said that Bonair-Agard was no longer contracted with YCA and that the organization was going through internal processes.

In late 2015 another Young Chicago Authors employee, Malcolm London, was accused of sexual assault. The survivor agreed to a community accountability process with London, Black Youth Project 100, and Mariame Kaba. However, in the months and years that followed, more accounts emerged of sexual assaults that allegedly occurred before the accountability process ended.

In 2019, London was accused of multiple sexual assaults again and posted an apology on Twitter for one of the assaults and for failing to follow the community accountability process. He was accused of another sexual assault in 2020 that allegedly occurred in 2018, prompting the survivor and the facilitator of the 2015 community accountability to release statements expressing their disappointment and anger.

On February 24, 2021, another poet and former Young Chicago Authors worker accused Bonair-Agard of raping her in 2013. The next day, YCA Executive Director Rebecca Hunter and Artistic Director Kevin Coval released a statement apologizing for their inaction and acknowledging that their response of ending Bonair-Agard's contract was not enough.

In response to the YCA statement, the president and founder of Button Poetry, Sam Van Cook, released a statement on March 3, 2021 disputing Hunter and Coval's claims "that they were not knowingly protecting and promoting serial abusers" and stated that it was "unconscionable to me that someone who dismissed serial rape allegations made by high school and college students for a full decade is still being enthusiastically celebrated as an organizer for young people". In Van Cook's statement he said, "I believe that Kevin Coval's leadership at YCA is a clear and present danger to the thousands of young people served through YCA and [the slam poetry tournament] Louder Than a Bomb (LTAB)."

Van Cook explained that in 2015 Button Poetry was approached by Haymarket Books, associates of Coval, to promote and sell Coval's first BreakBeat Poets anthology. Van Cook initially declined as the text featured Roger Bonair-Agar, whom he believed to be "a serial predator and rapist". Van Cook later agreed to sell the book on the condition that he could bring his concerns directly to Haymarket Books and Kevin Coval. He then met with staff at Young Chicago Authors, Haymarket Books, Button Poetry, and other community members and told Coval that he had directly spoken with numerous college students who said they had been raped, and groomed as minors, by Bonair-Agard. He also explained that these allegations had led to Bonair-Agard being banned from performing with ACUI, an organization that works with college poets.

In his statement, Van Cook recounted that, "throughout the conversation, Coval showed disinterest in the allegations and was dismissive of the issue, the specifics and the risk to his own students". Van Cook elaborated that he was left with the impression that, "Coval and his associates were fully aware of the numerous allegations against Bonair-Agard and willfully protecting, employing, and supporting a serial predator and rapist" and that in the years following the 2015 meeting, Kevin Coval and Young Chicago Authors "have not only continued to shelter Bonair-Agard but have publicly promoted his career and helped him maintain ongoing access to vulnerable minors".

The day after this damming statement was released, Young Chicago Authors' board of directors announced that Hunter had resigned from her executive director role, ahead of her planned departure in June 2021, and that Coval's employment had "been ended".

That same month in March 2021, Chicago Public Schools suspended its partnership with Young Chicago Authors due to the allegations against Bonair-Agard, the outcries from the poetry community, and Van Cook's statement alleging that YCA leadership knew Bonair-Agard was a genuine threat to the safety of youth speakers and staff, but continued to promote him. This led to extensive investigative journalism from the Chicago Reader that detailed 20 years of survivors' accounts of serial abuse from predators affiliated with YCA.

In March 2021, following Hunter's resignation, Young Chicago Authors installed a new executive director, Demetrius Amparan.

== Internal programs ==
=== Rooted & Radical (R&R) Youth Poetry Festival ===
Formerly known as Louder Than A Bomb (LTAB), this festival first brought YCA acknowledgment and recognition in Chicago's Poetry scene. The festival was put on pause and renamed after allegations of systemic coverup of serial sexual abuse were levied against Young Chicago Authors and its leadership.

This Rooted & Radical (R&R) Youth Poetry Festival contains Teaching Artists (TA) that aid in coaching and educating the youth about poetry and how to home in on the skill of creative expression through their workshops. Teaching Artists at YCA create personal curriculums based on their own strengths: visual language of poetry, expanded poetry, interpersonal dynamic and word choices. These TA's also create their own legacy by either having participated in YCA's festivals before becoming a TA or creating their own name after being a TA, such as Matt Muse (rapper former TA of YCA) and Dominique James (former champion LTAB and former TA of YCA).

=== Wordplay ===
Wordplay holds a significant value to the organization. This event is a weekly event that is a safe space for young and prospective poets to express themselves through creativity. Both Wordplay and YCA as an entity allow for the children to grow, learn, and prosper. They also both create a sense of community to bring people together.

== External programs ==
Following the firing of Kevin Coval and the resignation of Rebecca Hunter due to allegations that they had failed to address allegations of serial sexual assault and that Coval had promoted Bonair-Ager's access to youth, while allegedly knowing that he had been repeatedly accused of serially assaulting young women within YCA – including minors.

After their departures, YCA hosted a community event to attempt to re-establish trust with in the community. They shared their plans to move forward while taking measures to reassure the community that the alleged abuse and coverups would not occur again. YCA postponed their Louder than Bomb event and created workshops and town hall meetings.

Young Chicago Authors collaborated with Koio to create a sneaker to create awareness around black struggles, black mental health, and black communities. The poem the shoes were based on was inspired by the police murders of George Floyd and Breonna Taylor and 100% of the proceeds made from the sneaker go to GoodKids MadCity, Black Lives Matter, and Young Chicago Authors.
