= Assata's Daughters =

Chicago organization of black girls and young women

- Founded: 2015; 11 years ago
- Founder: Page May
- Type: Youth Organisation
- Location: Chicago, Illinois, United States
- Website: assatasdaughters.org

Assata's Daughters is an American black power organization of young radical African-American women and girls in Chicago, which operates through a Black, queer, feminist lens, that focuses on political education, organizing, and revolutionary services. The group is dedicated to radical liberatory activism in the tradition of Assata Shakur, a former member of the Black Liberation Army (BLA). The organization is often criticised for this connection, as Assata Shakur was convicted of first-degree murder, armed robbery, and other crimes in 1977 in the murder of a New Jersey State Trooper.

The group has adopted and expanded upon the tenants of the Ten-Point Program as its platform. This program was written by Huey Newton as the manifesto for the Black Panther Party, a Black Power organization which he co-founded. The group is part of the police abolition movement. Assata's daughters was founded in March 2015. Assata's Daughters is part of a cluster of black activist organizations known as the Movement for Black Lives. As of 2016, Assata's Daughters had 68 active members.

== Founding ==
Founded in 2015, Assata's Daughters is one of many contemporary organizations that set out to protest against police violence, specifically in the city of Chicago. The killing of Eric Garner and the subsequent protests are what led to the organization of Assata's Daughters in Chicago. The group engages in protest tactics similar to members of the Black Youth Project 100 in order to disrupt "business as usual" and raise awareness of their cause.

The activist group was founded by Page May, an African-American woman. May grew up in a nearly all-white town in Vermont, moved to Massachusetts to attend college, and arrived in Chicago for a fellowship. May has spent time in Chicago working with Black Youth Project 100, which she says cleared the way in legitimizing all-black, radical spaces, in turn paving the way for Assata's Daughters.

== Objectives ==
Assata's Daughters have adopted and expanded upon the Black Panther Party's Ten-Point Program, by adding an 11th point. The Black Panther's Ten-Point Program was:

1. We want freedom. We want power to determine the destiny of our Black Community.
2. We want full employment for our people.
3. We want an end to the robbery of our people by the capitalists of our Black Community
4. We want decent housing fit for the shelter of human beings.
5. We want education for our people that exposes the true nature of this decadent American society. We want education that teaches us our true history and our role in the present-day society.
6. We want all Black men to be exempt from military service.
7. We want an immediate end to police brutality and murder of Black people.
8. We want freedom for all Black men held in federal, state, county and city prisons and jails.
9. We want all black people when brought to trial to be tried in court by a jury of their peer group or people from their Black communities, as defined by the Constitution of the United States.
10. We want land, bread, housing, education, clothing, justice and peace.

Assata's Daughters' 11th point is:

11. The right to self-determination for gender and sexuality.

== Timeline of events and demonstrations ==
=== 2015 ===
- March 2015, Assata's Daughters was founded by Page May, Caira Conner, and Ariel Perkins in order to protest against the lack of response to Eric Garner's death.
- In October 2015, Assata's Daughters helped plan and then participated in a protest at the International Association of Chiefs of Police (IACP) Conference in Chicago. Assata's Daughters and other activist groups said that they protested the conference to bring attention to state-sanctioned violence.
- In November 2015, after the IACP protest, Assata's Daughters continued to speak out against police militarization in a letter that was co-written by We Charge Genocide, #Not1More, and BYP100.

=== 2016 ===
- On February 16, Assata's Daughters joined a number of anti-deportation and other activist groups to block the street in front of the Immigration and Customs Enforcement field office in downtown Chicago.
- On February 24, Assata's Daughters participated in the #ByeAnita protests to criticize the fact that it took State's Attorney Anita Alvarez a year to respond officially to the murder of Laquan McDonald by on-duty Chicago police officer Jason Van Dyke.
- In March, Assata's Daughters cited what it described as Donald Trump's racist rhetoric as the reason they protested against his rally in Chicago, which was cancelled after protests grew violent.
- On April 20, Assata's Daughters protested outside of Mayor Rahm Emanuel's office with BYP100, Black Lives Matter: Chicago, and Fearless Leading by the Youth to call for Chicago police officer Dante Servin to be fired without benefits and to demand funding for Chicago State University.
- In July, Assata's Daughters expanded its protest activity by standing in solidarity with Indigenous protesters against the Dakota Access Pipeline.

=== 2017 and 2018 ===
In 2017, Assata's Daughters received a $25,000 donation from American Football player Colin Kaepernick. Kaepernick donated to the organization again in 2018, giving $20,000. His contribution was supplemented further by $10,000 from comedian Hannibal Buress and another $10,000 from actress Yara Shahidi.

=== 2019 ===
In 2019, Assata's Daughters Headquarters, located at 235 E. 58th St, was seized and demolished by the City of Chicago after the city deemed the building structurally unsound. The demolition came after two fires had damaged the storefront strip on which the headquarters was located.

== Major protests ==
=== Death of Eric Garner ===
In July 2014, Eric Garner was killed during an altercation with police officers on Staten Island, New York. Police reports and eyewitness accounts differ on why there was an altercation, with police saying that Garner resisted arrest after they confronted him about selling untaxed cigarettes and eyewitness accounts suggesting that Garner had just broken up a fight between two people who ran away before the police arrived. Police officer Daniel Pantaleo used a chokehold against Garner, which is prohibited by department policy and led to Garner's death. Protests began soon after Garner's death, as no charges were brought against the police officer.

Assata's Daughters was founded eight months after Garner's killing because, according to cofounder Page May, the protests against the police killing of Garner were organized by old white people. The first protest May organized against Eric Garner's killing, in January 2015, involved a group of about 20 people. Their protest took place on Martin Luther King Jr. Day, and eventually grew to include about 700 participants, many of whom were children. Shortly afterward, the group named themselves Assata's Daughters and began meeting regularly.

=== #ByeAnita ===
Anita Alvarez was the State's Attorney for Cook County, Illinois, from 2008 until she lost her re-election bid in 2016. Alvarez was the target of Assata's Daughters and other activist organizations in Chicago during her re-election campaign because of her history of failing to prosecute police officers for various forms of discrimination, perjury, and other racially motivated misconduct.

The protesters cited the 2012 death of Rekia Boyd, a 22-year-old African-American woman, at the hands of Chicago police officer Dante Servin, with a sign that read "Justice for Rekia, No votes for Anita". Servin shot and killed Boyd while she was standing near his home with a group of people; Servin said he saw a gun in the group, but it turned out to be a cell phone. Alvarez was the State's Attorney at the time and she charged Servin with involuntary manslaughter, a charge of which he was acquitted in 2015.

Assata's Daughters also protested against Alvarez because her office received video footage that showed Chicago police officer Jason Van Dyke shoot Laquan MacDonald 16 times, including three shots that were fired when MacDonald was on the ground and no longer moving. She received the footage two weeks after the shooting, but did not press charges against Van Dyke until thirteen months later. During Alvarez's re-election bid, Assata's Daughters hung 16 banners around Chicago, to correspond to the 16 bullets fired into MacDonald, with slogans such as "#ByeAnita", "#AdiosAnita 16 shots and a cover up", and "Blood on the Ballot".
