= Blythe Baird =

American writer

- Born: August 5, 1996 (age 30)
- Education: Hamline University
- Writing career
- Notable works: Give Me a God I Can Relate To (2015) If My Body Could Speak (2019) Sweet, Young and Worried (2022)

Blythe Baird (born August 5, 1996) is an American poet, author, and actress from Chicago, Illinois. Her writing covers themes such as mental illness, eating disorders, sexuality, feminism, and trauma.

== Personal life and career ==
Blythe Baird grew up in Palatine, a village in Cook County, Illinois. Baird has been performing since childhood. She began acting at the community theater. She eventually pursued television and commercial roles, and she has appeared in projects such as Divergent (Neil Burger), The UnMiracle (Auslynn Films), Disconnected (Tribeca Flashpoint), and In Plain Sight (USA).

Throughout her adolescence, Baird struggled with eating disorders. During her sophomore year of high school, she went to intensive rehabilitation for her mental and physical health. Upon Baird's return to school, she became interested in poetry when poet Sierra DeMulder, who was brought in to perform, presented a poem on anorexia.

Baird joined “Slam Camp,” the slam poetry camp at which DeMulder taught. Afterwards, she began competing at slam competitions such as Lethal Poetry in Chicago, and Louder Than a Bomb, a youth poetry festival run by Young Chicago Authors.

In 2014, Baird began studying at Hamline University in St. Paul, Minnesota, from which she graduated in 2018 with a dual degree in creative writing and women's studies.

During her first year of college, Baird joined Button Poetry, a poetry company based in Minneapolis–Saint Paul, who published several of her poems on their YouTube channel. Baird has amassed more than 30 million cumulative views for her poetry performances online.

Baird has published three books as of April 2023. Her first book, Give Me a God I Can Relate To, was published in 2015. On February 5, 2019, Baird's second book, If My Body Could Speak, a collection of poems she wrote from ages 17–21, was published through Button Poetry. Her third book, Sweet, Young and Worried, was published on November 29, 2022. In her writing, Baird discusses topics such as mental health, eating disorders, sexuality, healing, and trauma.

== Awards and honors ==
Baird's work has been featured by BuzzFeed, Glamour, ELLE, and TEDxMinneapolis.

In 2014, she was selected as the youngest competitor for the national team representing Chicago's Lethal Poetry group at the 2014 National Poetry Slam. In 2016, Baird was chosen as a finalist for the EduZine Global Young Achiever Award. In 2017, she won the ADCAN short film award for a film adaptation of her poem “When The Fat Girl Gets Skinny,” and she received the first place award in the Art With Impact short film competition. In 2020, Baird was given the McKnight Fellowship for Writers, Loft Award in Spoken Word by the Loft Literary Center in Minnesota, and a $25,000 grant.
