= Idris Goodwin =

American dramatist

- Born: Detroit, Michigan, U.S.
- Education: Columbia College Chicago (BA); School of the Art Institute of Chicago (MFA); University of Iowa
- Occupations: playwright, rapper, essayist, and poet
- Years active: 2001-present
- Website: idrisgoodwin.com

Idris Goodwin is an American playwright, rapper, essayist, and poet. In July 2022, Idris Goodwin became the third Artistic Director of Seattle Children's Theatre.

== Early life ==
Idris Goodwin was born in Detroit, Michigan. He earned a Bachelor of Arts in Film, Video, and Screenwriting at Columbia College Chicago. Goodwin received his Master of Fine Arts in Creative Writing at the School of the Art Institute of Chicago. He did graduate work at the University of Iowa Playwrights Workshop.

== Career ==
The first play Goodwin ever wrote was titled Braising in 2001, and was performed in the back of a coffee shop. Goodwin recalls that the play was "thrown together and done on a budget… and miraculously we got a great review."

Since then he has written and had several successful plays produced such as And in This Corner… Cassius Clay (2016), which received the 2017 Distinguished Play Award from The American Association of Theater and Education

And in This Corner... Cassius Clay (2016) was commissioned by Stage One Family Theater in Louisville, Kentucky, in partnership with the Muhammad Ali Center. During Metro Theater Company's follow up production, they initiated The Cassius Project, which included a website with details of Ali's life, juxtaposing it with major points of the civil rights movement.

How We Got On (2013), was developed at the Eugene O'Neill Playwriting Conference and premiered in the Actors Theater's 2012 Humana Festival and was also nominated for an ATCA Steinberg New Play Award.

Goodwin has earned awards from the Hip Hop Theater festival, The Illinois Arts Council, the National Endowment for the Arts, the Ford Foundation, the Mellon Foundation, and the Edgerton Foundation. In 2017, Goodwin won the Blue Ink Playwriting Award for HYPE MAN:a break beat play. The play takes place in wake of a controversial police shooting and it was selected as the winner in a pool of 543 submissions. HYPE MAN received its world premiere at Company One in 2018. It won the Elliot Norton Award for Best New Play that same year. Numerous theatres across the country produced Hype Man through 2018 and 2019 including, The Flea Theater and The Fountain Theatre.

Goodwin lectures at colleges, high schools/middle schools, and other venues all throughout the United States. He also credits playwright Lorraine Hansberry, playwright August Wilson, and Chuck D of Public Enemy as inspirations for his work.

Goodwin has been featured on Def Poetry Jam, and was part of the cast on the documentary film What's On Your Plate (2009), a narrative about two eleven-year-old African-American exploring their place in society. He also performed on PBS’s Sesame Street, and for National Public Radio. He is also featured in the 2010 Youth Poetry documentary Louder Than a Bomb.

Write Bloody Books published "These are the Breaks" Goodwin's collection of essays and poems in 2011. The collection of essays was nominated for a Pushcart Prize in the same year. It was in this book, along with his 2010 album Break Beat Poems that Goodwin coined the term Break Beat Poetry.

In May 2020, Idris Goodwin became the Director of the Colorado Springs Fine Arts Center at Colorado College

In 2021, he wrote and performed the song "Black History (It's Yours)".

He currently serves as the Artistic Director of Seattle Children's Theater

Idris is a 2021 United States Artist Fellow.

== Plays ==
- Braising – 2001
- How We Got On (the first break beat play) – 2012
- Blackademics – 2012
- Bars and Measures- 2014
- The Raid – 2015
- This is Modern Art (based on true events) – 2015
- And in This Corner...Cassius Clay −2016
- The Realness: a break beat play-2016
- HYPE MAN: a break beat play – 2017
- The Way the Mountain Moved – 2018
- Frankenstein – 2018
- Ghost (based upon the novel by Jason Reynolds) – 2019
- The Boy Who Kissed the Sky – 2022

== Albums ==
- Break Beat Poems −2010
- Break Beat Bars −2011
- Rhyming While Black −2014
