= CSFB =

CSFB may refer to:

- Cabbage-stem flea beetle, a pest of oilseed rape in Northern Europe.
- Credit Suisse First Boston, the current (2022–present) and former (1996–2006) investment bank of Credit Suisse.
- College Students for Bernie, a former organization dedicated to increase young voter participation, during Bernie Sanders 2016 presidential campaign.
- Circuit Switch Fall Back (or CS fallback), a feature in LTE telecommunications.
