= Charlene Carruthers =

American activist and author

Charlene A. Carruthers
- Born: 1985 (age 40–41); Chicago, Illinois, United States
- Education: Illinois Wesleyan University 2007; Washington University in St. Louis 2009; Northwestern University 2020-present
- Occupation: Black Youth Project 100 National Director
- Years active: 2013-2018

Charlene A. Carruthers is a black queer feminist activist and author whose work focuses on leadership development. Carruthers has worked with high-profile activist organizations including Color of Change and Women's Media Center, and she was an integral founding member of Black Youth Project 100. She served as BYP100's founding National Director or National Coordinator from 2013-2018.

== Activist career ==
Carruthers cites her studies in South Africa at age 18 as her political awakening. Much of her work since has centered on developing broad based political participation and leadership for marginalized communities. She was worked with or sat on the boards of the Arcus Foundation, SisterSong Women of Color Reproductive Justice Collective, Wellstone Action, and the NAACP. She has also focused on coalition-building between different marginalized groups, including traveling as part of a delegation of African-American activists to Palestine to create personal and organizational ties between organizers in both countries. In US electoral politics, Carruthers expressed her intent to vote for Joe Biden in the 2020 elections.

=== Black Youth Project 100 ===
In July 2013, Carruthers was one of 100 black millennial activist leaders from across the country assembled by the Black Youth Project in Chicago for a meeting aimed at building networks of organization for black youth activism across the country. On the second day of that meeting news from Florida announced the acquittal of George Zimmerman on an all charges relating to his February 26, 2012 killing of Trayvon Martin. This verdict galvanized Carruthers and the other activists into the formation of the Black Youth Project 100 to organize young black activism in resistance to structural oppressions.

Though initially hesitant to assume the role of national coordinator herself, Carruthers ultimately came to realize the rare opportunity afforded by the erupting turmoil. The BYP100 invests heavily in the training of leaders and the teaching of reformers, empowering a generation of black activism. In public actions and in the press Carruthers has emphasized that oppressive structures like race, gender, sexuality, and economic status overlap with one another in such a way that prohibits the resistance to any one structure at a time. Rather, they demand united action by marginalized action to overturn the whole system together. BYP100's initiatives embody this outlook of intersecting oppressions by targeting issues that tie into multiple systemic oppressions. For instance the publication "Agenda to Keep us Safe" identifies economic justice and the development of local economic power as essential tools to achieve gender and racial justice. Carruthers has been a particularly vocal critic of how the prison-industrial complex and the school-to-prison pipeline play a huge role in shaping the experiences of oppression for people and communities of color, transgender & non-binary people, and the poor.

=== Police brutality ===
Carruthers is an outspoken critic of unchecked police brutality, inadequate government responsiveness to major brutality cases, and the American criminal justice system's fundamental motivations and mechanisms. In August 2014, she went to Ferguson, Missouri to train and organize black youth response as the city reeled from the shooting of 18-year-old Mike Brown at the hands of Darren Wilson.

==== Chicago Police Department ====
As a native of Chicago's South Side, Carruthers has been a frequent critic of the Chicago Police Department, organizing demonstrations over the fatal shooting of 22-year-old Rekia Boyd. Carruthers also responded to the murder of 17-year-old Laquan McDonald by an on-duty police officer, condemning the city's handling of the event, especially the involvement of the mayor's office in the year long coverup of the footage. She demanded the resignation of Mayor Rahm Emanuel and Cook County State Attorney Anita Alvarez.

=== Films ===
In 2022, Carruthers wrote, directed, and co-produced The Funnel, a short film about love, ancestral power, and the Black experience of displacement and resilience. Carruthers also directed and co-wrote, with Deivid Rojas, La Salida that same year. In 2025 she directed, wrote, and starred in Plenum, a short about "two siblings navigate the AIDS crisis at a historical Black queer conference."

== Published works ==
- Carruthers, Charlene (2018), "Hearing Assata Shakur's Call: A Black Feminist Reflection on "To My People"", WSQ: Women's Studies Quarterly, 46 (3–4): 222–225, doi:10.1353/wsq.2018.0042, OCLC 7900054322, S2CID 91312572
- Carruthers, Charlene (2018), Unapologetic: a Black, queer, and feminist mandate for radical movements, Boston, Massachusetts: Beacon Press, OCLC 1014037040
