= Build Yourself a Boat =

2019 poetry collection by Camonghne Felix

- First edition cover
- Author: Camonghne Felix
- Language: English
- Genre: Poetry
- Publisher: Haymarket Books
- Publication date: 2019
- Publication place: United States
- Media type: Print (paperback, hardback), ebook
- Pages: 72
- ISBN: 9781608466115

Build Yourself a Boat is a 2019 poetry collection by Camonghne Felix, published by Haymarket. It is Felix's debut full-length poetry collection.

== Reception ==
Build Yourself a Boat was longlisted for the 2019 National Book Award for Poetry. It was also a finalist for the 2020 PEN/Open Book Award.

Reviewing the collection for The Kenyon Review, Ari McMullen described the book as formally attentive to revelation, withholding, and self-assembly.

In The Rumpus, Emily Pérez wrote that the collection explores the tension between self-reliance and isolation, and discusses personal and societal harm in relation to Black womanhood.
