= Marxist philosophy =

Philosophy influenced by Marxist thought

Marxist philosophy or Marxist theory comprises works in philosophy strongly influenced by Karl Marx's materialist approach to theory, or works written by Marxists. It may be broadly divided into Western Marxism, which drew from various sources, and the official philosophy in the Soviet Union, which enforced a rigid reading of dialectical materialism, particularly during the 1930s. Marxist philosophy is not a strictly defined sub-field of philosophy, because the diverse influence of Marxist theory has extended into fields as varied as aesthetics, ethics, ontology, epistemology, social philosophy, political philosophy, the philosophy of science, and the philosophy of history. Key characteristics of Marxism in philosophy are its materialism and its commitment to political practice as the goal of all thought.

The theory is also concerned with the struggles of the proletariat and their critique of the bourgeoisie.

Marxist theorist Louis Althusser, for example, defined the philosophy as "class struggle in theory", thus radically separating himself from those who claimed philosophers could adopt a "God's eye view" as a purely neutral judge.

== Marxism and philosophy ==
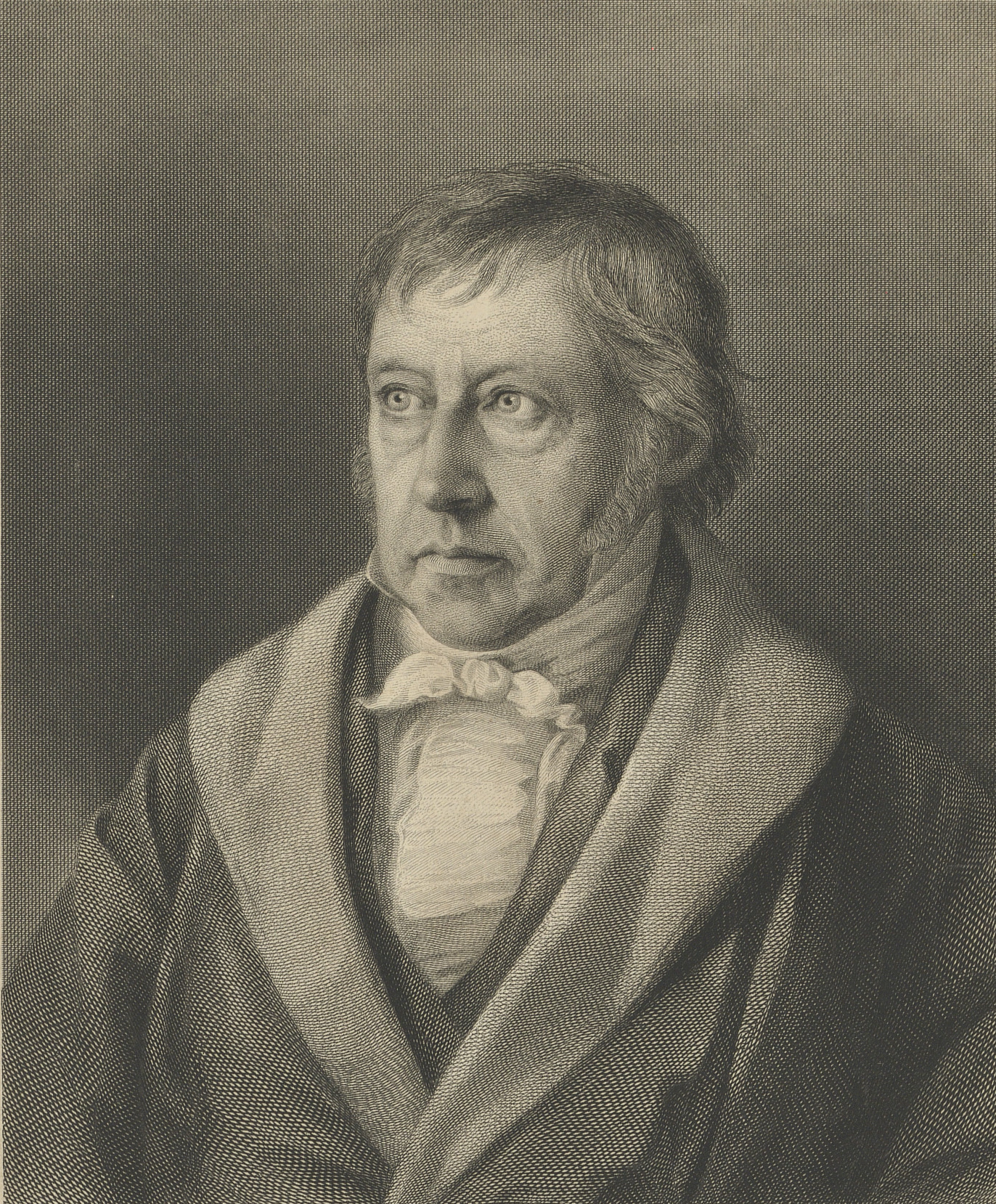
Georg Wilhelm Friedrich Hegel was an important figure in the development of Marxism.

There are many interpretations of the "philosophy of Marx", both within and outside the Marxist movement. Some scholars distinguish between a "young Marx" (in particular the Economic and Philosophical Manuscripts of 1844) and a "mature Marx", or divide his output into purely philosophical works, economic works, and political and historical interventions. Étienne Balibar has argued that Marx's works can be divided into "economic works" (Das Kapital, 1867), "philosophical works", and "historical works" (The Eighteenth Brumaire of Louis Bonaparte; the 1871 The Civil War in France, which concerned the Paris Commune and acclaimed it as the first "dictatorship of the proletariat"; etc.). Balibar further argued that if any philosopher could be called a "Marxist philosopher", it would undoubtedly be Louis Althusser:

Althusser proposed a 'new definition' of philosophy as "class struggle in theory"... Marxism had proper signification (and original "problematic") only insofar as it was the theory of the tendency towards communism, and in view of its realization. The criteria of acceptance or rejection of a 'marxist' proposition was always the same, whether it was presented as 'epistemological' or as 'philosophical': it was in the act of rendering intelligible a communist policy, or not.

=== Marx's critique of Feuerbach ===
What distinguished Marx from Feuerbach was his view of Feuerbach's humanism as excessively abstract, and therefore no less ahistorical and idealist than what it purported to replace: the reified notion of God found in institutional Christianity, which legitimized the repressive power of the Prussian state. Instead, Marx sought to give ontological priority to what he called the "real life process" of real human beings, as he and Engels wrote in The German Ideology (1846):

In direct contrast to German philosophy, which descends from heaven to earth, here we ascend from earth to heaven. That is to say, we do not set out from what men say, imagine, conceive, nor from men as narrated, thought of, imagined, conceived, in order to arrive at men in the flesh. We set out from real, active men, and on the basis of their real life process we demonstrate the development of the ideological reflexes and echoes of this life process. The phantoms formed in the human brain are also, necessarily, sublimates of their material life process, which is empirically verifiable and bound to material premises. Morality, religion, metaphysics, all the rest of ideology and their corresponding forms of consciousness, thus no longer retain the semblance of independence. They have no history, no development; but men, developing their material production and their material intercourse, alter, along with this, their real existence, their thinking, and the products of their thinking. Life is not determined by consciousness, but consciousness by life.

=== Historical materialism ===
Marx summarized the materialist aspect of his theory of history, otherwise known as historical materialism (a term coined by Engels and popularized by Karl Kautsky and Georgi Plekhanov), in the 1859 preface to A Contribution to the Critique of Political Economy:

In the social production of their existence, men inevitably enter into definite relations, which are independent of their will, namely relations of production appropriate to a given stage in the development of their material forces of production. The totality of these relations of production constitutes the economic structure of society, the real foundation, on which arises a legal and political superstructure and to which correspond definite forms of social consciousness. The mode of production of material life conditions the general process of social, political and intellectual life. It is not the consciousness of men that determines their existence, but their social existence that determines their consciousness.

=== Ethics and human rights ===
Marx's critique of the ideology of human rights departs from the counter-revolutionary critique by Edmund Burke, who dismissed the "rights of Man" in favour of the "rights of the individual". It is not grounded in opposition to the Enlightenment's universalism and humanist project on behalf of the right of tradition, as in Burke's case, but rather on the claim that the ideology of economism and the ideology of human rights are two sides of the same coin. However, as Étienne Balibar puts it, "the accent put on those contradictions can not not ring out on the signification of 'human rights', since these therefore appears both as the language in which exploitation masks itself and as the one in which the exploited class struggle express itself: more than a truth or an illusion, it is therefore a stake". In Das Kapital, Marx ironizes the "pompous catalogue of the 'inalienable rights of man'" in comparison to the "modest Magna Charta of a working day limited by law":

The creation of a normal working-day is, therefore, the product of a protracted civil war, more or less dissembled, between the capitalist class and the working-class... It must be acknowledged that our labourer comes out of the process of production other than he entered. In the market he stood as owner of the commodity "labour-power" face to face with other owners of commodities, dealer against dealer. The contract by which he sold to the capitalist his labour-power proved, so to say, in black and white that he disposed of himself freely. The bargain concluded, it is discovered that he was no "free agent," that the time for which he is free to sell his labour-power is the time for which he is forced to sell it, that in fact the vampire will not lose its hold on him "so long as there is a muscle, a nerve, a drop of blood to be exploited." For "protection" against "the serpent of their agonies," the labourers must put their heads together, and, as a class, compel the passing of a law, an all-powerful social barrier that shall prevent the very workers from selling, by voluntary contract with capital, themselves and their families into slavery and death. In place of the pompous catalogue of the "inalienable rights of man" comes the modest Magna Charta of a legally limited working-day, which shall make clear "when the time which the worker sells is ended, and when his own begins." Quantum mutatus ab illo! [How changed from what he was!]

The communist revolution, on this account, does not merely negate individual liberty and equality ("collectivism" (Note: Louis Dumont argued that Marx represented an exacerbated individualism rather than the holism implied by the popular interpretation of Marxism as "collectivism".)). Rather, it culminates in the "negation of the negation": "individual property" under the capitalist regime is itself the "expropriation of the immediate producers".

Self-earned private property, that is based, so to say, on the fusing together of the isolated, independent laboring-individual with the conditions of his labor, is supplanted by capitalistic private property, which rests on exploitation of the nominally free labor of others, i.e., on wage-labor... The capitalist mode of appropriation, the result of the capitalist mode of production, produces capitalist private property. This is the first negation of individual private property, as founded on the labor of the proprietor. But capitalist production begets, with the inexorability of a law of Nature, its own negation. It is the negation of negation. This does not re-establish private property for the producer, but gives him individual property based on the acquisition of the capitalist era: i.e., on co-operation and the possession in common of the land and of the means of production.

The relationship between Marxist theory and ethical action was later taken up by Leon Trotsky, who in 1938 wrote Their Morals and Ours, an ethical polemic responding to criticism of his actions during the Kronstadt rebellion and to broader questions about the perceived "amoral" methods of the Bolsheviks. Critics believed these methods seemed to emulate the Jesuit maxim that "the end justifies the means". Trotsky argued that Marxism located the foundation of morality in society and in the service of social interests, rather than in "eternal moral truths" proclaimed by institutional religions. He nevertheless regarded it as farcical to assert that an end could justify any criminal means and viewed this as a distorted representation of the Jesuit maxim. Instead, Trotsky believed that means and ends frequently "exchanged places", as when democracy is sought by the working class as an instrument to actualize socialism. He also viewed revolution as deducible from laws of development and primarily from class struggle, but this did not mean that all means were permissible.

=== Revisionism ===
In Marxist philosophy, "revisionism", otherwise known as "Marxist reformism", represents various ideas, principles, and theories that are based on a reform or revision of Marxism. According to their critics, this involves a significant revision of fundamental Marxist theories and premises, and usually involves making an alliance with the bourgeois class. Some academic economists have used revisionism to describe post-Stalinist, Eastern European writers who criticized one-party rule and argued in favour of freedom of the press and of the arts, intra- and sometimes inter-party democracy, independent labour unions, the abolition of bureaucratic privileges, and the subordination of police forces to the judiciary power.

In Marxist discourse, revisionism often carries pejorative connotations and the term has been used by many different factions. It is typically applied to others and rarely as a self-description. By extension, Marxists who view themselves as fighting against revisionism have often self-identified as Marxist–Leninist anti-revisionists. Revisionism is most often used as an epithet by those Marxists who believe that such revisions are unwarranted and represent a watering down or abandonment of Marxism—one such common example is the negation of class struggle.

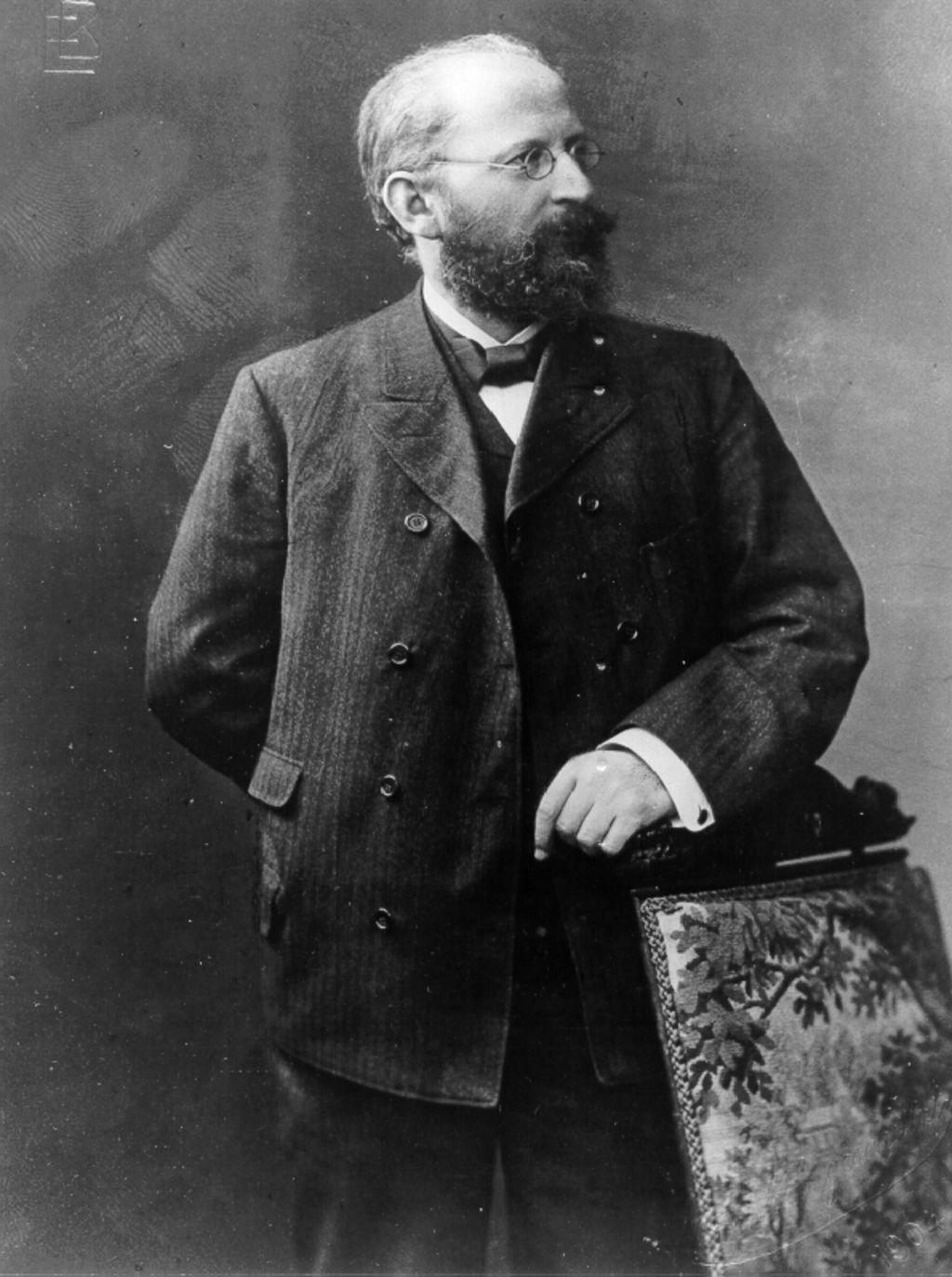
Eduard Bernstein, an early revisionist

Revisionism has been used in a number of contexts to refer to different or claimed revisions of Marxist theory. Those who opposed Karl Marx's revolution through his lens of class struggle and sought out non-revolutionary or more conciliatory means for a change are known as revisionists. Eduard Bernstein, a close acquaintance of Marx and Friedrich Engels, was one of the first major revisionists, and was prominent in the Social Democratic Party of Germany (SPD).

In the late 19th century, the term revisionism was used to describe reformist socialist writers, such as Bernstein, who sought to revise Marx's ideas about the transition to socialism and claimed that a revolution was not necessary to achieve a socialist society. The views of Bernstein gave rise to evolutionary socialism, which asserts that socialism can be achieved through gradual peaceful reforms from within a capitalist system.

== Differences within Marxist philosophy ==
The status of humanism in Marxist thought has been contentious. Many Marxists, especially Hegelian Marxists and those associated with some Communist parties, have adopted strongly humanist positions. These humanist Marxists argue that Marxism identifies what they regard as the true potential of human beings and that this potential can be realized in collective freedom once communist revolution removes capitalism's constraints on and subjugation of humanity. A particular version of humanism within Marxism is represented by the school founded by Lev Vygotsky in theoretical psychology, including Alexei Leontiev and László Garai.

== Key works and authors ==
- Karl Marx and Friedrich Engels, especially the earlier writings such as The 1844 Manuscripts, The German Ideology and "Theses on Feuerbach", but also the Grundrisse, Das Kapital and other works inspired
- Theodor Adorno
- Louis Althusser
- Alain Badiou
- Étienne Balibar
- Walter Benjamin
- Ernst Bloch
- Nikolai Bukharin
- Amadeo Bordiga
- Cornelius Castoriadis
- Maurice Cornforth
- Guy Debord
- Joseph Dietzgen
- Hal Draper
- Raya Dunayevskaya
- Laszlo Garai
- Antonio Gramsci
- Jürgen Habermas
- CLR James
- Fredric Jameson
- Karl Kautsky
- Karl Korsch
- Antonio Labriola
- Paul Lafargue
- Henri Lefebvre
- Claude Lefort
- Vladimir Lenin
- Georg Lukács, History and Class Consciousness developed the theory of ideology to include a more complex model of class consciousness
- Rosa Luxemburg
- Herbert Marcuse
- Ralph Miliband, often considered a main proponent of Instrumental Marxism, however some dispute this
- Ho Chi Minh
- Antonio Negri
- Antonie Pannekoek
- Georgi Plekhanov
- Georges Politzer
- Jacques Rancière
- Helmut Reichelt
- M. N. Roy
- Jean-Paul Sartre
- Leon Trotsky,"Their Morals and Ours"
- Deng Xiaoping
- Mao Zedong
- Slavoj Žižek

== See also ==
- Category:Marxist theorists and list of contributors to Marxist theory
- Critical theory
- Dialectical materialism
- Freudo-Marxism
- Marxist ethics
- Marxist explanations of warfare
- Marxist feminism
- Neo-Marxism
- Marxist humanism
- Orthodox Marxism
- Post-Marxism
- Analytical Marxism
- Rethinking Marxism

== Bibliography ==
- Balibar, Étienne, The Philosophy of Marx. Verso, 1995 (French edition: La philosophie de Marx, La Découverte, Repères, 1991)
- Bottomore, Thomas, ed.. A Dictionary of Marxist Thought. Blackwell, 1991.
- Balibar, Étienne (1995). The Philosophy of Marx. Translated by Chris Turner. London: Verso.
- Balibar, Étienne (1991). Écrits pour Althusser. Paris: La Découverte.
- Knei-Paz, Baruch (1978). The Social and Political Thought of Leon Trotsky. Oxford: Clarendon Press.
- Marx, Karl (1867). "Chapter X: The Working Day". Capital: A Critique of Political Economy. Vol. 1.
- Marx, Karl; Engels, Friedrich (1846). "Part I: Feuerbach. Opposition of the Materialist and Idealist Outlook". The German Ideology.
- Marx, Karl (1859). "Preface". A Contribution to the Critique of Political Economy.
