= Malcolm London =

Poet, performer, activist

Malcolm London is an American poet, educator, "artivist", and musician.

== Early life ==
London was born in 1993 and grew up in the west side of Chicago in Austin. He first started writing poems at age 12. He attended Lincoln Park High School. In his sophomore year, London won individual honors at the Louder Than a Bomb youth poetry competition. When he was 20, he gave a TED talk where he read a portion of his poem, "High School Training Ground".

After graduating from high school in 2011, London began working for Kevin Coval, a fellow poet and educator who helped create the Louder Than A Bomb poetry festival. London was paid to help with the organization Young Chicago Authors, talking at local schools and running poetry workshops with students in the area.

== Career ==
In 2012, London worked with actor Matt Damon as part of an event called "The People Speak Live!". He appeared on a television series called "Verses & Flow". He read a poem entitled, "The First Time in a While" which was based on a peer of London's who had been killed in a fight. London was the youngest poet to appear in the first three seasons of the show.

London appeared in several TED Talks with John Legend and Bill Gates, and hosted events and performances with fellow YCA alum Chance the Rapper and rapper Lupe Fiasco. His performances of poetry have taken place at the Chicago Jazz Festival, the Du Sable Museum, the Vic Theater, The Metro, The Chicago Theater, Victory Gardens Theatre, and Steppenwolf Theater. London was the co-chair of the Chicago chapter of the Black Youth Project 100 and has done service for Chicago Public Schools. He was a member of UCAN's National Forum on Youth Violence Prevention.

Some of London's most famous poems are "High School Training Ground," "Never Too Late," "Rome Wasn't Built In A Day (Love Sosa)," and "Why You Talk Like That."

== Police Encounters ==
In 2015, London was arrested at a protest against the murder of Laquan McDonald. London was a leader in the Black Youth Project 100 (BYP100), a group that helped organize the protests. London suffered a broken finger and filed a lawsuit with the Westside Justice Center.

== Sexual Assaults ==
In late 2015 a woman named Kyra published an open letter on Facebook alleging that she was sexually assaulted by Malcolm London in her sleep three years prior. After her account went public, she expressed interest in a community accountability process with London, as the court process that followed past reports had been "equally as traumatizing as the assault itself". London agreed to a community accountability process with Black Youth Project 100, Kyra, and Mariame Kaba which began in November 2015. The community accountability (CA) process ended after 15 months after "the goals that had been set for the process were met".

However, in the following months and years more accounts of sexual assaults came out, most having allegedly occurred before the end of the CA process.

In 2019, London was again accused of multiple sexual assaults and he posted an apology on Twitter for one of the assaults and for his failure to abide by the values and practices set by the community accountability process. In 2020, London was accused of raping a young woman in 2018. Subsequently, the survivor from the 2015 community accountability process, Kyra, and one of the facilitators, Mariame Kaba, posted public comments expressing their sorrow, anger, and disappointment that London had continued to harm people.

London was one of several artists and youth mentors employed by Young Chicago Authors who were accused of sexual assault - including Roger Bonair-Agard, leading to Chicago Public Schools suspending its partnership with Young Chicago Authors in March 2021. This led to investigations by Chicago Reader that chronicled over 20 years of survivors' accounts of abuse by predators affiliated with YCA.
