= Their Morals and Ours =

1938 book by Leon Trotsky

Their Morals and Ours: The class foundations of moral practice
- Author: Leon Trotsky
- Original title: Their Morals and Ours
- Translator: Victor Serge (French)
- Language: Russian
- Genre: Nonfiction
- Publisher: Pathfinder Books (America)
- Publication date: 1938
- Publication place: Soviet Union
- Media type: Print

Their Morals and Ours is a short pamphlet of ethical essays written by Russian revolutionary, Leon Trotsky, in 1938 against various lines of criticisms presented against the perceived actions of Bolsheviks in that "end justifies the means".

== Background ==
There had been an increasing disillusionment among left-wing intellectuals with the advent of Stalinism and the viability of Marxism following the Russian Revolution. A number of Trotsky's associates such as Max Eastman, Victor Serge, Boris Souvarine, Ante Ciliga had raised questions about his responsibility over the suppression of the Kronstadt rebellion in 1921. This has prompted some figures to trace the origin of Stalinism to this initial prelude of repression.

Trotsky defended his action that the Kronstadt rebels would have been a proxy for counter-revolutionary forces and insisted that there was indeed a moral alongside political difference between his use of violence in the civil war as an exercise of the government to defend itself and the later terror monopolised under Stalin. Contrastingly, Trotsky situated the origin of Stalinism in material factors such as the defeat of communism in the West, the poverty and isolation of the Soviet Union, conflicts between the town and country along with the "logic" of the single party system. In the face of this mounting criticism, Trotsky would develop and articulate his response with the extended essay, Their Morals and Ours.

== Content ==
The first section weighed the specific criticisms that categorise Marxism and Bolshevism in particular as "amoral" due to their perceived adherence to the praxis that the "end justifies the means". Trotsky argued that moral criteria are firmly rooted in their material context rather than "eternal moral truths" based on religious revelation or a particular conception of human nature. He further rejected the abstract generalization of virtue norms in the manner of Immanuel Kant's "categorical imperative" as he considered this precept to lack any concrete basis.

Trotsky proceeded to argue that norms of virtue developed by the character of social relations and viewed the notion that the end could justify any means to be an absurd caricature of Jesuit norms. He further rejected the equivocation between violence employed by oppressed groups and violence utilized by oppressor groups as stated:

"History has different yardsticks for the cruelty of the Northerners and the cruelty of the Southerners in the Civil War. A slave-owner who through cunning and violence shackles a slave in chains, and a slave who through cunning or violence breaks the chains -lets not the contemptible eunuchs tells us that they are equals before a court of morality".

Trotsky believed that the means and ends frequently "exchanged places" as when democracy is sought by the working class as an instrument to actualize socialism. He also viewed revolution to be deducible from the laws of the development and primarily the class struggle but this did not mean all means are permissible. Fundamentally, Trotsky argued that ends "rejects" means which are incompatible with itself. In other words, socialism cannot be furthered through fraud, deceit or the worship of leaders but through honesty and integrity as essential elements of revolutionary morality in dealing with the working masses.

In the middle section of the essay, Trotsky argued that several differences existed between Stalinist morality and Leninism along his own actions. Trotsky argued that Stalin's objectives were not "the liberation of mankind" but its enslavement in a new totalitarian form. Specifically, he argued that Lenin had employed terror and violence during the most challenging period of the revolution, the Russian Civil War, whereas Stalin had renewed these severe methods as a normal method of government.

Inversely, Trotsky would defend some of his wartime decisions such as enacting hostage-taking but argued that none of the relatives of commanders who did betray the army and contribute to additional human casualties, were themselves ever executed. He further maintained that had these draconian measures been adopted rather than “superfluous generosity” to opponents at the start of the October Revolution then Russia would have experienced far less casualties. In parallel, Trotsky noted that this measure had been similarly utilized by members of the Paris Commune and The Spanish Republicans to counter initial acts of disproportionate violence conducted by their enemies.

Trotsky demarcated Stalinism from the October Revolution in several areas:

"Stalinism in turn is not an abstraction of "dictatorship", but an immense bureaucratic reaction gains the proletarian dictatorship in a backward and isolated country. The October Revolution abolished privileges, waged war against social inequality, replaced the bureaucracy with self-government of the toilers, abolished secret diplomacy, strove to render all social relationship completely transparent. Stalinism reestablished the most offensive forms of privileges, imbued inequality with a provocative character, strangled mass self-activity under police absolutism, transformed administration into a monopoly of the Kremlin oligarchy and regenerated the fetishism of power in forms that absolute monarchy dared not dream of".

According to political scientist Knei-Paz, the final section of the essay examined the question of terrorism. In these final paragraphs, Trotsky reiterated the established Marxian attitude in which terror directed at "individual oppressors" is legitimate as an exercise of a mass working-class movement rather than individuals for the purpose of human liberation. Trotsky argued that this could not be subjected to judgements premised on moral absolutes which denounced any form of violence.

== Reception ==
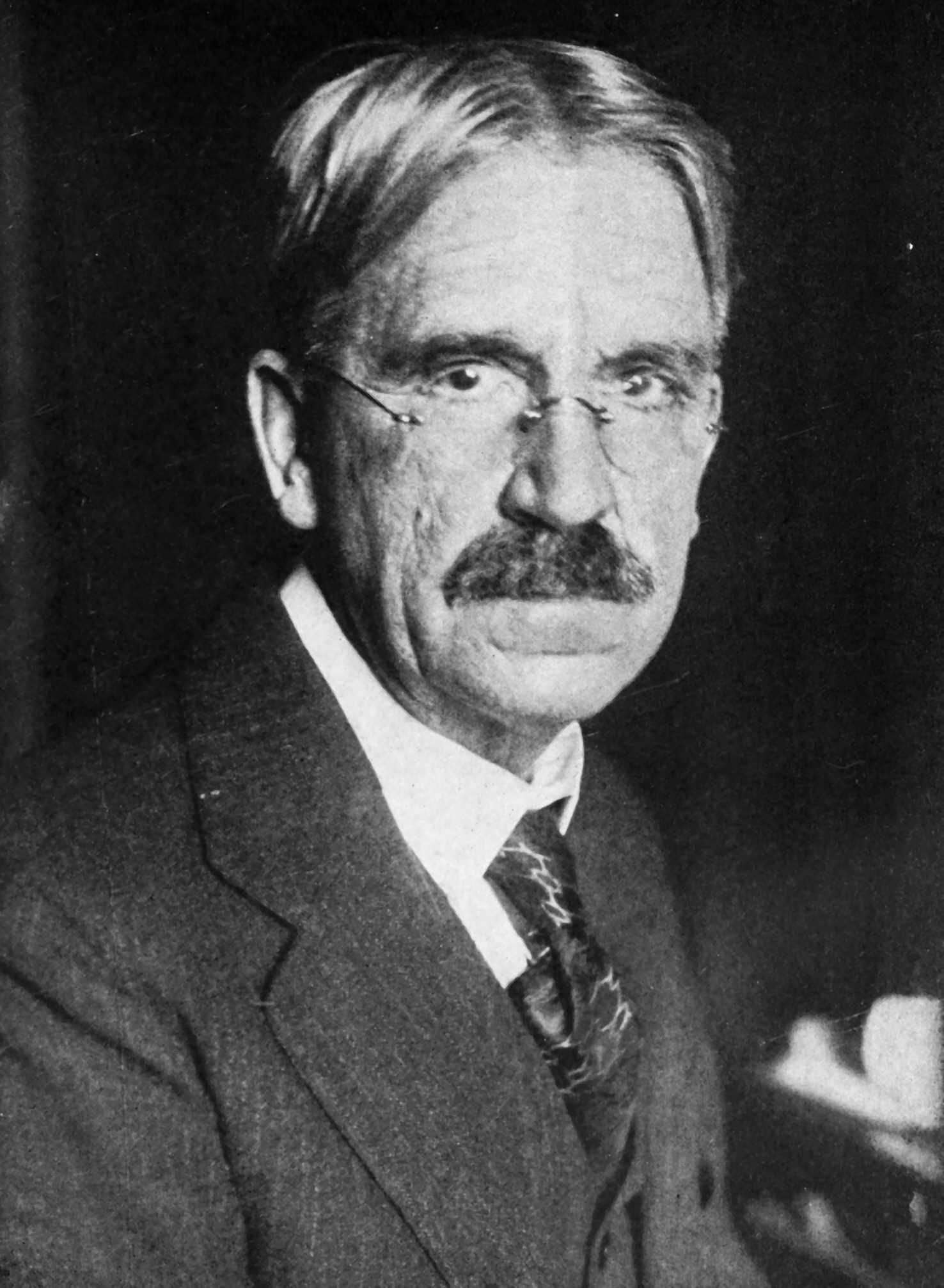
John Dewey oversaw the 1937 Dewey Commission which investigated the charges against Trotsky in the Moscow Trials.

The publication of the work provoked a number of written responses. American philosopher, John Dewey, was critical of his deductive approach and had written a reply shortly afterwards. Dewey accepted Trotsky's analysis of the relationship between Marxist ends and means along with the interdependence of these axioms which were formulated for the liberation of mankind as the ultimate end. However, Dewey argued that Trotsky's line of thinking had exhibited a logical fallacy and he had been inconsistent in the application of his arguments. Dewey also believed that orthodox Marxism shared strong parallels with orthodox religions and idealism in the belief that human ends are interlaced with structure of existence. According to Deutscher, Trotsky believed that Dewey's arguments were a familiar restatement of disillusioned figures who eventually disavowed revolutionary politics and accepted the established status quo. Later Marxist theoretician, George Novack would later issue a rebuttal to Dewey's criticisms with his essay, Liberal Morality, in 1965 published in the International Socialist Review.

The book had also ignited personal controversy with his long-standing political associate, Victor Serge. Trotsky had incorrectly assumed that Serge had authorised an ad hominem attack of him in a French translation of the work without verifying the facts with either Serge or the French publisher. This was in part due to his growing isolation from political events in exile. Serge would later write a manuscript in 1940 in which he characterised Trotsky as the "last great representative of a great historical event" from the revolutionary era but argued there was a "germ of an entire totalitarian mentality" which manifested in the increasing intolerance of other left-wing groups such as anarchists and socialists among the Bolsheviks. He also expressed the view that Trotsky did not sufficiently distinguish the nature and varied motives of criticisms directed at Bolshevik rule. As an example, Serge compares unfavourably the opinions of reactionary historians that merely invoked Kronstadt to discredit the concept of revolution with the legitimate concerns, in relation to personal freedoms, raised by anarchists that cited the same example of Kronstadt to defend the theme of revolution. Serge was adamant that Trotsky still retained residues of this intolerant attitude on the matter of the POUM government during the Spanish Civil War. He also felt that Trotsky overlooked practical questions related to socialism as a goal and an action in his essays. Yet, Serge shared some agreement with Trotsky about the hypocritical nature of conventional morality in religious and intellectual circles and that class struggles rather than individual sentiments shaped the conditions of the civil war. Serge's biographer, Susan Weissman had deemed Their Morals and Ours as "Trotsky at his polemical best in this book, brandishing wit and colourful language" but stated that Trotsky had mistakenly criticised Serge and lumped him with other anti-Leninist and anti-Bolsheviks for which she argued reflected a wider ignorance of Serge's writings.

== See also ==
- List of books by Leon Trotsky
- Marxist ethics
- Secular humanism
