= Siskel/Jacobs Productions =

American documentary production company

- Industry: Motion pictures/Television
- Founded: 2005
- Founder: Jon Siskel and Greg Jacobs
- Headquarters: Chicago, Illinois, U.S.
- Key people: Jon Siskel; Greg Jacobs
- Website: www.siskeljacobs.com

Siskel/Jacobs Productions is a Chicago, Illinois-based documentary and film-production company.

== History ==
Siskel/Jacobs Productions was founded in 2005 by filmmakers Jon Siskel and Greg Jacobs. Siskel is the nephew of film critic Gene Siskel.

== Works ==
The company produced the History Channel special 102 Minutes That Changed America, which premiered on September 11, 2008 and became the second-most watched program in the network's history. The company has also produced a special for Discovery Channel and an episode for the National Geographic Channel's Naked Science series. In 2008, SJP is worked on its first feature documentary, Louder Than a Bomb, which follows four Chicago-area high school poetry teams as they compete in the world's largest youth slam. Recent SJP documentaries include No Small Matter (2019), a film about the importance of early childhood education; The Road Up (2020), a film following four participants in the Chicago job training program Cara as they attempt to find stable employment and escape poverty and oppression; and The Here/Now Project (2024), a film using found footage to chronicle disasters caused by climate change in 2021.
