= Promises of Gold =

2023 poetry collection by José Olivarez

- Author: José Olivarez
- Publisher: Henry Holt and Company
- Publication date: February 14, 2023
- Pages: 320
- ISBN: 978-1250878496
- Preceded by: The Breakbeat Poets Vol. 4: LatiNext

Promises of Gold is a 2023 poetry collection by José Olivarez with a Spanish translation by David Ruano. Published by Henry Holt and Company, it was longlisted for the 2023 National Book Award for Poetry.

== Contents and background ==
Written during the COVID-19 pandemic, the book's poems concern and intertwine themes about immigrant families, capitalism and colonialism, and love, among other themes. In the introductory note to the book, Olivarez wrote that "Promises of Gold is what happens when you try to write a book of love poems for the homies amid a global pandemic that has laid bare all the other pandemics that we’ve been living through all our lives."

The book also includes a Spanish translator's note and translation from Ruano—the translation can be read by flipping the book upside-down and read it starting from the back cover. Olivarez and Ruano had met each other at the Lit & Luz Festival in Chicago and later worked on the translation together. Olivarez got the idea for a bilingual poetry collection while teaching poetry workshops in Los Angeles; he had given his students and their parents copies of his previous poetry collection, Citizens Illegal, to which some parents said they wished they could read Spanish poetry to their children.

In the Chicago Review of Books, Olivarez stated that his understanding of translation, as well as its relationship to empire, stemmed from Don Mee Choi's writing. In Electric Literature, Olivarez shared that the specific format of layering English and Spanish beside one another was borrowed from Roque Salas Rivera's poetry collection, antes que isla es volcan / before island is volcano. Other authors Olivarez found inspirational to the book were Natalie Diaz, Diane Seuss, and Ada Limón.

The book also comes with a Spotify soundtrack.

== Critical reception ==
New York Public Library and USA Today called the book one of the best books of 2023.

In a starred review, Publishers Weekly said that "The poet's sensitive and insightful voice allows these stirring poems to successfully explore the forces acting on love in a complex world, and the unshakable promise of understanding and belonging."

Critics lauded the bilingual structure of the book. The Poetry Foundation saw the translation as "a fascinating aspect of the collection, which works particularly well since Olivarez peppers his own lyrics with Spanish." Newcity Lit said "Olivarez’s poems touch on the fears that we all had during the early stages of the pandemic. The Latinx community, in particular, was heavily affected and suffered so much loss ... The fact that this collection is in Spanish allows me to share his work with my family and I hope that one day we discuss his poems, maybe before we start karaoke and sing Vicente Fernández songs." The Harvard Crimson gave the book five stars and called it "a uniquely bilingual celebration of life and the mundane."

Other critics paid attention to Olivarez's critiques of systems like capitalism and the American Dream. South Side Weekly said "Promises of Gold is a post-pandemic collection through and through—filled with class anxieties and righteous resentment toward the rich and powerful" and saw "There is a blunt anger spinning through the pages—from the promise of upward mobility, what the rich do to be paid first, and learning how to adjust to having money but always feeling the anxiety of money problems." Fauxmoir wrote that "Promises of Gold doesn’t arrive at a shiny final destination where all of the world’s problems have dissipated. It is a collection that is able to recount painful memories, a global pandemic, and a vision for the future because it is centered around relationships."

On the Seawall was generally critical about the book, scrutinizing its "generic and dull" screeds against capitalism among other critiques of certain poems, but found it ultimately "fun": "Even at his worst, Olivarez will never be obscure—never distracted by the need to prove his sophistication. He will never fail to try to entertain. His poems shouldn’t really need a reviewer or critic to explain their appeal. But for those same reasons they may need someone to point out just how much skill and intelligence they actually entail—if, that is, we assume that the value of a poem depends on its intelligence or skill."
