= Marxist ethics =

Doctrine of morality and ethics based on Marxist philosophy

Marxist ethics is a doctrine of morality and ethics that is based on, or derived from, Marxist philosophy. Marx did not directly write about ethical issues and has often been portrayed by subsequent Marxists as a descriptive philosopher rather than a moralist. Despite this, many Marxist theoreticians have sought to develop often conflicting systems of normative ethics based around the principles of historical and dialectical materialism, and Marx's analysis of the capitalist mode of production.

== By school of thought ==
=== Marxism–Leninism ===
The official Soviet interpretation of Marx's writings, Marxism–Leninism, holds that morality, like other forms of ideology, is of a class character and is manifested in people's behavior in different ways throughout different historical conditions in accordance with the interests of what classes or social strata a person occupies.

The main methodological principles of Marxist-Leninist ethics are materialism and dialectics. Marxist–Leninist ethics is materialist: the ideals, standards and virtues prevailing in society are interpreted as a reflection of actually existing interpersonal (value) relations, an expression of interests and requirements of social groups and classes. Morality is not reduced to an ethical ideology that has isolated itself from the world and lays claim to absolute value. Marxist ethics describes morality as a property of one's behavior conditioned by social and historical existence as those moral values that bring together (or force apart) living individuals.

Marxist–Leninist ethics is dialectical: it maintains that like morality as a whole, each of its manifestations, each standard, and virtue, is in perpetual motion, emerging, developing, disappearing, passing from one qualitative state to another. Torn out of the concrete historical process, morality in general simply does not exist. Each type of morality is socially and historically conditioned—this is the fundamental tenet of Marxist ethics. The objective core of morality conveys the character of definite social relations—relations of ownership of the means of production, the interaction of the various classes and social groups and the forms of distribution and exchange. It follows from this that morality has class content. If the nature of social bonds determines the essence of morality (and in a class society these bonds manifest themselves, first and foremost, in the relations between classes), then the morality reflecting them has a class stamp.

Any conception of human rights, to the Marxist-Leninist, are viewed as conceptual constructs granted to the individual by the emergent ideology of the collective. As a result, the Soviet state's treatment of human rights was very different from conceptions prevalent in the West. The state was considered to be the source of human rights, conditionally granted to the individual, whereas Western law claimed the opposite. Therefore, the Soviet legal system regarded law as an arm of politics and courts as agencies of the government. Extensive extra-judiciary powers were given to the Soviet secret police agencies and in practice, there was virtually no separation of powers.

=== Trotskyism ===
A means can be justified only by its end. But the end in turn needs to be justified. From the Marxist point of view, which expresses the historical interests of the proletariat, the end is justified if it leads to increasing the power of man over nature and to the abolition of the power of man over man.

— Trotsky's writings on "The Dialectical Interdependence of Ends and Means".

In 1938, Trotsky had written Their Morals and Ours which consisted of ethical polemics in response to criticisms around his actions concerning the Kronstadt rebellion and wider questions posed around the perceived, "amoral" methods of the Bolsheviks. Critics believed these methods seemed to emulate the Jesuit maxim that the "ends justifies the means". Trotsky argued that Marxism situated the foundation of morality as a product of society to serve social interests rather than "eternal moral truths" proclaimed by institutional religions. On the other hand, he regarded it as farcical to assert that an end could justify any criminal means and viewed this to be a distorted representation of the Jesuit maxim. Instead, Trotsky believed that the means and ends frequently "exchanged places" as when democracy is sought by the working class as an instrument to actualize socialism. He also viewed revolution to be deducible from the laws of the development and primarily the class struggle but this did not mean all means are permissible.

=== Marxist humanism ===
In contrast, adherents of Marxist humanism consider Marxism to be a normative philosophy grounded in a moral sentiment of secular humanism. They reject the positivistic interpretation of Marxism as an objective social science and instead see it as an ideological product of class interest in itself with a motivated goal of human emancipation and reconciliation from alienation. Marxist humanists derive many of the philosophical foundations that they use to orient the human subject's relation to history from the Economic and Philosophic Manuscripts of 1844, which were not published until 1932, well after the canonization of Marx's works by Soviet authorities. These texts provide a critique of capitalism on the basis of its alienating properties from a static conception of human essence. Many humanists also emphasize Marx's doctrine of the unity of theory and practice, and therefore reject the mechanistic determinism of Soviet Marxism, providing a space for human agency in the development of history, and viewing socialist revolution as the "realization of philosophy". For Marxist humanists, Marx articulates a concept of species-being (Gattungswesen), according to which Man's essential nature is that of a free producer, engaging in labor to reproduce his own conditions of life. In capitalist society, and in prior economic arrangements, the freedom of the individual is hindered by wage-labor and emasculating relations of production that can only be overcome by participation in class struggle and eventually, revolution. For humanists, history is the process by which Man acquires more and more control of blind natural forces and produces a humanized natural environment, thus externalizing his inner essence for one another. In a classless society, therefore, ethics thus lose their class-relative nature and broad interests become unified amongst all human beings, therefore producing an ideologically homogenous system of ethics that contributes to maximize human thriving through the principle of reciprocity, as is the immaterial purpose of material liberation.

== Bibliography ==
- Howard Selsam. Socialism and Ethics. New York: International Publishers. 1943.
- Howard Selsam. Ethics and Progress: New Values in a Revolutionary World. New York: International Publishers. 1965.
- Ethics. Ed. by A.I. Titarenko. Translated from the Russian by Natalia Belskaya. Moscow: Progress Publishers, 1989, ISBN 5-01-001098-4.
- Galina Kirilenko and Lydia Korshunova. What Is Personality? Moscow: Progress Publishers. 1989.
- A Dictionary of Ethics. Moscow: Progress Publishers. 1990.
