= Killing of Rekia Boyd =

2012 death via police officer

- Undated photo of Boyd
- Date: March 21, 2012; 14 years ago
- Location: Chicago, Illinois, US
- Type: Homicide, shooting
- Motive: Response to being called a crackhead
- Participants: Dante Servin (shooter)
- Deaths: Rekia Boyd
- Accused: Dante Servin
- Charges: Involuntary manslaughter
- Verdict: Not guilty

Rekia Boyd (November 5, 1989 - March 21, 2012) was a 22-year-old Black American woman who was fatally shot in Chicago, Illinois by Dante Servin, an off-duty Hispanic Chicago police detective, on March 21, 2012.

== Killing ==
Servin, an off-duty police officer, drove his car to Douglass Park on the West Side of Chicago after calling the police to make a noise complaint. He then approached a group of four individuals who had been partying in the park and had some form of verbal altercation with them. One of the victims, Antonio Cross, alleged that he believed Servin was looking for a drug dealer, to which Cross allegedly told Servin to get his "crackhead ass" out of there.

Servin fired on the group, hitting Rekia Boyd in the head, and Antonio Cross in the hand.

"At trial in April 2015, Rekia’s close friend Ikca testified that once Dante Servin began shooting, all who were gathered ran from his bullets. Ikca hid behind a large tree to avoid being shot. She saw Rekia on the ground injured and dying. Ikca was prevented from riding with Rekia in the ambulance. In fact, the police at the scene threatened to arrest her if she didn’t leave. Ikca told the judge that Rekia hated to be alone."

Initially, the Chicago police department claimed that Servin had discharged his weapon after Cross had approached him with a gun.The Boyd family quickly responded that the object was in fact a cell phone. No weapon was ever recovered from the scene.

== Aftermath ==
On April 5, 2012, Boyd’s family filed a lawsuit against Chicago. The lawsuit was settled in March 2013. In November 2013, Servin was charged with involuntary manslaughter, he requested a bench trial. This was the first time in 17 years that criminal charges were filed against an off-duty cop in Cook County, IL. The last such case occurred in 1995, when Gregory Becker was charged and later convicted of killing Joseph Gould. Servin was cleared on April 20, 2015 by Judge Dennis J. Porter in a rare directed verdict. Porter's reasoning was that since the shooting was intentional, Servin could not be charged with recklessness. "It is intentional and the crime, if any there be, is first-degree murder," said Porter in his ruling. Following this ruling, Servin could not be charged with murder due to double jeopardy protections. Servin claimed he fired because someone in the group was holding a gun, but it was actually only a cellphone.

Following the April ruling, Chicago-based organizers met and planned a number of actions through the Spring and Summer of 2015 to ensure "that Rekia would not be forgotten and that her family would not be abandoned." Black Youth Project 100 (BYP100) organized a rally at a Chicago Police Board meeting in August 2015, effectively shutting the meeting down early in response to cavalier treatment of Boyd's bereaved brother,Martinez Sutton.

In November 2015, Chicago Mayor Rahm Emanuel and police superintendent Garry McCarthy both suggested that Dante Servin should be fired by the Chicago Police Board. The city paid $4.5 million to Boyd's family to settle a wrongful-death lawsuit.

Servin resigned on May 17, 2016, two days before the departmental hearing which was to decide whether he should be fired.

In November 2019, Servin requested that the case be expunged from his record. The request was denied by a judge, as was a subsequent request to seal the case's records.

== Protests ==
The ruling sparked some public protest. The Black Lives Matter movement has protested the deaths of black girls and women at the hands of police, including Boyd's.

List of Chicago-based groups that led actions to support Boyd's family and fight against gendered and racialized violence:

- BYP100
  - Organized a National Day of Action for Black Women and Girls, 5/21/2015.
  - Attended and rallied at Chicago Police Board meetings as part of the #FireDanteServin campaign.
- Project NIA
  - Co-organized with the Taskforce. “A Legal Teach-in for Rekia Boyd," held on 4/29/2015 at DePaul Law School by the school's chapter of the National Lawyers Guild (NLG). Other co-sponsors included Chicago’s NLG chapter, TUPOCC, Peoples Law Office, Black Lives Matter Chicago, We Charge Genocide, Uptown People’s Law Center, and the Lawndale Christian Legal Center. Organizers reported harassment by school officials and the Chicago Police Department, who surrounded the building in which the event was held with dozens of officers and utilized surveillance equipment. The event drew close to 200 participants.
  - Co-ordinated a month-long event series, "Black August Chicago - Black Women and State Violence." The Facebook event invite listed thirteen separate events, including speak-outs, discussions, workshops, rallies, and letter-writing to incarcerated Black women.
- BLM Chicago
- WAPB
- Feminist Uprising to Resist Inequality and Exploitation (FURIE)
- International Socialist Organization (ISO)
- We Charge Genocide
  - Attended police board meetings
- Chicago Taskforce on Violence against Girls & Young Women

== Legacy ==
A Long Walk Home, an arts organization promoting an end to violence against Black girls and women, is leading the Rekia Boyd Monument Project. Other partners include Chicago's Department of Cultural Affairs and Special Events (DCASE), Chicago Parks District, and Monument Lab, a part of the Chicago Monuments Project. Renderings of the finalist proposals were displayed at a party that marked what would have been Boyd's 36th birthday in November of 2025. With funding from DCASE and the Andrew W. Mellon Foundation, the monument is slated to be erected in 2026-27.

== See also ==
- List of unarmed African Americans killed by law enforcement officers in the United States
