= Kevin Coval =

American poet

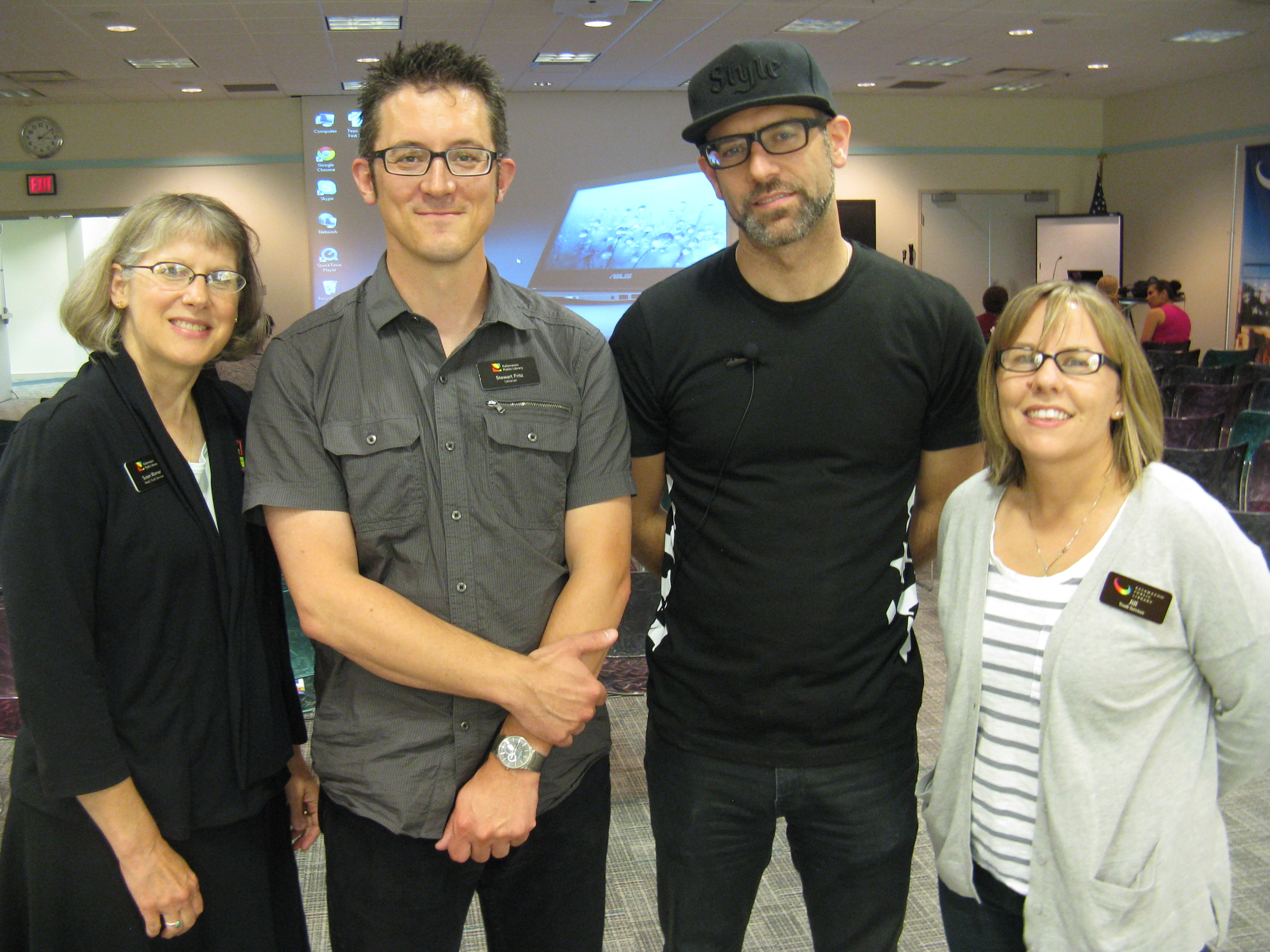
- Coval (with cap) at the Kalamazoo Public Library
- Education: Glenbrook North High School
- Alma mater: Ohio University
- Occupations: Poet, playwright, writer

Kevin Coval is an American poet. Coval is a Chicago-based writer who is known for exploring topics such as race, hip-hop culture, Chicago history, and Jewish-American identity in his work. He is also known for his appearances in four seasons of the Peabody Award-winning television series Def Poetry Jam on HBO.

== Education ==
Coval attended Glenbrook North High School, graduating in 1993. After high school, Coval attended Ohio University, briefly studying abroad at Swansea University before he left to play semi-pro basketball in Wales.

== Career ==
In 1996, Coval returned to Chicago and began working different jobs to pay rent, including as a furniture delivery man, caterer, and waiter. He also began performing his poetry at open mics around the city.

In 1997, Coval became a regular at open mics at the Alt-X bookstore. He went on to perform at venues such as Mad Bar, Estelle's, and the Green Mill Cocktail Lounge.

Coval was named artistic director of Young Chicago Authors, an organization that sends professional writers to schools to teach, in 1999.

In 2001, Coval co-founded the youth performance-poetry competition Louder Than a Bomb with Anna West. By 2017, the competition was considered the largest youth performance-poetry competition in the world.

Coval also appeared in an episode of the HBO series Def Poetry Jam that was broadcast in January 2002, in which he performed his poem "Family Feud". After the first airing of the episode, Coval was contacted by an agent and went on a college tour, becoming a full-time professional poet. He went on to appear in three more episodes of the series and eventually served as one of the show's creative consultants, scouting for local poets to appear on the show.

Coval was interviewed by Trevor Noah on an episode of The Daily Show with Trevor Noah that aired in 2017.

Coval co-wrote the play This Is Modern Art, which premiered at the Steppenwolf Theatre for Young Adults in Chicago in February 2015. The play was also performed off-Broadway at the Fourth Street Theater in Manhattan in 2018.

Coval produced the segment "Word on the Street" for the local talk show Windy City Live, which was nominated for a Chicago/Midwest Emmy Award in 2020.

Coval was removed from his position as artistic director at Young Chicago Authors in 2021.

Coval has written for publications and outlets such as CNN, Rock the Bells, Slam, Sarasota Magazine, and Interfaith America Magazine.

== Poetry ==
Coval published his first poetry book, Slingshots: A Hip-Hop Poetica, in 2002. Slingshots is a semi-autobiographical poetic memoir.

His second poetry book, Everyday People, was published in 2008.

Coval released the poetic novella L-Vis Lives! RaceMusic Poems in 2011. The poems in the book form a narrative about a character named "L-Vis", and examine race, music, and the appropriation of hip-hop culture, while referencing figures such as Elvis Presley, Eminem, and Rick Rubin.

Coval published the poetry collection Schtick in 2013. Schtick centered on themes of Jewish identity.

Coval served as one of the editors of the poetry anthology The Breakbeat Poets: New American Poetry in the Age of Hip-Hop, which was published in 2015.

His 2017 collection A People's History of Chicago, the title of which is inspired by Howard Zinn's A People's History of the United States, comments in 77 poems, one for each neighborhood in Chicago, on the city, its history, and the people that live in it, from its Native American beginnings and its appropriation by whites to the present day, the inauguration of Rahm Emanuel and the World Series win by the Chicago Cubs. Along the way, he comments on Robert de LaSalle's mispronunciation of the Native American word "checagou", which he bastardizes with his "misshapen mouth", erasing its original history. A People's History of Chicago was a finalist for the 2017 Chicago Review of Books Award for Poetry.

In 2019, Coval published the poetry collection Everything Must Go: Life and Death of an American Neighborhood, which examined the topic of gentrification in Wicker Park, Chicago and featured illustrations from Langston Allston. The collection was a finalist for the 2019 Chicago Review of Books Award for Poetry.

Coval edited the poetry anthology The End of Chiraq: A Literary Mixtape, which was published in 2018.

Coval has also published poems in several anthologies, including Born to Use Mics: Reading Nas's Illmatic, Total Chaos: The Art and Aesthetics of Hip-Hop, The Spoken Word Revolution: Slam, Hip-Hop, & the Poetry of a New Generation, and The Spoken Word Revolution Redux.

== Awards ==
- 2015: Lannan Foundation Marfa Writers Residency
- 2017: John Peter Altgeld Freedom of Speech Award
- 2018: Studs Terkel Award
- 2018: Webby Nom for Best Music Documentary for Red Bull's "This and Nothing Else"
- 2019: Gwendolyn Brooks Award
