= Camonghne Felix =

American writer and poet

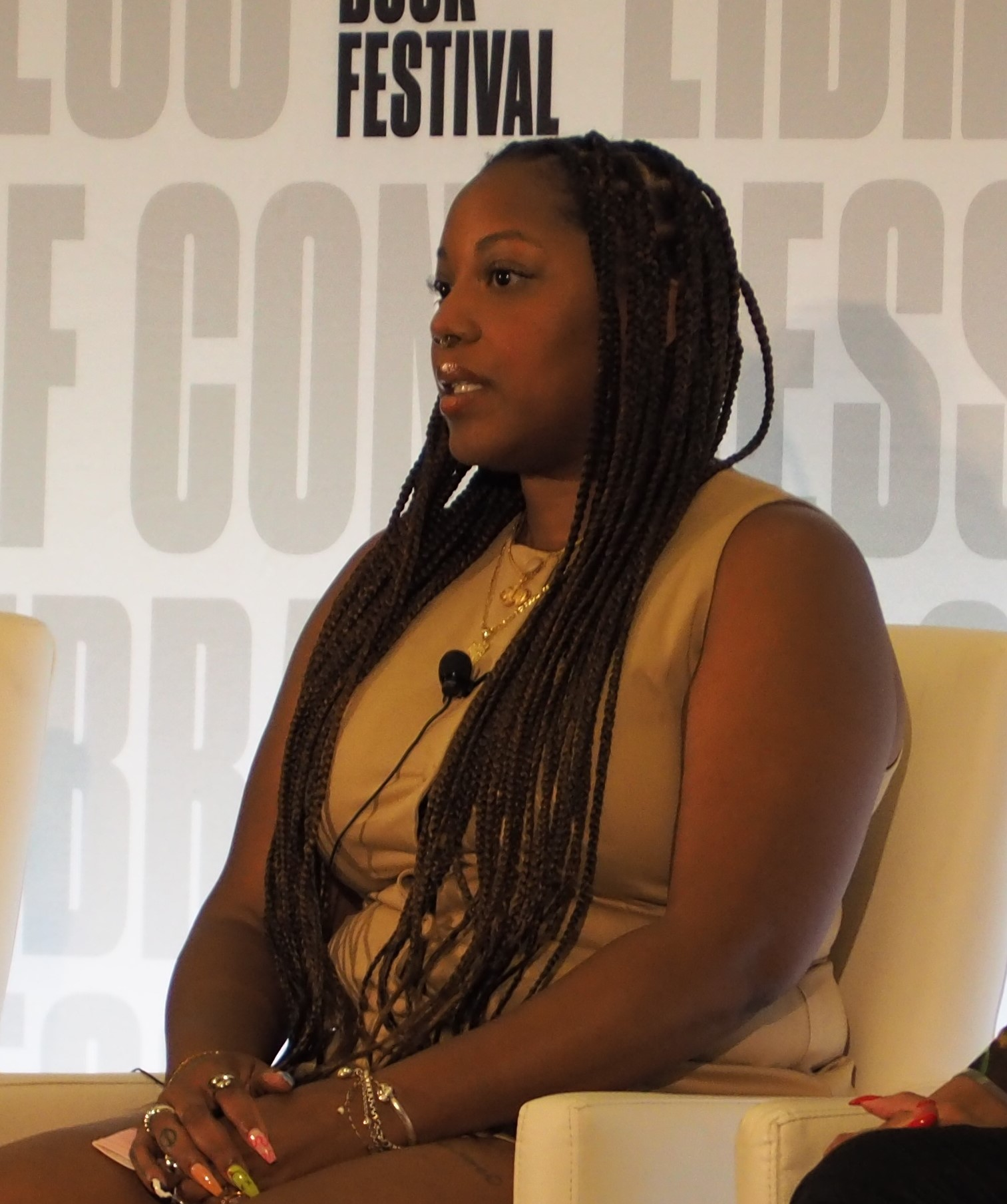
- Felix at the 2024 National Book Festival
- Born: 1992 (age 33–34); The Bronx, New York City, U.S.
- Education: Bard College (MFA)
- Occupations: poet; writer; communications strategist; academic
- Employer: The New School
- Writing career
- Notable work: Build Yourself a Boat

Camonghne Felix (pronounced /kəmoʊn/ kuh-MOHN; born 1992) is an American writer, poet, and communications strategist. Her debut poetry collection, Build Yourself a Boat, was longlisted for the 2019 National Book Award. Felix is a professor of writing at The New School.

== Career ==
=== Poetry ===
Felix received her MFA from Bard College and was mentored by Mahogany L. Browne.

Felix participated in the national poetry slam Brave New Voices and was featured in the festival's 2010 HBO series. She published her first chapbook, Yolk, in 2015. Her poetry was included in the 2018 anthology The Breakbeat Poets Volume 2: Black Girl Magic.

Felix's debut poetry collection, Build Yourself a Boat, was released in April 2019 by Haymarket Books. The poems cover topics such as sexual assault, abortion, and politics. Ian Hogdson of South Side Weekly described it as "an impressive first collection."

Glamour featured a poem Felix wrote and performed in honor of Breonna Taylor in the magazine's 2020 Women of the Year film.

=== Communications work ===
Felix worked as the head of racial justice initiatives at DoSomething in 2015. According to The Verge, she was fired after a meeting in which she suggested that the organization invest in Black communities after the murders of the Charleston Nine.

Felix previously worked as a senior manager of communications at Ms.. In 2019, she was the communications director for the campaign of Chicago mayoral candidate Amara Enyia. The following year, she was hired as director of surrogates and strategic communications for Elizabeth Warren's 2020 presidential campaign. In 2020, she was a vice president of communications at Blue State, a digital strategy firm.

== Personal life ==
Felix was raised in The Bronx, New York. She is queer.

== Awards ==
=== Literary awards ===
Year	Title	Award	Category	Result	Ref.
2019	Build Yourself a Boat	National Book Award	Poetry	Longlisted	
2020	Build Yourself a Boat	Lambda Literary Awards	Bisexual Poetry	Finalist	
2020	Build Yourself a Boat	PEN Open Book Award	—	Finalist	

=== Other honors ===
- 2019: Out 100
- 2020: Women of the Year honoree, Glamour

== Bibliography ==
=== Books ===
Type	Title	Year	Publisher	Identifier
Novels	Dyscalculia: A Love Story of Epic Miscalculation	2023	Penguin Random House	Hardcover: ISBN 978-0593242179
Poetry	Build Yourself a Boat	2019	Haymarket Books	Paperback: ISBN 978-1608466115; Hardcover: ISBN 978-1608466160
Chapbooks	Yolk	2010	Penmanship Books	
