= Sopan Deb =

American journalist

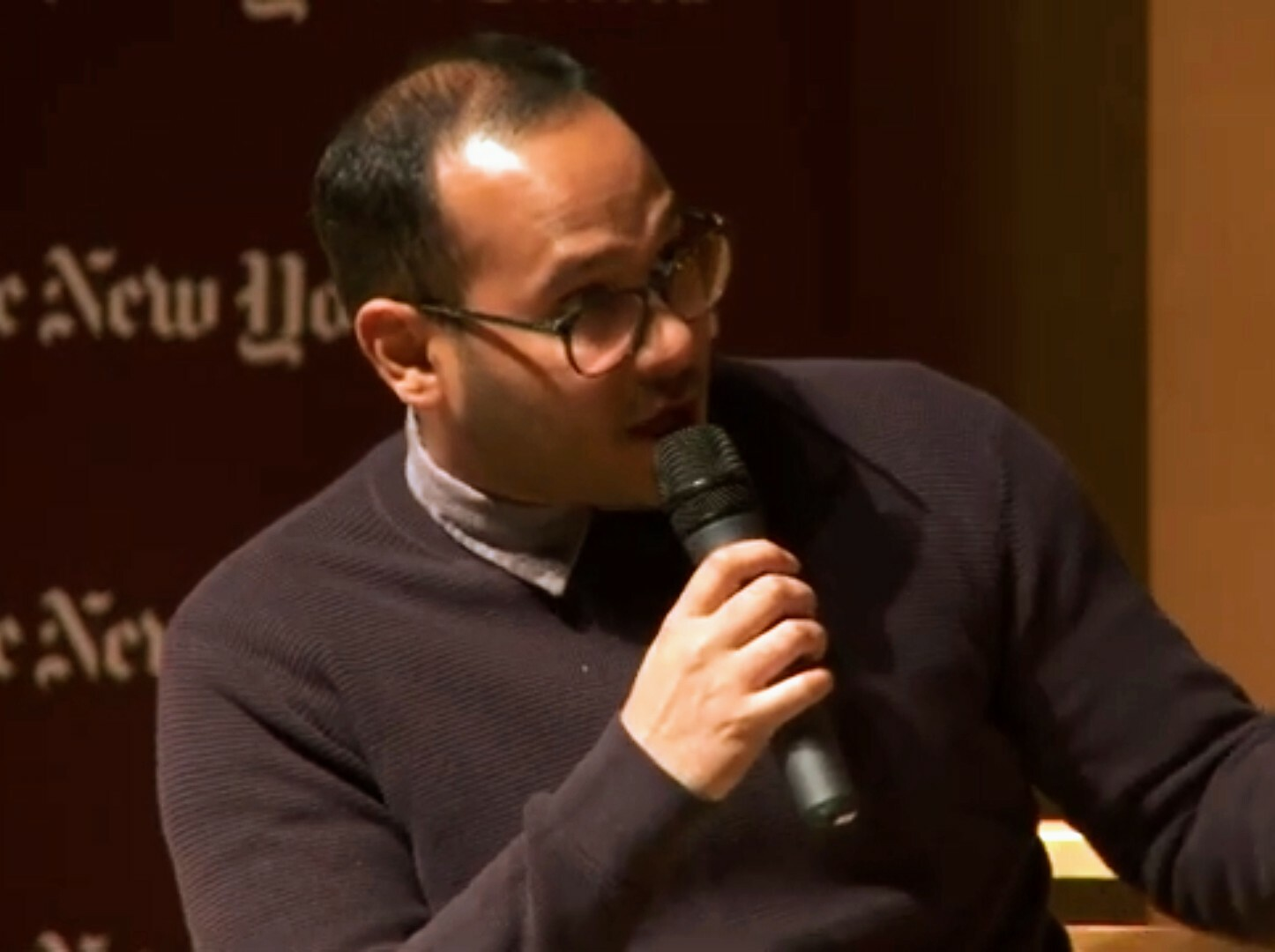
- Born: March 15, 1988 (age 38); Massachusetts, U.S.
- Education: Boston University
- Occupation: Journalist
- Years active: 2009–present

Sopan Deb (born March 15, 1988) is an American journalist who works as a culture reporter for The New York Times.

== Early life ==
Deb was born March 15, 1988 in Massachusetts to a Hindu Indian family of Bengali origin. His family moved to New Jersey when he was 3 years old. Raised in Howell Township, New Jersey, he attended Howell High School, where he was one of three students selected to make daily announcements. In 2010, he graduated from Boston University with a degree in broadcast journalism.

== Career ==
Deb's first job was as a reporter for State House News Service in Massachusetts. Over the years, he has worked at The Boston Globe, NBC News and Al Jazeera. In 2015, he began working for CBS News where he covered the campaigns of Marco Rubio, Lindsey Graham, Rand Paul and Donald Trump. While covering a March 2016 presidential campaign rally for Trump at the University of Illinois at Chicago (which Trump ultimately cancelled in face of large protests), Deb was arrested by police and charged with resisting arrest. Police dropped the charges after footage aired depicting the incident, showing Deb had not resisted arrest.

In 2017, Deb began working as a cultural reporter for The New York Times. In 2018, he interviewed the cast of Arrested Development; during the interview, actress Jessica Walter claimed that costar Jeffrey Tambor had verbally abused her during filming.

Deb has also worked as a stand-up comedian. He appeared as a guest on The Special Without Brett Davis in 2018.

== Awards ==
- 2011 - Edward R. Murrow Award for best documentary for Bill Russell: Larger Than Life
- 2016 - Named as one of the 16 Breakout Media Stars of 2016 by Politico

== Personal life ==
Deb lives in New York City. As of 2022, he is married .

== Works ==
- Missed Translations: Meeting the Immigrant Parents Who Raised Me Dey Street Books, 2020. ISBN 9780062936769
