= College Students for Bernie =

Supporters of Bernie Sanders

College Students For Bernie
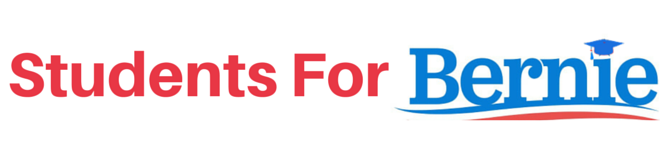
- Logo of College Students for Bernie

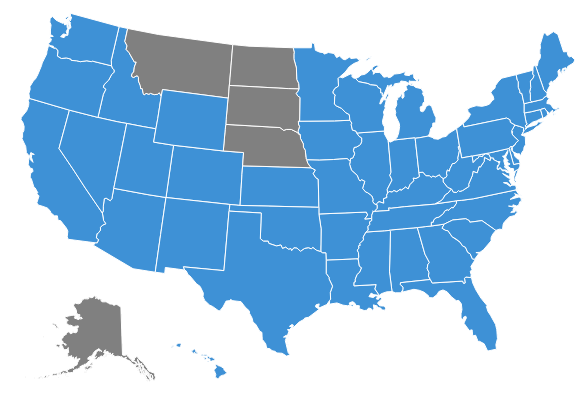
- States with Registered Chapters (In Blue).
- Abbreviation: CSFB
- Successor: Young Progressives Demanding Action
- Formation: 1 April 2015; 11 years ago
- Dissolved: 1 December 2016; 9 years ago
- Type: Political organization
- Legal status: Dissolved
- Purpose: Campaign, Education
- Location: United States
- Members: 260+ Chapters
- Website: collegestudentsforbernie.org

College Students for Bernie (CSFB) was a grassroots organization dedicated to increase young voter participation, enhance progressive politics, and support Bernie Sanders' 2016 presidential bid. At the organization's peak during the 2016 United States presidential election, there were over 200 chapters (with the exact numbers being around 260) in universities across the United States.

The group was founded in April 2015 and did most of their organizing online through social media. The executive board and their founders consisted of students from various universities across the country (see Founding section).

In the aftermath of the 2016 election, the organization split into two different organizations, the existing group Young Democratic Socialists of America, and a new organization founded by College Students for Bernie members, Young Progressives Demanding Action, a subgroup of Progressive Democrats of America.

== Formation ==
College Students for Bernie was founded by Elizabeth Siyuan Lee and Nathan Rifkin., as well as Alex Forgue at Northern Illinois University, and Benjamin Packer at Dartmouth College. After coming up with the "chapter model", where each college would have their own chapter under a larger network of progressive college students, they reached out to their peers to help establish chapters at Middlebury and other colleges across the United States.

After they worked with progressive students in other colleges to establish around 30 chapters, College Students for Bernie was featured on the front page of the Daily Kos.

== Activities ==
=== National organization ===
During the Democratic National Convention, the group endorsed the "People's Convention", a separate convention that was designed to create an open space for people to come together and create a progressive platform by the "people and for the people."

College Students for Bernie teamed up with Young Democratic Socialists to co-sponsor a conference called "From Sanders to the Grassroots." The conference took place from 5 to 7 August (2016) at the National 4-H Conference Center.

On 11 March, College Students for Bernie members took part in the 2016 Donald Trump Chicago rally protest organized by students at the University of Illinois at Chicago (UIC).

=== Individual chapters ===
Campaign activities among chapters varied. These activities included phone banking, car pooling students to voting locations, or registering students to vote.

At Austin Community College District, the Students For Bernie group there filed a lawsuit after the college refused to allow them to campaign on campus.

== Beyond the 2016 election ==
After the 2016 election as well as the Democratic Primary elections of 2016, College Students for Bernie encouraged its members to change its chapters into a new group, Young Progressives Demanding Action (YPDA), which was founded by those who were active in the founding of College Students For Bernie. Young Progressives Demanding Action, is a subgroup of Progressive Democrats of America (PDA). Other members and founding members encouraged chapters to merge into a Young Democratic Socialists of America Chapter.

Other activists groups such as UCSB Activist Network grew out of UCSB for Bernie at the University of California, Santa Barbara. Pitts Progressives at the University of Pittsburgh grew out of the Students for Bernie chapter there.

After the Democratic Party presidential primaries, 2016, the group never officially endorsed Clinton due to the mixed feelings felt by college students.

=== Young Progressives Demanding Action ===
By Fall of 2016, there were 15 registered-YPDA chapters.

YPDA groups such as YPDA Hawaii organized protests against Donald Trump.
