= Willie Perdomo =

American poet, children's book author, and educator (born 1967)

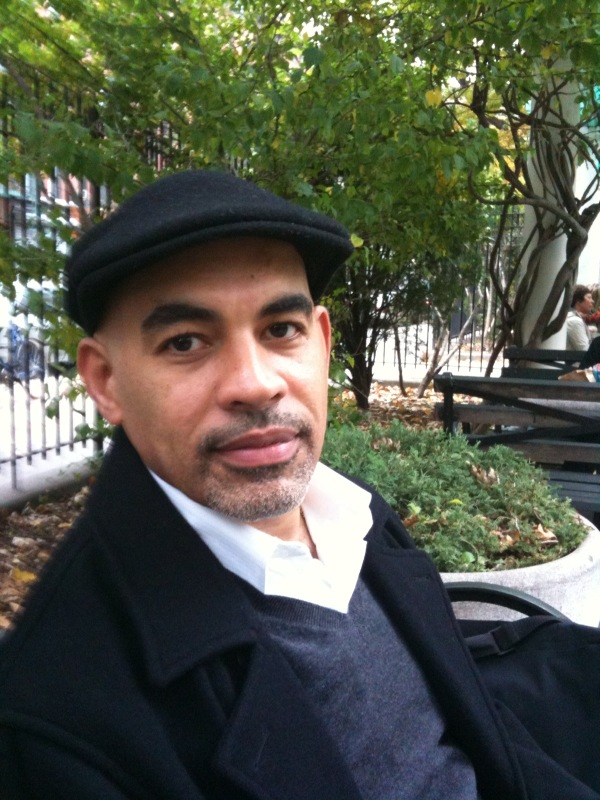
- Born: 1967 (age 58–59); New York City, U.S.
- Education: Long Island University Brooklyn (MFA)
- Occupations: poet; children's book author; educator
- Writing career
- Notable works: Smoking Lovely; The Essential Hits of Shorty Bon Bon; Visiting Langston
- Notable awards: PEN/Open Book Award

Willie Perdomo (born 1967) is an American poet, children's book author, and educator from New York City. He is the author of five poetry collections and two children's books. His poetry collection Smoking Lovely (2003) received the PEN/Beyond Margins Award, now known as the PEN/Open Book Award.

== Life and career ==
Perdomo was raised in East Harlem. He received an MFA from Long Island University Brooklyn. He teaches English at Phillips Exeter Academy.

In 2021, Perdomo was appointed New York State Poet. In 2023, he received an Academy of American Poets Laureate Fellowship for a project titled A New York State of Poetry. He also received the Foundation for Contemporary Arts' Cy Twombly Award for Poetry in 2021.

== Works ==
The Essential Hits of Shorty Bon Bon was a finalist for the National Book Critics Circle Award for poetry, and Visiting Langston received a Coretta Scott King Honor.

Perdomo's books have also received review coverage in publications including Publishers Weekly, The New Yorker, 4Columns, and Kirkus Reviews.

=== Poetry ===
- Where a Nickel Costs a Dime. W. W. Norton & Company, 1996.
- Smoking Lovely. Rattapallax Press, 2003.
- The Essential Hits of Shorty Bon Bon. Penguin Books, 2014.
- The Crazy Bunch. Penguin Books, 2019.
- Smoking Lovely: The Remix. Haymarket Books, 2021.

=== Children's books ===
- Visiting Langston. Illustrated by Bryan Collier, 2001.
- Clemente!. Illustrated by Bryan Collier, 2010.
