= Robert Boone =

American writer

- Born: Winnetka, Illinois, U.S.
- Education: Columbia University
- Occupations: Author, creative writing teacher
- Writing career
- Language: English
- Genres: Textbooks, non-fiction

Robert Boone is an author and creative writing teacher. He is the founder of Young Chicago Authors, founded in 1991 with the mission of encouraging teenagers to write. The program now serves more than 5000 teens a year. In 2009 he was hosted in the White House by First Lady Michelle Obama, where he accepted an award from the Coming Up Taller Leadership Enhancement Conference on behalf of Young Chicago Authors.

== Background ==
Robert Boone grew up in Winnetka, Illinois, and also spent some of his formative teaching years in Germany. He graduated from Northwestern University's School of Education and Social Policy in 1975 and earned a master's degree at Columbia University.

== Career ==
Throughout his career he focused on developing the writing skills of students who are often underserved by traditional education. For example, he has worked closely with Athletes for Better Education throughout his career. and the inner-city children of the Cabrini-Green housing project.

== Written work ==
He is the author of several books and textbooks including, "Moe's Cafe," "Forest High," and Inside Job: A Life of Teaching. The Chicago Tribune praises it as a "charming, passionate and wonderfully written book" and describes Boone as "the kind of teacher whom students—and parents—dream of."

== Awards ==
In 2002, Boone was named Chicagoan of the Year by Chicago magazine.
