= International Socialist Review (1956) =

The International Socialist Review was a Trotskyist publication produced by the Socialist Workers Party of the United States from 1956 to 1975 in magazine format, and until the 1990s as a supplement to the organization's weekly newspaper, The Militant. This publication succeeded the organization's theoretical magazine, Fourth International. In later years it was financed by the Center for Economic Research and Social Change (CERSC) based in Chicago. International Socialist Review was last published in May 2019.
