= Louder Than a Bomb (film) =

- Theatrical release poster
- Directed by: Greg Jacobs; Jon Siskel
- Produced by: Greg Jacobs; Jon Siskel
- Cinematography: Stephan Mazurek
- Edited by: John Farbrother
- Production company: Siskel/Jacobs Productions
- Release date: July 30, 2010
- Running time: 99 minutes
- Country: United States
- Language: English

Louder Than a Bomb is a 2010 American documentary film about Louder Than a Bomb, an annual youth poetry slam in Chicago. The film was directed and produced by Greg Jacobs and Jon Siskel. It follows the stories of several high school teams and individuals leading up to Louder Than a Bomb 2008 and their experiences at the slam. It opened theatrically in New York City on July 30, 2010 and opened in Los Angeles on August 6, 2010 at the 14th Annual DocuWeeks.
