= Louder Than a Bomb =

Annual youth poetry slam in Chicago, US

Rooted & Radical Youth Poetry Festival (formerly named Louder Than a Bomb) is an annual youth poetry slam in Chicago every spring. Founded in 2001 by Kevin Coval and Anna West of the nonprofit organization Young Chicago Authors. It is now the largest youth slam in the world with over 1,000 teams competing in 2014. The goal of the slam is to get diverse youth from all around the Chicago area to not only share their stories, but listen to the voices of those from other parts of the city they would otherwise never hear. Participants range in age from middle school to college, with the majority in the high school age bracket. The competing high school slam teams present four individual poems and one group piece performed by four people. Each team competes in two preliminary bouts. Four teams compete each bout. The top 16 go onto semifinals and the top 4 go onto finals. The name of the slam comes from the Public Enemy song of the same name. In 2010 the poetry slam competition was the subject of a documentary. As of 2021, the poetry slam has postponed in-person programming.
