= BYP100 =

African American youth organization in the US

Black Youth Project 100
- Abbreviation: BYP100
- Formation: 2013; 13 years ago
- Founder: Cathy Cohen; Charlene Carruthers
- Type: Nonprofit, social justice
- National Director: D'Atra "Dee Dee" Jackson
- Affiliations: Movement for Black Lives (M4BL)

Black Youth Project 100 (BYP100) is an African American youth organization in the United States. Its activities include community organizing, voter mobilization, and other social justice campaigns focused on black, feminist, and queer issues. The national director is D'Atra "Dee Dee" Jackson.

BYP100 was founded in 2013, and was motivated by the response to the acquittal of George Zimmerman in his trial for the killing of Trayvon Martin. Founding members include Charlene Carruthers.

As of 2019, the group has chapters in Chicago, New York City, the District of Columbia, New Orleans, Detroit, Atlanta, Milwaukee, Durham, and Jackson.

== History ==
The group's origins begin with the Black Youth Project, a project set up by black activist and feminist Cathy Cohen, a political scientist at the University of Chicago. Cohen created an online hub to study African American millennials with the goal of empowering them. In 2013, Cohen met Charlene Carruthers, then a youth activist in Chicago, and the group was created that summer.

== Views and membership ==
BYP100's membership is limited to those between 18 and 35. In Chicago, many are students, while "others are artists, poets, service workers, media makers, and musicians." Many of the organization's leaders and members are queer women.

The organization's national co-director in 2019 described its focus on black, feminist, and queer issues as "radically inclusive and vigilant about bringing folks from the margins to the center." A profile in Chicago Magazine described the group as "decidedly radical," noting "In the short term, they want an elected group to replace the appointed Chicago Police Board, but in the long term, they advocate the outright abolition of the police department and the prison system. Among their other goals: reparations, universal childcare, a higher minimum wage, the decriminalization of marijuana, and the repeal of other laws that disproportionately land black youths in the criminal justice system."

Cohen, writing an op-ed in the Washington Post with political theorist Danielle Allen, described the group's goals as organizing "against state violence directed at black youth." Cohen and Allen write:

BYP100 promotes a leadership model at odds with the male charismatic leader made famous by Malcolm X and King. These activists also look to black feminism and "queer" political analysis, again focusing on multiple forms of marginalization, to guide their organization and campaigns. They underscore that the civil rights movement, too, was built with the strength of women and queer activists (think Ella Baker and Bayard Rustin), not merely charismatic, heterosexual men.

=== Prominent members ===
- Nnennaya Amuchie
- Charlene Carruthers
- Malcolm London
- Asha Rosa Ransby-Sporn

== Activities ==
In September 2014, BYP100 released Agenda to Keep Us Safe, a policy document called for the "demilitarization" of law enforcement, the creation of civilian review boards to address accusations of police misconduct, an end to the war on drugs, requirements for police to wear body cameras, and the increase in the enforcement of existing civil rights laws.

In December 2014, BYP100 members were among the organizers of a series of traffic disruption protests in Washington, D.C., in support of protesters in Ferguson, Missouri.

They worked closely with Chicago Black Lives Matter to defeat the reelection bid of Cook County State's Attorney Anita Alvarez, who had waited 13 months to prosecute the police officer who murdered Laquan McDonald.

In April 2015, BYP100 activists criticized D.C. Mayor Muriel E. Bowser for detailing 34 Metropolitan Police Department officers to Maryland to assist in responding to civil disturbances in Baltimore in accordance with the Emergency Management Assistance Compact. The group called upon Bowser to recall the officers.

On Martin Luther King Jr. Day in January 2016, the organization launched their Black economic justice policy platform, the Agenda to Build Black Futures with a series of actions and events around the country under the banner of the hashtag #reclaimMLK. The group described the campaign as inspired by King's Poor People's Campaign. The platform called for "a workers' bill of rights, divesting from for-profit prisons, accountability and redress for predatory lending from banks, and reparations to address the disproportionate system-wide impact of slavery on black lives, among other measures."

== Influence ==
Since it started, BYP100 has had a real impact on how Black youth organize and show up politically across the United States. Reporting from The Black Youth Project explains that the group changed a lot of the activist energy in Chicago by pushing direct action, building up young Black leaders, and taking on issues like policing, incarceration, and racial justice. Beyond Chicago, BYP100 shaped the wider movement by openly grounding its work in a Black queer feminist framework, a point the organization highlights in its own platform.

They also put forward policy ideas of their own, including the “Agenda to Build Black Futures,” which has been shared in different national organizing spaces. That document focuses on community investment, abolitionist thinking, and economic justice. As part of the Movement for Black Lives (M4BL), BYP100 has influenced national conversations about state violence, transformative justice, and what it means to center young Black people in movement work.

Its approach has informed and overlapped with other Chicago-based Black feminist groups, including Assata’s Daughters, who credit BYP100 with helping legitimize Black-only organizing spaces. In internal reports, the organization documents leadership development initiatives and international political education efforts such as a delegation to Cuba that reflect its broader ideological commitments and contributions to movement strategy.

=== Prominent members ===
- Nnennaya Amuchie
- Charlene Carruthers
- Malcolm London
- Asha Rosa Ransby-Sporn
- Darializa Avila Chevalier
