= Haymarket Books =

American Chicago-based non-profit publisher of books about socialism

- Parent company: Center for Economic Research and Social Change
- Status: Active
- Founded: 2001
- Country of origin: United States
- Headquarters location: Haymarket House; 800 W. Buena Avenue; Chicago, Illinois, U.S.
- Distribution: Consortium Book Sales & Distribution
- Key people: Anthony Arnove; Ahmed Shawki; Julie Fain
- Publication types: Books
- Nonfiction topics: Socialism
- Official website: Official website

Haymarket Books is an American nonprofit independent book publisher and distributor based in Chicago, Illinois, specializing in titles on left-wing politics and social justice, and the publishing arm of the International Socialist Organization before its dissolution. The press has been included in Publishers Weekly's annual list of fast-growing independent publishers.

Several Haymarket titles have received national literary attention, including Naomi Klein's No Is Not Enough, longlisted for the 2017 National Book Award for Nonfiction, and Camonghne Felix's Build Yourself a Boat, longlisted for the 2019 National Book Award for Poetry.

== History ==
The name of the publishing house refers to the Chicago 1886 Haymarket affair, a pro-labor and anti-police protest that ended in a bombing, gunfire by police, and the wrongful conviction of eight anarchist labor organizers for the death of an officer. Four of the falsely accused were executed by the state.

Haymarket Books was founded in 2001 by Anthony Arnove, Ahmed Shawki, and Julie Fain, all of whom had previously worked at the International Socialist Review. Its first title was The Struggle for Palestine, a collection of essays by pro-Palestinian activists including Edward Said. Fain said the press aimed "to be a socialist workplace in a capitalist world".

Both Haymarket Books and the International Socialist Review are owned by the nonprofit Center for Economic Research and Social Change and were considered the "publishing arm" of the International Socialist Organization (ISO). The ISO was a Trotskyist political party founded in 1977 and considered "the largest revolutionary socialist organization" in the US by 2017, until its eventual dissolution amid controversy in 2019. At that time, Haymarket Books issued a statement of support, signed by Arnove and Fain among others, declaring "We stand with and believe survivors," as well as confidence in the newly reconstituted board of the CERSC, after the removal of members involved in the mishandling of a 2013 rape accusation by ISO leadership.

Haymarket was cited by Publishers Weekly on its list of fast-growing independent publishers in 2017 and 2018. A 2016 Publishers Weekly profile said the press had approximately 520 titles in print and published 20 to 25 titles each season.

Haymarket Books is the publishing and distribution arm of the Center for Economic Research and Social Change (CERSC). According to ProPublica's Nonprofit Explorer, the Center for Economic Research and Social Change reported $8.53 million in revenue and $17.4 million in total assets for fiscal year 2024.

=== Haymarket House ===
In 2017, Haymarket announced plans to move into a historic mansion at 800 W. Buena Avenue in Chicago's Buena Park neighborhood. The Lannan Foundation gave a grant of $2.3 million to the CERSC toward the purchase of the building. The move drew opposition from some local residents before the press received the permits needed for the property. Coverage said the building would be used for office space as well as community gatherings and public events. By 2022, Haymarket House was hosting events, and in 2024, Chicago Review of Books described Haymarket House as the press's space for political, cultural, literary, and community events.

== Programs ==
=== Socialism Conference ===
Haymarket Books organizes the annual Socialism Conference, held in Chicago. The Nation reported that the conference began in 2002 and was for many years primarily organized by the International Socialist Organization, with Haymarket serving as a cosponsor from the mid-2000s. Haymarket organized the conference for the first time in 2019, alongside Jacobin, and the conference book fair—previously a smaller part of the event—expanded significantly under Haymarket's stewardship. In its coverage of the 2022 conference, The Nation described the event as a four-day gathering backed by about 40 left-wing groups and publications, and as a forum where a younger generation of organizers debated strategy and coalition-building on the American left; more than 1,700 people attended in person and another 1,600 bought virtual tickets.

=== Writing Freedom Fellowship ===
In 2023, Haymarket launched the Writing Freedom Fellowship, a program for poets, fiction writers, and creative nonfiction writers who are incarcerated or otherwise affected by the criminal legal system. The fellowship selects 20 writers annually and provides them with unrestricted awards and mentorship. The inaugural fellows were announced in 2024, and a third cohort was announced in 2026. According to the Mellon Foundation, the fellowship is administered by Haymarket with support from Mellon and the Art for Justice Fund, and was expanded in 2025 with a goal of supporting 100 writers over five years.

=== Books Not Bars ===
In 2021, Haymarket launched Books Not Bars, a program that sends free books to incarcerated readers. It was reported that the initiative grew out of staff efforts to respond to letters from incarcerated readers and, by 2025, was receiving about 50 requests a week.

== Publications ==
Haymarket Books has been described as publishing "provocative books from the left end of the political spectrum". Its catalogue includes works in politics, history, sociology, literary criticism, poetry, and fiction.

=== Authors ===
Haymarket has published work by authors including Naomi Klein, Angela Davis, Arundhati Roy, Rebecca Solnit, Howard Zinn, Noam Chomsky, Dave Zirin, Eve L. Ewing, Keeanga-Yamahtta Taylor, and Mohammed el-Kurd.

=== Selected publications ===
In 2005, Haymarket published Dave Zirin's What's My Name, Fool?, a collection of essays on the relationship between sports and politics. In 2018, it published José Olivarez's poetry collection Citizen Illegal, which won the Chicago Review of Books award for best poetry and was shortlisted for the PEN/Jean Stein Book Award.
