= LGBTQ advocacy in the Gaza war =

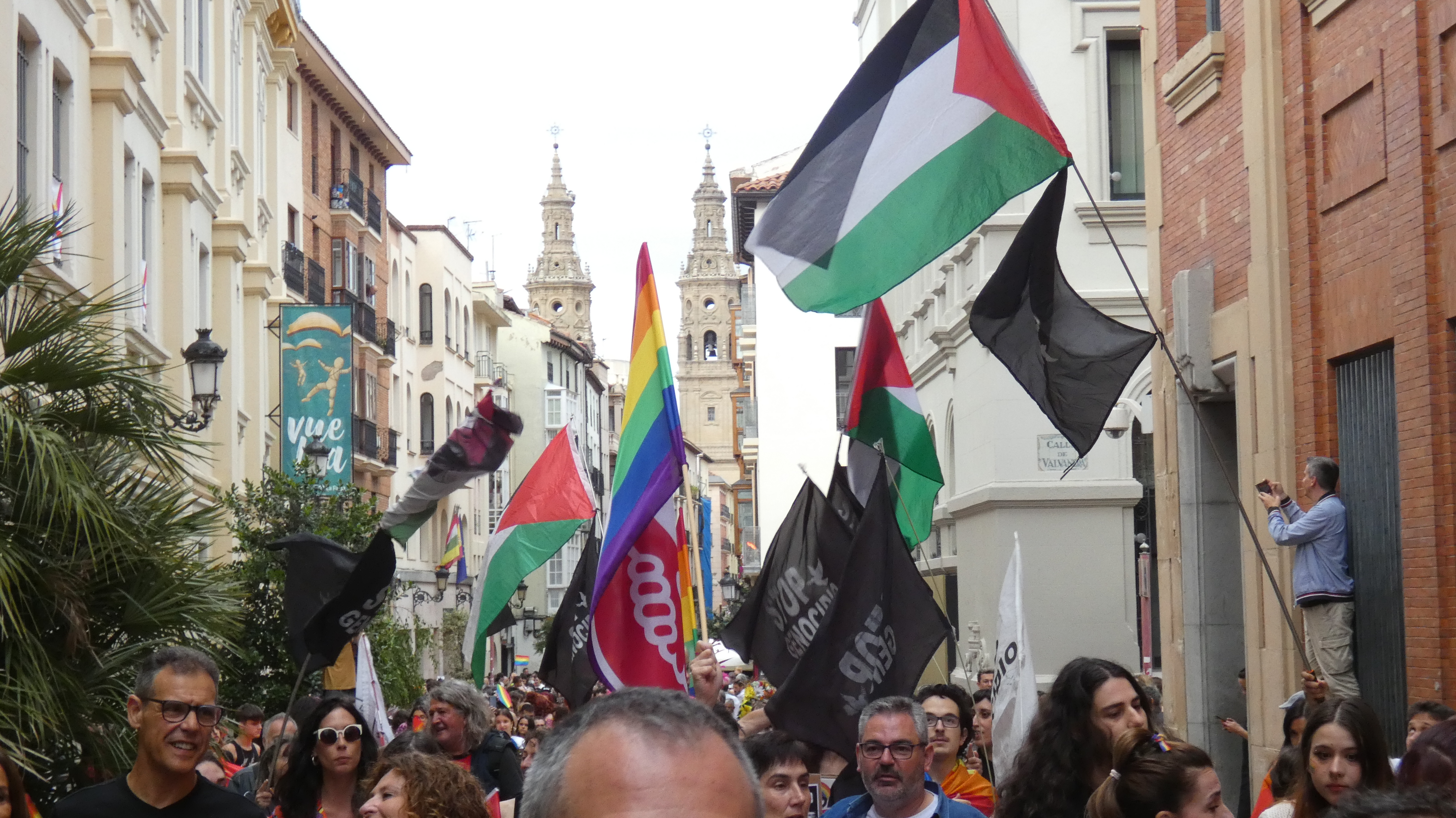
Pro-Palestine Protest at Logroño Pride

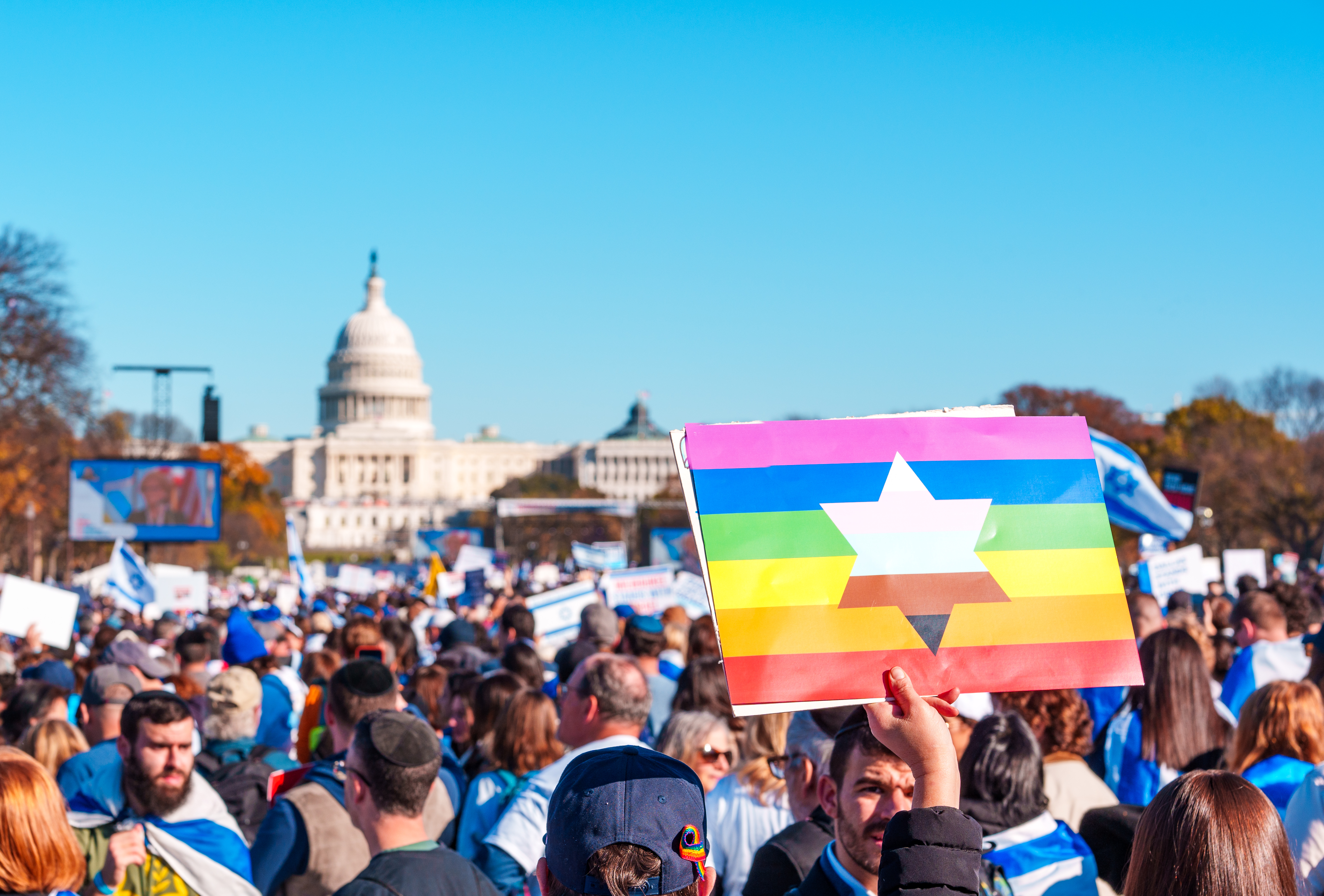
2023 March for Israel Rally

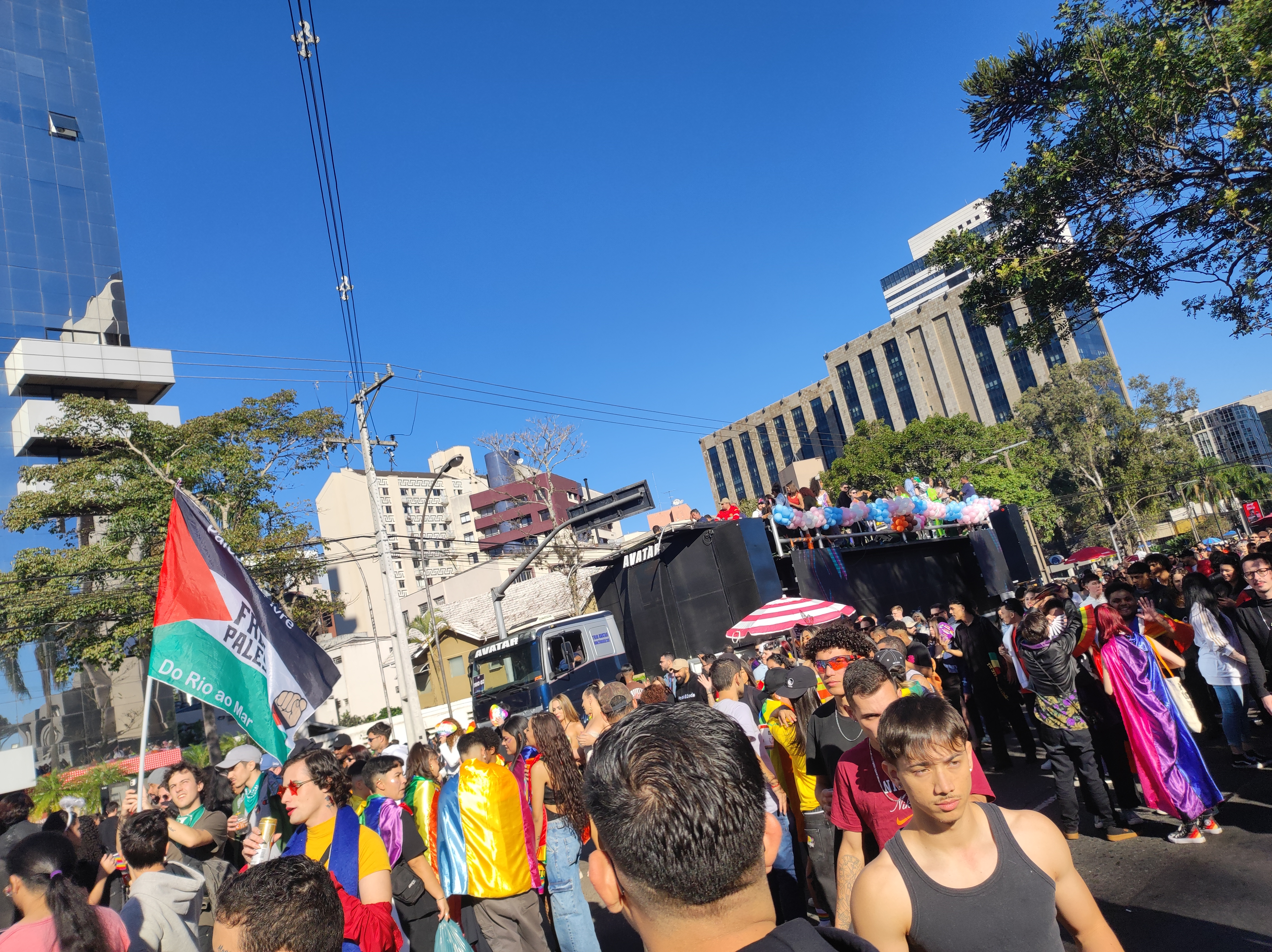
2024 LGBTQIA March in Curitiba

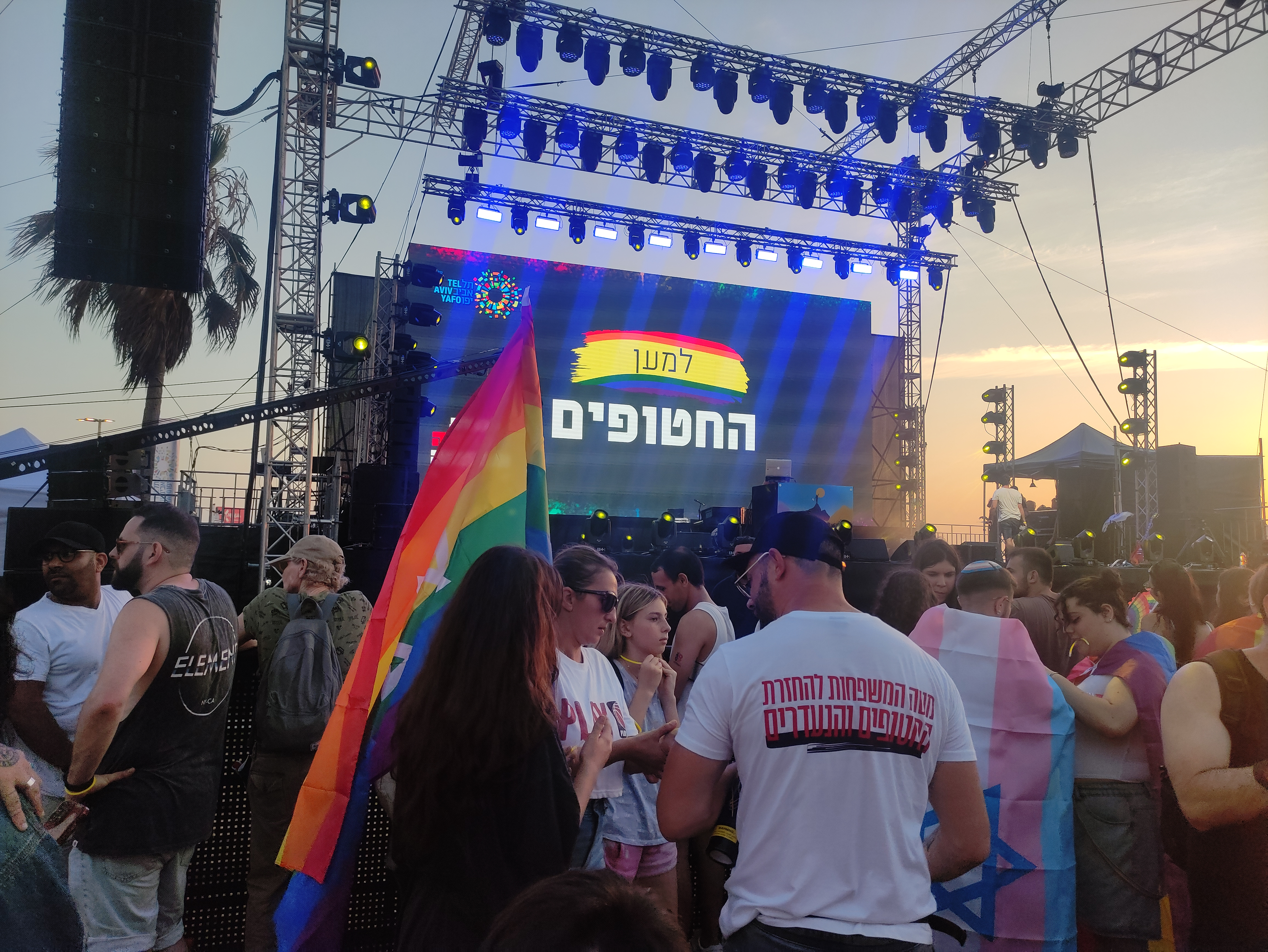
2024 Gay Pride and Hope Rally in Tel Aviv

LGBTQ advocacy in the Gaza war has remained a significantly contentious topic. Many LGBTQ people allied themselves with pro-Palestinian causes, especially in protest movements against the ongoing war, and against the Gaza genocide. Some pro-Palestinian LGBTQ people have claimed common cause between queer liberation and Palestinian liberation, though others have called such movements antisemitic and self-contradictory. Some pro-Israeli LGBTQ people have complained about feeling excluded from traditionally LGBTQ spaces due to pro-Palestinian LGBTQ advocacy.

== Background ==
The Gaza war has sparked protests, demonstrations, and vigils around the world. These protests focused on a variety of issues related to the conflict, including demands for a ceasefire, an end to the Israeli blockade and occupation, return of Israeli hostages, protesting war crimes, ending US support for Israel and providing humanitarian aid to Gaza. Since the war began on 7 October 2023, the death toll has exceeded 70,000.

1. Middle East 22,066 (46.0%): 22,066 events
2. Europe & Central Asia 8,298 (17.3%): 8,298 events
3. Africa 6,528 (13.6%): 6,528 events
4. United States & Canada 6,097 (12.7%): 6,097 events
5. Asia-Pacific 4,556 (9.50%): 4,556 events
6. Latin America & the Caribbean 436 (0.91%): 436 events

In past decades, many prominent LGBTQ figures have expressed solidarity with or sympathy for the Palestinian cause, such as Jean Genet, June Jordan, Audre Lorde, James Baldwin, Judith Butler, bell hooks and Leslie Feinberg. In 2000, Queers Undermining Israeli Terrorism (QUIT), an explicitly queer Palestinian solidarity group, was founded in the San Francisco Bay Area, with protests from the 2000s onward related to the Israel-Palestine conflict from the LGBTQ community being motivated by the phenomenon of pinkwashing.

== Pro-Palestinian queer advocacy ==
Queer pro-Palestinian activists have stated that Israeli usage of the Pride flag and advocacy of queer rights is pinkwashing, especially when attempting to bolster Israel's image globally. Pro-Israeli voices argue that queer and trans Palestinians face significant repression in the Palestinian territories, while Israel has significant protections for queer people. In response, Pro-Palestinian voices argue it is hypocritical to depict Palestinian views on homosexuality as generally repressive when far-right Israeli ministers push homophobic discourse. Pro-Palestinian voices have also argued that it is hypocritical to celebrate equal rights for queer people when Palestinians "don't have equal rights as humans" and when queer Palestinians face significant violence from the war and from Israel exploiting their sexuality.

Queer Palestinians who attempt to seek asylum in Israel continue to face significant racism, and may be barred from the healthcare system and from residence permits. One queer Palestinian professor, Sa'ed Atshan, argues that it is "very dangerous to pathologize Palestinian society as uniquely homophobic" and "uniquely bigoted on collective level", suggesting that it dehumanizes and stigmatizes Palestinians. Queer Palestinian activist groups have remained active since the start of the war, with Rauda Morcos noting that queer Palestinians face human rights violations from Israeli authorities in the same way as other Palestinians. Many queer pro-Palestinians have protested due to sympathy with the humanitarian crisis as a result of the war, claiming shared goals between Queer liberation and Palestinian liberation. One anonymous social media group, Queers for Palestine, has formed to track which queer advocacy groups have signed a "No Pride in Genocide" statement.

Many pro-Israeli writers have dismissed the increase in advocacy, arguing that being queer for Palestine is similar to "chickens for KFC", as Palestinian society remains conservative against queer rights. As a result of increased pro-Palestinian activism, Israeli comedy sketch shows, such as Eretz Nehederet, began airing comedy bits lampooning the supposed hypocrisy, suggesting Hamas fighters would throw student protesters off of buildings. Such rhetoric has been criticised as in of itself indicative and reflective of anti-LGBTQ sentiment and stereotypes.

=== Public figures ===
Several LGBTQ celebrities and public figures have supported Palestine during the Gaza war. Susan Sarandon, Sara Ramirez, Indya Moore, and Hunter Schafer have attended pro-Palestine protests. A "Queer Artists for Palestine" letter that condemns Israeli policies towards Palestinians and pledges not to make public appearances in Israel has garnered over 3500 signatures, including boygenius, MUNA, Bella Ramsey, Bowen Yang, and Sasha Velour. Cynthia Nixon participated in a hunger strike in front of the White House in November 2023. During January 2024 proceedings in South Africa's genocide case against Israel, PalFest released a video of Susan Sarandon, Indya Moore, Cynthia Nixon, Alia Shawkat, and others reading an excerpt from South Africa's argument. The May 2024 music video for Kehlani's song "Next 2 U" includes Palestinian flags, keffiyehs, and the slogan: "Long Live the Intifada." In her March 2025 speech accepting an award from Human Rights Campaign (HRC), Hannah Einbinder condemned "the Israeli government's massacre of well over 65,000 Palestinians in Gaza". Her speech was supported by Ben Platt.

In an essay for The New Yorker, journalist Masha Gesson argued that the memory of the Holocaust is misused in Europe and Israel and compared Gaza to a Jewish ghetto in Nazi Europe. Judith Butler has stated that Israel is committing genocide in Gaza; they called the October 7 attacks "an act of armed resistance" but later clarified that they did not support the attacks. Dean Spade, Steven Thrasher, and Kai Cheng Thom have criticized Israeli pinkwashing, and Fatimah Asghar wrote an essay calling on the LGBTQ community to support Palestine. Thrasher co-wrote an article about the Israeli blockade's impact on medication access for queer people with HIV in Gaza. Maura Finkelstein and Thrasher lost academic positions due to their pro-Palestine activism. After criticizing The New York Times for its coverage of the Gaza war, writers Jazmine Hughes, Jamie Lauren Keiles, and Anne Boyer resigned and Nan Goldin withdrew a photography project from the paper. Performance artist Morgan Bassichis organizes protests with Jewish Voice for Peace. Influencer and makeup artist Matt Bernstein creates pro-Palestine content, for which he has been called a "self-hating Jew". Sim Kern became a pro-Palestine content creator soon after the October 7 attacks; they later published Genocide Bad (2025), a critique of Zionism and Israeli hasbara.

=== Organizations ===
Organizations such as National Queer Asian Pacific Islander Alliance, ACT UP NY, Black and Pink, and Queers Undermining Israeli Terrorism (QUIT!) have criticized Israel during the Gaza War. QUIT! and ACT UP NY have organized pro-Palestine protests. ACT UP NY has also endorsed the Boycott, Divestment and Sanctions movement, coined slogans like "FIGHT AIDS, NOT PALESTINIANS", and revamped their pink triangle logo to look like a watermelon.

Queer activists have criticized influential LGBTQ advocacy groups like GLAAD, the Trevor Project, and HRC for their lack of public support for Palestine. In February 2024, pro-Palestine activists protested HRC galas in New York City and Washington, DC, criticizing their partnership with Northrop Grumman, a weapons company. A few months later, the drag queen Chiquitita disrupted a GLAAD awards event in New York City, shouting "GLAAD is complicit in genocide", while ACT UP led a protest outside. The activists urged GLAAD to end its partnership with the ADL, because of its opposition to pro-Palestine student protests.

In October 2024, the International Lesbian, Gay, Bisexual, Trans and Intersex Association (ILGA) suspended the membership of The Aguda, an Israeli LGBTQ advocacy organization. Additionally, ILGA decided to remove The Aguda's bid to hold a future ILGA conference in Tel Aviv. The decision came after more than 70 member organizations of ILGA submitted a motion opposing the bid on the grounds that it endorsed the Israeli government. The Aguda condemned the decision, highlighting their advocacy work and stating that ILGA should not oppose Israeli government policy by ostracizing Israel's queer community. After investigating, ILGA decided to restore The Aguda's membership, stating that it could not require member organizations to denounce their governments' actions. ILGA also criticized The Aguda, including its "reluctance to condemn war crimes plausibly amounting to genocide in Gaza".

== Pro-Israeli queer advocacy ==
In an October 2023 op-ed, David Kilmnick, president of the New York queer advocacy group LGBT Network, urged the LGBT community to support Israel. Billy Porter signed an open letter organized by Creative Community for Peace calling on the entertainment industry to support Israel. The following month, the Israeli foreign ministry tweeted a photo of a gay Israeli soldier standing in front of destroyed buildings in Gaza and holding a rainbow flag that said: "in the name of love". The soldier stated: "the IDF is the only army in the Middle East that defends democratic values." He called for equal rights for LGBT Israelis and said that he hoped to show their contributions to the war effort. The photo was criticized as an example of pinkwashing.

Gay porn producer, Michael Lucas, tweeted a photo of an Israeli missile with "From Michael Lucas, to Gaza" written on it in December 2023. He said that an Israeli soldier had sent him the photo to thank him for donating. There was backlash from social media users and porn stars who refused to work with him, which he attributed to antisemitism. The following month, a photo of an Israeli missile stating "IDF you better WERK!", "Queers Against Hamas", and the names of 3 pro-Palestine drag queens went viral on social media. Willow Pill, one of the drag queens named, strongly criticized the photo and pro-Israel queer people on social media.

Ritchie Torres, a gay congressman from New York, has consistently advocated for Israel. He has said that he supports Israel in part because of his experiences of the gay community in Tel Aviv and has denied that his support is due to the AIPAC funding he receives. Torres has opposed a ceasefire, spoken at the March for Israel, and called accusations that Israel is committing genocide a "blood libel". As of June 2024, City & State estimated that about half of the content on his personal Twitter account was about Israel. His views have led to conflict with fellow Democrats; he has criticized the Democratic Socialists of America and voted to censure Palestinian-American congresswoman Rashida Tlaib.

A Wider Bridge, a pro-Israel LGBTQ organization, has made statements regarding the right of Jewish people to feel safe at LGBTQ events and has criticized the LGBTQ community as lacking sympathy towards Jews and Israelis. The organization has sought to highlight antisemitism in the LGBTQ community, releasing a report on the subject in conjunction with Eshel.

== Response from queer Jews ==
Many queer Jews, both Zionist and non-Zionist, have sought support from queer Jewish advocacy groups during the conflict. Both groups have described fallouts with various communities due to their intersecting beliefs. Many pro-Israeli queers have felt unease in some queer spaces as a result of queer pro-Palestinian advocacy. One opinion writer at The Jerusalem Post wrote that Queers for Palestine had caused significant pain and betrayal for many queer Jews and Israelis. They also condemned some of the queer Jews who supported Queers for Palestine due to accepting "the false leftist binary of ... the oppressed and oppressor". Amichai Lau-Lavie, a queer rabbi, argued that despite his opposition against occupation of the West Bank, he felt that framing of the issue by many queers was reductive, which had pushed him away from participating in some queer spaces. Elliot Kukla, another queer Jewish writer, has argued that Jewish and queer backgrounds of suffering is the context for pro-Palestinian activism by many queer Jews during the war.

== Pride ==
=== 2024 ===
==== New York ====
In New York, the Israeli Consulate announced that it would reduce its presence at the Pride Parade, due to both safety concerns and Israel's somber mood towards the war. Congressman Ritchie Torres criticized Pride-related pro-Palestine activism as "a perversion of pride" that pressures pro-Israel Jews to "be in the closet about [their] Zionism". Pro-Palestine activists affiliated with Writers Against the War on Gaza temporarily blocked the NYC Pride March when several protesters breached the barricade and painted the streets red. Activists led a call and response chant with the audience, until NYPD arrested 10 activists. Two of the grand marshalls claimed that Israel had been committing a genocide during the war.

ACT UP staged an action at a display honoring LGBTQ "trailblazers" on Fire Island. They replaced a flag honoring Ritchie Torres with one of Cecilia Gentili in protest of Torres's collaboration with the NYPD and his pro-Israel advocacy. Additionally, they hung an ACT UP flag that showed their pink triangle logo made of a watermelon, a pro-Palestine symbol, to honor Queer Palestinians. The protest was condemned by Torres who accused ACT UP of supporting Hamas and stated that: "a Queer Palestinian is far freer and safer in Israel than in a Gaza Strip ruled by Hamas." Michael Lucas posted a video on social media of himself removing the watermelon flag and putting in the trash.

The NYC Dyke March issued a statement supporting the safety of Jewish participants at the march and condemning the 7 October attacks. The statement was soon replaced with another stating that the organization "unapologetically stands in support of Palestinian liberation". The march also raised money for the pro-Palestine group Within Our Lifetime. In opposition, a group of Jewish lesbians held a separate event at the same time.

==== Elsewhere in the US ====
During Philadelphia's Pride Parade, queer counter protesters disrupted the march, at one point facing off against the drumline. Protesters chanted slogans such as "No pride in genocide".

Queer pro-Palestine activists called for a boycott of San Francisco Pride (SF Pride) due to corporate sponsors' ties to Israel, police participation, and the decision to make Billy Porter, who has made pro-Israel statements, Grand Marshal. An alternative "No pride in genocide" march was attended by more than a thousand participants. Pro-Israel groups criticized SF Pride for posting a statement suggesting an Israeli float would be barred from participating in the march. SF Pride later clarified that there had been no Israeli float registered by the deadline.

In Boston, over 100 protestors blocked the Boston Pride parade, two of whom were detained by police. Over 60 pro-Palestine organizations called for Boston Pride to divest from companies they said had ties to Israel. In Washington DC, Yuval David posted a video of Capital Pride participants booing him and other pro-Israel marchers. Abby Stein was removed from a White House pride event for chanting pro-Palestine slogans.

Members of Cincinnati Socialists were asked to leave a pride event for handing out flyers alleging that Israel was conducting a "Final Solution" against Palestinians. Several days later, Cincinnati Socialists made an Instagram post "naming and shaming" two Jewish Cincinnati Pride board members for supporting Israel. Afterwards, Cincinnati Pride released a statement that two Jewish board members had been threatened with violence and were resigning for safety reasons. The local Jewish Federation condemned the Cincinnati Socialists as antisemitic and organized a separate pride parade.

==== Outside of the US ====
Tel Aviv cancelled its 2024 Pride Parade, instead holding a rally in support of the Israeli hostages and the Israeli military. The event included appearances from Noa Kirel, LGBTQ activists, and families of the hostages. Awards were given to a soldier who served in Gaza and the partner of Sagi Golan, a soldier killed on October 7. The Jerusalem pride parade was held without music and attracted fewer attendees than usual. The theme was "Born to be Free", and speakers included Yair Lapid, hostage families, and Sagi Golan's partner.

The Glasgow Greens and Rainbow Greens of the Scottish Greens marched in a "No Pride in Genocide: Radical Bloc" instead of the parade's "Green Bloc". Gary Kinsman, who co-founded Pride Toronto, resigned from the organizing committee due to its ties with corporations that are involved in the Gaza war. Thirty protesters from the Coalition Against Pinkwashing blocked the parade for 45 minutes, chanting pro-Palestine slogans and handing out literature. As a result, event organizers ended the parade early.

=== 2025 ===
A pride month concert in New York City's Central Park was cancelled due to concerns about "security" and "controversy" from Mayor Eric Adams. The performer, Kehlani, had another concert at Cornell University cancelled that year due to their pro-Palestine advocacy. Kehlani later withdrew from headlining the San Francisco Pride festival, after the organizers released a statement condemning her pro-Palestine stance. Eight Jewish groups, the mayor, UC San Diego, and others decided not to participate in San Diego Pride due to Kehlani's participation as headliner at the festival. The festival lost financial support due to Kehlani's performance but experienced record ticket sales. Event organizers affirmed their opposition to hate speech and their support for "dissenting voices", and Kehlani performed as planned.

Youth Demand disrupted London Pride for an hour by pouring red paint on the Cisco float, gluing themselves to it, and chanting "we charge you with genocide". Five activists were arrested. On social media they posted a statement accusing Cisco of aiding Israel in committing genocide in Gaza.

Jerusalem Pride observed the 10-year anniversary of the murder of Shira Banki, a parade participant, and Yair Lapid criticized right-wing opposition to LGBTQ rights. Some marchers held signs calling for an end to the war and the release of the Israeli hostages. A left-wing group called on Israelis to refuse to join the military and stated that Israel was "killing gay people in Gaza." Police removed anti-war signs and arrested a protester. Caitlyn Jenner visited Israel as a guest of honor for Tel Aviv Pride, but the event was cancelled due to the Twelve-Day War.

== See also ==
- Incidents regarding Jewish pride flags and anti-Zionism at the Dyke March
- Solidarity
- List of companies involved in the Gaza war
