= Victoria Law =

American anarchist (born 1977)

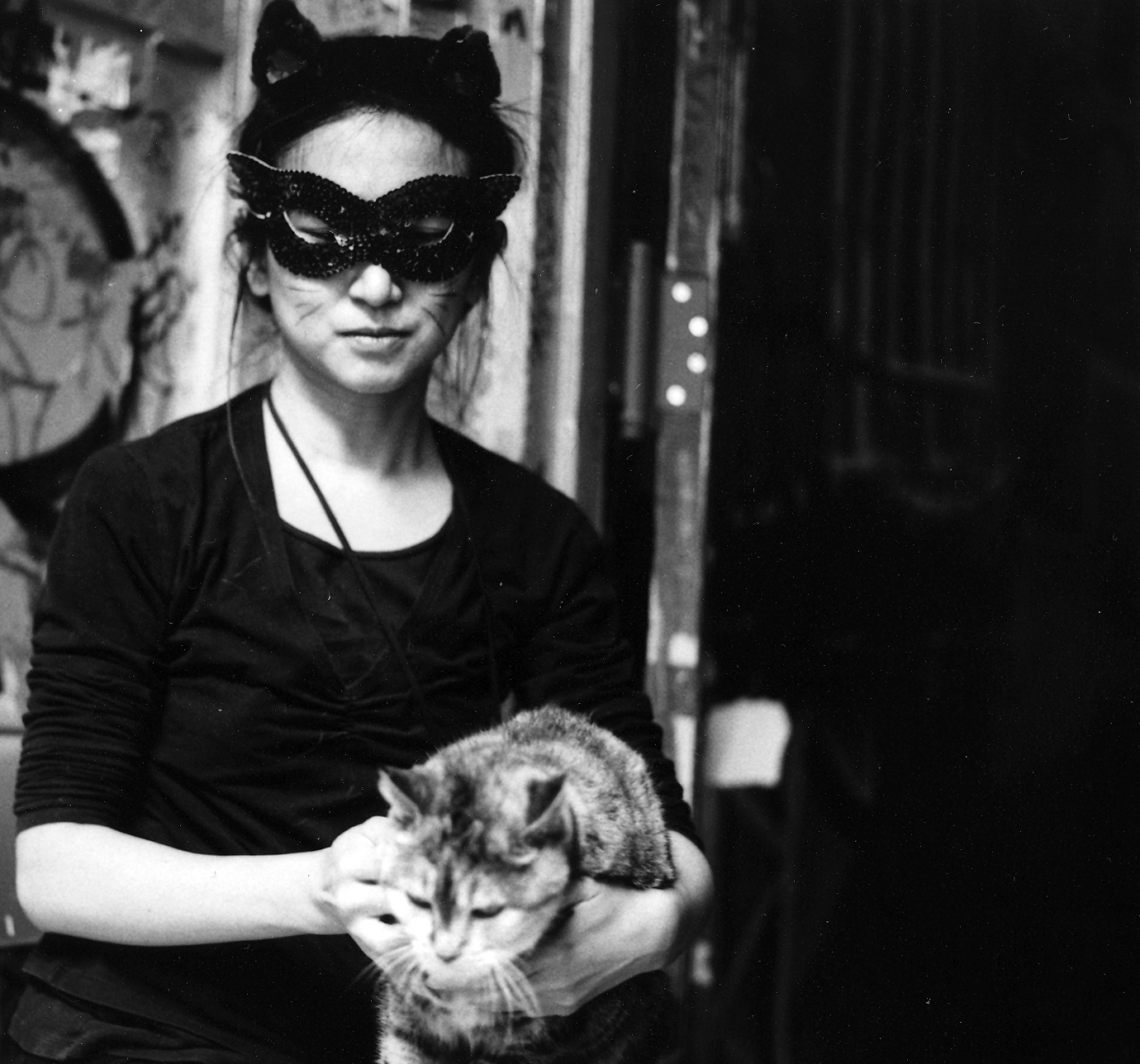
- Victoria Law at an ABC No Rio Halloween open house
- Born: Jamaica, Queens, New York City
- Education: Brooklyn College
- Occupations: Freelance writer and editor; Prison abolition activist
- Writing career
- Notable work: Resistance Behind Bars: The Struggles of Incarcerated Women
- Website: victorialaw.net

Victoria Law, familiarly known as Vikki Law, is an American anarchist activist, prison abolitionist, writer, freelance editor, and photographer. Her books include Resistance Behind Bars: The Struggles of Incarcerated Women (2009), Prison by Any Other Name: The Harmful Consequences of Popular Reforms (co-authored by Maya Schenwar, 2020), and Corridors of Contagion: How the Pandemic Exposed the Cruelties of Incarceration (2024).

== Background and education ==
Victoria Law is of Chinese descent and was born and raised in Queens, New York. As an A student in high school, she committed armed robbery to initiate herself into a Chinatown gang but was given probation as a first offense. Her exposure to incarcerated people at Rikers Island prompted her to get involved in prison support.

== Career ==
Law continued fighting for prison abolition, co-founding Books Through Bars NYC, a books-to-prisoners organization, as a joint project between Blackout Books and Nightcrawlers Anarchist Black Cross in 1996 at the age of nineteen. In 2003, at the prompting of women incarcerated in an Oregon prison, she launched the zine Tenacious: Art and Writing from Women in Prison. In 2009, after a decade of researching and writing about incarcerated women in the United States, Law published her first monograph with PM Press, Resistance Behind Bars: The Struggles Of Incarcerated Women, with a second edition released in 2012. She is a frequent invited speaker, especially since publishing the first edition of Resistance Behind Bars.

Law works with Books Through Bars (now located at Freebird Bookstore in Brooklyn). She has participated in many of ABC No Rio's projects, including its Visual Arts Collective and the darkroom that she co-founded and co-built. She has had tangential involvement in the punk collective, as well, and was the primary caregiver of the art and activist space's last remaining squatter, Cookiepuss (1996–2013), a calico cat.

In her twenties, after having a child, Law's activism began to include raising awareness of parents in anarchist communities' need for solidarity, including free childcare activities at events and protests. Together with long-time mamazine maker China Martens, Law began doing workshops and editing compilation zines about parenting for activists and their allies, called Don't Leave Your Friends Behind. The two eventually co-edited a book by the same name, also published by PM Press. As her child got older and Law engaged with the literature her child read, Law began to focus attention on the lack of racial diversity in young adult fiction, including writing a series of blog posts on girls of color in dystopia for Bitch Media.

== Selected works ==
=== Books ===
- Resistance Behind Bars: The Struggles of Incarcerated Women, PM Press, 2009
- Don't Leave Your Friends Behind: Concrete Ways to Support Families in Social Justice Movements and Communities, Edited with China Martens, PM Press, 2012
- Prison by Any Other Name: The Harmful Consequences of Popular Reforms. Co-authored by Maya Schenwar. The New Press, 2020
- Prisons Make Us Safer: And 20 Other Myths about Mass Incarceration, Beacon Press, 2021
- Corridors of Contagion: How the Pandemic Exposed the Cruelties of Incarceration, Haymarket Books, 2024.

=== Zines ===
In addition to many zines she has authored or edited:

- Tenacious: Art & Writing from Women in Prison, 2003–2020, editor
- Nefarious Doings series, about travel in Hong Kong and South Africa, 2006
- Tell Me About the First Time You Came to ABC No Rio, self published, 2006
- Mamazines, contributor

=== Articles, blog posts and web articles ===
In addition to print articles about gender, incarceration and resistance, she is a regular contributor to online news and culture venues, including Bolts, The Nation, and Truthout, among others.

Law has contributed to Women and Prison: A Site for Resistance which shares women's experiences in the criminal justice system. The site gives a voice to previously and currently incarcerated women along with those who seek social justice in the criminal justice system for these women. Law wrote two articles for the site, Invisibility of Women Prisoner Resistance and Where Abolition Meets Action: Women Organizing Against Gender Violence.

In 2023, she interviewed Leigh Goodmark about the release of her latest book.

== Awards ==
- 2013, Health Behind Bars Fellowship, John Jay’s Center on Media, Crime and Justice
- 2011, Brooklyn College Young Alumna Award
- 2009, Prevention for a Safer Society PASS Award for book Resistance Behind Bars: The Struggles of Incarcerated Women
