= Colleen McCarty =

American lawyer and podcaster

Colleen McCarty is a lawyer, author, and podcaster from Tulsa, Oklahoma. She is the founder and former executive director of the Oklahoma chapter of the Appleseed Foundation network.

== Early life and education ==
Colleen McCarty was born to Paula Marshall and Mike McCarty. Colleen McCarty has worked for the Bama Companies, a family business. McCarty attended the University of Tulsa for undergrad and the University of Tulsa College of Law for law school. While an undergrad, she was an officer for the college's Coalition for Women's Issues and opposed Playboy holding auditions on campus. When in law school, she competed on the Native American Law Student Appellate Team and traveled to Berkeley Law to participate in a national competition." She also served as an Articles Submission Editor on the Tulsa Law Review.

== Legal career ==
McCarty has worked in criminal justice policy since 2018 when she was a law student who "assisted in the commutation of over thirty drug sentences of people serving in Oklahoma prisons." She was named one of Tulsa World's "People to Watch" for 2024. She is the co-founder of the Oklahoma Survivor Justice Coalition. She has written against high incarceration rates and how it does not automatically lead to public safety. Along with other attorneys supporting teachers, McCarty attended the protest in support of the 2018 Oklahoma teachers' strike.

=== Oklahoma Appleseed Center for Law and Justice ===
McCarty launched the Oklahoma chapter of the Appleseed Network in 2022. That initial year, the nonprofit worked on areas such as investigating and reporting on prosecutorial misconduct, child abuse in the Tulsa County Juvenile Detention Center, as well as in criminal justice reform. That same year, she began co-hosting the Panic Button podcast, an investigative podcast about domestic violence in Oklahoma. This was part of an effort to lobby Oklahoma lawmakers "to draft and pass a bill that would let courts resentence certain survivors of abuse—specifically, ones whose crimes were related to the domestic violence they experienced." Outlets like Mother Jones, Bolts, Making Contact Radio, and Slate detailed McCarty's advocacy to pass and implement legislation to reduce sentencing for criminalized survivors in Oklahoma, which began with a September 2022 Oklahoma House interim study where McCarty spoke alongside others, such as Leigh Goodmark, to a committee.

Later in 2023, McCarty would work with Oklahoma Representative Toni Hasenbeck to create a bill and file that sentencing reform legislation. Though it was backed by Attorney General Gentner Drummond and it passed the House, the retroactive application for the sentencing ranges was removed from the language and it ultimately failed that session. In 2024, McCarty was able to work with Representative John Echols and Senator Greg Treat to introduce and pass a new version of the legislation. She and Leslie Briggs filed the first application for a survivor, which was in the Tulsa county courthouse. McCarty co-represented the first cases to apply under the new law pro-bono and was the attorney of the first woman released in Oklahoma under the new sentencing ranges. McCarty has denounced the pushback from District Attorneys offices in Oklahoma, specifically from the Tulsa office, claiming it has lead to denials of relief under the new law. McCarty accused Tulsa DA Steve Kunzweiler of undermining the law when his office created a waiver for survivors to give up the rights it grants if taking a plea deal.

A 2026 joint-profile of the legislation's impact in the New York Times and Propublica by Pamela Colloff stated that the opposition from the Tulsa County District Attorney Steve Kunzweiler is what lead McCarty to run against him for his seat. McCarty has also spoken out against Failure to Protect cases and how sentencing is often more extreme for the mothers who were also abused than the men doing the abuse. She was part of a settlement plan from a "lawsuit that accused the state of not providing timely mental health services to people awaiting services in county jail." She also advocated for changing Life without Parole sentencing in Oklahoma.

=== Campaign for District Attorney ===
In early 2026, McCarty announced her bid for Tulsa County District Attorney. She is running as a Republican against the incumbent, Steve Kunzweiler. NonDoc called it the most-watched race in Tulsa after the filing deadline. She says she decided to run after she "prayed about it" and wants to save Tulsans money, specifying that wrongful convictions have cost large sums in verdicts that taxpayers will have to cover. McCarty has said that the position of district attorney is one of the "most powerful" in the community because all decisions that happen at the state capitol are enforced by them, and there is little oversight of these positions. She feels Republican values are not being reflected in the current DA's office, pointing out "waste, lack of [transparency] and lack of honesty." The Republican primary is June 16, 2026.

=== Other Notable Representation ===
She co-represents a man arrested during the February 2026 Claremore City Council meeting who pleaded not guilty to his charge of trespassing while talking against a data center.

== Personal life ==
In 2008, she married Rusty Rowe. Rowe has run for political office and the couple have two children. McCarty and Rowe opened their first restaurant together in 2008, called The Collective. It was described by the Tulsa World as "part coffee house, part bar, part cafe." In 2010, McCarty and Rowe founded their second restaurant in the Philcade Building, Mod's Coffee and Crepes. The restaurant closed in December 2017.

McCarty is a former ghostwriter. In 2013, she published her first novel Mounting the Whale. In 2017, she published a second novel The Many Names of Magdalena Cruz.
