= Pinkwashing (LGBTQ) =

Promotional use of LGBTQ rights

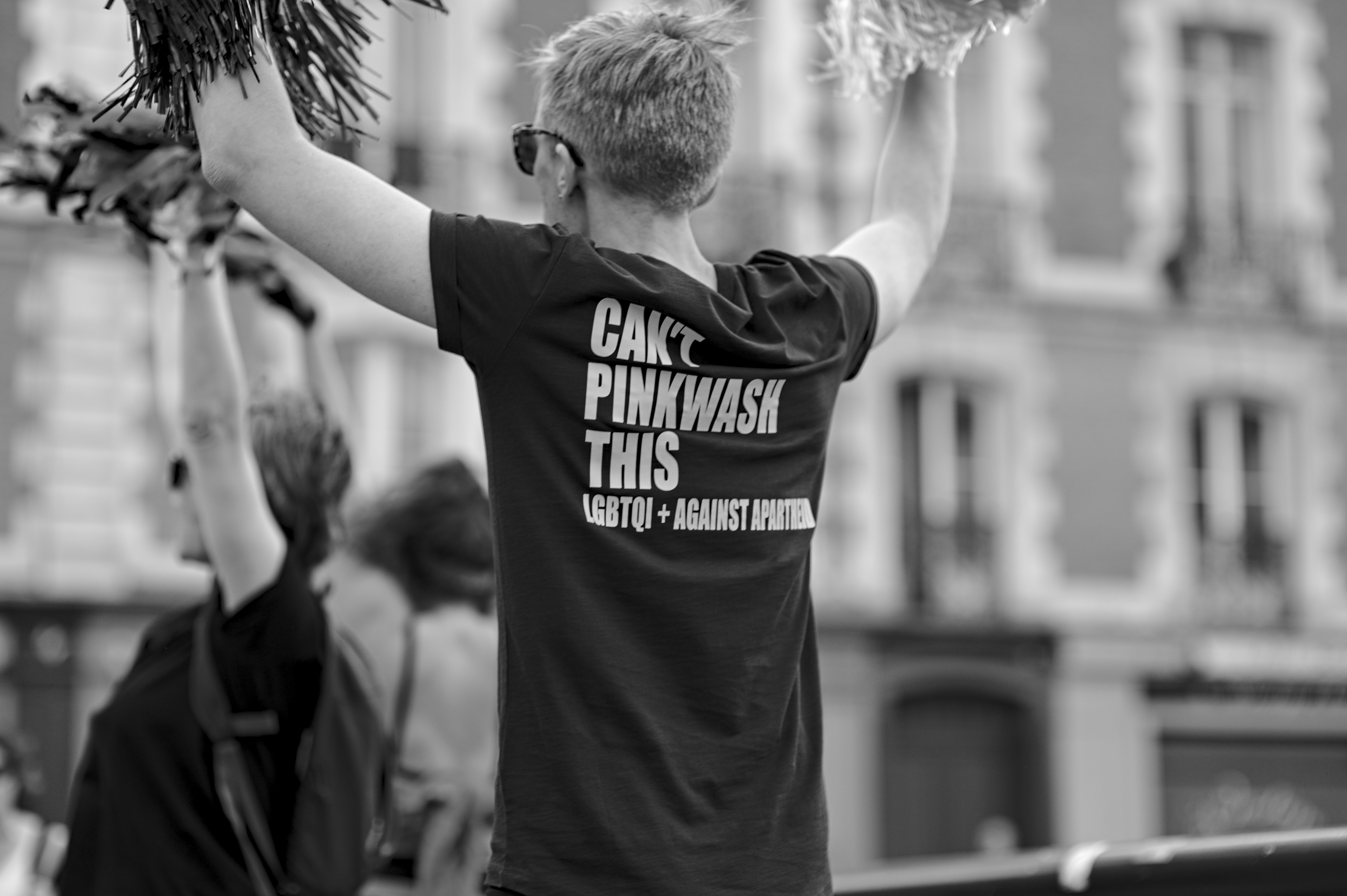
Man wearing t-shirt reading "Can't Pinkwash This - LGBTQI+ Against Apartheid" in Rennes, 2018

Pinkwashing, also known as rainbow-washing, is the strategy of deploying messages that are superficially sympathetic towards the LGBTQ community for ends having little or nothing to do with LGBTQ equality or inclusion, including in rainbow capitalism and other forms of LGBTQ marketing.

== Origin of the term ==
In April 2010, Queers Undermining Israeli Terrorism (QUIT) in the San Francisco Bay Area, used the phrase pinkwashing as a twist on greenwashing, a practice where companies claim to be eco-friendly in order to make profit. Dunya Alwan was at a talk with Ali Abunimah, editor of The Electronic Intifada in 2010, when he said "We won't put up with Israel whitewashing or greenwashing" and she thought "or pinkwashing!"

In 2011, Sarah Schulman used the term pinkwashing in a widely read The New York Times editorial arguing that Israel used the tactic in its public relations. Schulman saw pinkwashing as a manifestation of homonationalism, the processes by which some powers selectively agree with the claims of sexual minorities and exploit them to justify racism, xenophobia (rejection of foreign people), and aporophobia (rejection of the poor); in short, the intersection between gay identities and nationalist ideology. Homonationalism shaped the concept of pinkwashing and the two terms are often used together as tools to explain the actions of countries. Jasbir Puar writes in a later article, Rethinking Homonationalism, that the two terms are not parallel but rather pinkwashing is able to exist because homonationalism exists.

By 2020, "pinkwashing" had become a popular term used by anti-occupation groups to describe the Israeli authorities' attitude towards LGBTQ Palestinians. That same year, Al Qaws published "Beyond Propaganda: Pinkwashing as Colonial Violence," a paper detailing how the Israeli state and its supporters use the language of gay and trans rights to divert international attention away from the oppression of Palestinians.

== By country ==
=== Canada ===
In 2012, Jason Kenney, Canada's Minister of Citizenship and Immigration, was accused of pinkwashing, after an email titled "LGBT Refugees from Iran" was sent to thousands of Canadians. The message contained additional recent comments by John Baird, Minister of Foreign Affairs, about Canada's stand against the persecution and marginalization of gays and lesbian women around the world. A group of activists claimed that it "is a poor attempt at 'pinkwashing' the Conservative government's obvious desire to encourage war with Iran".

=== Belgium ===
The Flemish nationalist party Vlaams Belang and Filip Dewinter shifted their stance on gay issues in the 2010s and began using pro-gay rhetoric to criticize Muslims and immigrants. According to Eric Louis Russell, Dewinter exploits homophobic violence in a similar way that pornography commodifies women's bodies; he argues "that this type of commodification of potential or real violence directed toward members of a society for political ends is a real, albeit subjacent and deeply insidious form of homophobia".

=== France ===
The French government frames LGBTQ rights as emblematic of "French values", contrasting France with supposedly "homophobic" countries while deflecting attention from domestic social unrest. The far right exploits similar rhetoric to attract gay voters and legitimize anti-islamic speech. When same-sex marriage was legalized in 2013, the move was met with intense homophobic backlash, marked by large-scale and prolonged protests, widespread hate speech, and targeted violence, endorsed by religious fundamentalists amongst Christians and Muslims. Statistics from the 2013-2025 period indicate a sustained increase in hate crimes targeting sexual orientation. Politicians often cite how 63% of French Muslims consider homosexuality as “unnatural”, however it is also a fact that 15% of practicing Christians in France have the same view. Marine Le Pen, president of the French far-right political party National Rally, was gaining support from LGBTQ communities in the presidential election, despite the fact that Jean-Marie Le Pen, her estranged father and the founder of the party, once condemned homosexuality as "a biological and social anomaly". Critics point out that while the National Rally claims to "protect gay people from Muslims", the party still aligns with ultra-conservative Catholic movements and international leaders, like Viktor Orbán who are hostile to LGBTQ rights. During his presidency, Emmanuel Macron faced repeated criticism from LGBTQ advocacy groups over his appointment of prominent political figures with a history of opposing same-sex marriage to key government positions. In 2020, Macron appointed Gérald Darmanin as Minister of the Interior, despite Darmanin having voted against the 2013 law and stating at the time that he would refuse to officiate same-sex weddings, although he later apologised and called his own past views as ignorant. In July 2026, controversy intensified when Macron nominated conservative Senator François-Noël Buffet to serve as France's Defender of Rights. Human rights organizations sharply criticized the nomination due to Buffet's parliamentary record, which included campaigning and voting against same-sex marriage. Despite a petition opposing his appointment signed by over 100,000 citizens Parliament confirmed Buffet to the post. Buffet apologised and regretted his past positions.

=== Israel ===
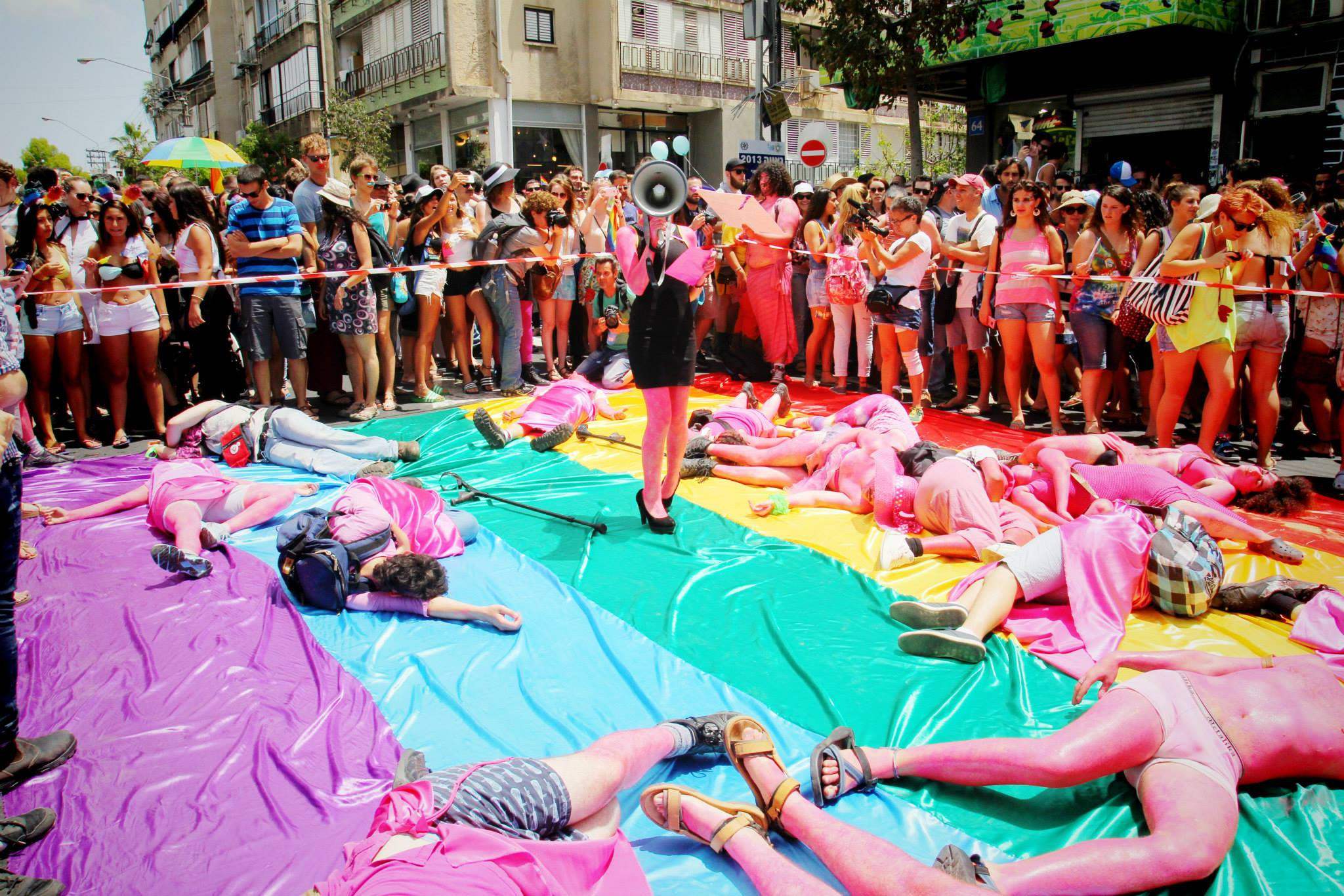
Anarcho-queer collective Mashpritzot hold a die-in protest against Israeli pinkwashing and the perceived homonormative priorities of the LGBTQ support center in Tel Aviv

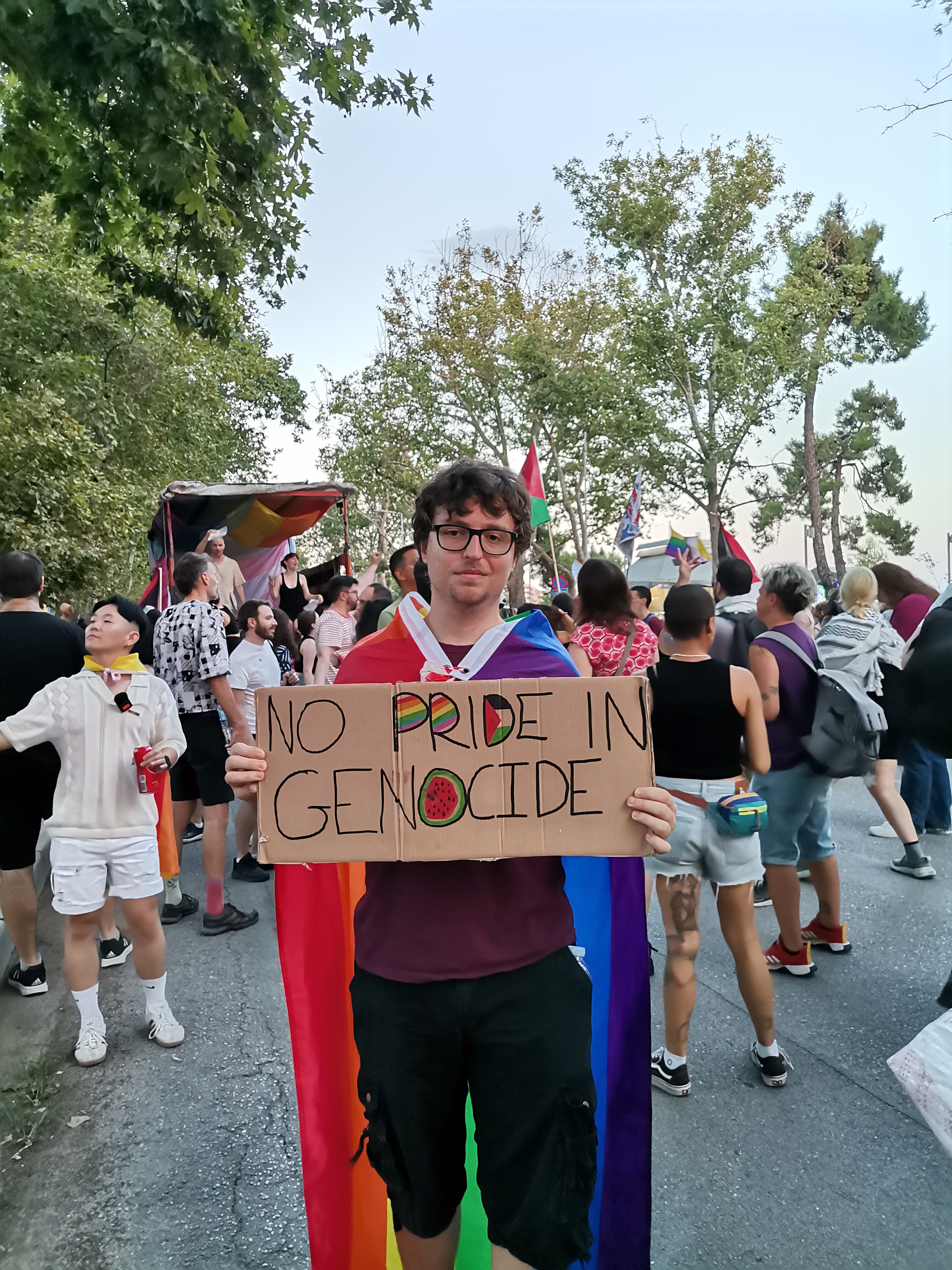
A participant in the 2024 EuroPride in Thessaloniki holding a picket that reads "NO PRIDE IN GENOCIDE"

According to Israeli gay rights activist Hagai El-Ad, "In no other arena has that been used in a more cynical way than in the context of LGBT rights." According to Palestinian anthropologist Sa'ed Atshan, [Israeli] pinkwashing relies on a logic based on four pillars:

1. naming queer Israeli agency and eliding Israeli homophobia;
2. naming Palestinian homophobia and eliding queer Palestinian agency;
3. juxtaposing these contrasting queer experiences in Israeli and Palestinian societies as a civilizational discourse aimed at highlighting the superior humanity of the former and the subhumanity of the latter, who deserve to be dominated; and
4. representing Israel as a gay haven for Israelis, Palestinians, and internationals in order to attract tourism and other forms of solidarity and support.

Opponents of the term pinkwashing in relation to Israel argue that Israeli society has seen meaningful progress on LGBTQ rights that are better than those in neighbouring countries. Others highlight the phenomenon of some gay Palestinians who live illegally in Israel; Israel has historically been against granting asylum to such individuals, but has changed this in recent years, with legal protections being established for LGBTQ Palestinians fleeing violence. Pro-Israel writers also argue that the term is not always applied to other countries that use similar strategies. Ido Aharoni, former head of the Brand Israel project, responded to such criticism, saying: "We are not trying to hide the conflict, but broaden the conversation." Shaul Ganon of the Israeli-based LGBTQ rights group Aguda claimed that "each side is trying to gain some points. The truth is the only one who gets screwed by this is the Palestinian gays." According to Atshan, "the critiques leveled against [anti-pinkwashing activists] are often not well founded or ethically deployed. It is particularly disconcerting when supporters of Israel instead cast Israeli state sources of victimization as saviors of queer Palestinians." He also argues that anti-pinkwashing can go too far when activists prioritize the struggle against Israeli occupation and only bring up LGBTQ issues to criticize Israel.

The heteropatriarchal nationalism with traditional Palestinian roots enhances the construction of nationhood, heroism, and liberation through the ideas of strict gender roles and heterosexual norms. LGBTQ rights in Palestine and within Palestinian society have been grassrootsed through religious practices but also through nationalism, distorting the narrative of LGBTQ becoming political. Referencing Walaa Alqaisiya's idea in her academic piece 'Decolonial Queering', Walaa Alqaisiya's emphasizes the ideology of Women being praised and congratulated as being the 'mothers and birthers of the nation', while men and sons are urged to achieve national glory through heroism and to focus their morals towards defending and protecting their country. Walaa Alqaisiya's notes that the idea of homosexuality was frequently connected to treason and against traditional ideology in Palestinian society, but the author also highlights how the Israeli authorities, through their occupation of Palestine, have been violently targeting the LGBTQ community. It reflects how Queer individuals are oppressed in their homeland and from the Israeli population, facing oppression and struggle from both societies. But a significant aspect to highlight is that the violence and persecution faced by Palestinian LGBTQ groups from the Israeli population have been a tool to create discourse. Alqaisiya's piece continues to emphasize how the Israeli government uses the notion that Palestinian are 'traditional' and backwards because they are anti-LGBTQ; the government uses this to alienate the world against the Palestinian people. Walaa Alqaisiya's emphasizes the notion of Pink-washing and states, "The tactic seems to have begun in 2002 when Israel recruited its Jewish LGBT community to help promote itself using so-called pink-progressive and LGBT-friendly tropes. In 2005, the effort culminated in an official multimillion-dollar campaign “rebranding” Israel as a modern democracy and gay destination. Presenting itself as “the only democratic and LGBT-friendly country in the Middle East” while simultaneously continuing to expand the colonization of Palestinian land, Israel legitimizes its illegal and oppressive practices against Palestinians whom it depicts as homophobic." Walaa Alqaisiya's echos the argument about how Israel creates this paradise for LGBTQ communities and hails itself for its democratic values, but in turn are subsequently purging the Palestinian population and land.

After the 2011 Gaza Freedom Flotilla, an Israeli actor created a hoax video in which he pretended to have been turned away from the flotilla because he was gay. The video was promoted by the Israeli prime minister's office.

Joseph Massad, associate professor of modern Arab politics and intellectual history at Columbia University, has written that the Israeli government "insist[s] on advertising and exaggerating its recent record on LGBT rights ... to fend off international condemnation of its violations of the rights of the Palestinian people". Culture studies academic Nada Elia calls pinkwashing "the twenty-first century manifestation of the Zionist colonialist narrative of bringing civilization to an otherwise backwards land".

During the Gaza war, queer Palestinians argued that Pride and the Pride flag had been co-opted by a pro-Israeli group to justify and celebrate much of the resulting Gaza humanitarian crisis. Many queer pro-Palestinian activists advocated against the war, disrupting some Pride parades in 2024.

Scholars such as Jasbir Puar situate pinkwashing within the broader framework of homonationalism, arguing that states selectively deploy LGBTQ+ rights to portray themselves as progressive while legitimizing racialized, colonial, or militarized violence. Critical journalists have documented how Israel incorporates LGBTQ+ visibility into public diplomacy, such as through Pride-themed tourism campaigns, government-sponsored social media, and international cultural events to promote an image of tolerance that obscures the ongoing occupation of Palestinian territories. During global events like Eurovision 2019 and Tel Aviv Pride, Israeli ministries highlighted LGBTQ+ inclusion as a symbol of modernity.

Queer Palestinian organizations such as alQaws and Adalah have challenged these narratives, emphasizing that LGBTQ+ Palestinians experience Israeli homophobia alongside structural forms of state violence, displacement, and occupation. These groups have also criticized pinkwashing campaigns for erasing queer Palestinian political agency, particularly during the 2023–2024 Gaza war, when Pride symbols were used by pro-Israel groups to justify or normalize the humanitarian crisis. Scholars note that such examples illustrate how pinkwashing functions not only as a public relations strategy but also as a geopolitical practice that shapes global understandings of queerness, nationalism, and colonial power.

=== Malta ===
Malta's sudden jump from banning divorce until 2011 to becoming ILGA-Europe's top-ranked country for LGBTQ rights has been characterized in media and academic analyses as a deliberate strategy to distract international media from widespread corruption, strict abortion laws, and the 2017 assassination of journalist Daphne Caruana Galizia. Malta has continuously ranked first on the ILGA-Europe Rainbow Index since 2015, coinciding with a time when perceptions of corruption worsened. During the lead-up to his 2013 election, Joseph Muscat stated in an interview that same-sex marriage was "unnatural" and that marriage should be strictly between a man and a woman. However, during the March 2016 Panama Papers, Muscat suddenly changed his stance. As his administration faced accusations of corruption, he declared he was "in favor of same-sex marriage" and that "it's time to debate the issue". Following the passage of same-sex marriage in July 2017, the government lit up the prime minister's office at Auberge de Castille with a rainbow flag and the slogan "We made history", a visual the administration has repeatedly deployed during subsequent political controversies. Despite the government's progressive international image, a 2018 investigation by The Shift News revealed that online groups managed by government officials and Labour Party administrators contained thousands of violently homophobic and transphobic slurs aimed at government critics and LGBTQ individuals. These included derogatory terms like "pufti" (poofters) and offensive descriptions of gay and trans individuals as "disgusting", as well as insults aimed at opposition politicians.

=== Nepal ===
Nepal's government, supported by some activists, media, and lobby groups, has effectively marketed the country as a "beacon of LGBT rights". However, critics argue this campaign is more focused on financial and reputational gains than on advancing genuine LGBTQ rights. While the government projects a progressive image abroad, it has faced criticism for making little progress in areas such as anti-discrimination laws, hate crime protections, and same-sex marriage rights. This focus on international image continues to overshadow the government's failure to address pressing domestic issues including severe air pollution, widespread illiteracy, caste discrimination, corruption, unemployment, child exploitation, child marriage, violence against women, witch hunts and animal cruelty.

=== Sweden ===
A coalition organized by several popular grassroots movements in Europe, including the English Defence League (EDL), mounted counter-jihad demonstrations in conjunction with LGBTQ Pride Week celebrations in Helsinki and Stockholm in July and August 2012. However, these movements inspired a counter demonstration by an LGBTQ rights group called "Queers against Pinkwashing", which claimed that the counter-jihad march against Muslims was a clear example of pinkwashing and projected a fake support image for sexual minorities. In an interview for Radio Sweden, Lisa Bjurwald, a Swedish journalist and expert on European right-wing ideology, criticized the EDL for allying with the wrong people, as "Queers against Pinkwashing" are in fact against singling out Islam as if it were the source of all the relevant problems, because such attempts do not benefit the LGBTQ community.

=== Taiwan ===
In a 2018 national referendum, over 67% of voters explicitly voted against amending the Civil Code to allow same-sex marriage. The government ultimately bypassed the referendum result using a separate law, meaning legalization occurred against the democratic vote of the majority. Following the vote in Taiwan’s parliament, the People's Daily, the official newspaper of the Chinese Communist Party posted a congratulatory message on Twitter:

"Local lawmakers in Taiwan, China, have legalized same-sex marriage, a first in the region."

Using the official ministry account, Taiwanese Foreign Minister Joseph Wu fired back directly at the publication with an unusually aggressive response:

"WRONG!!! The bill was passed by our national parliament & will be signed by the president soon. Democratic Taiwan is a country in itself & has nothing to do with authoritarian China. @PDChina is a commie brainwasher & it sucks. JW"

The law was criticized by LGBTQ advocacy groups for excluding joint adoption rights, IVF access, and international marriages, as well as using ambiguous wording like "permanent union" instead of explicitly stating marriage. Public opinion on same-sex marriage in Taiwan remains divided. A face-to-face survey conducted by Taiwan's Election and Democratization Survey between January and May 2020 found that 43% of respondents supported same-sex marriage, while 57% opposed. A Pew Research Center poll conducted between June and September 2023 showed a similarly divided picture, with 45% of Taiwanese people supporting same-sex marriage and 43% opposing it. In 2026, a poll conducted by the Taiwan Equality Campaign reported that 54% supported same-sex marriage, while 46% remained opposed. In 2022, Taiwan withdrew from hosting WorldPride 2025 due to dissatisfaction with the proposed event name, "WorldPride Kaohsiung" which was considered offensive by both the Taiwanese public and the government. As a result, the event was relocated to Washington, D.C., where it successfully took place under the name "WorldPride Washington, D.C." in June 2025. On 3 October 2026, Taiwanese police raided a gay bar, detaining dozens of gay people on charges of obscenity and offences against morality. Detainees reportedly experienced excessive force, humiliating treatment, interrogation, and homophobic remarks.

== Corporate marketing ==
Pinkwashing in the United States, according to author Stephan Dahl from the University of Hull, is centered around pride merchandise created and sold by companies that do nothing for queer people. This encourages a "big business-small community" relationship and seems beneficial when, in reality, there is nothing changing legally for queer people through this practice.

A campaign to develop public support for the Keystone Pipeline, which would transport Canadian oil through the United States, has been accused of pinkwashing for its argument that the project deserves support based on a comparison of Canada's record on LGBTQ rights compared to that of other oil-producing nations.

In Australia, concern has been raised about the commodification of gay rights by major corporations.

LGBTQ Nation states that "many brands that engage in pinkwashing are guilty of using the LGBTQ community to boost their PR and incur capital from 'pink money', all while maintaining unjust labor practices, discriminatory hiring processes, and supporting anti-LGBTQ organizations".

Some scholars and activists have further described forms of “digital pinkwashing”, in which social media platforms and technology companies foreground LGBTQ-friendly branding while maintaining data and content-moderation practices that disproportionately harm queer and trans people, especially those who are racialized, Indigenous, or from the Global South. Safiya Umoja Noble’s analysis of search engines argues that commercial algorithms reproduce racism and sexism by ranking information about Black women and girls in ways that reinforce stereotypes and structural inequalities, even as the same companies participate in Pride campaigns and diversity marketing. Feminist media scholars such as Sarah Banet-Weiser and Kate M. Miltner have similarly shown how networked misogyny circulates on the same commercial platforms that host corporate “empowerment” messaging and hashtag-based branding. Critics contend that these dynamics allow corporations to present themselves as LGBTQ-inclusive while sidestepping deeper questions about surveillance capitalism, unequal access to digital infrastructures, and the marginalization of communities whose labour and data sustain these platforms.

Other scholars argue that pinkwashing also functions within broader geopolitical contexts, where LGBTQ rights are used to promote national identity, justify foreign policy, or normalize state power. Academic literature on homonationalism, a concept developed by theorist Jasbir Puar, suggests that certain nations deploy LGBTQ-inclusive policies or imagery to present themselves as modern, progressive, or democratic while simultaneously enacting surveillance, militarization, or occupation against racialized or colonized populations.

== Intersex movement ==
In June 2016, Organisation Intersex International Australia pointed to contradictory statements by Australian governments, suggesting that the dignity and rights of LGBTQ and intersex people are recognized while, at the same time, harmful practices on intersex children continue.

In August 2016, Zwischengeschlecht described actions to promote equality or civil status legislation without action on banning "intersex genital mutilations" as a form of pinkwashing. The organization has previously highlighted evasive government statements to UN Treaty Bodies that conflate intersex, transgender and LGBTQ issues, instead of addressing harmful practices on infants.

== Anti-pinkwashing ==
Anti-pinkwashing or pinkwatching is the opposition to pinkwashing. Lynn Darwich and Hannen Maikay, in their article "The Road from Antipinkwashing Activism to the Decolonization of Palestine", allege that accusations of pinkwashing against Israel have led to an intersection of queer rights movements and Palestinian rights movements in Palestine and other countries, despite ongoing discrimination and abuse of LGBTQ individuals within Palestinian-controlled territories. This is a strategy that has allowed the two activist groups to fight for one cause; however, it also places limits on both movements. Darwich and Maikay suggest that the anti-pinkwashing movement has to consider not only pinkwashing but also homonationalism, colonialism, and imperialism. The Palestinian queer movement rejects pinkwashing.

According to Cyril Ghosh, the argument against pinkwashing, portraying Western countries as bastions of LGBTQ freedom while demonizing countries that lack LGBTQ rights protection, has merit, but can fall into "Radical Theory Creep" when multiple strands of critique are combined in a way that lacks analytic rigor.

== See also ==
- Queerbaiting
- Rainbow capitalism

== Sources ==
- Atshan, Sa'ed (2020). "Global Solidarity and the Politics of Pinkwashing". Queer Palestine and the Empire of Critique. Stanford University Press. ISBN 978-1-5036-1240-2.
- Ghosh, Cyril (2018). "Radical Theory Creep". De-Moralizing Gay Rights: Some Queer Remarks on LGBT+ Rights Politics in the US. Springer International Publishing. pp. 11–41. ISBN 978-3-319-78840-1.
- Hartal, Gilly (2020). "Touring and obscuring: how sensual, embodied and haptic gay touristic practices construct the geopolitics of pinkwashing". Social & Cultural Geography. 23 (6): 836–854. doi:10.1080/14649365.2020.1821391. S2CID 224897595.
- Luibhéid, Eithne (2018). "Same-sex marriage and the pinkwashing of state migration controls". International Feminist Journal of Politics. 20 (3): 405–424. doi:10.1080/14616742.2018.1442735. S2CID 148824463.
- Russell, Eric Louis (2019). "Filip Dewinter: Pinkwashing, Populism and Nativism". The Discursive Ecology of Homophobia. Multilingual Matters. ISBN 978-1-78892-346-0.
- Wahab, Amar (2021). "Affective Mobilizations: Pinkwashing and Racialized Homophobia in Out There". Journal of Homosexuality. 68 (5): 849–871. doi:10.1080/00918369.2019.1667158. PMID 31532347. S2CID 202675700.
