= Tower (2016 film) =

2016 American documentary film

- Theatrical release poster
- Directed by: Keith Maitland
- Based on: "96 Minutes" by Pamela Colloff
- Produced by: Keith Maitland; Susan Thomson; Megan Gilbride
- Cinematography: Keith Maitland; Sarah Wilson
- Edited by: Austin Reedy
- Music by: Ossei Essed
- Production companies: Go-Valley; ITVS
- Distributed by: Kino Lorber
- Release dates: March 13, 2016 (SXSW); September 28, 2016 (US)
- Running time: 82 minutes
- Country: United States
- Language: English
- Box office: $101,987

Tower is a 2016 American mostly-animated documentary film about the 1966 shootings at the University of Texas at Austin directed and produced by Keith Maitland.

The film follows the shooting from the perspectives of several survivors, recreating their recounts via actors filmed and later animated in rotoscoping. The film premiered on March 13, 2016, at South by Southwest, before receiving a limited release by Kino Lorber in the United States on September 28, 2016. It was later aired on television on the PBS series Independent Lens.

== Summary ==
On August 1, 1966, Charles Whitman rode the elevator to the top floor of the University of Texas Tower in Austin, Texas and opened fire, holding the campus hostage for 96 minutes. When the gunshots were finally silenced, the toll included 16 dead, three dozen wounded, and a shaken nation left trying to understand what had happened. Archival footage is combined with rotoscopic animation to illustrate the stories of the witnesses, heroes and survivors.

== Production ==
The film is based on a 2006 Texas Monthly article by Pamela Colloff, "96 Minutes." Maitland originated from New Jersey and attended UT Austin. Maitland read the article and asked Colloff to have lunch with him. He suggested making a film about the incident during the meeting. Colloff became one of the executive producers of the film. Various University of Texas students worked on the film as interns.

To finance the film the creators opened an Indiegogo, generating almost $70,000 from over 330 people in six weeks. In the final few days alumni of UT offered up a matching grant.

Early on, Maitland realized that he and his team likely would not be able to film reenactments on the university campus, so they instead decided to opt for an animated aesthetic "to show the geography of the campus". Footage was mostly shot in Maitland's backyard and then animated by production company Minnow Mountain who was aided by pictures Maitland had shot around campus. Over 100 people were interviewed including at-the-time media members, police, students, and faculty, who had witnessed the events, but a few selective interviews were used.

== Reception ==
On review aggregation website Rotten Tomatoes, the film has an approval rating of 99% based on 100 reviews, with an average rating of 8.5/10. The site's critical consensus reads, "Tower probes into a painful chapter of American history with sensitivity and grace -- and revisits its events from a valuable new perspective." Justin Chang of Variety wrote that the film is "a uniquely cinematic memorial that will be in demand from programmers and buyers as the 50th anniversary of the shootings approaches."

It also won numerous best documentary awards, including at the 2016 Austin Film Critics Association and the 2018 News & Documentary Emmy Awards.

== About Keith Maitland ==
Keith Maitland is an American filmmaker, director, and producer, known for his work in both documentary and narrative cinema. Maitland is known for his innovative storytelling techniques and his dedication to exploring complex social issues. He is the co-founder of Go-Valley, a production company specializing in fiction and nonfiction projects.

Maitland's career began as a Directors Guild of America trainee in New York. He worked on Martin Scorsese's Bringing Out the Dead as part of his program as well as Law & Order, Small Time Crooks, Tigerland, Lost Souls, and Law & Order: Special Victims Unit.

After working as an assistant director in the DGA, Maitland switched focus to independent filmmaking, producing and directing documentaries. Maitland's documentaries explore themes of human resilience and untold histories. His works have premiered at major film festivals such as SXSW, Tribeca, and Telluride, earning both critical and audience acclaim.

His breakthrough project, The Eyes of Me (2009), documented the lives of visually impaired teenagers and earned a Barbara Jordan Media Award and an Emmy nomination.

His inspiration for Tower came from the want of preserving history. In high school, he took a required Texas history class. It was his teacher who told them about the shooting because she was a UT student at the time. The way his teacher told the story was so mesmerizing that it stuck with him. However, it wasn't until he read Pamela Colloff's 96 Minutes that he started thinking of making it an animated re-telling. Maitland wanted to focus on the how: "How does one survive and live after a traumatic event?"

Maitland's deep connection to Austin's music and cultural landscape inspired him to document the story of the PBS music program, Austin City Limits. The film captures the spirit of ACL's intimate performances and its ability to bridge audiences and artists.

In 2021, Maitland directed Dear Mr. Brody, a documentary exploring the story of 1970s news sensation, Michael Brody Jr. and his pledge to give away 25 million dollars. This film further cemented Maitland's reputation for blending emotionally impactful narratives with visual innovation.
