= Leigh Goodmark =

American author and activist

Leigh Goodmark is a lawyer, author, and professor at the University of Maryland Francis King Carey School of Law whose research focuses on intimate partner and domestic violence. She is a feminist and a prison abolitionist.

== Activism and work ==
Goodmark has advocated for legislative changes that affect the sentencing outcomes for criminalized survivors and for policy changes that affect how domestic violence cases are handled. She has spoken at an Oklahoma interim study alongside others like Colleen McCarty to advocate for sentencing reform for their incarcerated survivors. Goodmark argues that current systems fail to decrease or prevent violence and instead often punishes the victims. She has published work highlighting that legislative change is often not enough for criminalized survivors, who at best get reduced sentencing but does not correct the systemic problems. Goodmark believes that intimate partner violence can't be addressed through a carceral system. She believes that "abolition feminism" is what can challenge and upend "the notion that carceral structures, such as policing and prison, can still be used to address gender violence".

She has offered free workshop trainings for other domestic violence advocates.

== Notable published works ==
Her work has been featured in outlets like Truthout and Inquest.

=== Books ===
- A Troubled Marriage: Domestic Violence and the Legal System, 2013.
- Comparative Perspectives on Gender Violence: Lessons From Efforts Worldwide, 2015.
- Decriminalizing Domestic Violence: A Balanced Policy Approach to Intimate Partner Violence, 2018.
- Imperfect Victims: Criminalized Survivors and the Promise of Abolition Feminism (Gender and Justice), 2023.

=== Articles ===
- "Law Is the Answer? Do We Know That for Sure?: Questioning the Efficacy of Legal Interventions for Battered Women", 2004.
- "Hands Up at Home: Militarized Masculinity and Police Officers Who Commit Intimate Partner Abuse", 2015

== Personal life ==
She has a JD from Stanford Law School and also attended Yale. She used to be the Director of the Clinical Education and Family Law Clinic and Co-Director of the Center on Applied Feminism at the University of Baltimore School of Law but is currently "a member of the Editorial Board of Violence Against Women and a member of the advisory board for the Appalachian Justice Research Center."

She began her career by "representing battered women, convinced that she could protect them through policing, protective orders, prosecution, and prison. Now she argues that the legal system does not make abused women safer".
