= Steven Thrasher =

American writer and editor

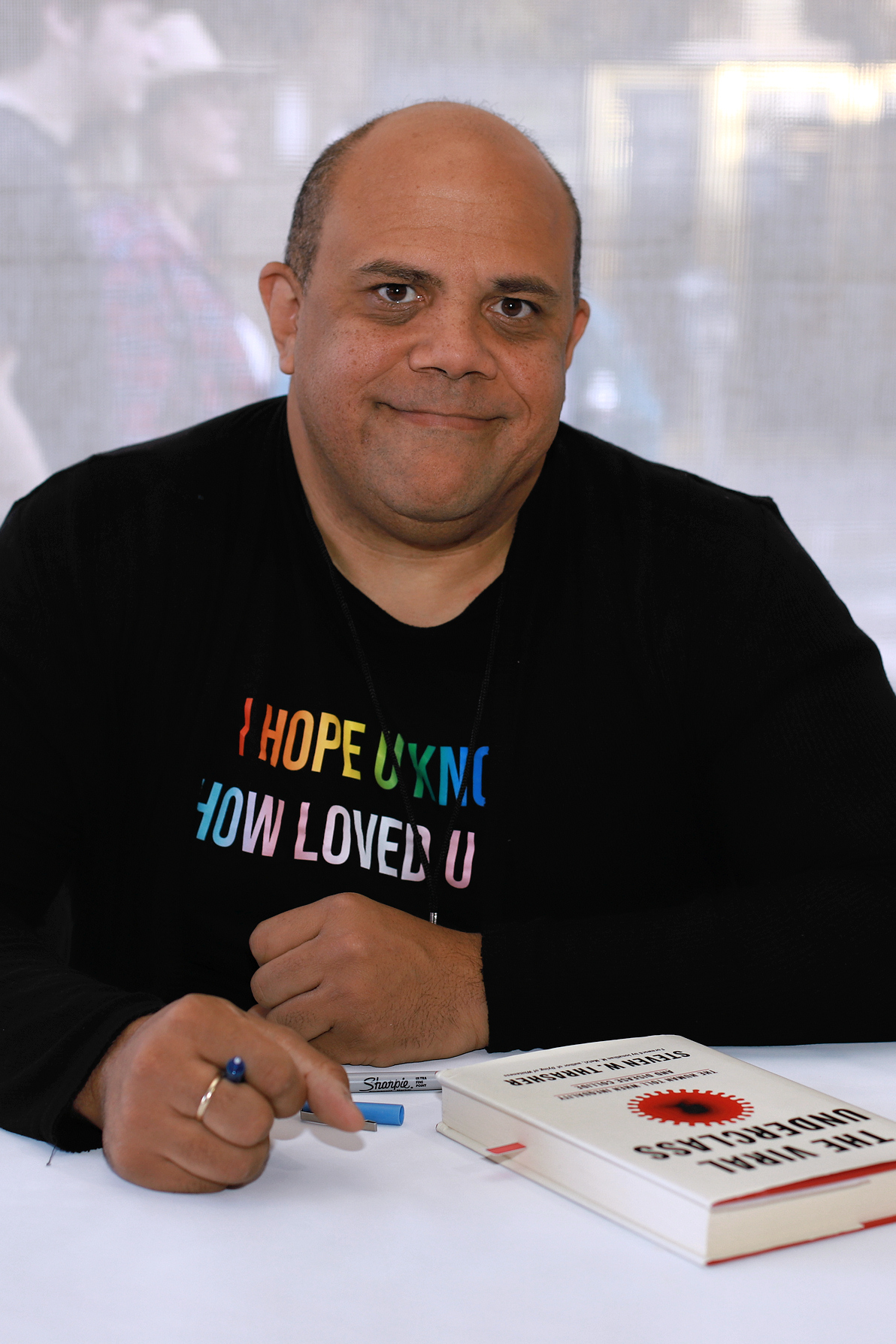
- Thrasher at the 2022 Texas Book Festival
- Born: Ventura, California, U.S.
- Education: New York University
- Occupations: Journalist, academic
- Employer: Northwestern University (BFA)
- Notable work: The Viral Underclass
- Title: Daniel H. Renberg Chair of social justice in reporting
- Awards: NLGJA Journalist of the Year award, 2012

Steven William Thrasher (born c. 1978) is an American journalist and academic. In 2019, he became the inaugural Daniel H. Renberg Chair of social justice in reporting and an assistant professor of journalism at Northwestern University's Medill School of Journalism. In 2012, he won the National Lesbian and Gay Journalists Association Journalist of the Year award. His first book, The Viral Underclass, was published in 2022. His second, The Overseer Class, was published in 2026.

== Early life ==
Steven Thrasher was born circa 1978 in Ventura, California, and grew up in Oxnard, California . His parents, Margaret (d. 2007) and William "Bill" Thrasher (d. 2003), were white and Black respectively, and left Nebraska to marry in Iowa in 1958 because Nebraska law at the time barred the marriage.

Thrasher attended Oxnard High School where his father was a teacher. He graduated in 1995, then earned a BFA from New York University Tisch School of the Arts.

== Career ==
After graduating from Tisch, Thrasher worked as a script assistant on Saturday Night Live from 1999–2001, before working on the crews of several films including HBO Films' The Laramie Project. Beginning in 2007, he worked as an interviewer collecting oral histories for the StoryCorps Project, before becoming a staff writer at The Village Voice in 2009. In 2012, Thrasher was laid off from the Voice. He continued as a freelance journalist while working toward a doctorate in American studies from New York University in 2019. Thrasher's journalism has also appeared in The Guardian, Scientific American, The New York Times, and BuzzFeed.

In 2014, Thrasher was approached to investigate the story of Michael "Tiger Mandingo" Johnson, a young Black gay man near St. Louis who was HIV-positive had been charged with "recklessly" exposing six sexual partners to the virus, two of whom contracted it. Thrasher published a series of articles arguing that Johnson's conviction had been racially charged. In 2016, Johnson's conviction was overturned on appeal because prosecutors had failed to disclose key evidence (jailhouse recordings of Johnson saying he was only "pretty sure" he'd told partners about his HIV status) on the first day of trial. He accepted an Alford plea of no contest and his original sentence of 30.5 years was reduced to ten; Johnson was released after serving five years. Thrasher's coverage argued that HIV legislation reinforced stigma against patients and disincentivized people from getting tested, and how those affected by HIV criminalization, like Johnson, were often given unfair sentences. His work led to his recognition as one of Out magazine's Out100 in 2019.

Thrasher also returned to St. Louis in 2014 to cover the uprisings after the killing of Michael Brown in Ferguson.

He was the recipient of the National Lesbian and Gay Journalists Association Journalist of the Year award 2012, and the Al Neuharth Award for Innovation in Investigative Journalism 2015. In 2017, he was inducted into the Hall of Fame for the American Sociological Association's journal Contexts, and in 2019, he was awarded a $75,000 Creativity and Free Expression grant from the Ford Foundation.

In 2019, Thrasher was appointed the inaugural Daniel H. Renberg Chair of social justice in reporting and an assistant professor of journalism at Northwestern University's Medill School of Journalism. As the student speaker at the 2019 convocation ceremony for NYU's Graduate School of Arts and Sciences, Thrasher expressed support for the Boycott, Divestment and Sanctions movement "against the apartheid state government in Israel". NYU president Andrew Hamilton, calling the speech "quite objectionable," said Thrasher had omitted these comments from the version of the speech submitted for review.

In July 2024, Thrasher and three other Northwestern community members - including a fellow professor, a librarian, and a graduate student - were arrested by the Northwestern University Police Department and charged with allegedly obstructing law enforcement during a pro-Palestinian encampment on the university's campus that April. The charges, which were misdemeanors, carried a potential sentence of a year in prison and a fine of US$2,500. All of the charges against Thrasher and the other educators were dropped by the Office of the Cook County State's Attorney on July 19, 2024. Thrasher was briefly suspended with pay from teaching classes while a university committee investigated complaints regarding his journalistic objectivity; he announced via a press release that he had been reinstated in January 2025. Northwestern denied Thrasher tenure in March 2025. He will stop teaching at NU in August 2026. Thrasher said he plans to appeal the decision

=== The Viral Underclass ===
In August 2022, Thrasher published The Viral Underclass: The Human Toll When Inequality and Disease Collide with Celadon Books, an imprint of Macmillan. In it, Thrasher presents a series of case studies to argue that structural inequality increases the effect of viruses like HIV and COVID-19 on marginalized groups like people of color, disabled people, and LGBT people. The book received a starred review in Publishers Weekly. In The Boston Globe, Jennifer Latson called The Viral Underclass an "engaging, enraging read." In Nature, Jennifer Hochschild wrote, "Thrasher is an excellent investigator. The reader sees how and why the narratives develop in particular ways, and feels fury and despair, as well as occasional glimmers of hope. But the stories also leave lots of questions."

=== The Overseer Class ===
In 2026, Thrasher published The Overseer Class: A Manifesto with HarperCollins. He discussed this book in an interview with Victoria Law for The Nation.
