= Pamela Colloff =

American journalist

- Education: Brown University
- Occupation: Journalist
- Employer(s): ProPublica, The New York Times Magazine
- Awards: National Magazine Award (2013, 2020)

Pamela Colloff is an American journalist. She is a reporter at ProPublica and a staff writer at The New York Times Magazine. Additionally, she has contributed to The New Yorker, as well as Texas Monthly, where she was formerly an executive editor.

Colloff has won the National Magazine Award twice: in 2013 for Feature Writing Incorporating Profile Writing, and in 2020 for Reporting.

== Early life and education ==
Colloff and her brother, David, were raised in Manhattan. Her father, Roger D. Colloff, was the vice president and general manager of WCBS-TV in New York City, and her mother, Margery A. Colloff, is counsel to a law firm.

Colloff began writing when she was 17 years old and interviewed Allen Ginsberg when he visited her high school. The transcript was published in an "alternative newspaper" that Colloff and others published during their senior year of high school.

Colloff then attended Brown University. Since it didn't offer a journalism degree, she majored in English literature instead, completing several independent studies in which she focused on long-form journalism. Some of her stories were published in a now-defunct college magazine and later picked up by the Associated Press.

== Career ==
After college, Colloff moved to Austin, Texas, and sought freelancing opportunities. She wrote for Texas Highway Patrol, a local trade magazine, and also published stories in Might and Details. In 1997, she began working for Texas Monthly as a staff writer, later becoming its executive editor. In 2017, she joined ProPublica, and The New York Times Magazine, in a joint reporting partnership.

Colloff's first book, Catch the Devil: A True Story of Murder, Deception, and Injustice on the Gulf Coast was released July 2026. It received a starred review from Kirkus Reviews which called it a "fiery indictment of a system that rewards jailbird snitches for 'telling just the right story.'"

=== "Innocence Lost" and "Innocence Found" ===
Colloff's two-part story, "Innocence Lost" and "Innocence Found," published from 2010 to 2011, details the case of death row inmate Anthony Charles Graves, who was wrongly convicted in 1992 for the murder of a family in Somerville, Texas. One month after Colloff published "Innocence Lost," the Burleson County District Attorney's Office dropped all charges against Graves and released him after 18 years of incarceration.

=== "The Innocent Man" ===
Colloff's two-part 2013 story, "The Innocent Man," details the case of Michael Morton, who was wrongly convicted for the murder of his wife in 1986. After being incarcerated for 25 years, Morton was released, and Colloff subsequently won a National Magazine Award for her reporting.

The story was originally meant to be published as one cohesive piece, but Colloff's editor suggested breaking the story into two parts when the story reached 16,000 words.

=== "96 Minutes" ===
Colloff's 2006 story, "96 Minutes," collected dozens of quotations from survivors and witnesses of the 1966 University of Texas tower shooting. It inspired Keith Maitland's 2016 documentary film Tower.

=== Oklahoma Survivors' Act ===
Colloff's 2026 stories about the Oklahoma Survivors' Act observed a new law that allowed survivors of domestic violence to ask for reduced sentences if their crimes were partly motivated by the abuse they faced. It inspired Colleen McCarty to run against the Tulsa incumbent known for fighting against those cases.

== Works ==
- Catch the Devil: A True Story of Murder, Deception, and Injustice on the Gulf Coast. Knopf. July 14, 2026. ISBN 9780593230862.

== Awards ==
Year	Award	Category	Recipient	Result	Ref
2001	National Magazine Awards	Public Interest	"They Haven't Got a Prayer"	Nominated	
2010	Sidney Awards	October Sidney	"Innocence Lost" and "Innocence Found"	Won	
2011	National Magazine Awards	Public Interest	"Innocence Lost" and "Innocence Found"	Nominated	
2013	National Magazine Awards	Feature Writing Incorporating Profile Writing	"The Innocent Man"	Won	
2013	National Magazine Awards	Public Interest	"Hannah and Andrew"	Nominated	
2013	Louis M. Lyons Award for Conscience and Integrity in Journalism		Pamela Colloff	Won	
2015	National Magazine Awards	Feature Writing	"The Witness"	Nominated	
2017	National Magazine Awards	Feature Writing	"The Reckoning"	Nominated	
2020	National Magazine Awards	Reporting	"False Witness"	Won	
2026	Kirkus Prize	Nonfiction	Catch the Devil	Finalist	

== Personal life ==
In 2005, Colloff married Chad Davidson Nichols. Together, they live in Austin with their two children.

Colloff is of Jewish descent.
