= Turkeys voting for Christmas =

Idiom

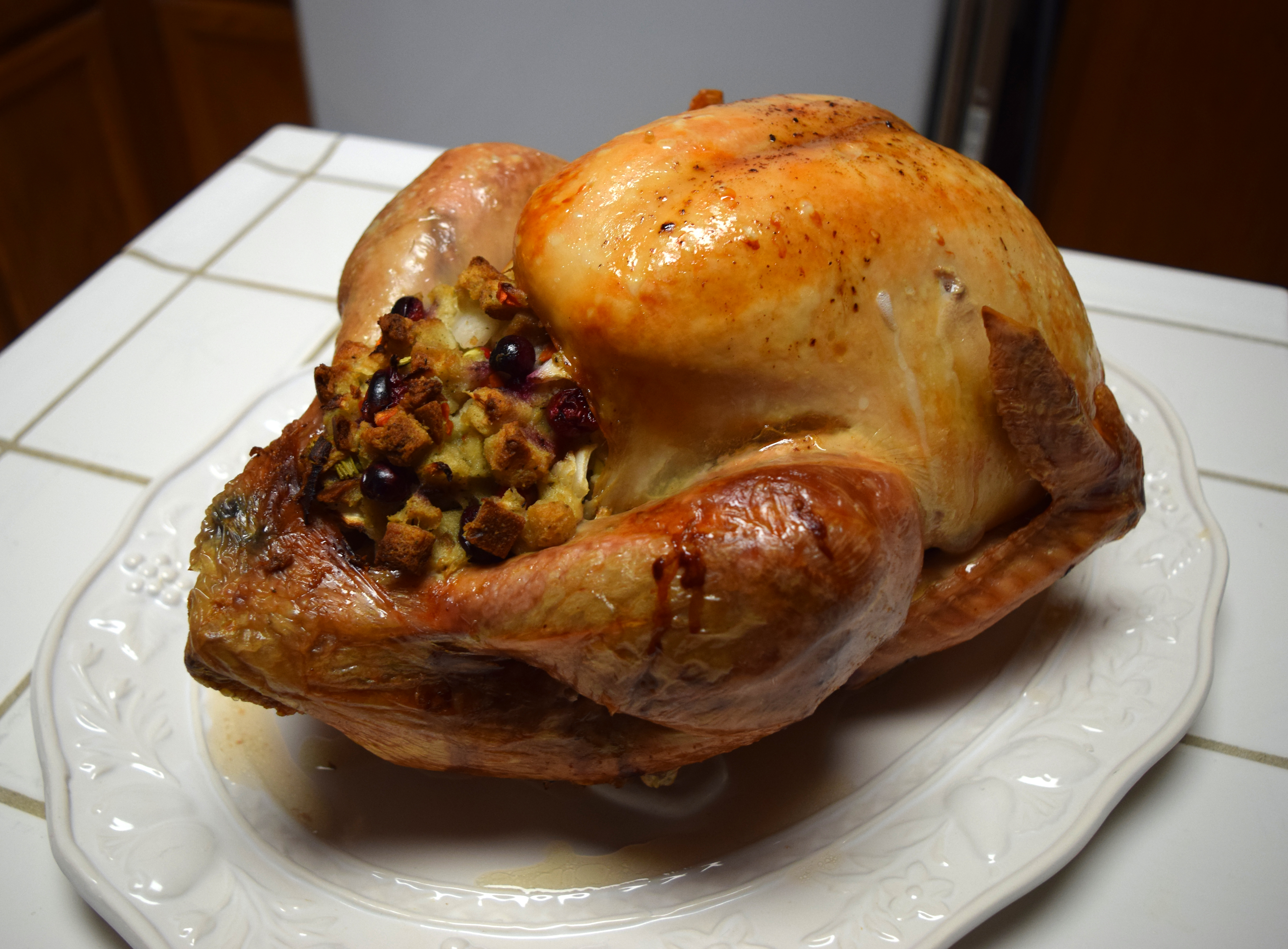
Christmas turkey

Turkeys voting for Christmas is an English idiom used as a metaphor for a situation in which a choice made is clearly against one's self-interest. In the United Kingdom, turkeys are commonly eaten as part of the English Christmas dinner. "Chickens for Colonel Sanders" is a similar phrase used in the United States and Canada.

== History ==
The Oxford Dictionary of Humorous Quotations writes that a commentator in the Independent Magazine traced the origin of the phrase to British Liberal Party politician David Penhaligon, who is quoted as saying: "Us voting for the Pact is like a turkey voting for Christmas" in reference to the 1977 Lib–Lab pact which he opposed.

The phrase was soon borrowed by other politicians and public figures. In 1979, Labour Prime Minister James Callaghan was faced with a vote of no confidence called by Scottish National Party, who were upset with Labour's treatment of the recent Scottish devolution referendum. In the resulting vote the Scottish nationalists sided with the Conservative opposition against the Labour government, despite the fact that the Conservatives opposed devolution. During his speech, Callaghan stated that "If they win, there will be a general election. I am told that the current joke going around the House is that it is the first time in recorded history that turkeys have been known to vote for an early Christmas." The Scottish National Party ultimately lost most of its representation in the resulting election. In 2000, British MP Teresa Gorman, who opposed the Maastricht Treaty, stated; "If the House of Commons voted for Maastricht it would be like 651 turkeys voting for Christmas."

== Similar idioms ==
In the United States, the phrases "turkeys voting for Thanksgiving", the holiday when turkey is more commonly served there, and "Chickens for Colonel Sanders", referring to the founder of the fast food restaurant KFC, are often used. In Canada, the story of Mouseland has mice voting for cats. A similar German idiom is "Only the most stupid calves would vote for their butchers" ("Nur die dümmsten Kälber wählen ihre Metzger selber"). Bertold Brecht alluded to it in his Kälbermarsch ("March of the calves", 1933), a parody of the Nazi anthem "Horst Wessel Song", which was included in his play Schweik in the Second World War (1943). A similar photomontage of John Heartfield shows Hitler as a butcher with a chicken and the caption "Don't panic! He's a vegetarian."

In 2015, Twitter user Adrian Bott posted the viral tweet, "'I never thought leopards would eat my face,' sobs woman who voted for the Leopards Eating People's Faces Party". The expression has since become idiomatic of people who face adverse consequences of policies considered authoritarian, cruel or unjust that they supported. A popular 2016 New Yorker cartoon by Paul Noth portrays a sheep viewing a billboard of a wolf political candidate whose campaign slogan is "I am going to eat you", and approvingly remarking "He tells it like it is."

=== Chickens for Colonel Sanders ===
The phrase "Chickens for Colonel Sanders" (or "Chickens defending KFC") has been used by various politicians in different scenarios, such as in 1978 by Canadian politician Steven W. Langdon, NDP candidate for the Ottawa Centre federal electoral district, when making the comparison with the district voting for the Progressive Conservative Party, and in 2016 by U.S. lawmaker and representative Keith Ellison (D-Minn) using the phrase in comparison to Muslims voting for Donald Trump. Commentator Thomas Frank also cited an example of its use as a rhetorical tool of the grassroots conservative movement in the United States in the early 21st century.

During the Gaza war, the phrase "Chickens for KFC" has been used by some sources as an analogy for the position of LGBT people supporting the state of Palestine, due to widespread stigmatization of LGBT people in the State of Palestine in addition to the criminalization of male same-sex sexual activity in the Gaza Strip. Israeli prime minister Benjamin Netanyahu has used the phrase to parody the slogan "Gays for Gaza", including on his 2024 address to U.S. Congress and on a July 2025 edition of Nelk's Full Send Podcast.

== See also ==
- False consciousness
- The Woodcutter and the Trees
- Useful idiot
