= Truthout =

American non profit news organization

- Formation: 2001; 25 years ago
- Type: 501(c)(3) organization
- Tax ID no.: 20-0031641
- Legal status: Non-profit
- Headquarters: Sacramento, California
- Employees: 25
- Website: truthout.org

Truthout is an American non-profit news organization that reports news from a left-wing perspective with its main areas of focus including: mass incarceration, prison abolition advocacy, social justice, climate change, militarism, economics, open borders, U.S. LGBTQ+ rights, and reproductive justice.

Truthout's senior leadership team consists of the executive director, Ziggy West Jeffery, and the editor-in-chief, Negin Owliaei. The organization's annual operating budget was approximately $2.2 million in 2021.

== History ==
=== Founding ===
Truthout was founded in 2001 following the 2000 United States presidential election results. By 2006, the organization had thirty employees.

=== Controversial reporting on Karl Rove ===
On May 13, 2006, journalist Jason Leopold reported on Truthout that Karl Rove had been indicted by a grand jury investigating the Plame affair. Rove's spokesperson, Mark Corallo, denied the report.

Truthout defended the story, stating that it was based on multiple sources which indicated that an indictment had been issued or presented to Rove’s attorneys. The grand jury later concluded its investigation without returning an indictment against Rove.

Rove addressed the report in his memoir, Courage and Consequence, criticizing the article and stating that Special Counsel Patrick Fitzgerald regarded the account as inaccurate.

Leopold continued to publish investigative reporting for Truthout through 2014, and joined Vice News later that year.

=== Reporting on the Bush administration's interrogation techniques ===
A 2009 report by Truthout on the Bush administration's use of enhanced interrogation techniques was cited by Countdown with Keith Olbermann and by Carl Levin, chairman of the U.S. Senate Committee on Armed Services.

=== Unionization ===
In 2009, Truthout became the first online-only news website to unionize.

About a dozen Truthout employees became members of the NewsGuild-CWA Local 36047, and Truthout remains a unionized workplace today.

=== Safety issues at BP ===
The CBS news program 60 Minutes cited a report published on Truthout as a source for its May 16, 2010, episode covering the BP oil spill and the whistleblower who warned about a possible blowout at another BP deepwater drilling site. Digital Journal wrote up the story. CNN's Randi Kaye, in an article, cited a report by Truthout as the first article on BP Alaska employee Mark Kovac's inside knowledge about the safety concerns at the Prudhoe Bay, Alaska BP oil field. On July 14, 2010, the United States House of Representatives Committee on Transportation and Infrastructure held a hearing in the Subcommittee on Railroads, Pipelines, and Hazardous Materials. The hearing titled "The Safety of Hazardous Liquid Pipelines (Part 2): Integrity Management" cited an investigative report by Truthout as a document for the committee's investigation.

=== 2011 hack ===
In 2011, Truthout suffered a hacking breach in which ten days' worth of articles were deleted.

=== Offshore fracking ===
In 2013, Truthout journalist Mike Ludwig unearthed information through a Freedom of Information Act request from the Interior Department revealing that fracking technology was being used on offshore oil rigs in the ecologically sensitive Santa Barbara Channel. Coastal conservationists took note of this, and environmentalists took action, generating protests and broad public discussion about offshore fracking. At one point, lawsuits filed by environmental groups forced federal officials to place a moratorium on offshore fracking in the channel while regulators reviewed the practice and their rules for making it safe. In 2014, the EPA issued new rules requiring offshore drillers to disclose fracking chemicals they dispose of into the ocean off the California coast.

=== Illegal Navy training ===
In 2016, Dahr Jamail and Truthout released Navy documents outlining plans for combat training exercises in vast non-military areas of Washington state's coastline. The documents showed the areas the Navy was prepared to utilize, without the mandatory risk assessments, medical plans, surveys of training areas, and coordinating their activities with local, state, and federal law enforcement officials. The release of these documents forced the Navy to postpone this training for at least 2 years. It caused commotion within the Washington state government, as they were unaware of the Navy's plans.

=== 2017 riot charges ===
Freelancer and Truthout writer Aaron Miguel Cantú was one of the six journalists faced with felony rioting charges after covering the inauguration of Donald Trump. In July 2018, all charges against Cantu and many of the other protesters were dismissed.

=== 2025 acquisitions ===
On June 11, 2025, Truthout acquired Yes! Magazine's archive following its closure. On November 14, 2025, Truthout acquired the assets of The Appeal, a criminal justice-focused news site.

== Content and partnerships ==
=== Truthout Center for Grassroots Journalism ===
In 2023, Truthout launched the Truthout Center for Grassroots Journalism, a program that aims to offer assistance to small and emerging progressive news organizations to "help grow the critical media ecosystem necessary to build grassroots power." Truthout provides these organizations with guidance on growth and sustainability, consults on editorial and business strategy, and provides access to resources such as development databases. Maya Schenwar, Truthout's editor-at-large and former editor-in-chief, serves as the center's director.

Explaining why Truthout founded the center, Schenwar explains, "We want to exist as a publication, but we can't do it alone. We don't want to be anyone's sole news source. We want to have this vibrant ecosystem of different publications that are helping enrich people's understanding of the world, and propel them toward action on all these different fronts."

Through the center, Truthout also collaborates on editorial projects with other progressive news organizations, including Zealous, Teen Vogue, Inquest, and Deceleration. A 2023 series, created in collaboration with Truthout, Zealous, and Teen Vogue, about alternatives to incarceration won a 2024 Anthem Award.

=== Media Against Apartheid and Displacement ===
In March 2024, through its Center for Grassroots Journalism, Truthout co-founded Media Against Apartheid and Displacement (MAAD), a website that serves as a hub for articles published by progressive media organizations about the Israel-Gaza war and about Palestinian resistance to the Israeli occupation. Reporting and analysis are from an anti-Zionist perspective.

The project includes articles published by Prism, Truthout, In These Times, Mondoweiss, Institute for Palestine Studies, Haymarket Books, The Real News Network, The Forge, Waging Nonviolence, The Dig, The Kansas City Defender, Briarpatch, Baltimore Beat, Hammer & Hope, Scalawag, Convergence Magazine, and Analyst News.

=== Keeley Schenwar Memorial Essay Prize ===
The Truthout Center for Grassroots Journalism coordinates the Keeley Schenwar Memorial Essay Prize for personal essays by incarcerated and formerly incarcerated authors. The prize is named after Truthout's editor-at-large and former editor-in-chief Maya Schenwar's sister, who was incarcerated on and off over the course of 14 years before she died of an overdose in 2020. Keeley Schenwar wrote for Truthout about her incarceration, including giving birth while in prison.

Each year, two winners are awarded $3,000 in prizes, and the essays are published on Truthout's website. The prize was first awarded in 2021.

== Awards ==
=== Martha Gellhorn Prize for Journalism ===
In 2012, Truthout journalist Gareth Porter was awarded the Martha Gellhorn Prize for Journalism for his work uncovering the Obama administration's military strategy in Afghanistan. "In a series of extraordinary articles, Gareth Porter has torn away the facades of the Obama administration and disclosed a military strategy that amounts to a war against civilians." Amongst Porter's award-winning stories were 'How McChrystal and Petraeus built an Indiscriminate "Killing Machine,' and 'The Lies That Sold Obama's Escalation in Afghanistan'.

=== Society of Professional Journalists' Sigma Delta Chi Awards ===
Maya Schenwar was awarded in the 2013 Online Column Writing category by the Society of Professional Journalists Sigma Delta Chi Awards for her columns on mass incarceration, the death penalty, and solitary confinement.

=== San Francisco Press Club Journalism Awards ===
A joint Truthout and Earth Island Journal investigation, "America's Toxic Prisons" by Candice Bernd, Zoe Loftus-Farren, and Maureen Nandini Mitra won awards in two categories of the 2018 San Francisco Press Club Journalism Awards. The investigation won second place in the Magazines category for environment/nature reporting and investigative reporting.

=== 2018 Izzy Award ===
Dahr Jamail, a Truthout journalist, was awarded the 2018 Izzy Award for achievements in independent media for his reporting on climate change and other environmental issues. The judges wrote: "There is an urgency and passion in Dahr Jamail's reporting that is justified by the literally earth-changing subject matter. And it's supported by science and on-the-scene sources, whether covering ocean pollution, sea level rise, deafening noise pollution, or Fukushima radiation."

Jamail produces a monthly wrap-up of the latest climate research and trends – "Climate Disruption Dispatches".

=== 2021 Izzy Award ===
The thirteenth annual Izzy Award was awarded to non-profit news outlet Truthout, journalist Liliana Segura, senior reporter at The Intercept, and journalist Tim Schwab, writing in The Nation.

=== Donald F. Erickson Synapses Award ===
In 2022, the Crossroads Fund presented the Donald F. Erickson Synapses Award to Truthout for independent reporting and commentary on a diverse range of topics related to social justice.

=== 2024 Anthem Award ===
A 2024 Anthem Award in the category of News & Journalism was awarded to "Remaking the Exceptional", a series of explainer videos made through a collaboration between Truthout, Zealous, and Teen Vogue that covered myths about and alternatives to policing and incarceration.

== Staff ==
Truthout's executive director is Ziggy West Jeffery, and the editor-in-chief is Negin Owliaei.

Truthout's Board of Directors includes Maya Schenwar, McMaster University professor and educational theorist Henry A. Giroux, and Lewis R. Gordon.

Truthout's Board of Advisors includes Mark Ruffalo, Dean Baker, Richard D. Wolff, William Ayers, and Mark Weisbrot. The late Howard Zinn was a member of the advisory board.

The late William Rivers Pitt was Truthout's senior editor and lead columnist.
