= Bolts (magazine) =

Bolts is a digital, nonprofit American magazine that launched in February 2022. It covers topics such as criminal justice, election administration, elections, and institutions that shape public policy, with a focus on local and state politics. Daniel Nichanian is the founder and editor-in-chief. Bolts operates through philanthropic grants and individual donations.

A feature of their site is a resource called "What's On the Ballot," which contains guides to elections and local institutions and tries to be "a cheat sheet of elections everywhere."

== Content and contributors ==
Articles on Bolts have covered issues of policing, gerrymandering, prison conditions, voting rights.

Bolts founder Daniel Nichanian says that the publication is for "journalists who have specific beats and might face trouble translating their beats into local hotspots, or policymakers, advocates and activists already interested in criminal justice or voting rights." Contributors include managing editor Michael Barajas, legal journalist Chris Geidner, and anarchist writer Victoria Law.
