= Queers Undermining Israeli Terrorism =

U.S. political action group

Queers Undermining Israeli Terrorism (QUIT!) is a San Francisco Bay Area-based queer political action group that advocates for boycott, divestment, and sanctions against the State of Israel while opposing the Israel's pinkwashing and ethnic cleansing of Palestinians. The group was founded in early 2001 by a member of LAGAI-Queer Insurrection.

== Goals ==
QUIT activists outside Macy's San Francisco store on Valentine's Day, 2004. Banner says, "Killer Products from Estée Slaughter", referring to Estée Lauder Companies.

The group advocates for the Boycott, Divestment and Sanctions movement, the right of return for Palestinians, and the withdrawal of Israel from the occupied Palestinian territories. It characterizes Zionism as a form of racism.

QUIT! opposes pinkwashing, which it defines as the use of LGBTQ rights to promote Israel’s anti-Palestinian policies.

Critics have questioned the group's stance in relation to LGBTQ rights in the State of Palestine.

== Activities ==
=== Protests/campaigns ===
- February 2002—QUIT! participated in the National Student Conference of the Palestine Solidarity Movement on the Berkeley campus of the University of California.
- June 2002—QUIT! "initiated" a " 'No pride in occupation' anti-war contingent that marched in solidarity with the Palestinian people" in San Francisco's Lesbian, Gay, Bisexual and Transgender Pride March.
- August 2002—25 members of the group reportedly "took over" a Starbucks in Berkeley in protest of the firm's stores in Israel and CEO Howard Schultz's support for Israel.
- June 2003—The screening of an Israeli film, Yossi & Jagger, at San Francisco's San Francisco International Lesbian and Gay Film Festival is disrupted by QUIT! activists. The protest "outraged" Yossi Amrani, the Israeli Consul General and caused a minor local media flap.
- June 2003—QUIT! begins its campaign against the cosmetic company Estée Lauder outside of a Macy's department store in San Francisco. The company is targeted because of Ronald Lauder's, the company's founder, support for Israel and his service as president of the Jewish National Fund.
- In 2004, the Estee Lauder Companies boycott campaign titled "Estee Slaughter" was financed, in part, by a $1500 grant from RESIST.
- In December of 2023, QUIT! protested from the Castro District to San Francisco City Hall calling for a permanent cease-fire in the Israel-Hamas war.

=== Founder arrested in West Bank and Israel ===
In December, 2004, one of QUIT!'s founders, Jewish activist Kate Raphael, was arrested by Israeli authorities while "filming a clash between Israeli soldiers and activists protesting the building of the separation barrier in the West Bank village of Bil'in." Raphael had also been arrested in Israel and deported in 2003 "for filming the Israel Defense Forces' reaction to a demonstration against the barrier." As a result of her arrest, QUIT! staged a protest outside the Israeli Consulate in San Francisco.

=== Boycott World Pride Jerusalem ===
In late 2004, in response to Interpride's decision that the Israeli group Jerusalem Open House would host the second World Pride parade in 2005, QUIT! launched a Boycott World Pride campaign. The boycott picked up steam after the event was postponed until August 2006 because of the pullout of the Israeli settlements from the Gaza Strip. QUIT and many other individuals and organizations contended that it was inappropriate to hold an event titled "Love Without Borders" in a city bisected by a 30-foot concrete wall. The International Gay and Lesbian Human Rights Commission (IGLHRC) decided, in March 2006, not to participate in World Pride Jerusalem, stating, "IGLHRC recognizes that many LGBTI people in the region who wish to attend World Pride 2006, named 'Love without Borders,' will be unable to do so due to travel restrictions and conditions that limit mobility and participation."

=== San Francisco LGBT Film Festival ===
In an open letter signed by more than 100 artists and writers, including Sophie Fiennes, Elia Suleiman, Ken Loach, Haim Bresheeth, Jenny Morgan, John Berger, Arundhati Roy, Ahdaf Soueif, Eduardo Galeano, Brian Eno, and Leon Rosselson, Frameline was asked "to honor calls for an international boycott of Israeli political and cultural institutions, by discontinuing Israeli consulate sponsorship of the LGBT film festival and not cosponsoring events with the Israeli consulate."

== See also ==
- LGBTQ in Israel
- Zionism as settler colonialism
- Palestinian genocide accusation
