= The Kansas City Defender =

News outlet targeted to African-American youth

Kansas City Defender

- Owner: Institute for Nonprofit News
- Founder: Ryan Sorrell
- Publisher: Ryan Sorrell
- Founded: July 2021
- City: Kansas City metropolitan area
- Country: United States
- Website: kansascitydefender.com

The Kansas City Defender is a news outlet primarily by and for African-American youth, especially in the Kansas City metropolitan area and the Midwestern United States more generally. They won the 2022 Community Engagement Award from Local Independent Online News (LION) Publishers for "engaging Black youth both in digital spaces, and real-life community events. Their stories on racism in schools sparked national coverage and conversations. Among other things, they work to understand the differences between the different audiences on different social media platforms and how to tailor their content to maximize the engagement of those different audiences.

Kansas City Defender founder and publisher, Ryan Sorrell, insists, "young people are not unreachable. They are very interested in news. It just has to be produced and packaged the right way for them to be interested in consuming it". Defender community engagement efforts have included basketball park takeovers and grocery buyouts. Among other things, they speak directly to high school age youth, writing about them and their concerns and inviting them to contribute content.

In 2025, the nonprofit began fundraising to purchase Willa’s Books and Vinyl, the oldest Black-owned bookstore in Missouri, to turn it into a public archive and its headquarters.

In August 2025, they partnered with KC Black Urban Growers and the Ivanhoe Neighborhood Council to start the Hamer Free Food Program after the closure of a Black-owned grocery store led to a neighborhood becoming a food desert. The program was named after Fannie Lou Hamer.

== Disappearing women ==
On September 23, 2022, The Kansas City Defender published a video on TikTok claiming that Black women had been disappearing off Prospect Avenue, and nothing was being done about it. The following Monday the Kansas City, Missouri, Police Department said they had heard nothing about this. News outlets in Kansas City and across the nation, including Newsweek and the Atlanta Black Star, chastised The Kansas City Defender for irresponsible journalism.

Two weeks later, before 8 AM on October 7, 2022, a woman began running around Excelsior Springs, Missouri, knocking on doors and crying for help. She said she had been held against her will, beaten, and sexually assaulted. She also said there had been other victims. Police found the house in which the woman said she had been confined and staked out the place. An hour later, the owner, Timothy Haslett, Jr., returned and was arrested. Haslett was charged with crimes involving multiple women and charges including rape and kidnapping. In 2024, after a body was found, he was indicted for murder.
