= Blast =

Blast or The Blast most often refers to:

- Explosion, a rapid increase in volume and release of energy in an extreme manner
- Detonation, an exothermic front accelerating through a medium that eventually drives a shock front
- A planned explosion in a mine, quarry or other situation in order to fragment rock

Blast or The Blast may also refer to:

== Film ==
- Blast (1997 film), starring Andrew Divoff
- Blast (2000 film), starring Liesel Matthews
- Blast (2004 film), an action comedy
- Blast! (1972 film) or The Final Comedown, an American drama
- BLAST! (2008 film), a documentary about the BLAST telescope
- A Blast, a 2014 film directed by Syllas Tzoumerkas
- Blast (2026 film), a 2026 Indian film

== Magazines ==
- Blast (British magazine), a 1914–15 literary magazine of the Vorticist movement
- Blast (U.S. magazine), a 1933–34 American short-story magazine
- The Blast (magazine), a 1916–17 American anarchist periodical

== Music ==
- Blast (American band), a hardcore punk band
- Blast (Russian band), an indie band
- Blxst, an American rapper
- Blast, a Danish band with which Hanne Boel performed
- Blast (album), by Holly Johnson, 1989
- The Blast (album), by Yuvan Shankar Raja, 1999
- "The Blast" (song), by Reflection Eternal, 2001
- "Blast", a song by Momoiro Clover Z, 2017
- Blast beat, a type of drum beat

== Science and technology ==
- BLAST (protocol), file transfer software
- BLAST (telescope), Balloon-borne Large Aperture Submillimeter Telescope
- BLAST (biotechnology), Basic Local Alignment Search Tool, an algorithm used in bioinformatics
- Blast cell or precursor cell, in cytology, a type of partially differentiated, usually unipotent cell
- Blast disease, a disease of cereal crops
- Blast injury, a complex type of physical trauma resulting from direct or indirect exposure to an explosion
- BLAST network, a proposed rapid transit system for Hamilton, Ontario, Canada
- Bell Laboratories Layered Space-Time, a transceiver architecture
- FreeX Blast, a German paraglider design

== Other ==
- Blast! (comics), a 1991 British comic
- Blast! (musical), a 2001 Broadway musical
- Blast! Entertainment, a defunct video game developer and publisher
- C. L. Blast (1934–2016), recording name of Clarence Lewis
- Bangladesh Legal Aid and Services Trust
- Bus Line Service of Turlock (BLAST), the former name for the public bus service operated by Turlock Transit in Turlock, California, US
- Blast Premier, a Counter-Strike esports league
- Blast TV, a Philippine Internet-based TV and streaming service
- Blast (African TV channel), a television channel in Angola and Mozambique

== See also ==
- Blaster (disambiguation)
- Blasting (disambiguation)
- Blast Off (disambiguation)
