= Mark J. Devlin =

American cosmologist

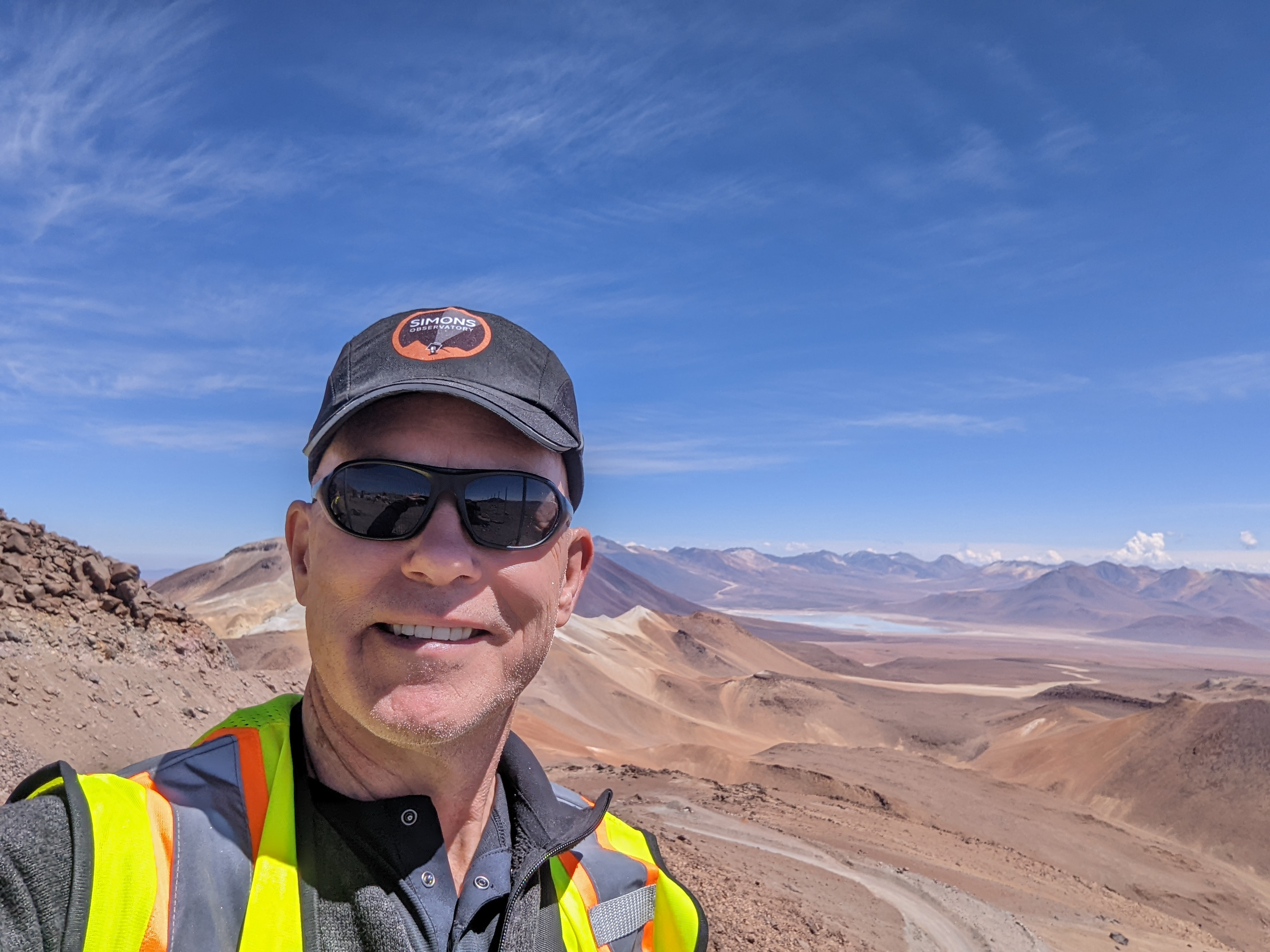
- Devlin on Cerro Toco in Northern Chile in 2023
- Born: New Brunswick, New Jersey, USA
- Known for: BLAST
- Relatives: Paul Devlin (brother)

Academic background
- Education: BA, 1988, University of Wisconsin–Madison; MSc, PhD, 1993, University of California, Berkeley
- Thesis: Measurements of anisotropy in the cosmic microwave background on degree angular scales (1994)
- Doctoral advisor: Andrew E. Lange

Mark Joseph Devlin is an American astrophysicist and cosmologist. He is the Reese W. Flower Professor of Astronomy and Astrophysics at the University of Pennsylvania.

== Early life and education ==
Devlin was born and raised in New Brunswick, New Jersey by parents Thomas Devlin and Nancy Sherry. His father was a particle physics professor at Rutgers University. He also grew up alongside his brother Paul, who later became an filmmaker.

Devlin completed his Bachelor of Science in physics and mathematics at the University of Wisconsin–Madison (UW–Madison) under the direction of Dan McCammon. In 2015, Devlin received the UW-Madison Physics Department Distinguished Alumni Award. Following his undergraduate degree, Devlin earned his Master of Science and PhD from the University of California, Berkeley under the direction of Andrew E. Lange.

== Career ==
Following his PhD, Devlin worked as a postdoctoral researcher at Princeton University from 1994 to 1995. He joined the University of Pennsylvania's Department of Physics and Astronomy in 1996 as an assistant professor. Upon joining the faculty, Devlin converted the balloon telescope he made at Princeton into a ground-based telescope for research in the high altitude plains of Chile. Following his promotion to associate professor in 2000, Devlin was also awarded a Sloan Research Fellowship from the Alfred P. Sloan Foundation. The purpose of the fellowship was to provide support and recognition to early-career scientists and scholars. During this time, he also served as a lead researcher in a multi-university project to develop and launch the Balloon-borne Large Aperture Submillimeter Telescope (BLAST). The telescope was created to allow researchers to observe star and galaxy wavelengths that were invisible to the naked eye. Despite numerous delays, BLAST launched its first test flight in September 2003 and flew for over 25 hours across New Mexico. In the same year, Devlin was appointed to a Class of 1965 Term Professorship in the School of Arts and Sciences.

In June 2006, Devlin oversaw the launch of BLAST from Sweden to Victoria Island in the Arctic Archipelago. During its four-day journey, BLAST collected images of 16 different objects in the Milky Way. Due to the remote nature of its landing, the research team required at least 10 helicopter trips to retrieve the balloon and equipment. When Devlin and his research team attempted a launch the following year from Antarctica, BLAST crashed into the ice during a failed landing. While a hard drive was salvaged by a rescue team, it could not be used, and 160GB of binary files were lost. Both of these launches were documented by Devlin's brother Paul, who then compiled his footage into a feature-length documentary called BLAST!. Devlin and his research team combined BLAST's survey measurements at wavelengths below 1 millimeter with data from the Spitzer Space Telescope to confirm that all cosmic infrared background comes from individual distant galaxies. In May 2007, Devlin was appointed the Reese W. Flower Professor of Astronomy and Astrophysics.

In 2016, Devlin began co-leading a project to establish a new astronomy facility in the Atacama Desert of Chile. Through the use of the Atacama Cosmology Telescope, Devlin's research team and colleagues at Princeton University were able to collect and release precise images of the universe at about 380,000 years old. In April 2025, Devlin was named a Member of the National Academy of Sciences for his work in experimental cosmology.
