= Blaster =

Blaster may refer to:

== Arts and entertainment ==
=== Fictional entities ===
- Raygun, or blaster, a science-fiction directed-energy weapon
  - Blaster (Star Wars)
- Blaster, G.I. Joe comic book character, a member of the G.I. Joe Team
- Blaster, animated TV series character, see list of GoBots characters
- Blaster, Autobot in The Transformers franchise. See List of The Transformers characters
- Blasters (comics), a DC Comics team of superhumans
- Blaster, a character in the 2009 film G-Force
- Blaster (video game character), from the Blaster Learning System videogame series

=== Music ===
- Blaster (Scott Weiland album), 2015
- "Blaster" (song), a 2003 song by Flow
- The Blasters, an American rock and roll band
  - The Blasters (album), 1982
- Blaster Silonga, Filipino singer-songwriter, musician and producer also known mononymously as Blaster

=== Other uses in arts and entertainment ===
- Blaster (video game), a 1983 arcade game
- "Blasters", an episode of Law & Order: Criminal Intent (season 6)

== Computing ==
- Blaster (computer worm), prevalent in 2003
- Blaster Learning System, an educational software series
- Sound Blaster, a family of sound cards by Creative Technology

== People ==
- Blaster Al Ackerman (William Hogg Greathouse Jr. 1939–2013), American mail artist and writer
- Blaster Bates (1923–2006), English explosives and demolition expert and comedian
- Hy Buller (1926–1968), nicknamed Blueline Blaster, Canadian ice hockey player

== Toys ==
- Gel blaster, a toy gun that shoots water beads
- Nerf Blaster, a toy gun that shoots foam projectiles
- Water blaster, a toy gun that shoots jets of water

== Other uses ==
- Blaster (flamethrower), a South African anti-carjacking device
- Aerodyne Blaster, a series of French single-place paragliders
- Kerala Blasters FC, an Indian professional football club commonly referred to as The Blasters
- PCB Blasters, a Pakistani women's cricket team

== See also ==
- Blast (disambiguation)
- Blaster Master (disambiguation)
- Blasters (disambiguation)
- Blasting (disambiguation)
- Ghettoblaster (disambiguation)
- Abrasive blasting
