= Aerodyne =

Aerodyne may refer to:

- Heavier-than-air aircraft, deriving lift from dynamic motion through the air
- Fender Aerodyne Telecaster, a contemporary model of the classic Fender Telecaster electric guitar
- Fender Aerodyne Jazz Bass, an electric bass guitar which typically has both "jazz" and "precision" style pickups
- Dornier Aerodyne, an unmanned VTOL aircraft
- Aerodyne Technologies, a former French parachute and paraglider manufacturer
