= Dream Out Loud (disambiguation) =

Dream Out Loud is a two-person Indian indie rock band.

Dream Out loud may also refer to:

- Dream Out Loud, a clothing line released by Selena Gomez
- Dream Out Loud, an EP by Troy Cassar-Daley released in 1994
- "Dream Out Loud", a 1988 single by Scarlett and Black
- "Dream Out Loud", a single released in 1994 from Beyond the Dancing by Troy Cassar-Daley
- "Dream Out Loud", a song on the 1999 album Seeing Things by Loaded Poets
- "Dream Out Loud", a track on Tonight's the Night (Romeo song), released in 2012

== See also ==
- Dreaming Out Loud (disambiguation)
