= Laser-blast =

Laser-blast or variation, may refer to:

- Laserblast, a 1978 U.S. science fiction film
- Laser Blast, a 1981 video game for the Atari 2600
- Buzz Lightyear Laser Blast (aka Laser Blast), an amusement park ride
- a laser-blast, the blast of a laser
  - the blast from a science fiction laser blaster gun
  - the blast from a real-life laser-based directed energy weapon
  - the ablative blast from the laser version of a sandblaster, in laser ablation

== See also ==
- Laser (disambiguation)
- Blast (disambiguation)
