= Telasi =

JSC Telasi formerly now as Telmico
- Native name: ს.ს. თელასი
- Company type: Private
- Industry: Energy
- Headquarters: Tbilisi, Georgia
- Area served: Tbilisi
- Services: Electricity distribution
- Revenue: ₾275.8 million (2014)
- Total assets: ₾264.8 million (2014)
- Total equity: ₾114.6 million (2014)
- Owner: Inter RAO UES (75%); JSC Partnership Fund (24.53%)
- Number of employees: 2100+
- Parent: Inter RAO UES
- Website: telasi.ge

Telasi is an electricity distribution company of Tbilisi, Georgia. In 1998, the company was privatized to AES Corporation, whose efforts to repair and modernize the electrical grid of Tbilisi were documented in the film Power Trip by Paul Devlin. In 2003, AES sold Telasi to a Russian company Inter RAO UES. The Russian company paid $26 million to AES for Telasi and in return AES paid off $60 million of Telasi debt, in effect paying Inter RAO UES $34 million to take Telasi off their hands. The sale took place less than a year after AES-Telasi CFO Niko Lominadze was found murdered in his apartment and numerous other threats were made to AES-Telasi management. In the end, AES lost more than $300 million on the Telasi episode.

== See also ==
- Energy in Georgia (country)
