= The Front Man =

2014 American documentary film directed by Paul Devlin

- Produced by: Paul Devlin
- Starring: Jim Wood
- Release date: 2014
- Running time: 73 minutes
- Country: United States
- Language: English

The Front Man is a 2014 American documentary film directed by Paul Devlin. The film follows New Jersey musician Jim Wood, lead singer of the rock band Loaded Poets, over a period of nearly three decades as he pursues a career in music while confronting questions about fame, success, family life, and personal fulfillment.

The documentary combines archival footage, home videos, interviews, and contemporary observations to chronicle Wood's long-running ambition to achieve commercial success as a musician. While centered on the experiences of Wood and his band, the film also explores broader themes related to celebrity culture, artistic ambition, and the meaning of success.

== Synopsis ==
The film chronicles the life of Jim Wood, frontman of the New Jersey rock band Loaded Poets. Despite decades of performing, recording music, and pursuing opportunities within the music industry, Wood remains determined to achieve wider recognition and commercial success.

Over the course of the documentary, Wood's aspirations are contrasted with the realities of adulthood, including his marriage to Christie Wood and the couple's discussions about starting a family. As the narrative progresses, the film shifts from a portrait of an aspiring rock musician to an examination of changing priorities, personal growth, and the relationship between ambition and happiness.

== Production ==
The film was directed, produced, and edited by Paul Devlin, a documentary filmmaker and television producer. Devlin followed Wood and the members of Loaded Poets over a period spanning approximately 27 years, incorporating archival material alongside newly filmed footage.

According to Devlin, the project evolved beyond a conventional music documentary into a character-driven story that examines both romantic relationships and the pursuit of artistic goals. The filmmaker described the work as exploring society's fascination with fame and the value of creative achievement outside mainstream recognition.

== Release ==
The Front Man premiered in 2014 and was screened at several film festivals in the United States, including the Cinequest Film Festival and the Florida Film Festival. The film later received additional festival screenings and theatrical engagements, including screenings at the IFC Center in New York City.

== Reception ==
The film received generally positive reviews from critics, who praised its long-term observational approach and its examination of ambition and personal fulfillment.

Reviewers noted the documentary's unusual blend of music documentary, character study, and relationship story. Critics highlighted the film's depiction of Wood's pursuit of fame and the way in which the narrative evolves into a broader reflection on adulthood and changing priorities.

Writing about the film following its screening at the Florida Film Festival, reviewers described it as a portrait of a musician whose aspirations remain largely unchanged despite decades of limited commercial success. Other commentators praised the film's exploration of celebrity culture and its focus on the tension between artistic dreams and everyday life.
