= Flaugher =

Flaugher is a surname. Notable people with this name include:

- Brenna Flaugher, American cosmologist
- John Flaugher, original name of Michael Reagan, American political commentator and adopted son of president Ronald Reagan
- Jonny Flaugher, American musician, supporting member of pop-folk duo The Weepies
