= Vladimir Komarov (musician) =

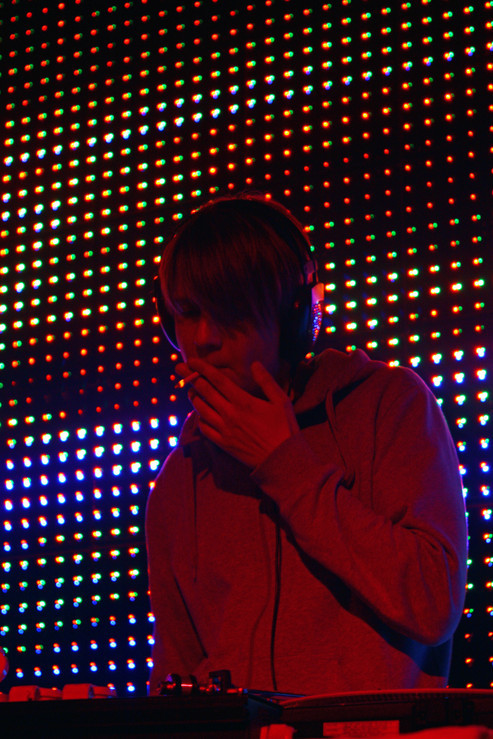
- Vladimir Komarov in 2012

Background information
- Born: Vladimir Andreyevich Komarov; 14 September 1976 (age 49); Novosibirsk, Soviet Union
- Genres: Shoegazing, indie pop, indie rock
- Occupation(s): Musician, singer, songwriter, sound producer
- Instrument(s): Vocals, guitar, bass, keyboards, piano, drums, melodica
- Years active: 1991–present
- Labels: Various

Vladimir Andreyevich Komarov (Russian: Владимир Андpeeвич Комаров; born 14 September 1976, Novosibirsk) is a Russian musician, singer, songwriter, sound producer, DJ, and journalist. He is the founder of Hot Zex and the frontman of Punk TV.

== Biography ==
Komarov became interested in modern pop music when his mother brought a tape recorder and some Beatles cassettes when he was six years old. In 1989, Vladimir left music school after completing eight years as a major in piano and three years in a Jazz and Pop faculty. On 1 September 1991, he started an art-punk band named Shoe Repair (Remont Obuvi) with his school, which morphed into a more serious project, Hot Zex, in the next couple of months.

After graduating from World Culture Studies at the Novosibirsk State Pedagogic University History Department, Komarov enrolled as a social philosophy postgraduate at the Novosibirsk State Architectural University Philosophy Department. He left in 2001 with a thesis on the Nature and Typology of Nationalism and continued as a journalist. In 2002, he completed a Management Training Program at Manchester University Business School.

In the summer of 2006, Vladimir's project, Punk TV, signed with Moscow production company Soundhunters, and moved to Moscow to become a professional musician. Hot Zex and Punk TV earned international acclaim in the Russian indie rock and indietronica scene.

== Music ==
=== Hot Zex ===
Hot Zex is a Russian rock group formed in Novosibirsk in 1991. The line-up changed several times with Komarov as the only constant member. Komarov started out as the band's drummer, but after a few failed attempts at recruiting a singer, he took on vocal duties in January 1995. The exact date of the band's founding is unknown. Between September 1 and December 26, 1991, they used a primitive tape recorder to track their first demo which consisted of four instrumental songs. The band continued to play rare gigs in Moscow and Saint-Petersburg (with Alexander Bogdan on bass), the most recent of which dates back to 2010. Hot Zex never officially broke up. Komarov and Nikonov are rumored to have put the project on hiatus, with a collection of rare and unissued recordings in the pipeline.

==== Punk TV ====
Punk TV is a Russian electro-rock band, formed in Novosibirsk in 2004.

=== Miscellaneous projects ===
- In Autumn 2007, Vladimir recorded vocals on "Bely List" for Bi-2 side project Nechetny Voin 2. In 2008, he played live with Bi-2 at Nashestvie festival and a series of TV shows. The Bi-2 gig at Moscow Modern Play Theatre, 3 March 2008, was released on DVD in 2011.
- In 2008, Vladimir collaborated with Oleg Kostrov on his Supersonic Future album "The best of the worst". He recorded the bulk of the guitar tracks throughout the album and sang on "Dead Boys".
- In 2008, Vladimir recorded synth parts for "Anyday Anytime" by Moscow indie band Lost Weekend. The song was included on Lost Weekend's "Lights and Fears" album released by Fusion/Gala in 2010.
- In April 2012, the cinema release of Yusup Bakshiev's "Rendezvous", with most of the original soundtrack written by Vladimir. He also made a small on-screen appearance as the soundman for a school girl-group The Poisoned Peaches.
- Vladimir took part in the recording of Novosibirsk band FPRF's album, due for release on Hopneck Sound.
- In Spring 2012, Vladimir founded WOW!, an electro-garage duo with Dmitry Wild in New York. In September 2012, they released an online single "Have Fun" and continue work on their debut EP at Stratosphere Sound, NY.
- July 2013, Vladimir and Moscow's Revoltmeter joined forces in a trans-Atlantic collaboration and released "Death Electric" EP. 4 tracks release was met with warm reviews. A Russia Magazine named title song as a "track of the week" while LA-based website FFM used words "A fresh breath of Manhattan air..." to describe the atmosphere of the song.
- Vladimir frequently plays DJ sets. In 2007-2011 he was resident DJ at Moscow club Krizis Zhanra.

== Sound production ==
Komarov's debut as other artists' sound producer took place at Riga's Sound Division Studio in Autumn 2006 when he produced 4 songs by Moscow indie band Dairy High. "Evil Lullaby" was released in 2007 as a 7" vinyl split single with "Honeypod In My Head" by New Zealand band The Cakekithchen. A year later, "Evil Lullaby" and the other three tracks from the same record session ("The Crooked Mile (Without a Song)", "Flickering Light", "Most Expensive Crash") were released on Dairy High's eponymous album. The remaining 6 album tracks were done by legendary Welsh producer Greg Haver. Apart from sound production, Komarov also played grand piano, melodica, provided backing vocals and arranged the acoustic ballad "Running Aground".

In late 2007, Komarov started recording and mixing the Moscow post-punk band Manicure's debut album. The record, released in spring 2009 by Fusion/Gala, was a major hit in Russia and was noted abroad. Rolling Stone Russia called the album "a full-fledged contender for Best National Debut of the Year", Afisha dubbed it "perfect English-language post-punk". "Another Girl" was used in an ad by a famous alcohol brand and featured in the original film soundtrack to Antikiller D.K. Apart from sound production, Komarov also programmed rhythm machines and bass synthesizers on "I Wanna Be Free" and "The One", played guitar on "Magic is Shit".

Komarov has remixed tracks by Ian Brown, Ash, SPC ECO, Asbo Kid, Craig Walker, Kontakte, Electric Mainline, The Nova Saints, Bondage Fairies, Brittle Stars, Bi-2, Mars Needs Lovers feat. Ilya Lagutenko, Illuminated Faces, Aerofall, A Headphones, Blast.

== Journalism ==
Komarov worked as a journalist from autumn 2001 to summer 2005 at Kontinent Sibir, a Serbian business weekly. In September–December 2002 he was an intern at Financial Times, London. Since 2011, he has contributed to Russian editions of Rolling Stone and GQ, Soundengineer, Stereo&Video, and the Look At Me website.
