= Blasting =

Blasting may refer to:

- Abrasive blasting
- Blast furnace
- Rock blasting

== See also ==
- Blast (disambiguation)
- Blaster (disambiguation)
