= Marc Smith (poet) =

American poet (born 1949)

Marc Kelly Smith
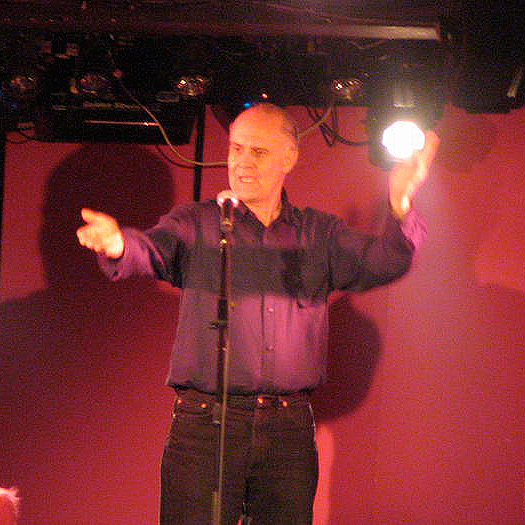
- Smith in 2012
- Born: 1949 (age 76–77); Chicago, Illinois, U.S.
- Occupation: Poet

Marc Kelly Smith (born 1949) is an American poet and founder of the poetry slam movement, for which he received the nickname Slam Papi.

Smith was born in 1949 and grew up on the southeast side of Chicago. He attended/graduated Charles P. Caldwell Elementary School and James H. Bowen High School. Smith spent most of his young life as a construction worker, but has written poetry since he was 19.

== Uptown Poetry Slam ==
Smith started at an open mic night at the Get Me High lounge in November 1984 called the Monday Night Poetry Reading. Even as poets scoffed at artists "performing" their work, rather than gently "reading" it, the event grew in popularity. Smith saw his approach as an "up yours" to establishment poets he considered snooty and effete, because at their events, "no one was listening".

According to Smith, who once attended a conventional reading with his manuscripts concealed inside a newspaper,

The very word 'poetry' repels people. Why is that? Because of what schools have done to it. The slam gives it back to the people.... We need people to talk poetry to each other. That's how we communicate our values, our hearts, the things that we've learned that make us who we are.

With a like-minded troupe, Smith hosted the first poetry slam at the Get Me High Lounge in the Bucktown neighborhood in 1986. The event soon migrated to the Green Mill, a tavern and jazz lounge in Chicago's Uptown neighborhood, where it has remained ever since. Other poets in the first slam were Mike Barrett, Rob Van Tuyle, Jean Howard, Anna Brown, Karen Nystrom, Dave Cooper, and John Sheehan, all fellow members of the Chicago Poetry Ensemble. According to Smith, the first slam was more variety show than competition. Though all slams vary in format, Smith is considered responsible for key features, including the selection of judges from the audience and cash prizes.

As stated in the PBS television series, The United States of Poetry, a "strand of new poetry began at Chicago's Green Mill Tavern in 1987 when Marc Smith found a home for the Poetry Slam." Smith had found a crowd-inclusive, entertaining method for nurturing the poetry scene. Since then, the poetry slam has spread throughout the world, exported to over 500 cities large and small.

In the book, Words in Your Face: A Guided Tour Through Twenty Years of the New York City Poetry Slam, author Cristin O'Keefe Aptowicz describes the influential Smith:

Extremely well-read and a disciplined, passionate writer, Smith did not think of poetry as something lofty, a refined ideal that people should strive to achieve. Rather, he believed that poetry should reflect the core of one's being, that it was a raw part of humanity, and that a poet had to be both fearless and dogged to tackle it properly. His dedication to this belief was so evident that when Smithsonian magazine covered the poetry slam phenomenon in their September 1992 issue, the reporter described Smith as "almost visionary on the need to rescue poetry from its lowly status in the nation’s cultural life."

Since July 1986, Smith has run the Uptown Poetry Slam, a three-hour show featuring an open mic (1 hour), feature—poet or professional touring act (1 hour), and the poetry slam. It is the longest-running, weekly poetry show in the country, and one of the longest-running shows in Chicago history.

In 1990, the first National Poetry Slam was held in San Francisco (with three city teams attending including Chicago and New York City), and has continued to rotate among cities. The National Poetry Slam currently sees over 80 teams of poets vying for the title.

Over the years, Smith has turned down offers to commercialize the slam, including movie offers and bids for corporate sponsorship. Smith says that what he considers to be Slam's increased commercial exploitation, and Def Poetry Jam in particular, as having "diminished the value and aesthetic of performance poetry." This, combined with a continuing lack of Slam's recognition by "big literature festivals and institutions" in America, has led Smith to become more invested in performance poetry in Europe, where he says the "audiences are growing over there. And the aesthetic is growing and evolving."

Smith has published several books about the poetry slam movement, as well as publishing two books of his own work. He tours extensively, performing his own, blue-collar, Carl Sandburg-influenced poetry and hosting poetry slams. He also tours with a show titled Sandburg to Smith-Smith to Sandburg, which combines the work of both poets with live jazz. With Mark Eleveld, he has developed a podcast, "Thru the Mill with Marc Kelly Smith".

In July of 2026, the 40th anniversary of the Uptown Poetry Slam was celebrated with an event at the Newberry Library in Chicago, at which the library also celebrated its acquisition of Smith's archive, the Marc Kelly Smith Poetry Slam Collection. In addition to photos, programs, newsletters, administrative files and promotional material, the collection includes "a pair of boxing gloves given to Smith by the late poet and artist Tony Fitzpatrick" at the celebration of the Slam's 25th anniversary. It may take up to three years to process the entire collection but the library anticipates that some material will be available for viewing later in 2026.

== Bibliography ==
- By Someone's Good Grace, CD 1993, Publisher Splinter Group Chicago
- Crowdpleaser, 1996, Publisher Jeff Helgeson
- The Spoken Word Revolution, 2003, Publisher Sourcebooks Publishing, advisor to the book/narrator of CD portion
- The Complete Idiot's Guide to Slam Poetry, 2004, Penguin/Alpha Press (co-written with Joe Kraynak)
- The Spoken Word Revolution Redux, 2006, Publisher Sourcebooks Publishing, narrator of CD portion
- Quarters in the Jukebox, CD, 2006, Publisher EM Press (www.em-press.com), live and studio tracks, with bands and solo
- Ground Zero. Northwestern University Press. 2020. ISBN 978-0-8101-4308-1.

== Filmography ==
- SlamNation - 1998, directed by Paul Devlin
- Sunday Night Poets - 2002, directed by David Rorie, Pugi Films distributed by National Film Network

https://www.directedbydavid.com/portraits

- Histoire de dires - 2008, documentary directed by Yann Francès & Matthieu Chevallier - produced by Vivement lundi !
