= Dreaming Out Loud (disambiguation) =

Dreaming Out Loud is a 2007 album by OneRepublic.

Dreaming Out Loud may also refer to:

- Somniloquy, the act of talking in one's sleep
- Dreaming Out Loud (film), a 1940 film directed by Harold Young
- Dreamin' Out Loud, a 1996 album by Trace Adkins
- Dreaming Out Loud, a 2006 album by The Radiators

== See also ==
- Dream Out Loud (disambiguation)
