= Ghettoblaster (disambiguation) =

A ghettoblaster or boombox is a portable audio player.

Ghettoblaster(s) or Ghetto Blaster(s) may also refer to:

== Music ==
=== Albums ===
- Ghettoblaster (Armand Van Helden album), 2007
- Ghetto Blaster (The Crusaders album), 1984
- Ghetto Blaster (Push Button Objects album), 2003
- Ghetto Blaster (Red Aunts album), 1998
- The Ghetto Blaster EP, an EP by Street Sweeper Social Club, 2010
- Ghettoblaster, by Socalled, 2007
- Ghetto Blasters, by Mahala Rai Banda, 2009

=== Songs ===
- "Ghetto Blaster", by Bobby Burns and Afrojack, 2009-2010
- "Ghettoblaster", by Michael Fall from Turn On Your Radio, 2013
- "Ghetto Blaster", by Teenage Fanclub from Deep Fried Fanclub
- "Step Up, Ghettoblaster", by Mindless Self Indulgence

=== Other ===
- Ghetto Blaster, a fictitious band on the 2000 compilation album Suitcase: Failed Experiments and Trashed Aircraft by Guided by Voices
- "Ghetto Blaster", a video introduction to Justin Timberlake's part of the 2003 Justified & Stripped Tour
- Ghetto Blaster Recordings, a record label run by Topon Das of the band Fuck the Facts

== Other ==
- Ghetto Blaster (video game), a 1985 computer game
- The Ghetto Blasters or Harlem Heat, a professional wrestling tag team
- Ghetto Blaster, a James Bond gadget from the film The Living Daylights
