= Freestyle: The Art of Rhyme =

- U.S. release poster
- Directed by: Kevin Fitzgerald
- Produced by: Henry Alex Rubin
- Cinematography: Todd Hickey
- Edited by: Paul Devlin
- Distributed by: Palm Pictures
- Release date: April 14, 2000 (US)
- Running time: 60 minutes
- Country: United States
- Language: English
- Box office: $12,600

Freestyle: The Art of Rhyme is a 2000 American documentary film directed by Kevin Fitzgerald, with Paul Devlin serving as producing editor. The film depicts the art of freestyle rap.

== Plot ==
The history of freestyle rap is explored in the film, with a mix of performance and commentary from a number of artists. Using archive footage, the film traces the origins of improvised hip hop to sources including African-American preachers, Jamaican toasts, improvised jazz, and spoken-word poets.

== Cast ==
- Mos Def
- Black Thought
- Bahamadia
- Freestyle Fellowship
- Questlove
- Supernatural
- Craig G
- Pharoahe Monch
- Medusa
- Abstract Rude
- Akim Funk Buddha
- Planet Asia
- Otherwize
- Juice
- Wordsworth
- Lord Finesse
- Living Legends
- Jurassic 5
- Boots Riley
- Darkleaf
- Divine Styler
- The Last Poets
- Emanuel Cartagena

== Reception ==
=== Critical reception ===
On review aggregator website Rotten Tomatoes, the film holds an approval rating of 89% based on 18 reviews, and an average rating of 7.8/10. On Metacritic, the film has a weighted average score of 63 out of 100, based on 11 critics, indicating "generally favorable" reviews.

A. O. Scott of The New York Times commented that "The skills on display in Freestyle are too varied and idiosyncratic for one movie to contain, but this one at least offers a heady, rousing education in an art form that is too often misunderstood." Nathan Rabin of The A.V. Club wrote, "With a running time just over an hour, Freestyle doesn't have the time or space to offer an exhaustive or definitive history of freestyling, but it exuberantly captures its spirit, and like any good rapper, it's savvy enough to leave audiences hungry for more." Fred Camper of Chicago Reader called it "[a]n engaged and knowing look at the underground world of improvised rap, concentrating on artists less interested in commercial success and cutting records than in the 'spontaneous right now' of 'nonconceptual rhyme.'"

In 2012, Complex placed the film at number 17 on the "25 Best Hip-Hop Documentaries" list.

=== Accolades ===
Award	Year	Category	Recipient(s)	Result	Ref(s)
Woodstock Film Festival	2000	Best Documentary	Freestyle: The Art of Rhyme	Won	
Kara Film Festival	2006	Special Mention for Best Documentary	Freestyle: The Art of Rhyme	Won	
