= Blast Off =

Blast Off may refer to:

== Music ==
=== Albums ===
- Blast Off! (Stray Cats album), a 1989 album by Stray Cats
- Blast Off! (The Blue Hearts album), a 1991 album by The Blue Hearts
- Blast Off, a 1959 album by Ferrante & Teicher
- Blast Off!, a 1970 album by Louis Prima

=== Songs ===
- "Blast Off" (song), a 2014 song by David Guetta and Kaz James
- "Blastoff" (Internet Money song) (2020)
- "Blast Off", a 1958 single by The Tyrones
- "Blast Off", a 1979 single by The Shapes
- "Blast Off!", a song by The Birthday Party from the 1982 album Junkyard
- "Blastoffff", a song by Joywave (2018)
- "Blast Off!", a song by Rivers Cuomo from his album Alone: The Home Recordings of Rivers Cuomo
- "Blast Off", a song by Silk Sonic from their 2021 album An Evening with Silk Sonic

== Other uses ==
- Blast Off (video game), a 1989 arcade game by Namco
- Blast-Off (G.I. Joe), a fictional character in the G.I. Joe universe
- Blast Off (Transformers), a Transformers character
- Blast Off, a comic book by Mike Richardson
- Blast Off!, 1997 film directed by Dave Markey

== See also ==
- "Blast off", an expression used during a countdown to a rocket launch
- Blasting Off, a 1991 album by Red Lorry Yellow Lorry
- Blast (disambiguation)
