= Punk TV =

Russian electronic rock band

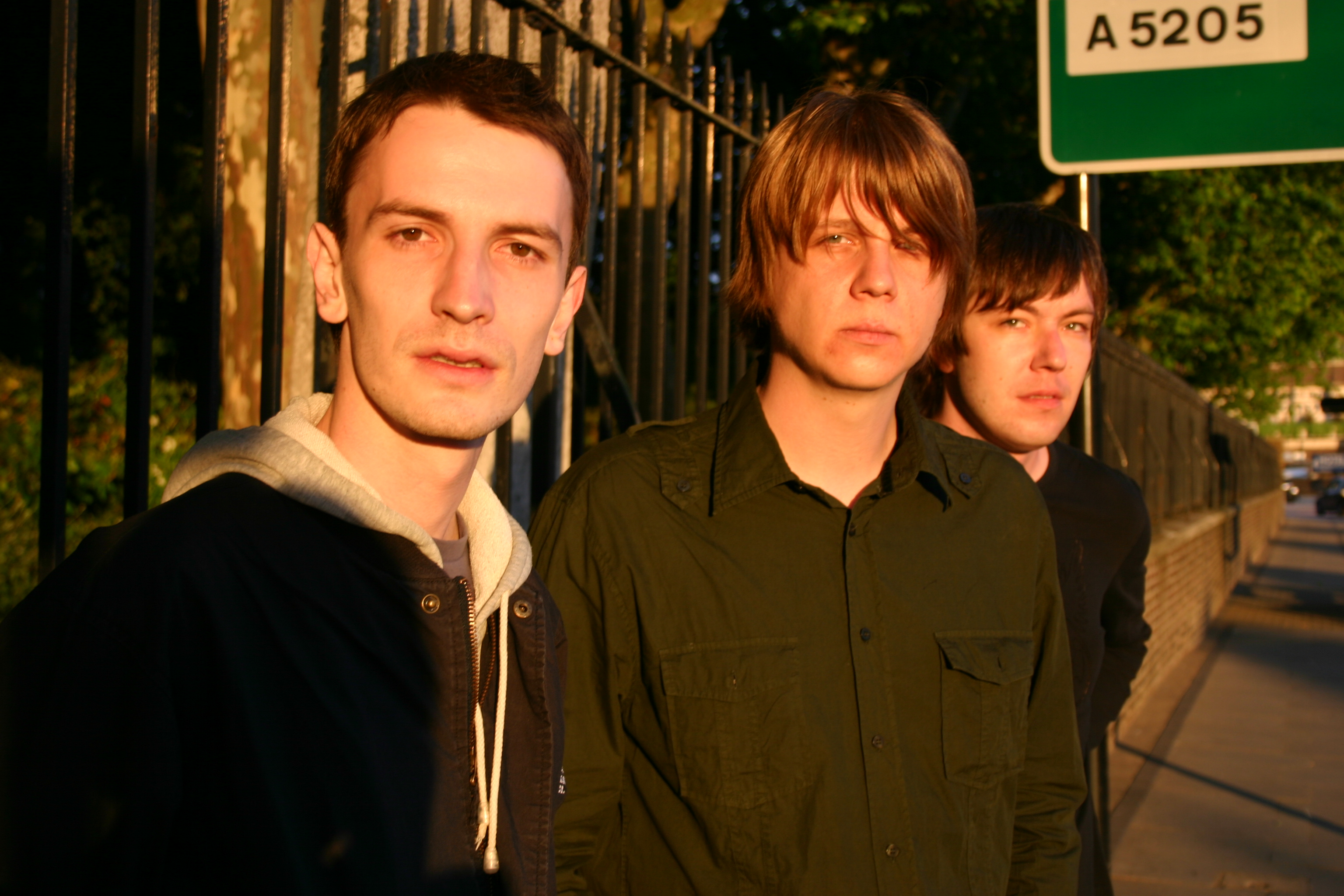
- "Punk TV" in London, 2007

Background information
- Origin: Russia
- Genres: Electronic rock
- Years active: 2003–present
- Members: Vladimir Komarov; Alex Kelman; Konstantin Nikonov

Punk TV is an electronic rock band from Novosibirsk, Russia. It was founded in 2003.

== History ==
The group was formed in Novosibirsk in 2003.

== Reviews ==
The band's debut album "Punk TV" received positive reviews from music critics:

Excellent album from a trio of Siberians who mix driving, droning guitars with thick buzzing electronics. It has a touch of New Order and Ratatat to it, a bit of breakbeat and a dark Flaming Lips-like beauty that seems to be found only in places not on the musical map. Cool.

Alex Kelman, Volodya Komarov and Kostya Nikonov are the Siberian trio behind Punk TV, carving out a niche for themselves with a set that is sure to extend their appeal well beyond native Russia. Opening with the atmospheric, propulsive «Day by Day», this disc would be perfect accompaniment for a spy movie, with its trick-start beginnings («Amsterdam»), tick tock rhythms coupled with floaty drones («Zoomer Goodnight») and plenty of disco guitars for those spies' nights off. They’ll probably even get the girl at the end. Romantic avant-garde indie new-wave poptronica? Yes, please.

An electronics whiz, a bassist, and a drummer, all from Siberia, open up their debut album with a cute, curvy indie-pop tune about being on tour — but quickly they unveil a surprising array of dance beats, expert pacing, killer sonic kicks, and rich atmospherics. Invoking vintage European film soundtracks, American rock classics, and 90s U.K. pop, the album is exhilaratingly integrated, avoiding the usual gauche misalliances of rock, disco, and techno.

== Albums ==
- 2005 – Punk TV
- 2007 – Music for the broken keys
- 2009 – Loverdrive
- 2011 – Space Shadows
- 2012 – Loverdub (remix version of "Loverdrive" album)

=== Singles and EP ===
- 2006 – Snowboy Remixes
- 2008 – Sunderground EP
- 2009 – Every minute is OK EP
- 2010 – S.S.
- 2010 – Solar EP
- 2011 – Phantom Remixes
