= Thomas J. Devlin =

American experimental high-energy physicist (1935–2022)

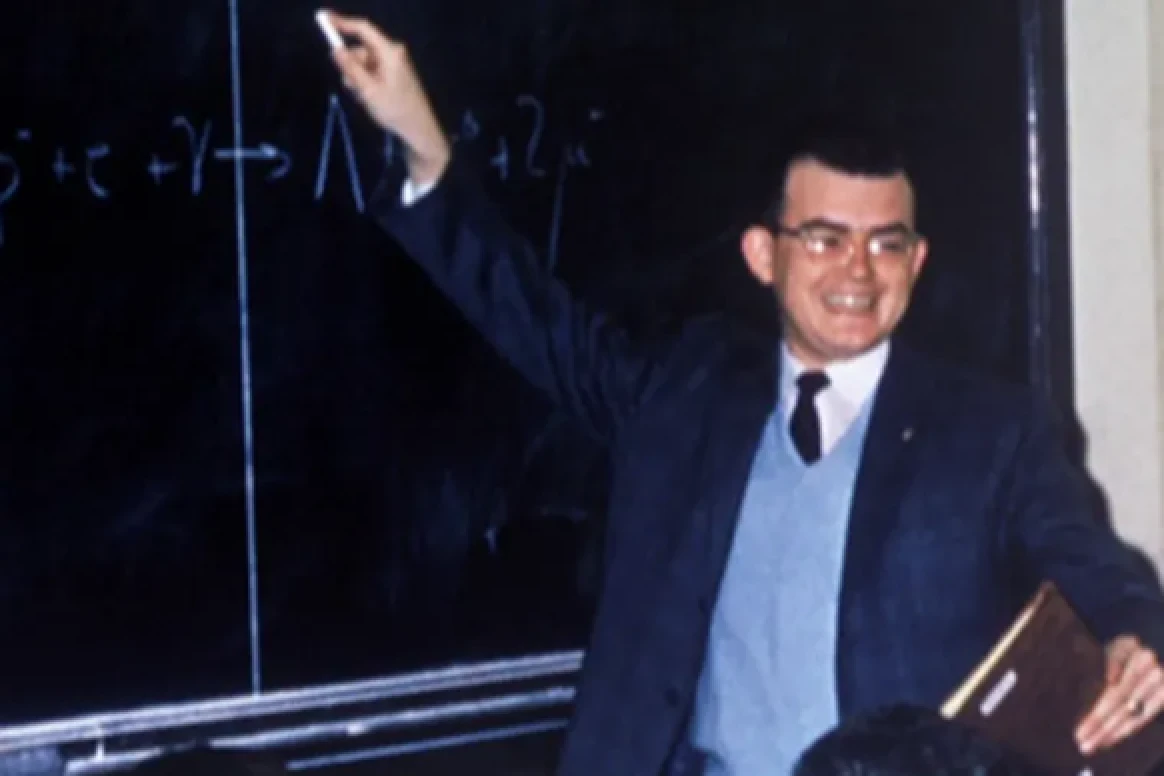
- Born: August 23, 1935
- Died: October 2, 2022 (aged 87)
- Awards: Panofsky Prize (1994)
- Scientific career
- Fields: Experimental high-energy physics
- Institutions: Rutgers University, University of Pennsylvania

Thomas J. Devlin (August 23, 1935 – October 2, 2022) was an American experimental high-energy physicist. He was a Fellow of the American Physical Society.

== Early life and education ==
Devlin attended school in Jenkintown and Philadelphia. He studied physics at La Salle College, receiving his bachelor's degree in 1957. He later attended the University of California, Berkeley, where he earned a master's degree in 1959 and a Ph.D. in 1961 under Burton J. Moyer.

== Career ==
From 1962 to 1967, Devlin worked at Princeton University. He later became a professor at Rutgers University, where he remained until his retirement in 2007. After retiring, he joined the University of Pennsylvania.

He was a visiting scientist at CERN from 1970 to 1971 and at Fermilab during 1980–1981 and 1988–1990. Throughout his career, he conducted experiments at the Bevatron 184-inch cyclotron in Berkeley, the AGS at Brookhaven National Laboratory, the Princeton–Pennsylvania Accelerator, Fermilab, and CERN.

In 2005, Devlin shifted his research focus to astrophysics and worked at the Robert C. Byrd Green Bank Telescope (GBT), studying the polarization of radio emissions from galaxies.

In addition to his research, Devlin was widely recognized for his commitment to teaching and mentoring. In 2017, he received the American Physical Society Division of Particles and Fields Mentoring Award for his dedication to mentoring students and postdoctoral researchers and for fostering an inclusive environment for young scientists. The award citation also recognized his early and unwavering support for gender diversity in physics.

== Research and awards ==
For his experiments on the polarization and magnetic moment of hyperons conducted at Fermilab between 1974 and 1985, Devlin received the Panofsky Prize in 1994. He later worked on the CDF detector at Fermilab.

Devlin was elected a Fellow of the American Physical Society in 1985 for "the discovery that hyperons produced by high energy protons are strongly polarized, and the subsequent use of polarized hyperon beams to make precise measurements of hyperon magnetic moments." He became a Guggenheim Fellow in 1991.

== Personal life ==
Devlin was married to psychologist Nancy Devlin and had three sons, including producer Paul Devlin. His son Mark J. Devlin became a professor of astrophysics and astronomy at the University of Pennsylvania.

Devlin died on October 2, 2022, at the age of 87.
