= SlamNation =

- DVD cover
- Directed by: Paul Devlin
- Produced by: Tom Poole: Co-Producer, Michael Shaw: Co-Producer
- Starring: Saul Williams, Jessica Care Moore, Beau Sia
- Edited by: Paul Devlin
- Music by: Chris Parker
- Release date: 1998
- Country: United States
- Language: English

SlamNation is a 1998 documentary film by director Paul Devlin. The film follows the National Poetry Slam in Portland, Oregon.

It follows the 1996 Nuyorican Poetry Slam team (Saul Williams, Beau Sia, muMs da Schemer and Jessica Care Moore) as they competed at the 1996 National Poetry Slam held in Portland, OR. The film also features performances by Marc Smith, Patricia Smith, Taylor Mali, Alexandra Oliver and Bob Holman, among many others.

The film is one of the first films to document the art and competition of the poetry slam: a spoken word competition where judges, randomly chosen from the audience, score poets on a scale from one to ten and the poet with the highest score at the end of the evening wins.

SlamNation premiered at the 1998 SXSW Film Festival and was awarded Best Documentary at the 1998 Northampton Independent Film Festival. SlamNation was broadcast on Cinemax/HBO and Starz/Encore, 2000–2002.

Though it would only enjoy a limited theatrical run, the film was nonetheless critically well received. Roger Ebert wrote a glowing review, calling the poetry slam "a pop culture phenomenon". In her book Words In Your Face: A Guided Tour Through Twenty Years of the New York City Poetry Slam, author Cristin O'Keefe Aptowicz calls the film "slam's second bible" (behind the Nuyorican anthology Aloud) and writes,

[SlamNation] showcased the best poetry and performances from the best poets across the country, and all within the anxiety-provoking context of the National Poetry Slam. One viewing of the movie could inspire a dozen new poems, and the seamless perfection of the group pieces found in the movie would forever change the number of and quality of the group work presented at the Nationals. It was also the perfect poetry slam propaganda for starting and encouraging new poetry slam venues.
