= John M. Wilcox =

American geophysicist (1925–1983)

- Born: 1925
- Died: October 14, 1983 (aged 58); Puerto Peñasco, Sonora, Mexico
- Education: University of California, Berkeley; Iowa State College
- Known for: Wilcox Solar Observatory
- Scientific career
- Fields: Geophysics
- Workplaces: University of California, Berkeley
- Doctoral students: Andrew S. Tanenbaum

John Marsh Wilcox (1925 – October 14, 1983) was an American geophysicist. He worked at the University of California, Berkeley at the Space Sciences Laboratory from 1964 to 1971. He was an adjunct professor at Stanford University from 1971 until his death.

Wilcox received his Ph.D. at the University of California at Berkeley in 1954 under the supervision of Burton J. Moyer. The title of his dissertation was "A direct measurement of the nuclear internal momentum distributions of protons in light nuclei."

He died while swimming off the beach of Puerto Peñasco.
