= Freestyle rap =

Form of rap that relies on improvising

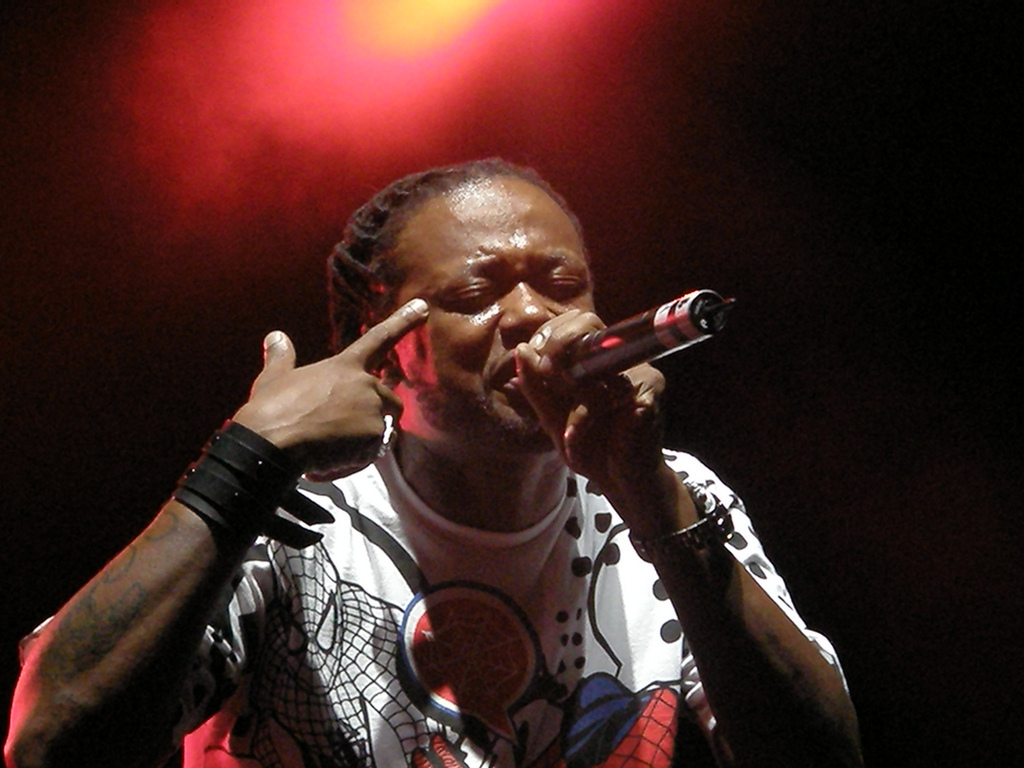
MC Supernatural is one of the innovators of freestyle.

Freestyle rap, also simply known as freestyle, is a style of hip-hop music where an artist normally improvises an unwritten verse, with or without instrumental beats, in which lyrics are recited with no particular subject or structure. It is similar to other improvisational music, such as jazz, where a lead instrumentalist acts as an improviser with a supporting band providing a beat. Freestyle originally was simply verse that is free of style, written rhymes that do not follow a specific subject matter, or predetermined cadence. The newer style with the improvisation grew popular starting in the early 1990s. It is now mainly associated with hip hop.

== Original definition ==
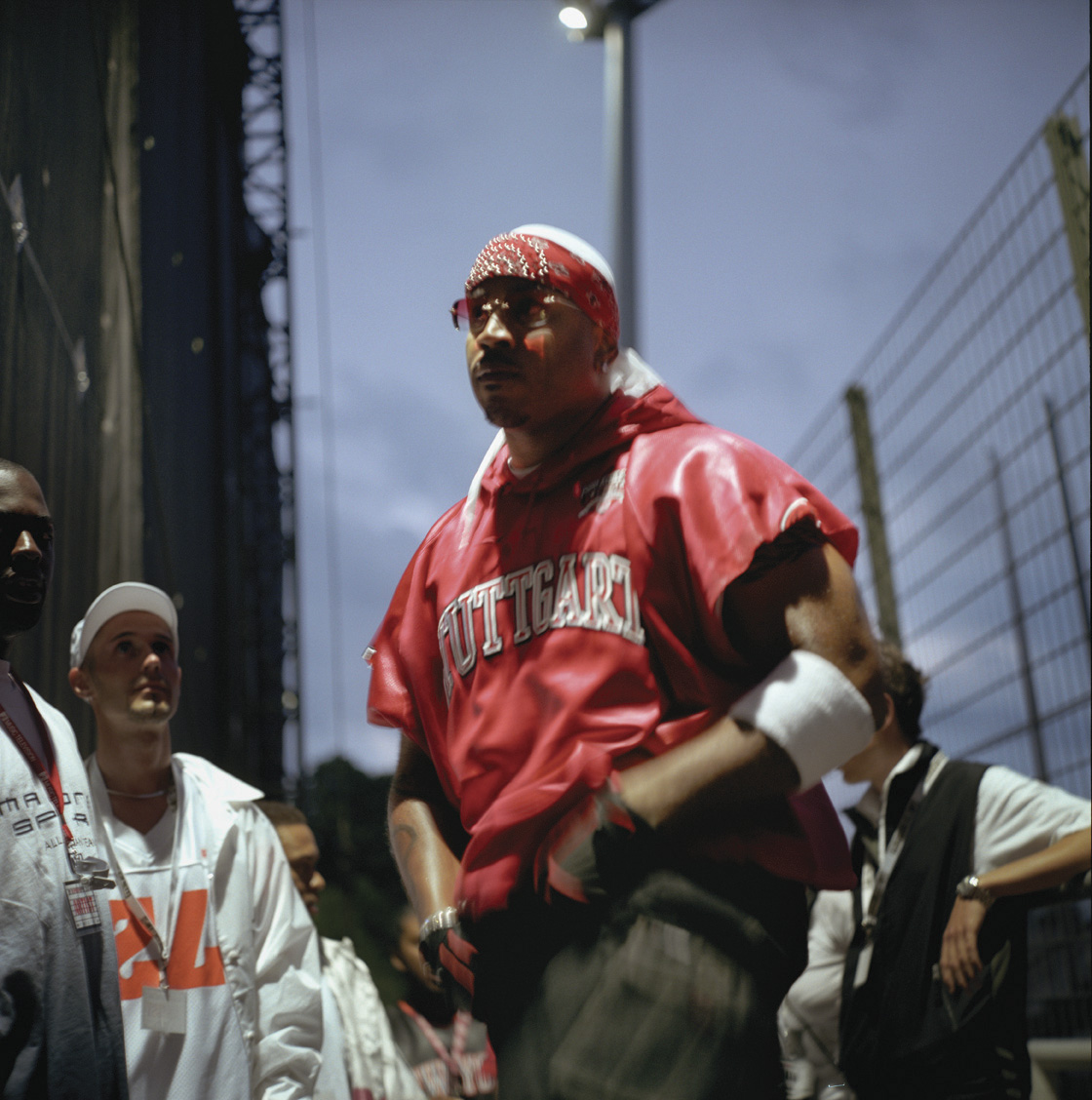
LL Cool J freestyled over DJ tracks.

In the book How to Rap (2009), Big Daddy Kane and Myka 9 note that originally a freestyle was a spit on no particular subject – Big Daddy Kane said: "[I]n the '80s, when we said we wrote a freestyle rap, that meant that it was a rhyme that you wrote that was free of style... it's basically a rhyme just bragging about yourself." Myka 9 adds: "back in the day, freestyle was bust[ing] a rhyme about any random thing, and it was a written rhyme or something memorized." Divine Styler says: "in the school I come from, freestyling was a non-conceptual written rhyme... and now they call freestyling off the top of the head, so the era I come from, it's a lot different". Kool Moe Dee also refers to this earlier definition in his 2003 book, There's a God on the Mic:

There are two types of freestyle. There's an old-school freestyle that's basically rhymes that you've written that may not have anything to do with any subject or that goes all over the place. Then there's freestyle where you come off the top of the head.

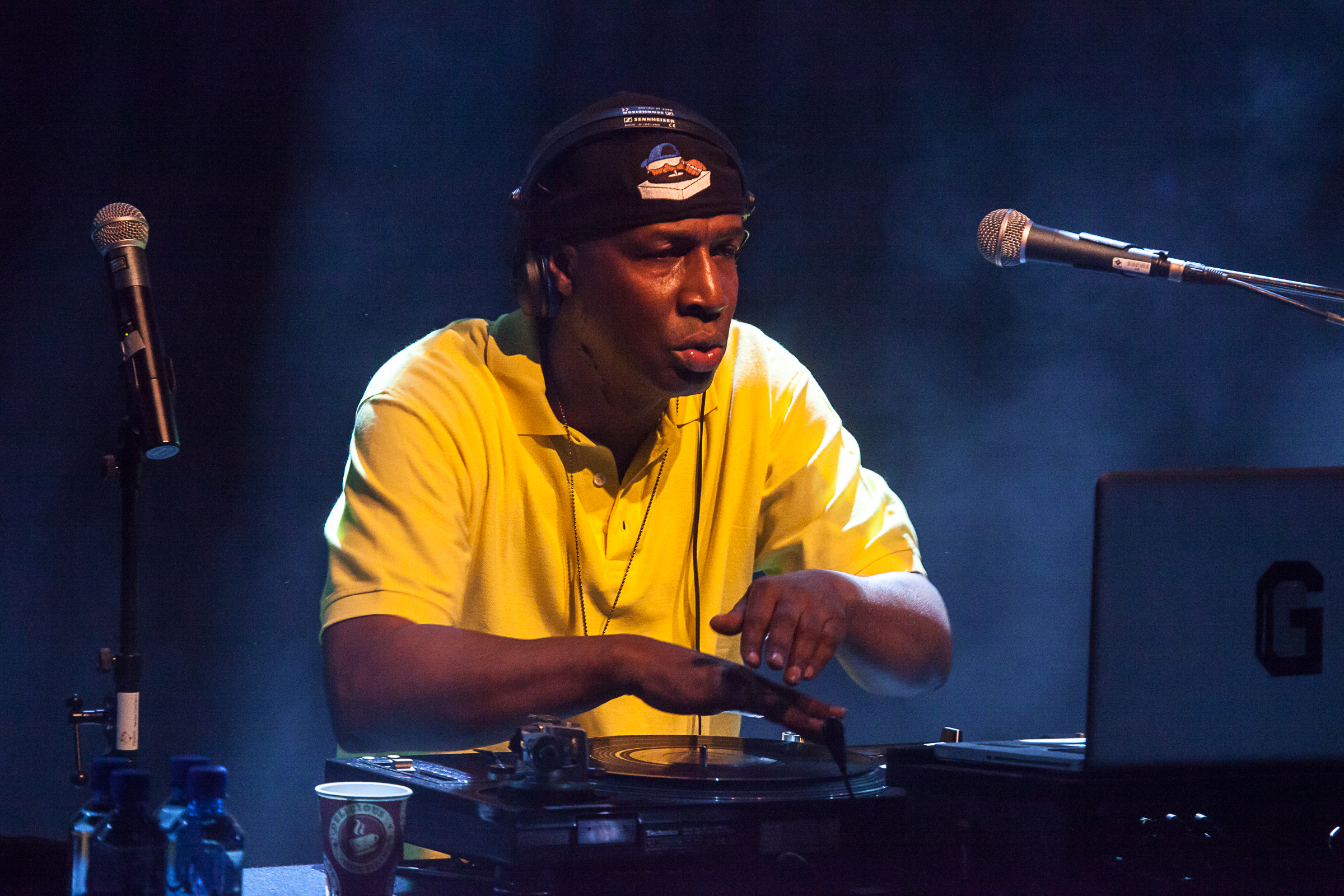
Grandmaster Flash pioneered many DJ techniques for freestyle rap.

In old school hip-hop, Kool Moe Dee claimed that improvisational rapping was instead called "coming off the top of the head", and Big Daddy Kane stated: "off-the-top-of-the-head [rapping], we just called that 'off the dome' – when you don't write it and [you] say whatever comes to mind."

Referring to this earlier definition (a written rhyme on non-specific subject matter), Big Daddy Kane stated, "that's really what a freestyle is" and Kool Moe Dee refers to it as "true" freestyle, and "the real old-school freestyle". Kool Moe Dee suggests that Kool G Rap's track "Men At Work" is an "excellent example" of true freestyle, along with Rakim's "Lyrics of Fury".

== Newer definition ==
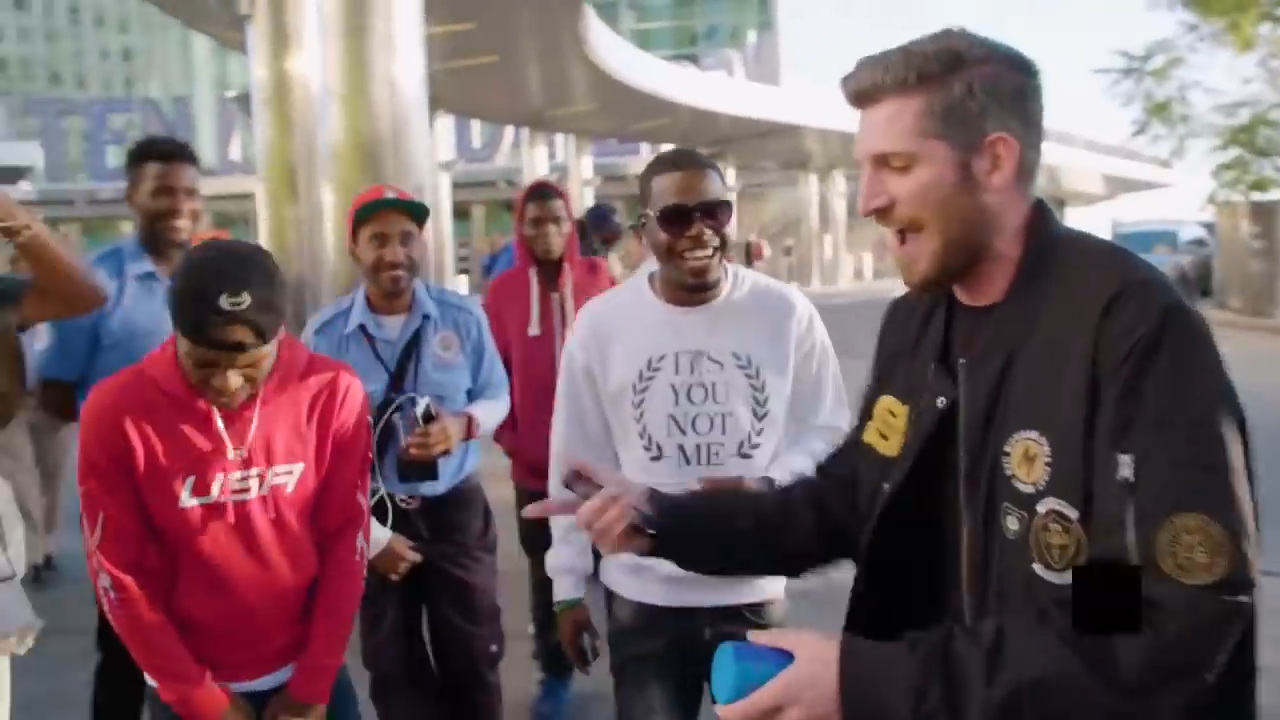
Harry Mack freestyles on the road in a series on YouTube that he calls "Guerrilla Bars."

Since the early 1990s onwards, with the popularization of improvisational rapping from groups and artists such as Freestyle Fellowship through to fresh fest competitions, "freestyle" has come to be the widely used term for rap lyrics that are improvised on the spot. This type of freestyle is the focus of Kevin Fitzgerald's documentary, Freestyle: The Art of Rhyme, where the term is used throughout by numerous artists to mean improvisational rapping.

Kool Moe Dee suggests the change in how the term is used happened somewhere in the mid- to late 1980s, saying that "until 1986, all freestyles were written", and "before the 1990s, it was about how hard you could come with a written rhyme with no particular subject matter and no real purpose other than showing your lyrical prowess."

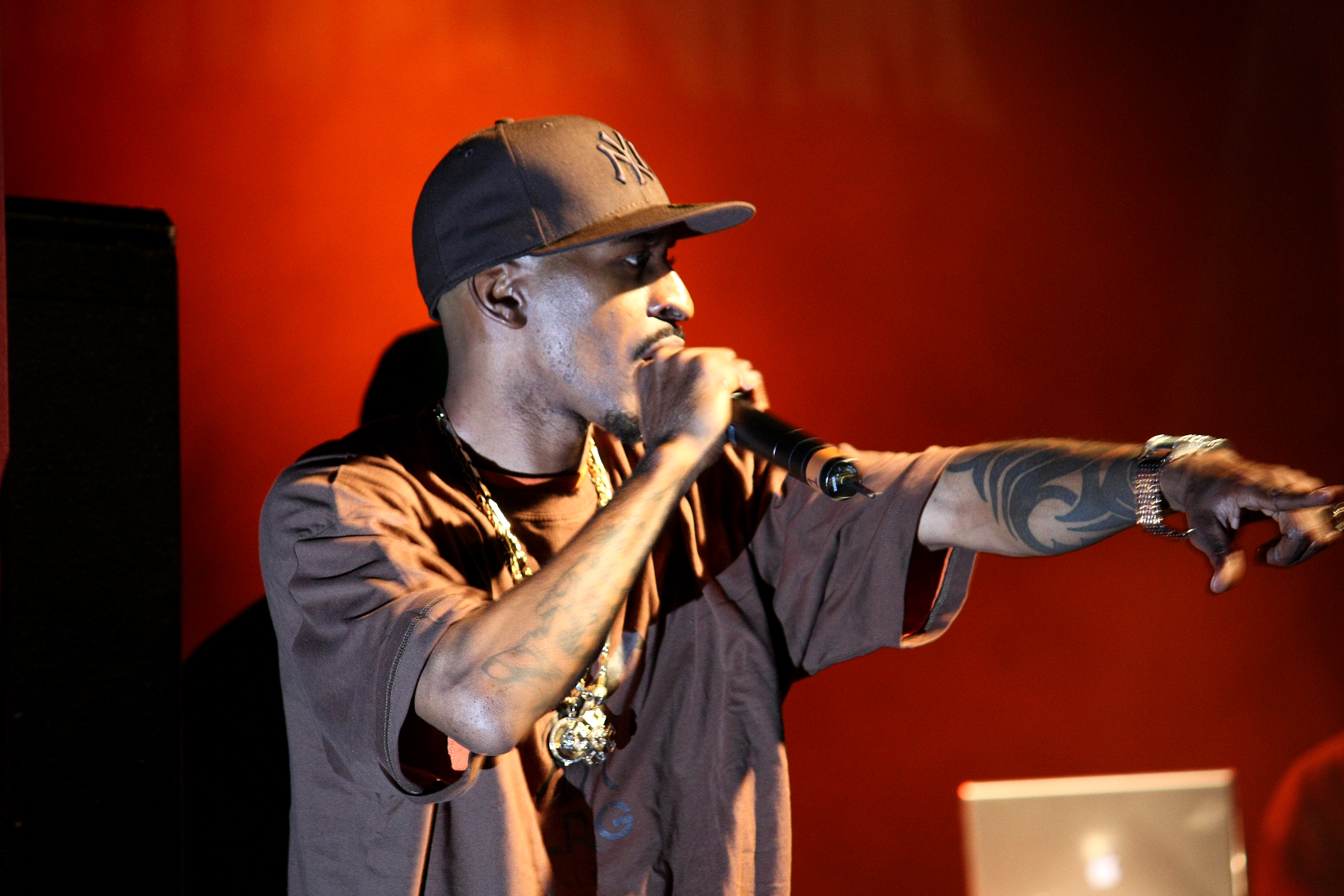
Rakim innovated many techniques used in freestyle.

Myka 9 explains that Freestyle Fellowship helped redefine the term – "that's what they say I helped do – I helped get the world to freestyle, me and the Freestyle Fellowship, by inventing the Freestyle Fellowship and by redefining what freestyle is... We have redefined what freestyle is by saying that it's improvisational rap like a jazz solo".

Although this kind of freestyling is very well respected today, Kool Moe Dee states that this was not the case previously:

A lot of the old-school artists didn't even respect what's being called freestyle now... any emcee coming off the top of the head wasn't really respected. The sentiment was emcees only did that if they couldn't write. The coming off the top of the head rhymer had a built-in excuse to not be critiqued as hard.

== Methodology of improvised freestyle ==
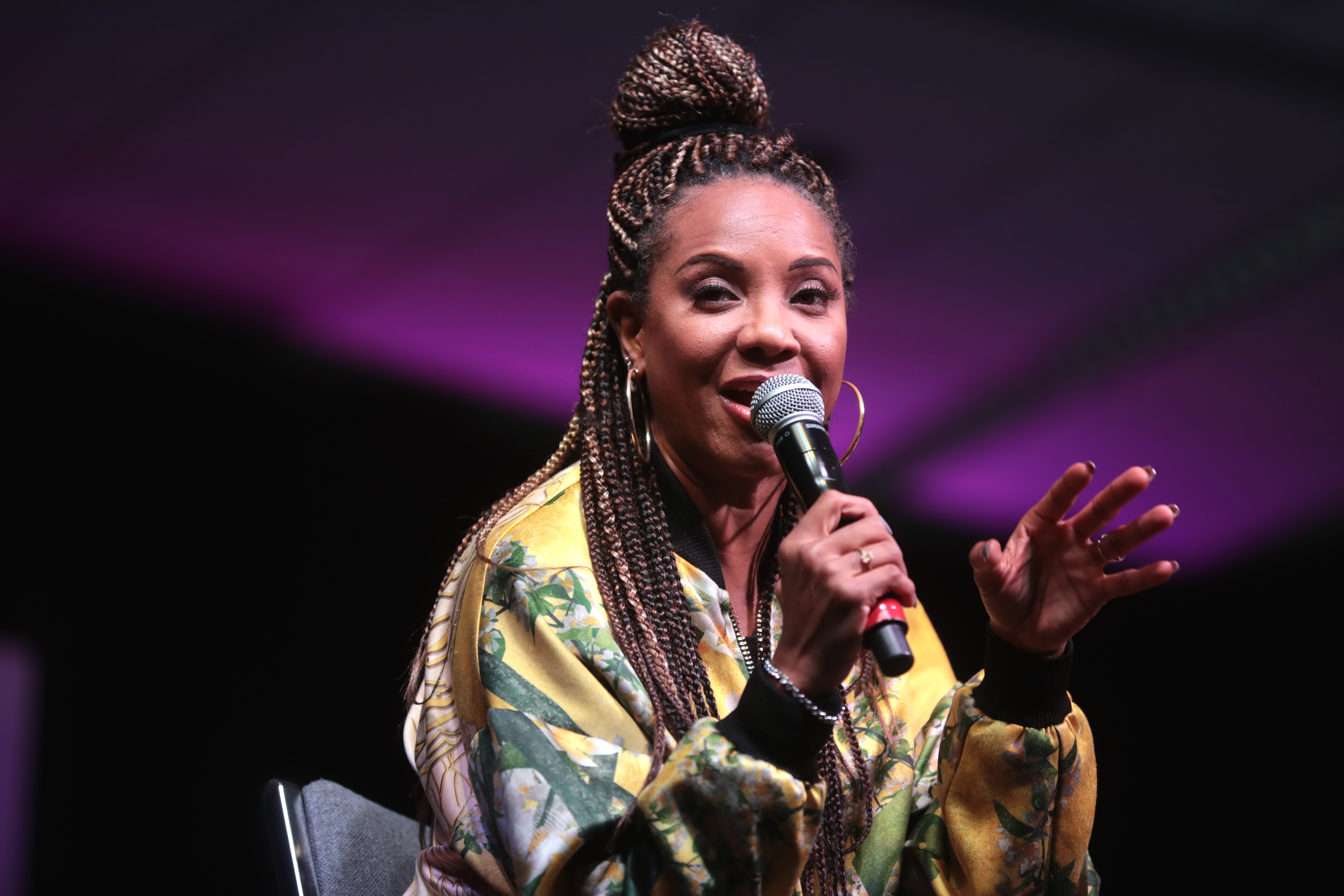
MC Lyte, the first female rapper to release a solo album, paved the way for generations of female freestylers like Queen Latifah and Missy Elliott.

Many rappers learn to rap through improvised freestyling, and by making freestyling into a conversation or a rhyming game which they play frequently as a way to practice, as described in the 2009 book How to Rap. Reasons for freestyling include entertainment, as a therapeutic activity, to discover different ways of rapping, promoting oneself, increasing versatility, or as a spiritual activity. Improvised freestyling can also be used in live performances, to do things such as giving something extra to the crowd and to cover up mistakes. To prove that a freestyle is being made up on the spot (as opposed to something pre-written or memorized), rappers will often refer to places and objects in their immediate setting, or will take suggestions on what to rhyme about.

Freestyles are performed a cappella, over beatboxing (as seen in Freestyle), or over instrumental versions of songs. Freestyling is often done in a group setting called a "cypher" (or "cipher") or as part of a "freestyle battle". Due to the improvised nature of freestyle, meter and rhythm are usually more relaxed than in conventional rapping. Many artists base their freestyle on their current situation or mental state, but have a ready supply of prepared lyrics and rhyme patterns they can use as filler. Freestyling can also be used as a songwriting method for albums or mixtapes.

== Types of freestyles ==
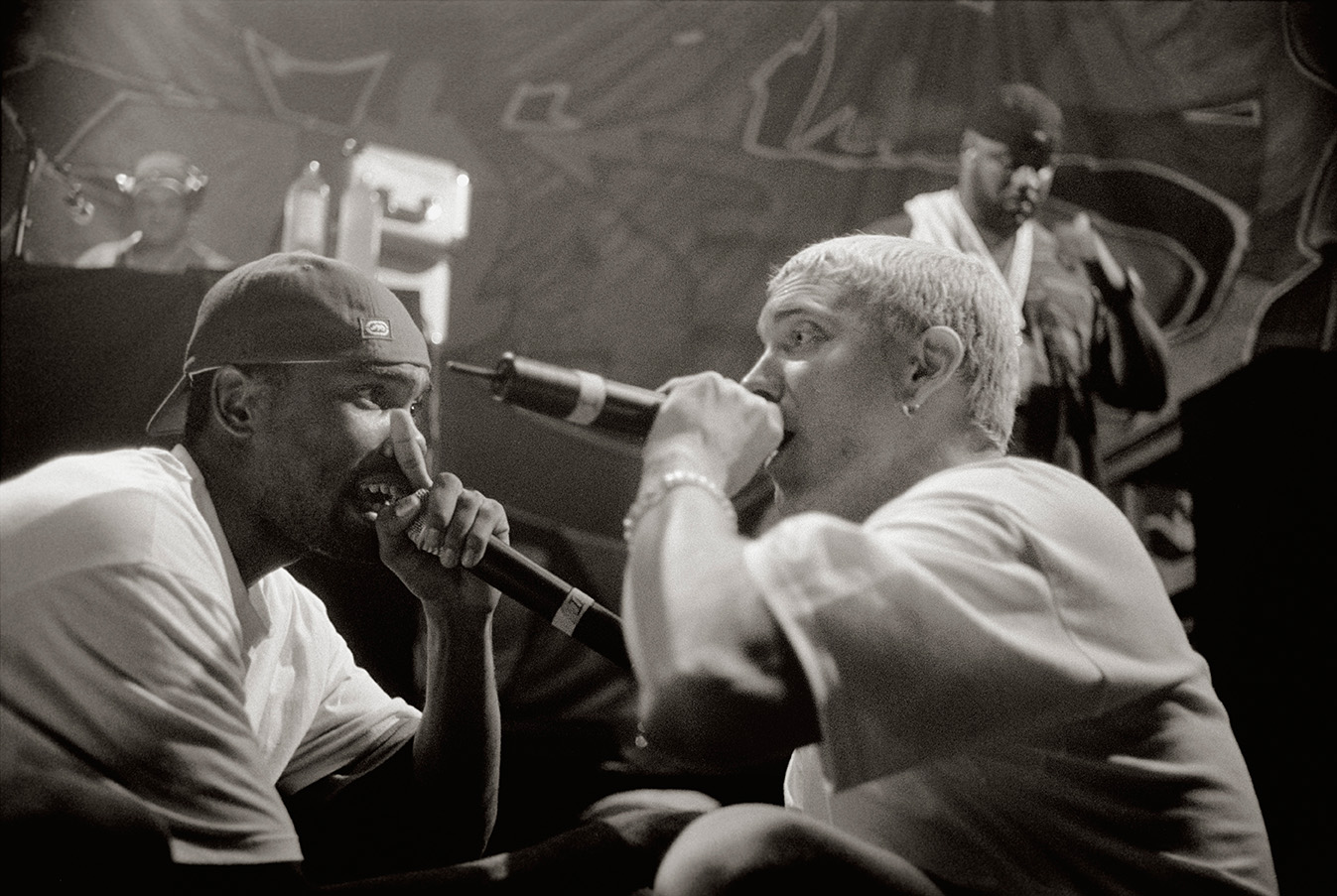
DJ Proof and Eminem grew up freestyle battling in Detroit. Some of these battles are featured in the 2002 film 8 Mile.

A freestyle battle is a contest in which two or more rappers or MCs compete or "battle" each other using improvised lyrics. It is a prominent part of contemporary Hip Hop culture and originated in the African-American community. In a freestyle battle, each competitor's goal is to "diss" their opponent through clever lyrics and wordplay, with heavy emphasis being placed upon the rapper's improvisational ability. Many battles also include metaphorically violent imagery, complementing the "battling" atmosphere. It is considered dishonorable or shameful to recite pre-written or memorized raps during a freestyle battle, because it shows the rapper to be incapable of "spitting" spur-of-the-moment lyrics. A live audience is key, as a large part of "winning" a battle is how an audience responds to each rapper. Appointed judges may be used in formal contests, but in most cases, the rapper who receives the largest audience response is viewed as the victor.

In modern times, with the rise of leagues such as King of the Dot and Ultimate Rap League, most battles are written, with some freestyling incorporated into the verses. This allows for more intricate rhymes and insults.

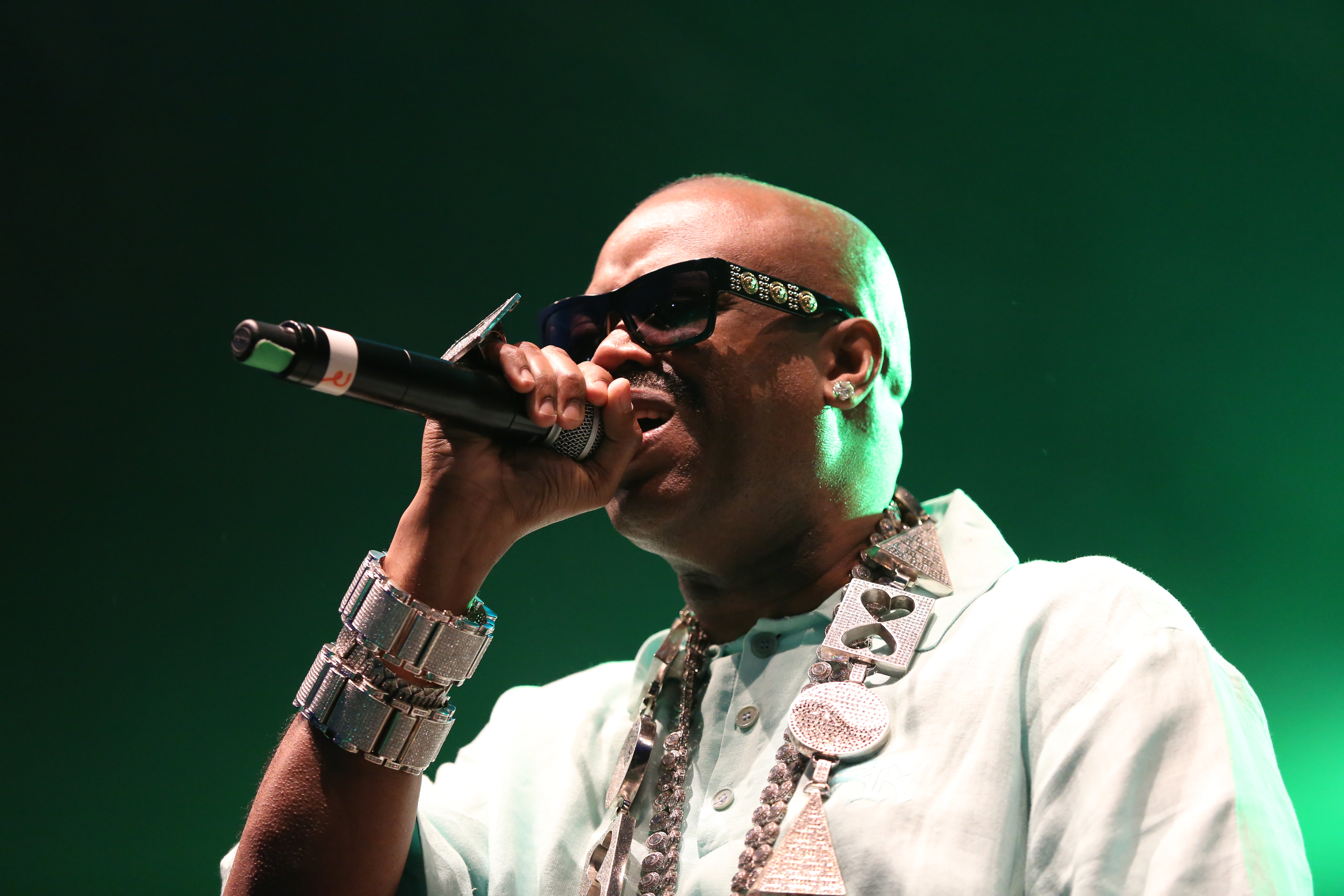
Slick Rick often told long stories in freestyle form.

As hip-hop evolved in the early 1980s, many rappers gained their fame through freestyle battles. Battles can take place anywhere: informally on street corners, on stage at a concert, at a school, or at events specifically meant for battling (such as Scribble Jam or the Blaze Battle).

A cypher or cipher is an informal gathering of rappers, beatboxers, and/or breakdancers in a circle, in order to jam musically together. The term has also in recent years come to mean the crowd that forms around freestyle battles, consisting of spectators and onlookers. This group serves partly to encourage competition and partly to enhance the communal aspect of rap battles. The cypher is known for "making or breaking reputations in the Hip Hop community; if you are able to step into the cypher and tell your story, demonstrating your uniqueness, you might be more accepted". These groups also serve as a way for messages about hip-hop styles and knowledge to be spread, through word-of-mouth and encouraging trends in other battles.

== Longest freestyle ==
On May 6, 2020, American rapper and slam poet George Watsky, best known for his rapid delivery, set the world record for longest freestyle at 33 hours, 33 minutes and 19 seconds. He held this record for three years, until Japanese rapper PONEY beat it in April 2023 at 48 hours.

== See also ==
- Battle rap
- Dance improvisation
- Dozens
- Musical improvisation
- Stream of consciousness (narrative mode)
- Stream of consciousness (psychology)
