= Brenna Flaugher =

Experimental cosmologist

Brenna Lynn Flaugher is an experimental cosmologist and a Distinguished Scientist Emeritus at Fermilab. Flaugher retired from Fermilab in 2024 as Associate Lab Director for Particle Physics, having previously headed the Astrophysics Department. Flaugher led the development of the Dark Energy Camera at the Víctor M. Blanco Telescope in Chile, part of the Dark Energy Survey; she was also involved in the development of the Dark Energy Spectroscopic Instrument at the Kitt Peak National Observatory in Arizona. By seeking a greater understanding of dark matter, she aims to explain the observed accelerating expansion of the universe.

== Education ==
Flaugher graduated from Bates College in 1983. She completed her doctorate at Rutgers University in 1989, under the supervision of Thomas J. Devlin.

== Recognition ==
Flaugher was named a Fellow of the American Physical Society (APS) in 2011, after a nomination by the APS Division of Astrophysics, "for her important contributions to experimental particle astrophysics, particularly her leadership of and seminal contributions to the design and construction of the Dark Energy Camera".

In 2020, Fermilab named Flaugher a distinguished scientist.
