= Nancy Devlin =

American psychologist and author (1929–2022)

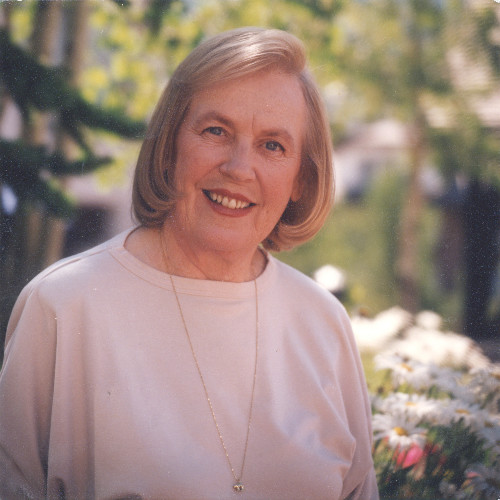
- Born: February 21. 1929
- Died: January 19, 2022 (aged 92)
- Occupations: Educational psychologist, author, columnist
- Known for: "Today’s Parents" column Parenting and education advocacy
- Spouse: Tom Devlin
- Children: Paul Devlin (producer); Tom Devlin; Mark Devlin

Nancy Devlin (February 21, 1929 – January 19, 2022) was an American educational psychologist, author, and columnist. She was born in Jenkintown, Pennsylvania, and grew up in Brooklyn, New York during the Great Depression.

She earned degrees from Hunter College and later received a doctorate in educational psychology from the University of California, Berkeley.

== Career ==
Devlin worked for more than 20 years as a psychologist in the Princeton public schools and lectured at Rutgers University.

== Publications ==
=== Columns and letters to the editor ===
Devlin became widely known for her weekly Today's Parents column in The Star-Ledger, writing nearly 700 articles on parenting, education, and child development during the 1980s and 1990s. Her work emphasized the importance of family relationships and communication between parents and children.

=== Selected columns ===
- New Jersey Opinion: The Dangers of Labeling Children
- Socially anxious? or Just Plain Shy?
- Turn off TV and Talk with Tot
- Parents should be involved in teacher selection
- Don't let ads con you into buying gifts that disappoint
- Individual assessment needed before deciding child makes grade
- Harsh discipline is never for a child's 'own good
- IQ tests don't measure innate intelligence
- Best role models teach children to 'Do as I do"
- Child's burnout at risk
- Too much homework can harm kids and parents
- Drawbacks to giving children all the best
- Homework fails to make the grade
- Helping kids develop and keep friendships
- Legacy of divorce need not be passed down
- Emphasis on SAT takes toll on students, schools
- No such thing as 'non-abusive spanking'

=== Books ===
- Cassandra's Classroom: Innovative Solutions For Education Reform (2012)
- Arrows Swift and Far – Guiding Your Child Through School: Essays on Education (2012)
- READ to me TALK to me LISTEN to me, Your Child’s First Three Years (2015)

== Travels and personal life ==
In the 1950s, Devlin taught children of U.S. military families in Germany, Denmark, and Japan. Afterward, she traveled across Asia, Africa, and South America.

She later married physicist Thomas J. Devlin. They had three sons: Paul Devlin, Tom Devlin, and Mark J. Devlin.

== Death ==
Devlin died in Philadelphia, Pennsylvania, on January 19, 2022, at the age of 92 after suffering a stroke.
