= Wilcox Solar Observatory =

Stanford University solar telescope

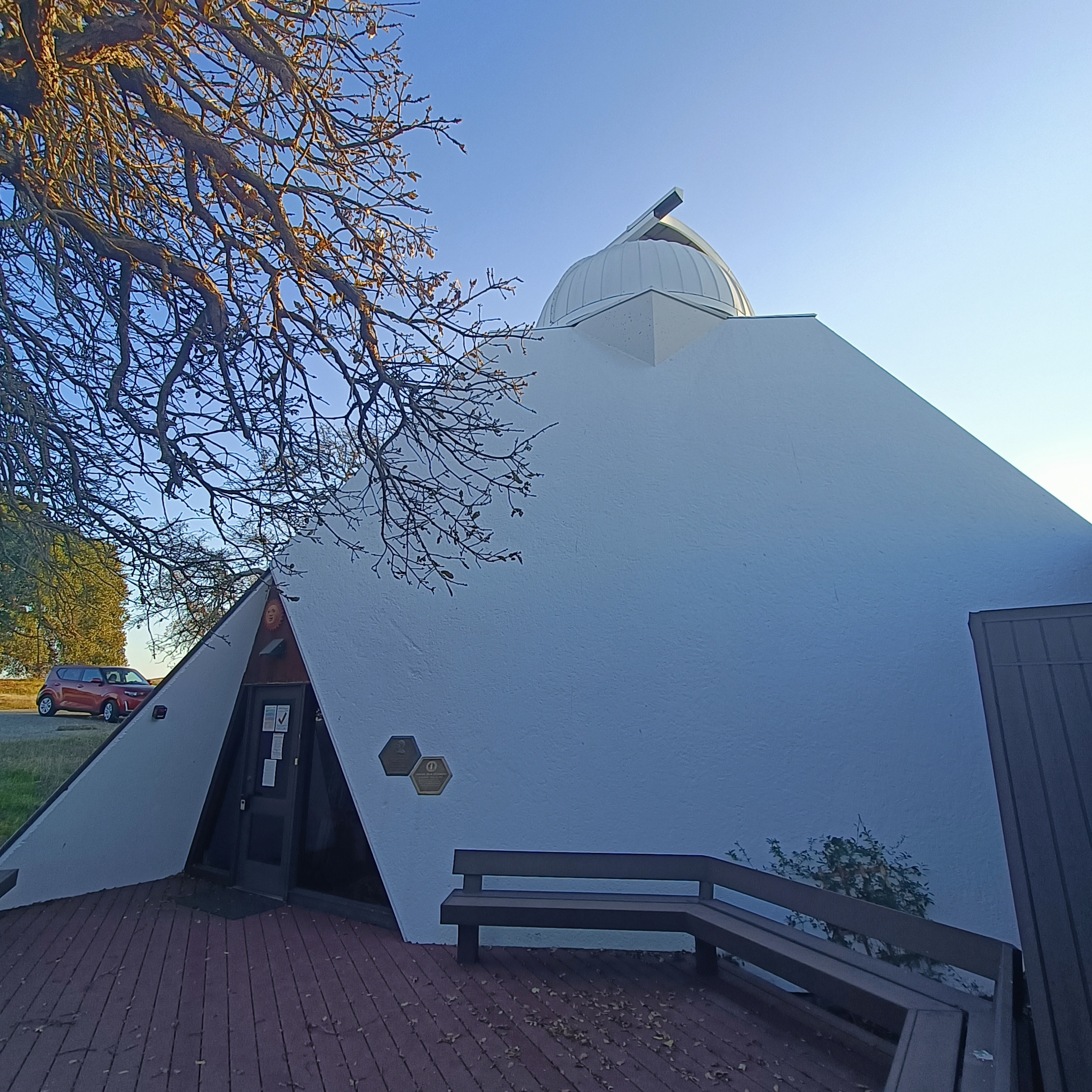
- Alternative names: WSO
- Location: California, Pacific States Region
- Coordinates: 37°24′33″N 122°10′04″W
- Diameter: 33 cm (1 ft 1 in)
- Website: wso.stanford.edu
- Location within California

The Wilcox Solar Observatory (WSO) is a solar observatory in Stanford, California that is used to produce daily observations of the magnetic and velocity field at the Sun's surface. It began daily observations of the Sun's mean magnetic field in May 1975. Formerly known as the Stanford Solar Observatory, it is operated by Stanford University and is located 2 kilometers (1.2 mi) south of the Stanford University campus. It would later be named after solar physicist John M. Wilcox. WSO has historically been funded by NASA Heliophysics, the National Science Foundation, and the Office of Naval Research.

WSO uses a Littrow spectrograph together with a Babcock magnetograph on the 5250 Å iron-1 spectral line, which it compares to the close by and magnetically insensitive iron-1 line at 5124 Å, to estimate the line-of-sight photospheric magnetic field to within 0.04 gauss.
