= Aerodyne Technologies =

French aircraft manufacturer

- Type: Privately held company
- Industry: Aerospace
- Founded: before 2002
- Defunct: 2008
- Fate: Out of business
- Headquarters: Étrembières, France
- Key people: Michel Le Blanc
- Products: Paragliders
- Parent: Aerodyne International Group

Aerodyne Technologies was a French aircraft manufacturer based in Étrembières and previously based in Talloires. The company specialized in the design and manufacture of paragliders and reserve parachutes.

The company seems to have been founded before 2002 and gone out of business in 2008. The company was owned by Aerodyne International Group, which was headed by Dominique Marcu and seems to also no longer exist.

Aerodyne Technologies was headed by Michel Le Blanc, who was formerly employed by paraglider manufacturers ITV Parapentes and Flying Planet.

While headquartered in France, Aerodyne Technologies had its gliders constructed in a newly built factory in Mauritius. The company constructed a full line of gliders, from the beginner Aerodyne Yogi to the high-performance Shaman and the two-place Totem Bi for flight training.

In 2003 the company's Jumbe glider was tested by South African reviewer Jaco Wolmarans in Annecy, France, against seven other competitor's gliders. He became very impressed with the stability and performance of the design in thermal flying and also with the company itself. He wrote, "I was so impressed by the company, after chatting to them about their range, workmanship and the like, that I offered to represent them in SA. They agreed."

In early 2008, just before it went out of business, the company had certified its Joy model in four sizes as EN B. The Aerodyne Free had been released as a beginner's aerobatic model and the Feel was undergoing testing for certification in the EN C category, at that time forecast for April 2008.

Eight different models of Aerodyne paragliders were flown by 45 pilots in 93 Paragliding World Cup competition races, between September 2002 and August 2011.

== Aircraft ==
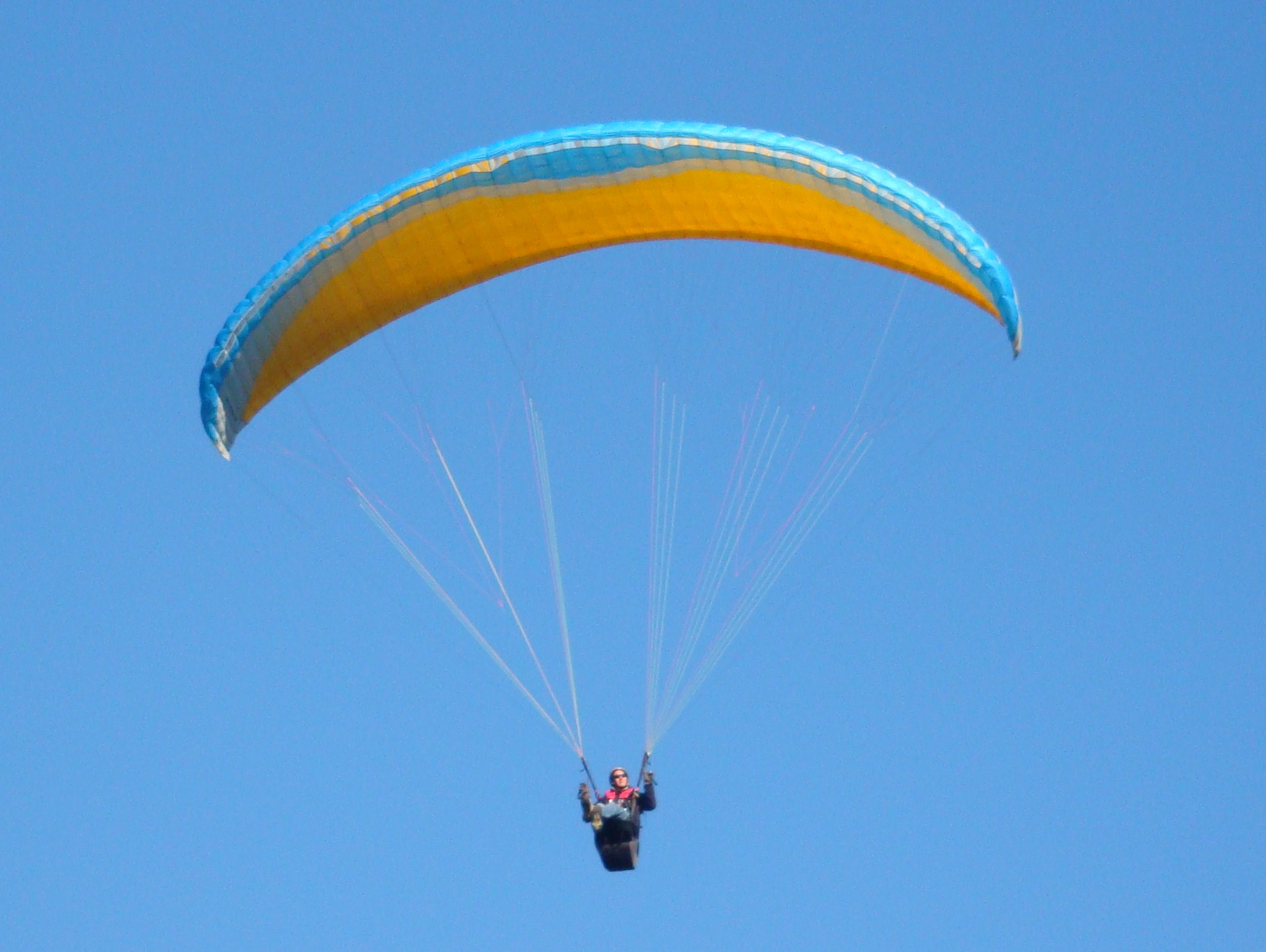
Aerodyne Shaolin paraglider

Paragliders built by Aerodyne Technologies:

- Aerodyne Blaster
- Aerodyne Cherokee
- Aerodyne Cool
- Aerodyne Dune
- Aerodyne Feel
- Aerodyne Free - beginner's aerobatic glider
- Aerodyne Freestyle
- Aerodyne Joy
- Aerodyne Jumbe
- Aerodyne Massai
- Aerodyne Shaman
- Aerodyne Shani
- Aerodyne Shaolin
- Aerodyne Shoot
- Aerodyne Totem Bi
- Aerodyne Yogi
