= Burton J. Moyer =

- Burton J. Moyer
- Born: Burton Jones Moyer; February 24, 1912; Greenville, Illinois
- Died: April 21, 1973 (aged 61); Eugene, Oregon
- Education: University of Washington
- Known for: Inventing enhanced radiation shielding and protections
- Board member of: National Research Council; National Science Foundation; Atomic Energy Commission
- Spouse: Lela Moyer (died 1975)
- Children: 3
- Scientific career
- Fields: Nuclear physics
- Workplaces: Greenville College (Professor; 1939–1942); Berkeley Radiation Laboratory (Researcher; 1942–1945); University of California at Berkeley (1942–1970); University of Oregon (1970–1973)
- Thesis: Design and operation of a small cyclotron (1939)
- Doctoral advisor: Donald Holt Loughridge
- Doctoral students: John M. Wilcox

Burton Jones Moyer (February 24, 1912 – April 21, 1973) was an American nuclear physicist known as "The Father of Accelerator Health Physics" for his seminal work in shielding design and safety procedures used in the operation of many large particle accelerators. He is notable for the discovery of the neutral pi meson.

Moyer was a professor of physics at the University of California at Berkeley, California; a researcher in high energy, particle, and nuclear physics at the UC Lawrence Radiation Laboratory (officially named Lawrence Berkeley National Laboratory in 1995); and Dean of the College of Arts and Sciences at the University of Oregon at Eugene, Oregon. He also consulted and advised at other research and educational institutions and government agencies including the National Science Foundation and the Atomic Energy Commission (AEC).

During World War II, Moyer worked in connection with the Manhattan Project, for a time at Oak Ridge, Tennessee, and later at the Lawrence Radiation Lab at Berkeley. He was a pioneer in the area of Health Physics with a focus on shielding and protection from the dangers of exposure to radiation for those working in nuclear research.

In 1947, Ernest Lawrence asked Moyer to oversee radiation protection activities at the Radiation Lab at Berkeley. Moyer’s contributions were instrumental in ensuring the safety of researchers. Notably, in 1962, he implemented shielding modifications at the bevatron—one of the large particle accelerators at the laboratory—reducing radiation intensities by a factor of 100. His innovative approach incorporating specialized shielding and frequent measurement of radiation levels in the work environment became known as the “Moyer Model” and is frequently applied in the construction and operation of nuclear particle accelerators around the world. Moyer directed the Health Physics activities at the Lawrence Radiation Laboratory until 1970.

In 1985 the Northern California Chapter of the Health Physics Society established the Burton J. Moyer Memorial Fellowship to memorialize Moyer and to encourage his ideals in the study of the safe use of radiation for the benefit of all people.

== Early life ==
Burton Jones Moyer was born in Greenville, Illinois, on February 24, 1912. His parents were Jacob and Ella Mabel Moyer (nee Jones), who were faculty members at Greenville College (now Greenville University) in Greenville, Illinois. Sometime before 1920 his family moved to Fargo, North Dakota, where his father taught chemistry at the North Dakota Agricultural College (now North Dakota State University). Around 1925 the family moved to Seattle, Washington, where Jacob taught chemistry at Seattle Pacific College (Seattle Pacific University since 1977) and served as the Dean of Men. Burton finished his High School education at the normal school associated with SPC and earned his BA degree from the college in 1933. The following year he began graduate studies at the University of Washington culminating with his Ph.D. in Physics in 1939.

== Career ==
After obtaining his graduate degree Moyer joined the faculty at Greenville College and taught in the departments of mathematics and physics. In 1942 he and his family moved to Berkeley, California, where he worked under Ernest Lawrence at the Lawrence Radiation Laboratory on the separation of uranium isotopes, among other things. He became a group leader at the Berkeley Rad Lab.

In addition to his work at Berkeley, Moyer spent time in Oak Ridge, Tennessee, in the operation of the electromagnetic separation plant as part of the Manhattan Project. At the close of the war he returned to the Radiation Laboratory in Berkeley, doing research in nuclear and high energy physics. Simultaneously he began teaching in the physics department as lecturer, was appointed associate professor in 1950 and professor in 1954. By this time, a series of papers had established Moyer as one of the world's leading high energy physicists. Perhaps the best-known paper appeared in 1950 under the modest title, “High Energy Photons from Proton Nucleon Collisions,” announcing the discovery of the neutral pi meson for which he is credited. This was a milestone in the science of particle physics.

In 1962, at the urging of his colleagues, Moyer accepted the chairmanship of the physics department at Berkeley. He served in that position until 1968 except for the time of his sabbatical in 1965-66. In addition to his departmental duties, he was able to meet the troubling problems of student unrest at Berkeley which began in 1964.

In 1965 Moyer opted for a one-year sabbatical. Working through the United States Aid to International Development (USAID), he took a position at the Indian Institute of Technology at Kanpur, India. He spent the year teaching physics, aiding the research program, and helping to create a viable technical school.

== Personal life ==
Moyer was a devout Christian. He found no conflict between the tenets of his faith and a rigorous, scientific exploration of the universe. His maternal grandfather, Burton Rensselaer Jones, was a Free Methodist missionary and bishop. Both Greenville College and Seattle Pacific were Free Methodist institutions. Sometime after his work at Greenville, Moyer joined the Presbyterian church where he served as an elder for over 20 years.

== Later life and death ==
In 1968 Moyer retired from the Physics Department chairmanship at Berkeley and returned to his research group and to teaching as well as to work with the National Science Foundation (NSF) and Atomic Energy Commission (AEC). He, along with A. Carl Helmholz, undertook the revision of the text Mechanics: Vol 1 of the Berkeley Physics Course. In 1970, he left the university at Berkeley and accepted the position of Dean of the College of Arts and Sciences at the University of Oregon in Eugene, Oregon.

Moyer died from a heart attack on April 21, 1973. His wife, Lela, died three years later. They are interred together in Eugene, Oregon. They had four children.

== Select bibliography ==
Year	Citation	Score
1970	Richards WB, Chiu CB, Eandi RD, Helmholz AC, Kenney RW, Moyer BJ, Poirier JA, Cence RJ, Peterson VZ, Sehgal NK, Stenger VJ. Production and neutral decay of the meson in -p collisions Physical Review D. 1: 10-19. DOI: 10.1103/Physrevd.1.10	0.701
1967	Cence RJ, Peterson VZ, Stenger VJ, Chiu CB, Eandi RD, Helmholz AC, Kenney RW, Moyer BJ, Poirier JA, Richards WB. Branching RatioΓ(η→3π0)Γ(η→2γ)Measured Using a4πSpark Chamber Physical Review Letters. 20: 175-175. DOI: 10.1103/Physrevlett.20.175.2	0.537
1967	Cence RJ, Peterson VZ, Stenger VJ, Chiu CB, Eandi RD, Helmholz AC, Kenney RW, Moyer BJ, Poirier JA, Richards WB. Branching ratio Γ(η→3π0)Γ(η→2γ) measured using a 4π spark chamber Physical Review Letters. 19: 1393-1395. DOI: 10.1103/Physrevlett.19.1393	0.551
1967	Chiu CB, Eandi RD, Helmholz AC, Kenney RW, Moyer BJ, Poirier JA, Richards WB, Cence RJ, Peterson VZ, Sehgal NK, Stenger VJ. Pion-proton charge-exchange scattering from 500 to 1300 MeV Physical Review. 156: 1415-1426. DOI: 10.1103/Physrev.156.1415	0.698
1966	Richards WB, Chiu CB, Eandi RD, Helmholz AC, Kenney RW, Moyer BJ, Poirier JA, Cence RJ, Peterson VZ, Sehgal NK, Stenger VJ. Total and differential cross sections for π-+p→η+n from threshold to 1300 MeV Physical Review Letters. 16: 1221-1223. DOI: 10.1103/Physrevlett.16.1221	0.713
1966	McManigal PG, Eandi RD, Kaplan SN, Moyer BJ. Polarization in proton-proton scatterings at 735 MeV Physical Review. 148: 1280-1281. DOI: 10.1103/Physrev.148.1280	0.456
1965	McManigal PG, Eandi RD, Kaplan SN, Moyer BJ. Polarization and differential cross sections in proton-proton and proton-nucleus scatterings at 725 MeV Physical Review. 137: B620-B629. DOI: 10.1103/Physrev.137.B620	0.482
1964	Eandi RD, Devlin TJ, Kenney RW, McManigal PG, Moyer BJ. Polarization of recoil protons in p elastic scattering near 600 MeV Physical Review. 136: B536-B542. DOI: 10.1103/Physrev.136.B536	0.676
1964	Eandi RD, Devlin TJ, Kenney RW, McManigal PG, Moyer BJ. Polarization of recoil protons in π±p elastic scattering at 864, 981, and 1301 MeV Physical Review. 136: B1187-B1189. DOI: 10.1103/Physrev.136.B1187	0.671
1964	Helland JA, Wood CD, Devlin TJ, Hagge DE, Longo MJ, Moyer BJ, Perez-Mendez V. Elastic scattering of negative pions on protons in the energy range 500-1000 MeV Physical Review. 134: B1079-B1086. DOI: 10.1103/PhysRev.134.B1079	0.605
1964	Helland JA, Devlin TJ, Hagge DE, Longo MJ, Moyer BJ, Wood CD. Elastic scattering of positive pions by protons in the energy range 500-1600 MeV Physical Review. 134: B1062-B1078. DOI: 10.1103/Physrev.134.B1062	0.757
1963	Helland JA, Devlin TJ, Hagge DE, Longo MJ, Moyer BJ, Wood CD. Angular distributions in π±-p elastic scattering in the range 500 to 1600 MeV Physical Review Letters. 10: 27-29. DOI: 10.1103/Physrevlett.10.27	0.749
1963	Cence RJ, Lind DL, Mead GD, Moyer BJ. Neutral-pion production from proton-proton collisions at 735 MeV Physical Review. 131: 2713-2718. DOI: 10.1103/Physrev.131.2713	0.498
1963	Cohen D, Moyer BJ, Shaw HC, Waddell CN. Bremsstrahlung from proton bombardment of nuclei Physical Review. 130: 1505-1511. DOI: 10.1103/Physrev.130.1505	0.458
1962	Longo MJ, Moyer BJ. Total cross sections of negative pions in the momentum range 2 to 5 BeV/c Physical Review Letters. 9: 466-468. DOI: 10.1103/Physrevlett.9.466	0.625
1962	Longo MJ, Moyer BJ. Nucleon and nuclear cross sections for positive pions and protons above 1.4 bev/c Physical Review. 125: 701-713. DOI: 10.1103/Physrev.125.701	0.424
1962	Devlin TJ, Moyer BJ, Perez-Mendez V. -p total cross sections in the range 450 to 1650 Mev Physical Review. 125: 690-700. DOI: 10.1103/Physrev.125.690	0.635
1961	Moyer BJ. Pi - p elastic scattering in the energy region 500-1500 Mev Reviews of Modern Physics. 33: 367-373. DOI: 10.1103/Revmodphys.33.367	0.443
1961	Wood CD, Devlin TJ, Helland JA, Longo MJ, Moyer BJ, Perez-Mendez V. - P elastic scattering at 550, 600, 720, 900, and 1020 Mev Physical Review Letters. 6: 481-483. DOI: 10.1103/Physrevlett.6.481	0.712
1960	Adelson HE, Bostick HA, Moyer BJ, Waddell CN. Use of the four-inch liquid hydrogen bubble chamber as a fast-neutron spectrometer Review of Scientific Instruments. 31: 1-10. DOI: 10.1063/1.1716782	0.382
1959	Longo MJ, Helland JA, Hess WN, Moyer BJ, Perez-Mendez V. High-energy total cross sections for positive pions and protons on hydrogen Physical Review Letters. 3: 568-570. DOI: 10.1103/Physrevlett.3.568	0.407
1958	Tai YK, Millburn GP, Kaplan SN, Moyer BJ. Neutron yields from thick targets bombarded by 18- and 32-Mev protons Physical Review. 109: 2086-2091. DOI: 10.1103/Physrev.109.2086	0.416
1957	Moyer BJ, Squire RK. Characteristics of 0 production from proton-proton collisions near threshold Physical Review. 107: 283-290. DOI: 10.1103/Physrev.107.283	0.403
1957	Bandtel KC, Frank WJ, Moyer BJ. Comparison of the reactions p+d→H3+π+, p+d→He3+π0 as a test of charge independence Physical Review. 106: 802-808. DOI: 10.1103/Physrev.106.802	0.412
1957	Brabant JM, Moyer BJ, Wallace R. Lead glass Čerenkov radiation photon spectrometer Review of Scientific Instruments. 28: 421-424. DOI: 10.1063/1.1715896	0.34
1956	Brabant JM, Cork B, Horwitz N, Moyer BJ, Murray JJ, Wallace R, Wenzel WA. Interactions of Antiprotons in Lead Glass Physical Review. 102: 1622-1626. DOI: 10.1103/Physrev.102.1622	0.328
1956	Brabant JM, Cork B, Horowitz N, Moyer BJ, Murray JJ, Wallace R, Wenzel WA. Terminal observations on "antiprotons" [10] Physical Review. 101: 498-501. DOI: 10.1103/Physrev.101.498	0.341
1956	Hess WN, Moyer BJ. Production of deuterons in high-energy nucleon bombardment of nuclei and its bearing on nuclear charge distribution Physical Review. 101: 337-350. DOI: 10.1103/Physrev.101.337	0.374
1955	Wilcox JM, Moyer BJ. Nuclear internal momentum distributions Physical Review. 99: 875-885. DOI: 10.1103/PhysRev.99.875	0.521
1953	Crandall WE, Moyer BJ. Characteristics of neutral meson production in the proton bombardment of carbon nuclei Physical Review. 92: 749-758. DOI: 10.1103/Physrev.92.749	0.318
1952	Richardson RE, Ball WP, Leith CE, Moyer BJ. Nuclear elastic scattering of high energy protons Physical Review. 86: 29-41. DOI: 10.1103/PhysRev.86.29	0.34
1952	Hales RW, Hildebrand RH, Knable N, Moyer BJ. The yield of neutral mesons from proton bombardment of light nuclei [10] Physical Review. 85: 373-374. DOI: 10.1103/PhysRev.85.373	0.583
1951	Chew GF, Moyer BJ. High Energy Nucleon-Nucleon Scattering Experiments at Berkeley American Journal of Physics. 19: 203-211. DOI: 10.1119/1.1932774	0.319
1951	Richardson RE, Ball WP, Leith CE, Moyer BJ. Elastic scattering of 340-mev protons [31] Physical Review. 83: 859-860. DOI: 10.1103/PhysRev.83.859	0.374
1951	DeJuren J, Moyer BJ. Variation with energy of nuclear collision cross sections for high energy neutrons Physical Review. 81: 919-923. DOI: 10.1103/Physrev.81.919	0.447
1950	Bratenahl A, Fernbach S, Hildebrand RH, Leith CE, Moyer BJ. Elastic scattering of 84-Mev neutrons Physical Review. 77: 597-605. DOI: 10.1103/PhysRev.77.597	0.65
1947	Hildebrand R, Moyer BJ. Preliminary data on absorption of high energy neutrons from the 184-inch cyclotron [10] Physical Review. 72: 1258-1260. DOI: 10.1103/Physrev.72.1258	

== Texts ==
- Berkeley Physics Course, Vol. 1 Charles Kittel, Walter D. Knight, Malvin A. Ruderman, A. Carl Helmholz, Burton J. Moyer Berkeley (1973, Mc Graw Hill Book Company)
