= Fender Aerodyne Jazz Bass =

Electric bass guitar created by Fender

Aerodyne Jazz Bass
- Manufacturer: Fender
- Period: 2003 — 2022

Construction
- Body type: Solid
- Neck joint: Bolt-on

Woods
- Body: Basswood (Unique Radius/Carved Top)
- Neck: Maple
- Fretboard: Rosewood

Hardware
- Bridge: Fixed
- Pickup(s): One split single-coil Precision Bass Pickup (Mid), one single-coil Jazz Bass Pickup (Bridge).

Colors available
- Black

The Fender Aerodyne Jazz Bass is an electric bass guitar created by Fender and was first introduced at the NAMM Show in 2003. In 2022, Fender discontinued the Aerodyne after nearly 20 years of production.

The Aerodyne Jazz Bass is usually equipped with a split single-coil 'p-bass' pickup at the mid position and a single-coil pickup from a Jazz Bass at the bridge position. A number of Japanese domestic market 'non-export' models also come in a standard Jazz Bass' configuration. The bass is fitted with one volume knob per pickup, plus a master tone knob. The body outline is shaped like the Jazz Bass, though substantially lighter (the Aerodyne Jazz Bass weighs about 7 pounds, compared to the 10 pounds of the standard Jazz Bass). It's also slightly thinner than a traditional Jazz Bass body, due to its unusual 39 inch top radius unique to the Aerodyne series. The radius of the top means that the bridge is actually inset slightly into the top of the body. The Aerodyne Jazz Bass has a standard 1.5-inch nut width, a very slim C-shaped neck and 20 medium jumbo frets.

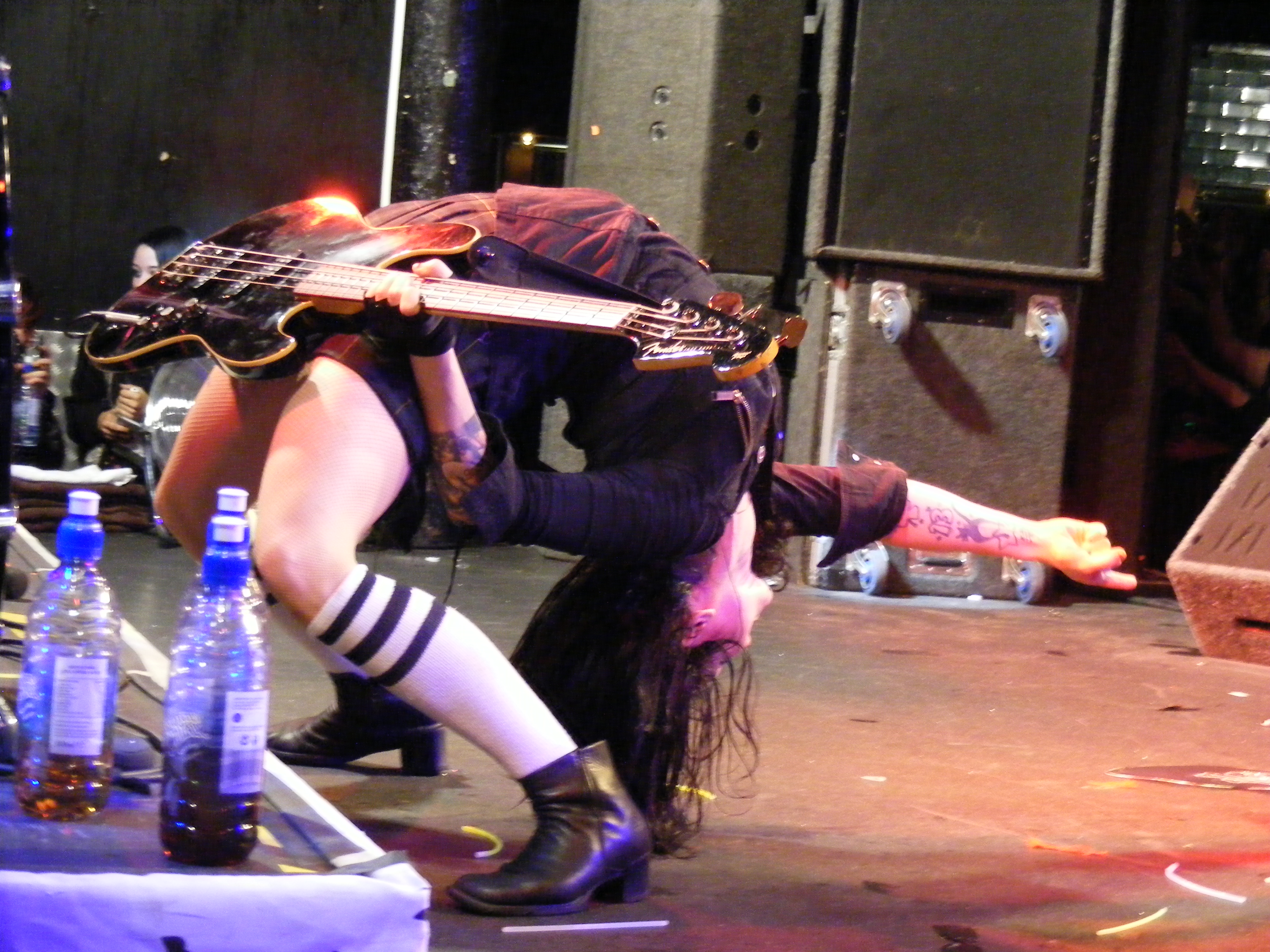
Lindsey Way (Lyn-Z) of Mindless Self Indulgence playing an Aerodyne Jazz bass.

The Aerodyne Jazz Bass has various cosmetic features that differ greatly from similar Fender basses. The 'export model' is only available in black, with a matching black headstock facing, smoked chrome hardware and no pickguard. The neck features dot inlays, but only on the side; the fretboard has no markers on the front. There is cream binding that goes around the front perimeter of the body and newer instruments have a Stratocaster output jack while the earlier instruments have a quarter-inch jack mounted directly in the wood on top of the body.

== Fender Aerodyne Classic Precision Bass Special ==
This variant has a radiused, carved basswood Precision Bass body with cream binding and flamed maple top, P/J pickups, Jazz Bass neck with a 20-fret stained rosewood fingerboard with aged pearloid dot inlays, matching headstock and a 3-ply white pickguard. It was introduced in 2006, and was offered in Natural, Blue, and Crimson Red Transparent finishes.

== Fender Aerodyne Jazz Bass (Japan non export model) ==
This version of the Aerodyne Jazz features a radiused, carved basswood Jazz Bass body with cream binding in a non transparent finish, matching painted headstock, "C" shape Jazz Bass neck with a 20-fret stained rosewood fingerboard with aged pearloid dot inlays, P/J pickups, a 3-ply black/white/black pickguard, and a chrome Jazz style control plate with chrome knobs and output jack. It was introduced in 2006 as a Japanese non export model, available in Black, Dolphin Grey (metallic), Old Candy Apple Red (metallic), Lake Placid Blue and Cream (with black bindings).

== Fender Aerodyne Medium Scale Jazz Bass (Japan non export model) ==
This version of the Aerodyne Jazz is similar to the other Japan non-export models, except that it has two (DiMarzio-designed, but manufactured in Japan) J-style pickups instead of a stock P/J pickup configuration. It also has a medium 32"-scale length (812,8 mm) which plays just like a regular Jazz Bass with a capo at the first fret. The medium scale permits the use of slightly heavier gauge strings while retaining the same "feel" (string tension) as a standard long 34"-scale bass. Production of this model began in 2003 (prior to the introduction of the USA model) and the earliest examples had the model number AJB-90M/DJ. In 2007, the medium scale bass acquired the model number AJB-M/DJ and was offered in Black, Olympic White and Gun Metal Blue. Discontinued in early 2008.

== Literature ==
- Peter Bertges: The Fender Reference; Bomots, Saarbrücken 2007, ISBN 978-3-939316-38-1
