= Ghetto Blaster (video game) =

1985 video game

- Cover art
- Publishers: NA: Virgin Games; EU: Virgin Games
- Designers: Tony Gibson; Mark Harrison
- Platform: Commodore 64
- Release: EU: 1985; NA: 1985
- Genre: Action
- Mode: Single-player

"Ghetto Blaster" is a computer game that was released for the Commodore 64 in 1985. It was developed by two former employees of Taskset, a software house, Tony Gibson and Mark Harrison.

== Gameplay and Story ==
Rockin' Rodney is the player character and protagonist of the game, and has been employed as a courier for the fictional record company Interdisc. The player must find and collect batteries for their ghetto blaster and afterwards locate ten cassette tape demos of dance music. When this is done, the player must get people to dance to the tape demos by listening to them on their boombox. The main aim of the game is to deliver the tapes to Interdisc by navigating through a maze of streets, alleyways, and cul-de-sacs, which are laid out and populated by various characters.

The street names are named after famous songs (e.g. "Blackberry Way", "Desolation Row"). A map is provided in the cassette inlay, and some of the characters reference others.

== Reception ==
Zzap!64 praised the game's music and gameplay, but criticized its repetitive nature and lack of a real scoring system, which removes any potential replay value.
