= Aerodyne Blaster =

Blaster

General information
- Type: Paraglider
- National origin: France
- Manufacturer: Aerodyne Technologies
- Designer: Michel Le Blanc
- Status: Production completed

The Aerodyne Blaster is a series of French single-place paragliders that were designed by Michel Le Blanc and produced by Aerodyne Technologies of Talloires.

== Design and development ==
The Blaster was designed as a competition glider, with three models, each named for their relative size. The small and medium sizes were developed first and AFNOR certified, followed by the large size, which was certified last.

The design was certified by the French FFVl in 2003 as a competition glider.

== Operational history ==
In the 2003 Canungra Cup held in Australia, James Lawson of Australia placed 7th on a Blaster on task one in a field of 47.

In the 2003 IPC held in Chopok, Slovakia, Aleksander Talbierz competed for Poland, coming in 52nd out of a field of 53 competitors.

Yoshiyuki Sato competed on a Blaster in the 2004 Pan Pacific Open in Tsukuba, Ibaraki, Japan and also in the Japanese Spring Cup.

In the Pre-Paragliding World Championships held in Sopot, Bulgaria in 2004, David Snowden competed for Great Britain on a Blaster, finishing 15th out of a field of 106 in Task 5.

Osa Kuroda competed on a Blaster in the 2008 Yoshinogawa Cup, placing 24th on task 1 in a field of 59 competitors, 26th on task 2 of 60 and finishing the competition in 45th place of 60.

Blasters were flown by nine pilots in 22 Paragliding World Cup competition races, between September 2002 and July 2007.

== Variants ==
Blaster S
Small-sized model for lighter pilots. Its 11.96 m (39.2 ft) span wing has a wing area of 23.62 m^{2} (254.2 sq ft), 75 cells and the aspect ratio is 6.37:1. The glider model is AFNOR Com certified.
Blaster M
Mid-sized model for medium-weight pilots. Its 12.80 m (42.0 ft) span wing has a wing area of 25.74 m^{2} (277.1 sq ft), 75 cells and the aspect ratio is 6.37:1. The pilot weight range is 90 to 106 kg (198 to 234 lb). The glider model is AFNOR Com certified.
Blaster L
Large-sized model for heavier pilots. Its 13.20 m (43.3 ft) span wing has a wing area of 27.36 m^{2} (294.5 sq ft), 75 cells and the aspect ratio is 6.37:1. The glider model is AFNOR Com certified.

== Specifications (Blaster M) ==
Data from Bertrand

General characteristics

- Crew: one
- Wingspan: 12.80 m (42 ft 0 in)
- Wing area: 25.74 m^{2} (277.1 sq ft)
- Aspect ratio: 6.37:1

Performance

- Maximum speed: 56 km/h (35 mph, 30 kn)
