= Power Trip (film) =

2003 documentary film

- Promotional poster
- Directed by: Paul Devlin
- Produced by: Claire Missanelli; Valery Odikadze
- Starring: Piers Lewis
- Music by: Christopher S. Parker
- Release date: February 14, 2003 (Berlin)
- Running time: 86 minutes
- Country: United States

Power Trip is a documentary film by director Paul Devlin that describes the electricity crisis in the country of Georgia several years after the fall of the Soviet Union. In 1999, Georgia's government sold the electric utility company Telasi to AES Corporation, a multinational company headquartered in Virginia. The film follows several AES-Telasi employees as the company tries to turn a profit and ensure that power is consistently available to customers in the face of widespread corruption and failure to pay electricity bills by both commercial and residential customers. According to AES-Telasi staff, 90% of customers were not paying for electricity when the company took over, partly because salaries were extremely low and partly because during the Soviet era, the state had provided free electricity. The film shows many shocking pictures of illegal wiring that people rigged up to steal electricity from buildings with power, creating serious safety hazards and straining the power grid. Government corruption ensured that some companies received electricity even if they did not pay for it for years. The film looks at the chaos and riots that occurred in Tbilisi after AES-Telasi started cutting off electricity to customers with unpaid bills. The film exposes corruption in the highest levels of government as well as the plight of the Georgian people as they struggle for power. The film ends by noting that AES Corporation, having spent many tens of millions of dollars yet with profitability nowhere in sight, sold Telasi to a Russian company.

== Screening and reception ==
Power Trip has screened in 60 countries, theatrically across the United States and on PBS's Independent Lens. The film was nominated for an Independent Spirit Award in 2003, and has won 10 film festival awards, including top prizes at the Berlin International Film Festival, Hot Docs (Best International Feature Documentary) in Toronto, Canada, and the Florida Film Festival.

Stephen Holden of The New York Times described the film as a "superbly balanced and organized documentary" and "a skillful assemblage of newsreel clips, cartoons ridiculing the American interlopers, television commercials and interviews with power officials and ordinary Georgians."

On review aggregator website Rotten Tomatoes, the film holds an approval rating of 94% based on 33 reviews, with an average rating of 7.4/10.
