= BLAST (telescope) =

Submillimeter telescope hung from a balloon

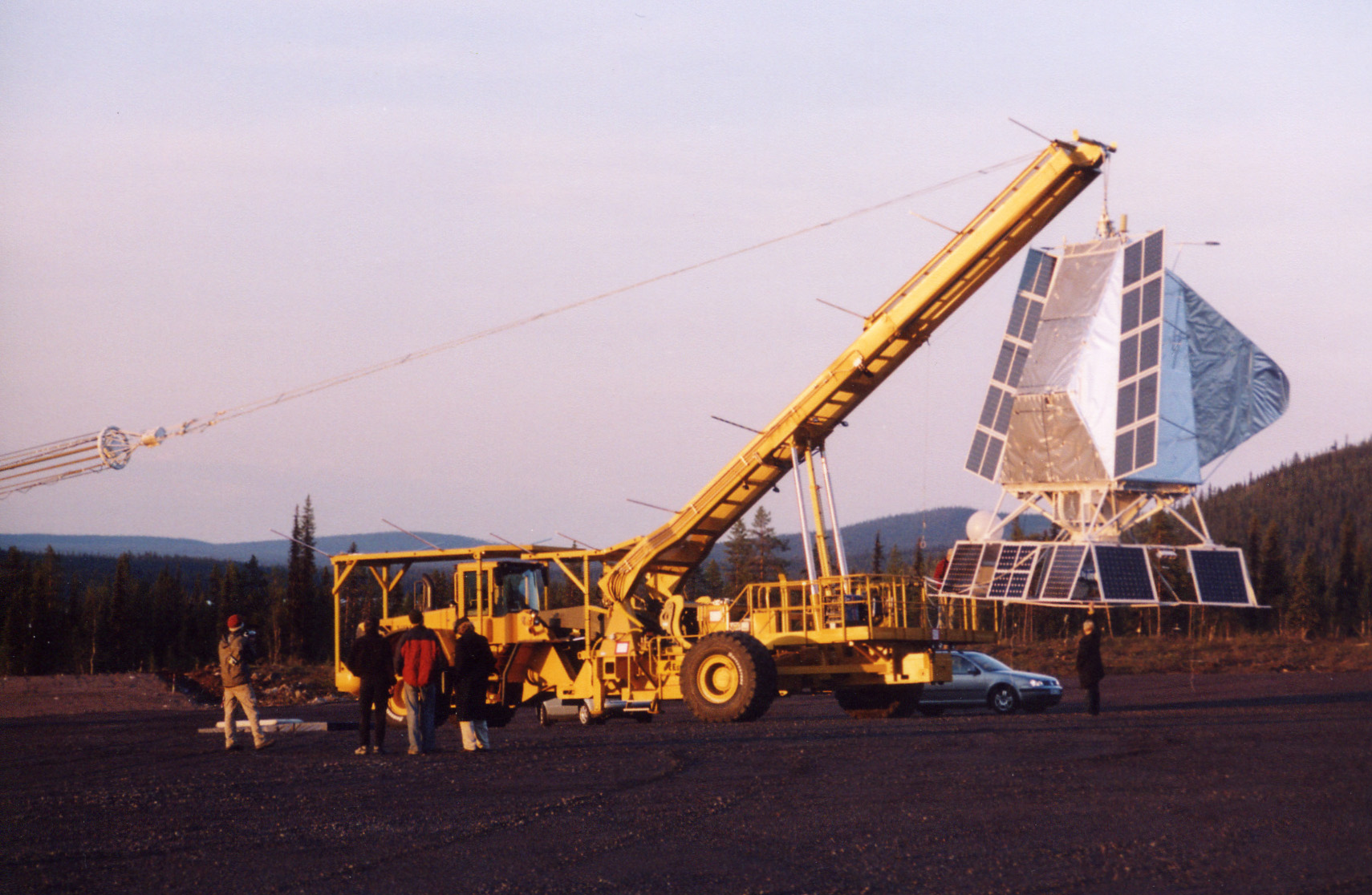
- BLAST hanging from the launch vehicle in Esrange near Kiruna, Sweden before launch in June 2005
- Alternative names: Balloon-borne Large Aperture Submillimeter Telescope
- Wavelength: 250, 350, 500 μm (1.20, 0.86, 0.60 THz)
- Diameter: 2 m (6 ft 7 in)
- Website: sites.northwestern.edu/blast/
- Related media on Commons

The Balloon-borne Large Aperture Submillimeter Telescope (BLAST) is a submillimeter telescope that hangs from a high-altitude balloon. It has a 2-meter primary mirror that directs light into bolometer arrays operating at 250, 350, and 500 μm. These arrays were developed for the SPIRE instrument on the Herschel Space Observatory. The project is carried out by a multi-university consortium headed by the University of Pennsylvania and which also includes University of Toronto, Brown University, the University of Miami, the University of British Columbia, JPL, INAOE, and Cardiff University. The third flight of BLAST in Antarctica was a scientific success, but much of telescope was destroyed after landing. It has been rebuilt for a flight from Antarctica in the 2010-11 austral summer. This most recent flight of BLAST (aka BLAST-Pol) has a polarimeter to observe the polarized light from star forming cores. The light is polarized due to magnetic fields. It is thought that the magnetic fields inhibit the collapse of the cores. The Herschel Space Observatory does not have a polarimeter.

BLAST's primary science goals are:

- Measure photometric redshifts, rest-frame FIR luminosities and star formation rates of high-redshift starburst galaxies, thereby constraining the evolutionary history of those galaxies that produce the FIR/submillimeter background.
- Measure cold pre-stellar sources associated with the earliest stages of star and planet formation.
- Make high-resolution maps of diffuse galactic emission over a wide range of galactic latitudes.

Filmmaker Paul Devlin made a documentary film titled BLAST! about the project. Paul is the brother of cosmologist Mark Devlin, principal investigator of the BLAST project.

== Flights ==
1. BLAST's first flight was an engineering (test) flight. BLAST launched at approximately 15:10 UTC September 28, 2003 from the Columbia Scientific Balloon Facility base in Fort Sumner, New Mexico, and landed approximately 26 hours later near Newcomb, New Mexico.
2. BLAST's second flight was its first scientific flight. BLAST launched at 1:10 UTC June 12, 2005 from Esrange, near Kiruna, Sweden and landed at 6:15 UTC June 16, 2005 on Victoria Island, Northwest Territories, Canada.
3. BLAST's third flight was its second scientific flight. BLAST launched at 1:54:10 UTC December 21, 2006 from McMurdo Station, Antarctica and landed at 1:05 UTC January 2, 2007 756 km southwest of McMurdo. The telescope's third landing was disastrous; the parachute failed to release itself from the gondola (upon landing) and the Antarctic winds dragged it along the surface of the ice for 24 hours, with it finally coming to rest in a crevasse 200 km from the landing site. The hard drives containing the data it had collected were eventually located and recovered from the drag path, but the telescope was mostly destroyed.
4. BLAST's fourth flight (the first as BLAST-Pol) launched at 4:06 UTC December 27, 2010 from Willy Field, McMurdo Station, Antarctica and landed on the Ross Ice Shelf.
