= Paul Devlin (filmmaker) =

American filmmaker

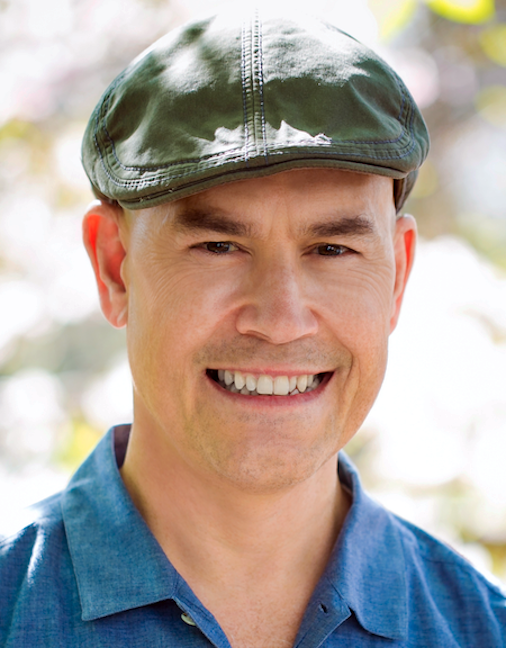
- Born: Paul Josiah Devlin; 1963 (age 62–63)
- Education: University of Michigan
- Occupations: Filmmaker, video editor
- Known for: SlamNation, Power Trip, BLAST!
- Spouse: Emily Raabe
- Relatives: Mark J. Devlin (brother)
- Awards: 9x Emmy Award winner; awards at Berlin International Film Festival, Hot Docs Canadian International Documentary Festival, Florida Film Festival

Paul Josiah Devlin is an American independent filmmaker. The films he has produced and directed, SlamNation, Power Trip, Freestyle – The Art of Rhyme, BLAST! and The Front Man have won over a dozen film festival awards, as well as an Independent Spirit Award nomination. Devlin is also a professional video editor, often working in sports broadcasting, a field in which he has won nine Emmy Awards.

== Early life and education ==
While attending high school in New Jersey, Devlin penned a now widely shared "I reject your rejection" letter to the admissions department at Harvard University. The letter was published twice in The New York Times, copied and re-purposed, as well as performed by prominent actors onstage through the London-based group Letters Live. Himesh Patel performed the letter at the Royal Albert Hall in October 2022.

While attending the University of Michigan, Devlin produced, directed and edited his first documentary Rockin' Brunswick starring Matt Pinfield; broadcast his first music video "You Don't Know Me" on MTV's Basement Tapes, hosted by Billy Crystal; participated in a screenwriting workshop led by Lawrence Kasdan; and worked as a production assistant on Robert Altman's Secret Honor, filmed in Ann Arbor. Devlin graduated with a BA in English and Language Literature.

== Career ==
=== Filmmaking ===
Devlin's professional career began in Hong Kong, at Take Two Film and Video, where he edited the movie Inside Hong Kong for the Hong Kong Tourist Association.

Devlin's first independent film was a scripted feature that he wrote, directed and produced called The Eyes of St. Anthony, starring James McAffrey.

He produced, directed and edited the television pilot Slammin - The Sport of Spoken Word, which documented a semi-final poetry slam at the Nuyorican Poets Café in New York City and was nominated for a New York Emmy Award for Outstanding Fine Art Programming.

This project led to Devlin's first feature-length documentary, SlamNation, which followed the Nuyorican Poet's Café's poetry slam team, as it competed in the 1996 National Poetry Slam in Portland, Oregon. Starring Saul Williams, the film made its film festival premiere at the SXSW Film Festival, won Best Documentary at the Northampton Film Festival, premiered theatrically at the Film Forum in New York City, was released theatrically across the U.S. by The Cinema Guild, and broadcast on HBO.

Devlin was the producing editor of Freestyle: The Art of Rhyme, which won best documentary at the Woodstock Film Festival and Florida Film Festival, was broadcast on VH1, and distributed by Palm Pictures.

Devlin produced, directed, and edited the feature documentary Power Trip. The film follows the acquisition of Telasi, the electricity distribution company of Tbilisi, Georgia, by an American utility, AES Corporation. The film premiered at the Berlin Film Festival, followed by an extensive film festival run winning 10 awards, and an Independent Spirit Award nomination for Best Documentary. Power Trip was distributed theatrically by Artistic License Films, premiering at Film Forum in New York City. Television sales through Film Transit International led to broadcasts in over 60 countries, including PBS's Independent Lens. Reviewing Power Trip, Variety wrote, "Made with deft evenhandedness, Paul Devlin's accomplished film plays almost like a fictional drama, containing suspense, comedy and some colorful characters.

Devlin's next feature documentary, BLAST!, was commissioned by the BBC’s Storyville and follows the challenges of launching a revolutionary telescope on a NASA high-altitude balloon in Antarctica. Devlin received an Individual Artist Grant from the New York State Council of the Arts (NYSCA) to support the film. BLAST! premiered at the Hot Docs Canadian International Documentary Festival in Toronto, opened a limited theatrical run at the IFC Center in New York City was featured on NPR’s Science Friday and The Colbert Report, and was broadcast internationally as a Special Project of the International Year of Astronomy.

Devlin's feature documentary The Front Man, follows the rock and roll band Loaded Poets over the course of 27 years. The film premiered at Cinequest Film Festival and screened at the IFC Center in New York as part of Raphaela Neihausen and Thom Powers documentary film series "Stranger than Fiction". The Front Man is distributed by The Orchard.

=== Sports broadcasting ===
Devlin's career in sports broadcasting began when he was hired locally in Seoul, Korea, by NBC Sports to work as a runner at the Games of the XXIV Olympiad.

Since then, his credits on major sports broadcasts have been extensive, including The NFL Today, NCAA March Madness, FIFA World Cup on ABC, the French Open and Tennis on CBS. Devlin has won three Sports Emmy Awards for his work on CBS Sports’ Tour de France coverage, two Emmys for his work on CBS Sports’ Super Bowl broadcasts and three Emmys for Olympics on NBC.

== Personal life ==
Devlin is married to Emily Raabe. He is the son of Thomas Joseph Devlin and Nancy Devlin. He has two brothers, Mark Joseph Devlin and Thomas Edward Devlin.

== Filmography ==
=== Film ===
Year	Title	Role
2022	Yankees-Dodgers: An Uncivil War	Editor
2019	A Beautiful Lie	Producer, Editor
2014	The Front Man	Director, Producer, Cinematographer, Editor
2008	BLAST!	Director, Producer, Editor, Camera Operator
2003	Power Trip	Director, Producer, Cinematographer, Editor
2000	Freestyle: The Art of Rhyme	Producer, Editor, Producing Editor
1998	SlamNation	Director, Producer, Editor
1984	Secret Honor	Production Assistant

=== Television ===
YEAR	TITLE	ROLE
1998–Present	The NFL Today	Editor
2023	Southern Hoops: A History of SEC Basketball	Editor
2022	Beijing 2022: XXIV Olympic Winter Games	Editor
2021	Tokyo 2020: Games of the XXXII Olympiad	Editor
2019-2020	The Athletic (3 episodes)	Editor
2016	Super Bowl 50	Editor
2013	Super Bowl XLVII	Editor
2008	Tour de France 2008	Producer
2007	Super Bowl XLI	Editor
2005	Independent Lens (1 episode)	Director, Producer
2004	Super Bowl XXXVIII	Editor
2003	Tour de France 2003	Editor
2001	Tour de France 2001	Producer
2001	Super Bowl XXXV	Editor
1998	Nagano 1998: XVIII Olympic Winter Games	Editor
1996	Atlanta 1996: Games of the XXVI Olympiad	Editor
1995	Slammin': The Sport of Spoken Word	Director, Producer
1992	Barcelona 1992: Games of the XXV Olympiad	Editor
