= Blast (Russian band) =

Russian indie band

Blast is a Moscow-based band formed in the late 1990s by Georgian singer/songwriter Nash Tavkhelidze.

He had previously spent a number of years in the US playing in different bands. In the States he met Georgian musician Gia Lashvili. They did a few successful shows together and realised that it was great collaboration. However, Nash had to return to Moscow because of family issues. While in Moscow, he decided to put the band together. Gia Lashvili also flew back and joined the band together with their old friend Alexandre Hlup Yarchevsky and the drummer Igor Meshkovsky . They decided to call the band Blast. The unit came out very productive and within two months, Nash, Gia and Khlap completed their album Pigs Can Fly which was produced by a producer from Manchester, Mark Tolle. At that time the Moscow club scene was booming and BLAST very quickly became the most popular indie band in the city. In 1998 band was picked up by the indie label "Apollo G Records" (Manchester, UK). They released their first album Pigs Can Fly and followed this with a UK club tour in 2000. In 2000, Gia and the drummer left the band. Two musicians from Bulgaria Vlado Kostov and Valio blagoev ( drums & bass) joined BLAST. A few years later the band signed to Ghost Records UK and hit the studio, recording the album F**K the industry with producer Graham Pilgrim.

== Cookies are Sweet ==
At that time, the Russian music industry paid little attention to russian bands singing in English, yet despite this in 2000 Russian MTV regularly rotated the video of the BLAST track "Cookies are Sweet", taken from their first album. Encouraged by this, BLAST undertook a tour of Russia.

== OPPI-KOPPI International Festival ==
In 2001 the band was invited to South Africa to participate in the OPPI-KOPPI International Festival in Pretoria, followed by a tour of South Africa. They were the first band from the ex- Soviet Union to take part in this international event. During this tour BLAST began recording their second album Bury The Shoe-Girl which was finished in 2002 and released by the London Label Ghost Records.

== 2003–2004 ==
The band spent most of 2003 and 2004 touring, playing festivals in Russia, Europe and the UK, and gigging in Moscow. In 2003 they were chosen by the UK band "Blur" to support them for one show in Moscow.

== F**k the Industry ==
In 2005 Blast released their third album, F**k the Industry. The album was recorded in South London by producer Graham Pilgrim through Ghost Records UK who signed the band after their spell with Apollo G. It was the band's second release with the London Label. Two songs from this album, "Alright" and "Get Off Your Trip", were successfully rotated on Russia's first alternative radio station "Radio Maximum".

== Misha Gallagher ==
After the release of F**k the Industry, Khlap left the band, and was replaced by Misha Gallagher on guitar. Also in 2005 Blast began presenting their own big rock'n'roll nights in Moscow called "BLAST Night". These are held in Moscow's most popular rock'n'roll club "Krizis Zhanra" which was founded by Blast and their friends.

== Blastfest ==
The success of this enterprise inspired the band to raise the level, and in 2008 they held a large international festival "Blastfest" in Moscow. Performers included indie bands from all over the USSR, and the headliners were "Supergrass" and Brett Anderson from the UK.

== Seva Stebletsov ==
In 2009, Seva Stebletsov joined the band on keyboards. They then released their fifth album "Strange Days Coming" on the Russian label Navigator Records.

== Overplay.com ==
In June 2010, The Blast became the No. 1 in UK internet indie charts "Overplay.com". They then released the 5-track EP "Papillon".

== Krisis of Genre ==
In August 2013, Blast Unit Moscow released "Rollercoaster Ride", the first single from their new album Krisis of Genre.
