= BLAST! (2008 film) =

- Poster by Dan Chapman
- Directed by: Paul Devlin
- Starring: Mark Devlin
- Distributed by: Docurama
- Release date: 2008
- Running time: 74 minutes
- Country: United States
- Language: English

BLAST! is a 2008 American feature-length documentary by Paul Devlin. The film follows a team of astrophysicists who launch a telescope, upon a high-altitude balloon from northern Sweden and again from Antarctica. The film follows the crew of scientists as they travel on a search to answer humankind's fundamental questions about the origins of the universe. The film avoids traditional narration and talking-head interviews, instead following events as they occur. The film focuses on the personal experiences of the scientists involved in the experiment.

== History ==
BLAST! premiered at Hot Docs on Tuesday, April 22, 2008. It has been screened at various film festivals, such as Sheffield Doc/Fest 2008, Guangzhou International Documentary Film Festival, and Arctic Light Film Festival.

BLAST! was co-produced by BBC 4's Storyville, Discovery Channel Canada, SVT Sweden, and YLE/FST Finland. The film was broadcast on Discovery Channel in February 2009, and later acquired by VPRO-Netherlands and DR2-Denmark.

== The BLAST experiment ==
BLAST, the Ballon-borne-Large-Aperture Submillimeter Telescope, was a 2-metre telescope flown from a high-altitude balloon to observe submillimeter radiation emitted mostly by dust heated by young stars. It was created to address important extragalactic and Galactic questions regarding the formation and evolution of stars, galaxies and clusters.

== International Year of Astronomy 2009 ==
As an official special project of the International Year of Astronomy 2009, BLAST!, screened in communities around the world throughout 2009. The International Year of Astronomy 2009 was a global initiative organized by the International Astronomical Union and UNESCO to promote public interest in astronomy. The International Year of Astronomy 2009 was endorsed by United Nations and International Council for Science (ICSU).

== Reception ==
Astrophysicist Neil deGrasse Tyson commented on the film by saying, "In a rare combination of content and storytelling, BLAST! treats the viewer not only to the fruits of cosmic discovery but to the fits and starts of dedicated scientists who navigate paths of research that enable it."

Tim Teeman from Times Entertainment said of the film "For those of us with bad memories of physics and chemistry class, it was inspirational and aspirational."

Simon Horsford of The Telegraph wrote that the film is "A story that, in trying to answer age-old questions about how we got here, produces an intriguing dynamic between the two main scientists."
