= Loaded Poets =

American rock band

- Also known as: The Deal
- Origin: North Brunswick, New Jersey
- Genres: Rock, rock and roll, blues rock, punk rock, new wave
- Years active: 1980–present
- Members: Jim Wood (vocals); Dan Snyder (keyboards); John Kayne (guitar); Mark Francione (bass); Eric Hoffer (drums)
- Website: www.loadedpoets.com

Loaded Poets is an American rock band, formed in North Brunswick, New Jersey in January 1980, by Jim Wood (vocals), Dan Snyder (keyboards), John Kayne (guitar), Mark Francione (bass), and Eric Hoffer (drums). The band has played together for over 30 years. The band is the subject of the upcoming documentary film 'The Front Man' by filmmaker Paul Devlin.

== History ==
=== Early years ===
Formed while the bandmates were in high school, Loaded Poets initially went by the name The Deal, with influences coming from punk and new wave. Early gigs featured an all-cover line-up before the band began performing original compositions. The band continued to hone their originals, and as college ensued, rhythm section line-ups came and went as Wood, Snyder, and Kayne stayed put. The band began playing clubs in New Jersey (most notably New Brunswick's Court Tavern), New York, and Philadelphia, and appeared in filmmaker Paul Devlin's first documentary, Rockin’ Brunswick (1983), which documented the New Brunswick, New Jersey music scene of the 1980s. The video on Vimeo clearly shows the year, 1983.

=== 1990-2001 ===
The band soon changed their name to Loaded Poets, and released a collection of new and previous studio recordings entitled Seeing Things in 1999, which was manufactured through Disc Makers. The band performed a CD release gig at The Court Tavern. Gigs at Kenny's Castaways in New York and Maxwell's in Hoboken followed, during which the band shaped new material for their next CD. On December 6, 2001, the wife of a band member appeared on the Howard Stern show in an effort to get the band's music played on the air. She competed against another woman in a contest of who could kiss Wack Pack member Beetlejuice the best. The other woman won, but Stern announced the band's name as a consolation prize.

=== 2002-present day ===
Despite Wood's marriage and child, Snyder's marriage and children, and Kayne's marriage, the band continued to write, record, and perform new material. Over a period of seven years they wrote, recorded and mixed their second CD, Super Star Dumb.

In 2002 Paul Devlin, filmmaker and lifelong friend of the band members, began filming Wood for a documentary project. As the band approached its 30-year anniversary, Devlin entitled the film The Front Man. Present goals are to release the film in 2014.

== Discography ==
- Seeing Things (1999)

Track listing

1. "Giant"
2. "Nancy in America"
3. "Party Girl"
4. "Dear Jenny"
5. "Crawlin' Home"
6. "Breakdown"
7. "Oh Brother"
8. "Dream Out Loud"
9. "My Ford"
10. "Experience Void"

== Influences ==
- Sex Pistols
- Elvis Costello
- Ramones
- Joe Jackson
- B-52s
