= Janae Johnson =

African American poet and DJ

Janae Johnson is a writer, cultural worker, and DJ from Sacramento, California.

She is the co-founder of poetry venues, The House Slam in Boston, and The Root Slam in the Bay Area.

== Poetry career ==
Johnson started her slam career at the Cantab, and the Lizard Lounge, in Cambridge, Massachusetts. She has won grand slams at both venues.

Johnson has coached the Simmons College Poetry Slam team and the UC Berkeley poetry team for the College Unions Poetry Slam Invitational.

In 2015, Johnson won the Women of the World Poetry Slam, in Albuquerque, New Mexico, over 71 other poets.

In 2017, at TEDxLSU Chain Reaction, Terisa Siagatonu and Johnson delivered a poetry recital about nuclear weapons and climate change.

In 2022, Write Bloody published Johnson’s first book, Lessons on Being TenderHeaded.

=== Creation of new venues ===
Johnson values artistic spaces that prioritize regions’ lifelong residents, especially residents of color. She has stated, “It's very important to us to be connected to the neighborhood.”

==== The House Slam ====
In an effort to create a free poetry space that celebrated Black poets, Johnson co-founded The House Slam with Porsha Olayiwola in 2014 at the Haley House Bakery Café in Roxbury.

Johnson and Olayiwola were given permission to host poetry slams at the café on a two-night trial basis. When the venue’s owners observed there was so much interest that they had to turn people away at the door, they agreed to let Johnson and Olayiwola permanently host The House Slam at the Haley House.

In 2015, Johnson competed with The House Slam at the National Poetry Slam in Oakland. House Slam placed first over 71 teams, making them champions in their first year. House Slam was the first Boston poetry slam team to compete at NPS and the first Boston poetry slam team to win nationals. House Slam also became “the first venue in history to simultaneously hold the country’s three major slam titles,” according to the event's host, Poetry Slam Inc.

==== The Root Slam ====
In 2016, Johnson co-founded The Root Slam with Terisa Siagatonu, Natasha Huey, Isa Borgeson, Gabriel Cortez, and Jade Cho. In its first year, Root Slam sent an all-women-of-color team to the 2017 National Poetry Slam, and placed fifth in the nation out of 80 teams.

== Music career ==
Johnson is the disc jockey, DJ Summer Soft. Her DJ name is derived from the Stevie Wonder song, "Summer Soft". Johnson grew up listening to Wonder and has featured him in her poems. Johnson has DJ’ed for Pride on Capitol Hill with KEXP, at SoDo nightclub for Sapphic Seattle, and on New Year's Eve in Downtown Tacoma.

== Written work ==
=== Books ===
- Lessons on Being TenderHeaded, Write Bloody Publishing, 2022

=== Poems ===
- "Nash Say", Write About Now, 2021
- “Stevie”, Button Poetry, 2021
- "Fragments", Write About Now, 2020
- "Hold Me (After Ernest Gibson III)", Write About Now, 2020
- "Archie aka Ode to my Father", Button Poetry, 2019
- "On Emotional Labor", Button Poetry, 2018
- "Personal Protest (after Robbie Dunning)", Women of the World Poetry Slam, 2017
- "Ode to My Ripped Pants", Individual World Poetry Slam, 2017
- "What we are made of -- an ode to women's basketball", ESPN, 2016
- "Black Rage", Button Poetry, 2016
- "An Unapologetic Celebration of the Self. Villanelle after Kendrick Lamar", National Poetry Slam, 2015
- "Black Butch Woman", House Slam, 2015
- "My Court", Da Poetry Lounge, 2015
- "Black Girl Magic", SlamFind, 2015
- "Grinding", National Poetry Slam, 2015
- "Volume 1", Kinfolks: a journal of black expression, 2015
- "And here’s why I didn’t fuck with love & basketball when it came out in theaters", FreezeRay, 2013
