= Imani Cezanne =

American poet

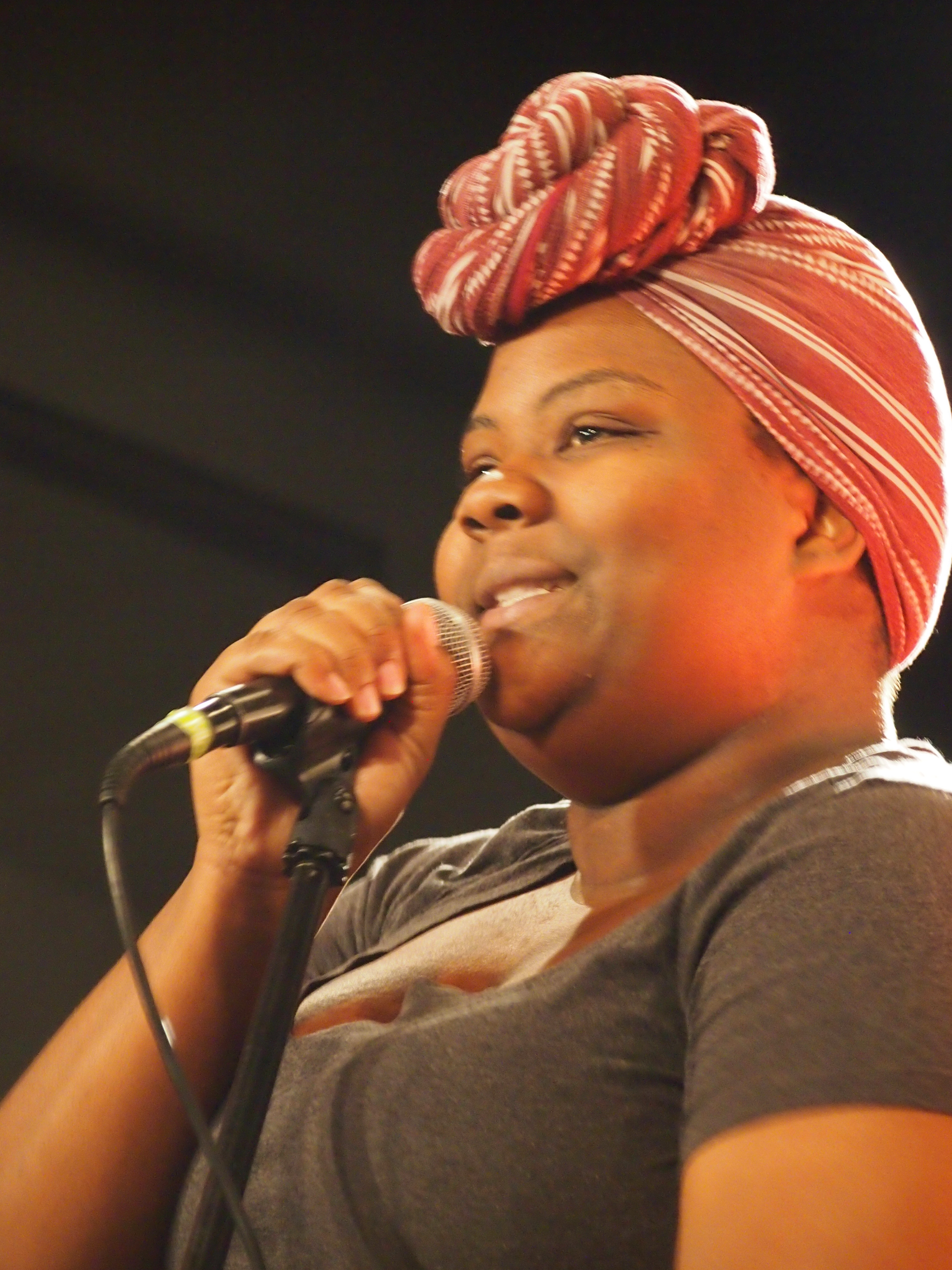
- Born: San Diego, California
- Occupation: Poet

Imani Cezanne is an American activist and spoken word poet. She is the founding president of President of S.P.E.A.K. (Spoken Poetry Expressed by All Kinds).

== Biography ==
Cezanne was born and raised in San Diego, California.

Cezanne has been on multiple National Poetry Slam teams including: Da Poetry Lounge, San Diego Slam Team, Oakland Slam Team Elevated, Golden State Slam, The Root Slam, Berkeley Poetry Slam, and Busboys and Poets Beltway

She represented the Root Slam at the 2018 National Poetry Slam.

=== "Heels" ===
"Heels" was originally filmed by All Def Poetry during her performance of the piece at the Da Poetry Lounge. Later, Cezanne performed the piece again at the Ill List Slam Poetry Invitational in December 2014.

=== "Protest" ===
Cezanne performed "Protest" at the 2015 National Poetry Slam.

=== "Angry Black Woman" ===
Cezanne performed "Angry Black Woman" at the Da Poetry Lounge in 2015.

=== "Hunger Games" ===
Originally performed at the 2014 Women of the World Poetry Slam in Austin, Texas. It was filmed by Button Poetry and uploaded to YouTube.

=== "#flyingwhileblack" ===
Filmed at Women of the World Poetry Slam Finals 2016 in Brooklyn, NY, an event hosted by Poetry Slam, Inc.

== Awards ==
Imani Cezanne has won several Grand Slam Championships, and ranked in the top 10 at several World Poetry slams.

- 2014 Individual World Poetry Slam ranked 9th
- 2016 Women of the World Poetry Slam 2016 Co-champions with Emi Mahmoud
- 2020 Women of the World Poetry Slam Champion
- 2020 Finalist for the Ruth Lilly and Dorothy Sargent Rosenberg Fellowship
- 2020 Fugue Writing Contest Poetry Winner
