= Sister Outsider Poetry =

Slam poetry duo

Sister Outsider is a poetry duo that specializes in slam poetry or spoken word. Dominique Christina and Denice Frohman are both Women of the World Poetry Slam Champions. Their collaboration has brought them success over the last two years as they have been to over 90 universities, colleges, conferences, and many other spaces across the United States. Inspired by the life of Audre Lorde, their premise is to encourage students and people across all generations to understand the power of art. They believe art can be a form of activism and expression that goes well beyond the page. Aside from their vivid performances, Sister Outsider also offers workshops to help students with their poetry writing as well as the delivery aspect to slam poetry.

== Poetry ==
Christina and Frohman specialize in poetry about injustice amongst marginalized communities, people of color, and LGBTQ communities. Through poetry they break the silence and use it as a tool for social change on poverty issues and stereotypes amongst these communities. They stand against such margins of violent and unhealthy culture by going by the slogan, "We Exist. We Resist." Their use of spoken word and personal stories spark conversation and encourage discussion on political and social issues. Their ability to incorporate activism with writing is what makes this duo inspiring.
