= College Unions Poetry Slam Invitational =

Annual poetry slam tournament

The College Union Poetry Slam Invitational (CUPSI) is an annual Poetry Slam tournament put on by the Association of College Unions International (ACUI) in which teams of four or five college students from different colleges and universities compete against each other. Its location changes every year.

The competitive element is not the primary focus of the event; it is an opportunity for student poets to showcase their art and to develop their writing and presentation skills so as to take advantage of future opportunities in poetry. The event is inclusive, and all students are welcome.

== History ==
The first CUPSI tournament was organized in 2001 by Robb Thibault. It was held at University of Michigan-Ann Arbor. Seven teams competed in the first tournament. The number of teams participating in CUPSI has grown since then with 53 teams competing in 2014. The 2016 competition will take place at the University of Texas at Austin on April 6–9.

The increase in attendance coincides with the growth of slam poetry itself. Poets such as Individual World Poetry Slam champion Rudy Francisco have noted a general trend in the prevalence of poetry slam in everyday life.

Several videos of poems performed at CUPSI having gone viral on the internet, including Lily Myers's poem "Shrinking Women", which was viewed by over three million people within a year of its posting, and Patrick Roche's "21," which gained over three million views in its first two weeks after publishing. Poems from CUPSI have been featured on several popular political blogs and news sites, including The Huffington Post, Upworthy, and Jezebel. Many of these videos were filmed and published by Button Poetry.

== Format ==
Teams compete against each other in bouts consisting of four rounds of poetry in which each team sends one poem. The first two days of the tournament are preliminary bouts, and the rankings from these determine which teams advance onto semi-finals. The scores in semi-finals determine who makes Final Stage. Judges are chosen at random from the audience.

== CUPSI Poetry Slam Winners By Year ==
| Year | Winner | Number of Teams | Host School |
|---|---|---|---|
| 2019 | Pennsylvania State University | 58 | University of Houston |
| 2018 | New York University | 65 | Temple University |
| 2017 | Pennsylvania State University, Montclair State University, Temple University, & New York University (Shared Title) | 72 | University of Illinois-Chicago |
| 2016 | Temple University | 67 | University of Texas-Austin |
| 2015 | New York University | 68 | Virginia Commonwealth University |
| 2014 | University of Texas-Austin | 53 | University of Colorado-Boulder |
| 2013 | New York University | 59 | Barnard College |
| 2012 | New York University | 48 | University of La Verne |
| 2011 | Macalester College | 37 | University of Michigan |
| 2010 | University of Wisconsin-Madison | 35 | Emerson College |
| 2009 | University of Pennsylvania | 32 | University of Pennsylvania |
| 2008 | University of New Mexico | 22 | University of New Mexico |
| 2007 | University of Pennsylvania | 18 | Eastern Michigan University |
| 2006 | University of New Mexico | 22 | Texas State University-San Marco |
| 2005 | University of California-Santa Cruz | 20 | West Chester University |
| 2004 | University of California-Berkeley | 20 | University of California-Berkeley |
| 2003 | University of Arkansas | 8 | University of Arkansas |
| 2002 | University of Michigan-Ann Arbor | 10 | Case Western Reserve University |
| 2001 | University of California-Berkeley | 7 | University of Michigan-Ann Arbor |

== See also ==
- Individual World Poetry Slam
- List of performance poets
- National Poetry Slam
- Women of the World Poetry Slam
- Oral poetry
- Performance poetry
- Poetry Slam
- Poetry Slam, Inc.
- Spoken word
