= Button Poetry =

American poetry publisher

- Founded: 2011; 14 years ago
- Founder: Sam Van Cook
- Country of origin: USA
- Headquarters location: Minneapolis, Minnesota
- Distribution: SCB Distributors
- Fiction genres: Poetry
- Imprints: Exploding Pinecone Press
- Owner(s): Sam Van Cook
- No. of employees: 8
- Official website: buttonpoetry.com

Button Poetry is a Minneapolis-based poetry company and independent publisher of performance poetry. They are known for their viral videos of slam poetry performances, including a performance of "OCD" by Neil Hilborn that the Knight Foundation called "the most-viewed slam performance in history."

== History ==
Button Poetry was founded in 2011 by Sam Van Cook to promote performance poetry through video and social media. As of 2018 they had over 774,000 YouTube subscribers and over 1.2M Facebook followers. In 2013 they began publishing books.

Button Poetry has recorded performances by Brittney Black Rose Kapri, Chrysanthemum Tran, Elliot Darrow, Crystal Valentine, Neil Hilborn, Denice Frohman, Rudy Francisco, Danez Smith, Melissa Lozada-Oliva, Emi Mahmoud, Aja Monet, Imani Cezanne, Janae Johnson, Javon Johnson, Desireé Dallagiacomo, Yesika Salgado, Andrea Gibson, Rudy Francisco, Sabrina Benaim, Porsha Olayiwola, Tonya Ingram, Muggs Fogarty, Siaara Freeman, and Hanif Abdurraqib.

== Criticism ==
Button Poetry has received backlash from critics who suggest that the works make "a mockery of the whole canon." Viral poets have been labeled "Instapoets" due to their specific style and creation for a more broad audience and their placement in visual/social media platforms. Poets and linguists have criticized the effects of viral poetry on poetry writing, noting potential homogenization of writing styles among newer poets.

== CUPSI 2017 ==
In 2017, a camera crew from Button Poetry attended College Unions Poetry Slam Invitational to document the festival, as they had done for many years.

Alleged "founder of slam poetry", Marc Smith, who was a featured performer on final stage that year, upset much of the audience with his set, which led to protests and changes in the scheduled programming of events. For an hour and a half, a discussion from finalists and organizers occurred backstage as to how to proceed.

When the finalists reconvened, they brought a list of demands on stage, one of which was, "none of the poems that touch this stage tonight will be recorded by Button Poetry. You will not capitalize off of us… we won’t have it, not tonight. We will not be demoralized, nor will our traumas be trivialized for revenue, especially not by an organization that cannot simply provide us with a safe space.” Finishing off the statement poet Justice Ameer stated, "when we say 'remember why you wrote it, it's not to help white people make money."

On April 18, 2017, Button Poetry released the following statement, "We recognize our role in relation to the poetry community and have been listening to your concerns. We are working towards better transparency around curation of video and compensation of poets. First, we feel it is important to communicate that NO POEM goes up on Button social media without a signed release. Second, it is one of our core goals to compensate poets for their work; we do this in many fashions including paying features and top-placing poets at Button Poetry Live, paying royalties to authors, paying royalties on videos (after an earning threshold), primarily employing poets as videographers, video editors, social media managers, shipping staff, curators and so on. We are eager to improve and are working on documentation of our processes in an effort to be more transparent. We will be making those documents available in the coming weeks and months."

== YCA Statement ==
In 2021, Button Poetry President & Founder Sam Van Cook released a statement sharing his concerns about Young Chicago Authors (YCA) and their involvement in enabling serial rapists and abusers. “I believe that Kevin Coval’s leadership at YCA is a clear and present danger to the thousands of young people served through YCA and [its slam poetry tournament] Louder Than a Bomb (LTAB),” Van Cook wrote. In his statement, Van Cook also commented on Roger Bonair-Agard and stated, "I believe [him] to be a serial predator and rapist." The next day, the YCA board of directors put out a public statement declaring Coval's employment had been ended.
