= Individual World Poetry Slam =

Annual international poetry Slam competition

The Individual World Poetry Slam (iWPS) is a yearly poetry slam tournament put on by Poetry Slam, Inc. that pits individual slam poets from around the world against one another.

== History ==
From 1990 to 2007, the National Poetry Slam held an "individual" poetry competition (known as "indies") simultaneously with the team competition, with the poets earning the highest ranking individual poems during the first two days of competition moving on the semifinal and final rounds. The first ever winner of this event was Patricia Smith, who would go on to win the Individual National Poetry Slam Championship title four times, a record she shares with Ed Mabrey.

Starting in 2004, Poetry Slam Inc (PSI) decided to host a separate event called the Individual World Poetry Slam (iWPS), in which solo poets (not teams of poets) competed for the championship title. The first iWPS was held in Greenville, South Carolina (SC) under the direction of Kimberly J. Simms and the first iWPS champion was Buddy Wakefield.

Because of the popularity of iWPS and to avoid the confusion of two "individual" poetry slam titles being awarded ever year, Poetry Slam Inc. decided to cancel the "indie" competition at the National Poetry Slam.

In 2016, the competition was held in Flagstaff, Arizona. In 2017, it was held in Spokane, Washington (WA) and in 2018-2019 it was held in San Diego, California (CA). When PSI dissolved, the name was taken by the Dallas Poetry Slam who planned to organize the event in 2020. After being derailed for years by the pandemic, iWPS is rumored to return in 2023 under new leadership.

== Format ==
The tournament has two days of preliminary rounds, in which poets compete in 1, 2, 3, and 4 minute bouts. After these 4 bouts are completed, the poet's rankings in each bout are added up and the top 12 poets of the tournament are invited to compete in the final round. A 3 minute time limit is applied to the poems in the final round.

== Tournament results by year ==
Year	Winner	Runners up	Number of Competitors	Host city
2019	Jay Ward, Akeem Olaj, Breeze (Tie)	(4) Meccamorphosis (5) Anita D (6) TIE - Xach Blunt & RJ Wright (8) TIE - Yaw Kyeremateng & Doctor TJ (10) Hakeem Furious (11) Cocoa Flo (12) TIE - Kimberly Arrington & Bluz (14) Jael Benjamin	74	San Diego, CA
2018	Mic Ting	(2) Natasha Hooper (3) Koi aka Coy (4) David G (5) Wayne Henry (6) Jay Ward (7) Yaw Kyeremateng (8) Curtis Davis (9) Melania Luisa (10) TIE - Shasparay Lighteard & Breeze (12) Rio Chanae (13) Ryan J	84	San Diego, CA
2017	Arvind Nandakumar	(2) Anthony McPherson (3) Kenneth Something (4) Rudy Francisco (5) Kofi Dadzie (6) RJ Walker (7) Damien McClendon (8) Asia Bryant-Wilkerson (9) Christopher Michael (10) Steven Willis (11) Yaw Kyeremateng (12) Michael Harriot (13) Jahman Hill (14) Ed Mabrey	90	Spokane, WA
2016	Ed Mabrey	(2) Rage Almighty (3) Patrick Roche (4) Joaquin Zihuatanejo (5) Ebo Barton (6) Akeem Olaj (7) Johnny Osi (8) FreeQuency (9) Jozer (10) TIE - Toaster & Ashlee Haze (12) Emtithal Mahmoud (13) Christopher Michael (14) Steven Willis	96	Flagstaff, AZ
2015	Emtithal Mahmoud	(2) Rasheed Copeland (3) TIE - FreeQuency & Christopher Michael (5) TIE - Rudy Francisco & Imani Cezanne (7) TIE - Porsha O & Javon Johnson (9) TIE- Crystal Valentine & TaneshaNicole (10) Steven Willis (11) Paul Tran (12) D.E.E.P.	96	Washington, DC
2014	Porsha O	(2) Danez Smith (3) Desireé Dallagiacomo (4) Hanif Abdurraqib (5) Will Evans (6) TIE - Damien Flores & Hieu Nguyen (8) Ed Mabrey (9) Joaquin Zihuatanejo (10) Twain (11) Imani Cezanne (12) Leo Bryant	72	Phoenix, AZ
2013	Ed Mabrey & Chancelier "Xero" Skidmore (Tie)	(3) Aaron Samuels (4) Jozer (5) Rudy Francisco (6) Dominique Ashaheed (7) Carrie Rudzinski (8) Joaquin Zihuatanejo (9) TIE - Outspoken Bean & Denice Frohman (11) Doc Luben (12) Antwaun "Twain" Davis	70	Spokane, WA
2012	Ed Mabrey	(2) Thuli Zuma (3) Melissa May (4) Seth Walker (5) Clint Smith (6) 6 is 9 (7) Franny Choi (8) Brian "Omni" Dillon (9) TIE - Lauren Zuniga & George "G" Yamazawa, Jr. (11) Cameron Awkward-Rich (12) Lisa Slater	67	Fayetteville, AR
2011	Chris August	(2) Jesse Parent (3) Kait Rokowski (4) TIE - Tatyana Brown & Brian "Omni" Dillon (6) Danez Smith (7) Alvin Lau (8) Ed Mabrey (9) Michael Lee (10) TIE - Suzi Q Smith & Joanna Hoffman (12) Storm Thomas (13) Robyn Bateman *There were 13 finalists instead of 12 due to a tie at the 12th qualifying rank	78	Cleveland, OH
2010	Rudy Francisco	(2) Jesse Parent (3) Chancelier "Xero" Skidmore (4) C. P. Maze (5) George "G" Yamazawa, Jr. (6) Thomas "Tre G" Gilbert (7) Tara Hardy (8) Alvin Lau (9) Gary Johnson (10) Zak "Kane" Corsi (11) Sasha Langford (12) Houston Hughes	72	Charlotte, NC
2009	Amy Everhart	(2) Iyeoka Ivie Okoawo (3) Rudy Francisco (4) 6 is 9 (5) Theo Wilson (6) The Original Woman (7) Tara Hardy (8) Ed Mabrey (9) Sierra DeMulder (10) Kim Johnson (11) William Evans (12) Alvin Lau	96	Berkeley, CA
2008	Joaquin Zihuatanejo	(2) Jason McBeth (3) 6 is 9 (4) Buddy Wakefield (5) Joshua Bennet (6) Andrew Tyree (7) Lizz Straight (8) Tara Hardy (9) Colin Gilbert (10) Bobby LeFebre (11) Queen Sheba (12) The Original Woman	70	Charlotte, NC
2007	Ed Mabrey	(2) Anis Mojgani (3) Andrea Gibson (4) Jamie DeWolf (5) Dan Leaman (6) Sonya Renee (7) Jared Paul (8) Ryler Dustin (9) Nicole Homer (10) Buddy Wakefield (11) J. W. "Baz" Basilo (12) Da'shade Moonbeam	72	Vancouver, BC
2006	Mighty Mike McGee	(2) Joaquin Zihuatenejo (3) Andrea Gibson (4) Jared Paul (5) Da Minista (6) Versiz (7) Sonya Renee (8) Stephanie Williams (9) Krissi Reeves (10) Rachel McKibbens (11) Basik Knowledge (12) Q	71	Charlotte, NC
2005	Buddy Wakefield	(2) Versiz (3) Maze Forever (4) Roger Bonair-Agard (5) Joaquin Zihuatanejo (6) Black Butta Fly (Mekkah) (7) Chris August (8) Bluz (9) Future (10) Da Minista (11) MAD (12) Ansel Appleton	60	Worcester, MA
2004	Buddy Wakefield	(2) TIE - Celena Glenn & Ed Mabrey (4) Rachel McKibbens (5) Paradox (6) Alvin Lau (7) ? (8) Marcell Murphy (9) Beth Bullmer (Other finalists: Ali Langston, Thee Black Falcon, Jonathan Brown, Xodus)	60	Greenville, SC

== See also ==
- List of performance poets
- National Poetry Slam
- Oral poetry
- Performance poetry
- Poetry Slam
- Poetry Slam, Inc.
- Spoken word
- Women of the World Poetry Slam
