= Andrea Gibson =

American poet and activist (1975–2025)

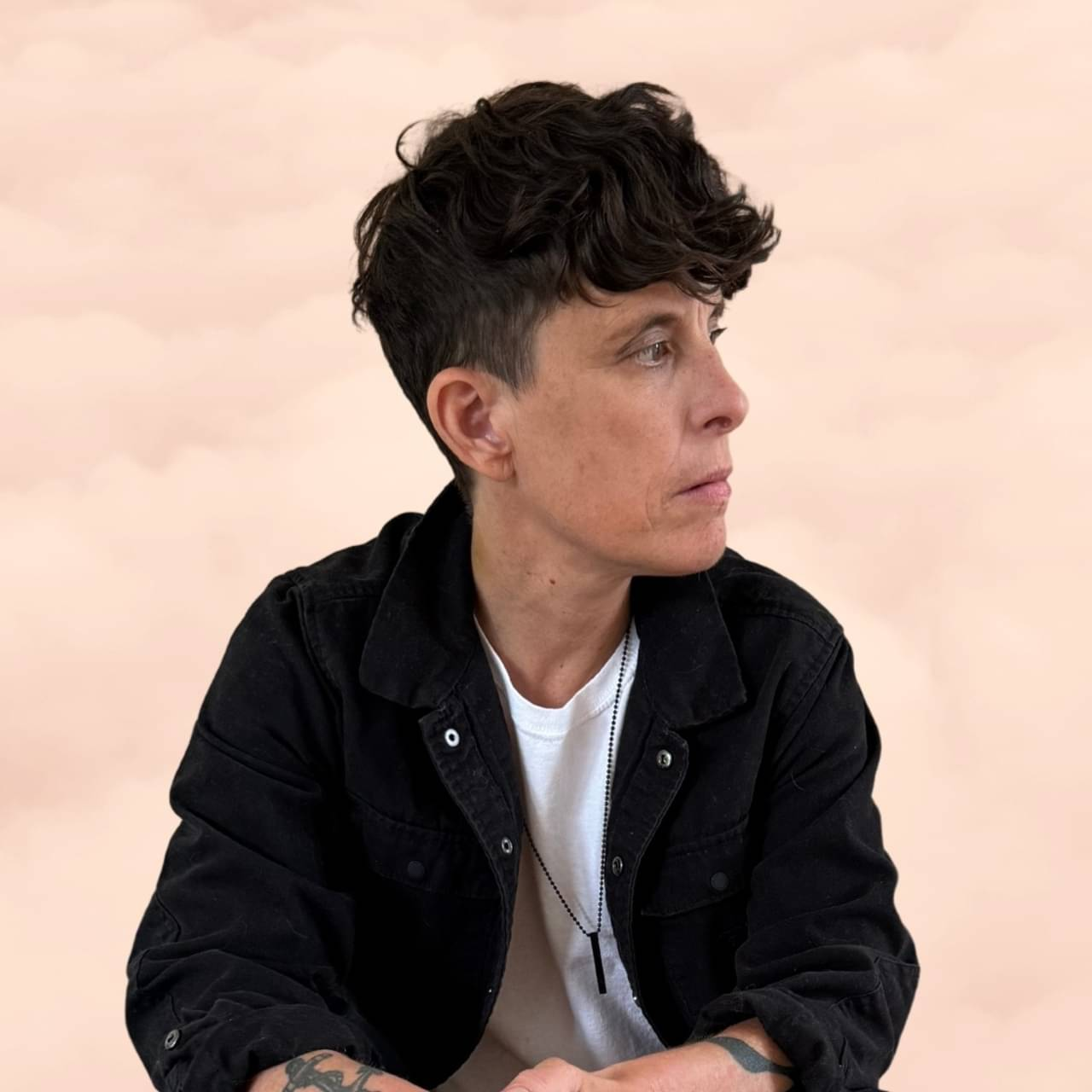
- Gibson in 2024
- Born: Andrea Faye Gibson; August 13, 1975; Calais, Maine, U.S.
- Died: July 14, 2025 (aged 49); Longmont, Colorado, U.S.
- Education: Saint Joseph's College of Maine
- Known for: Spoken word poetry; activism
- Notable work: You Better Be Lightning; Lord of the Butterflies; Take Me with You; Hey Galaxy
- Spouse: Megan Falley
- Awards: Denver Grand Slam Champion (4×); Women of the World Poetry Slam champion (2008)
- Honors: Poet Laureate of Colorado
- Website: andreagibson.org

Andrea Faye Gibson (August 13, 1975 – July 14, 2025) was an American poet and activist. Their (Note: Gibson used they/them pronouns.) poetry focused on gender norms, politics, social justice, LGBTQ topics, life, and mortality. Gibson was appointed as the Poet Laureate of Colorado in 2023.

== Early life and education ==
Andrea Faye Gibson was born on August 13, 1975, in Calais, Maine, where they grew up. Their father, Mark, worked for the post office and their mother, Shirley, was a secretary at a technical college. They have one sister, Laura. Gibson's parents were observant Baptists, and Gibson's upbringing was strictly religious and socially conservative.

Gibson attended Saint Joseph's College of Maine, a Catholic private school in Standish, Maine. Gibson attended on a basketball scholarship, and graduated in 1997 with an English degree.

Gibson lived for a time with a girlfriend in New Orleans, and the two moved in 1999 to Boulder, Colorado. Gibson went to their first open mic event at the Mercury Cafe in Denver, where they were inspired to become a spoken word artist. In 2005, Gibson left their job as a Montessori teacher and became a full-time poet.

== Poetry ==
Gibson's poetry focuses on gender norms, politics, social justice, and LGBTQ topics. After their cancer diagnosis, Gibson also began writing poetry on topics including depression, illness, life, and mortality. Gibson helped to drive a resurgence in the popularity of spoken word poetry in the mid-2000s.

In 2008, Gibson published their first book of poetry, Pole Dancing To Gospel Hymns. This was followed by The Madness Vase and Pansy, all published by Write Bloody Publishing. Gibson also wrote and published Take Me with You and Lord of the Butterflies in 2018.

Gibson's album Yellowbird incorporated music with spoken word. Confronting fear was a theme in poems of their following album, Flower Boy. Gibson also released Truce in 2013, followed by Hey, Galaxy in 2018. In total, Gibson wrote seven poetry books and published seven albums.

Gibson cited Sonya Renee Taylor, Derrick Brown, Anis Mojgani, Patricia Smith, and Mary Oliver as their influences. Gibson toured heavily, despite suffering from stage fright. They often performed poems at Button Poetry.

== Activism ==
In addition to using poetry to provide social and political commentary on gender and LGBTQ issues, Gibson was involved with many activist groups, and also performed at Take Back the Night events. For about a decade, Gibson performed with Vox Feminista, a "performance tribe of radical feminists bent on social change through cultural revolution."

In 2019, Gibson collaborated with producer Sarah Megyesy and musician Ani DiFranco to produce a video for the poem "America, Reloading", which discusses gun violence in the United States. "It's my hope that it will inspire direct action, conscious organizing, and more informed discussions between people with varying opinions about the most compassionate way forward," Gibson said.

Gibson worked with the national Power to the Patients movement to pressure hospitals to publish prices online.

== Awards and honors ==
Gibson was a four-time Denver Grand Slam Champion. They placed fourth in the 2004 National Poetry Slam and third in the 2006 and 2007 Individual World Poetry Slam. Gibson was the first person to win the Women of the World Poetry Slam in 2008. Gibson won the Independent Publisher Book Awards twice, in 2019 and 2021. They were a Goodreads Choice Awards finalist three times.

In September 2023, Gibson was appointed Poet Laureate of Colorado by Governor Jared Polis.

== Personal life ==
=== Marriage and relationships ===
After seven years of dating, Gibson and fellow poet Megan Falley announced their engagement in August 2022, and later married.

=== Gender identity ===
Gibson was genderqueer and used the pronouns they/them/theirs. Many of their poems are about gender identity, such as "Swing Set" and "Andrew". Gibson said, regarding gender: "I don't necessarily identify within a gender binary. I've never in my life really felt like a woman and I've certainly never felt like a man. I look at gender on a spectrum and I feel somewhere on that spectrum that's not landing on either side of that."

Regarding appellation, Gibson expressed affinity for a variety of names, stating: "The names my loved ones call me that I love being called: Andrea. Andrew. Andy. Anderson. Dre. Gibby. Gib. Gibbs. Gibba. Sam. Faye. Pangee."

=== Illness and death ===
In 2016, Gibson stated they had had chronic Lyme disease since at least 2010, and spoke about their experience with physical suffering and difficulty accessing care and treatment.

Gibson was diagnosed with ovarian cancer in August 2021. On August 2, 2022, they canceled a scheduled tour due to a recurrence of the cancer. They announced a further recurrence in May 2023 on the We Can Do Hard Things podcast with Glennon Doyle.

Gibson and their wife are the subjects of the documentary Come See Me in the Good Light, which documented their marriage and how they dealt with Gibson's terminal cancer diagnosis. Directed by Ryan White and produced by Tig Notaro, the film won the Festival Film Favorite Award at the 2025 Sundance Film Festival. Gibson co-wrote a song titled "Salt Then Sour Then Sweet" for the documentary, with executive producers Sara Bareilles and Brandi Carlile.

Gibson died of ovarian cancer on July 14, 2025, aged 49, at their home in Longmont, Colorado.

== Works ==
=== Discography ===
- Bullets and Windchimes (2003)
- Swarm (2004)
- When the Bough Breaks (2006)
- Yellowbird (2009)
- Flower Boy (2011)
- Truce (2013)
- Hey Galaxy (2018)

=== Books ===
- Pole Dancing to Gospel Hymns (2008, Write Bloody Publishing; ISBN 978-1-935904-89-2)
- The Madness Vase (2012, Write Bloody Publishing; ISBN 978-1-935904-38-0)
- Pansy (2015, Write Bloody Publishing; ISBN 978-1-938912-98-6)
- Take Me with You (2018, Plume; ISBN 978-0-7352-1951-9)
- Lord of the Butterflies (2018, Button Poetry; ISBN 978-1-943735-42-6)
- How Poetry Can Change Your Heart (with Megan Falley, 2019, Chronicle Books; ISBN 978-1-4521-7180-7)
- You Better Be Lightning (2021, Button Poetry; ISBN 978-1-943735-99-0)
