= Mwende Katwiwa =

Kenyan-American slam poet and activist

Mwende Katwiwa, who performs under the name FreeQuency, is a Kenyan-American slam poet, community organizer, and activist. Their poems address issues of identity, emotion, racism, colonialism, and police brutality in the United States. They live in New Orleans.

Katwiwa graduated from Tulane University in 2014. They self-published a book of poetry, Becoming//Black, in 2015. They have also been touring the U.S. to perform spoken word poems since 2011. They gave a TED Talk in 2017 called "Black life at the intersection of birth and death." They work for Women with a Vision, a nonprofit based in New Orleans. They also work with slam poetry and open mic organizations in New Orleans.

They won the 2018 Women of the World Poetry Slam. At the poetry slam, Katwiwa performed "Dear White People" and "The Gospel of Colonization." Katwiwa also placed at both the 2015 and 2016 Individual World Poetry Slam.

Mwende Katwiwa is active in the Black Lives Matter movement, reproductive rights and abortion rights activism, and LGBTQ+ advocacy. Katwiwa is part of the New Orleans chapter of BYP100 and is involved with youth organizing. For example, they helped organize a protest march in 2014 regarding the killing of Michael Brown by police. Although they were primarily involved with in-person organizing, they also used the social media site Tumblr to promote the protest.

Katwiwa is genderqueer and uses they/them pronouns.

== Bibliography ==
- Alonso Castro, Laura María (2019). Slam Poetry vs. Racism: Awakening Awareness and Social Change in FreeQuency's "Dear White People" and "The Gospel of Colonization" (BA thesis). University of Zaragoza.
