= Tonya Ingram =

American poet and disability activist (1991–2022)

- Born: September 1, 1991; Cincinnati, Ohio, U.S.
- Died: December 30, 2022 (aged 31)
- Resting place: Hollywood Forever Cemetery
- Occupation: Poet
- Writing career
- Years active: 2011–2022
- Notable work: How To Survive Today
- Notable awards: New York Knicks Leader of Tomorrow Scholarship
- Website: web.archive.org/web/20230117070315/http://tonyaingram.com//

Tonya Ingram (September 1, 1991 – December 30, 2022) was an American poet, author, speaker, disability activist, and mental health advocate.

Ingram died on December 30, 2022, waiting for a kidney transplant.

== Life ==
=== Education ===
Ingram was a graduate of New York University and Otis College of Art and Design.

While at NYU, Ingram performed on the school's poetry slam team, which won the 2013 College Unions Poetry Slam Invitational. Ingram founded the team alongside Eric Silver, Matthew Sparacino, and Safia Elhillo. They were coached by Mahogany Browne.

=== Performance and poetry ===
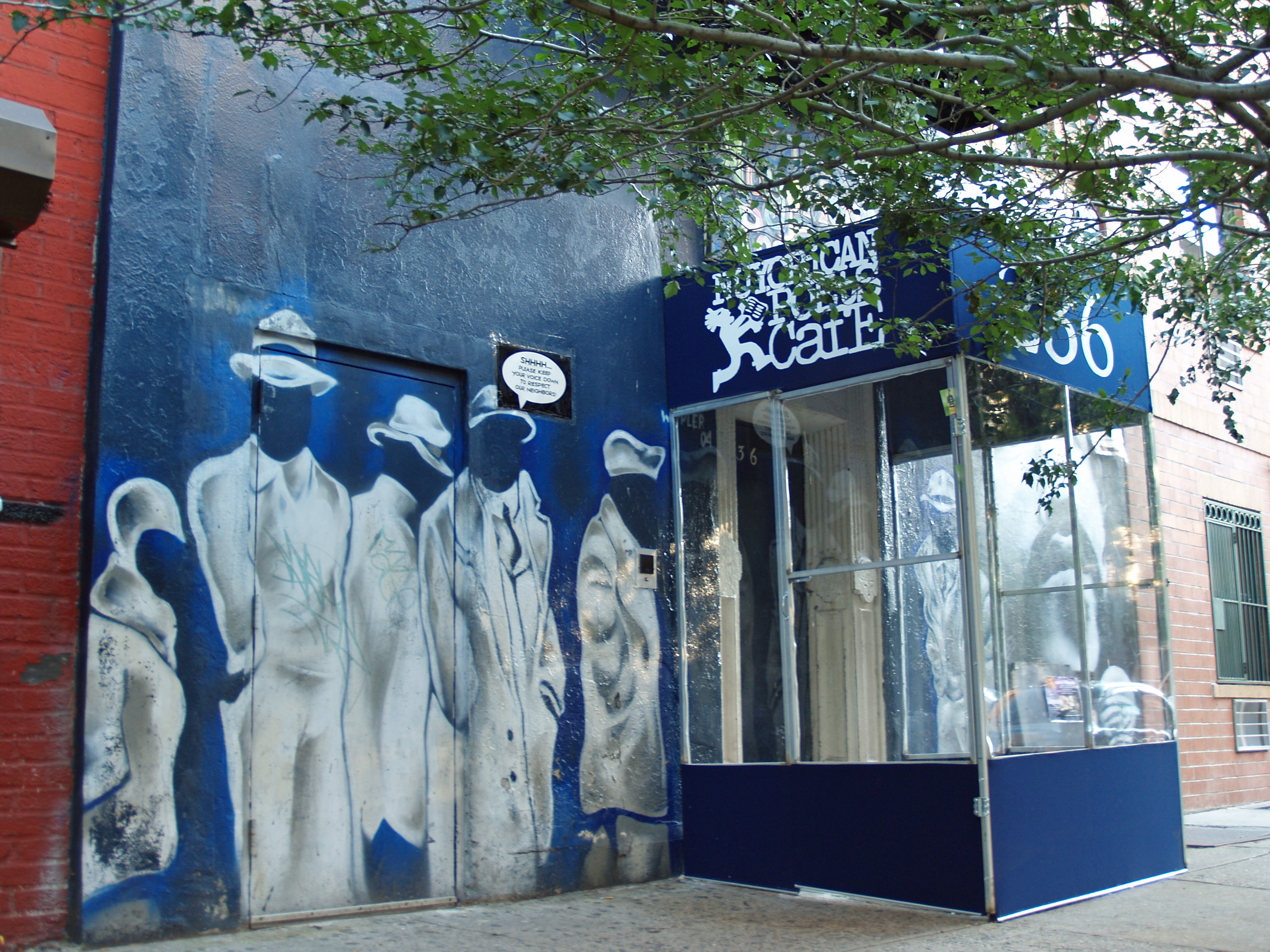
Nuyorican Poets Cafe, which Ingram frequently performed at

Ingram's writing was often about Black feminism and living with lupus and kidney failure.

Ingram performed at the Nuyorican Poets Café, The John F. Kennedy Center for the Performing Arts, and Lexus Verses and Flow's variety show.

Her work was featured in the 2021 Madewell "What Are You Made Of? Creatives of Color" campaign, Hallmark's Mahogany Writing Community and card brand, MIGA Swimwear, The New York Times, To Write Love on Her Arms, and Hello Giggles.

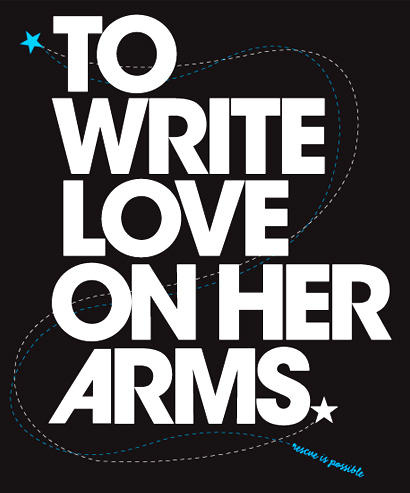
TWLOHA, Mental Health & Recovery organization Ingram wrote for

Ingram was the curator of Poetry in Color Live! at Los Angeles County Museum of Art.

=== Journalism and activism ===
In addition to poetry, Ingram wrote and contributed to high-profile journalistic pieces on wasted organ donations, the dysfunction of the American healthcare system, the impact of COVID-19 on disabled people, and other disability rights issues. In 2021, she testified as a patient on the kidney transplant waitlist on a House of Representatives hearing regarding the organ transplant system.

=== Surfing ===
In 2020, Ingram learned to surf through Color the Water and AdventureCrew, BIPOC surfing communities, and attended a surf retreat in Nicaragua.

== Search for a kidney ==
=== Efforts and advocacy ===
In 2019, at age 27, Ingram posted on Instagram looking for a living person willing to become her kidney donor. Utilizing journalism, Ingram and writer and organ-recipient, Kendall Ciesemier, asked the government to hold the organizations involved in OPS accountable, believing this would result in Ingram receiving a kidney. Ingram wrote an opinion essay; appeared in a government video; wrote letters to members of the Biden administration, including the Centers for Medicare and Medicaid Services (C.M.S.) administrator Chiquita Brooks-LaSure and the head of the Health Resources and Services Administration, Carole Johnson; worked with members of Congress, including Representative Katie Porter; and even testified before the House Oversight Subcommittee on Economic and Consumer Policy in May 2021.

=== Aftermath ===
Ingram told the House Oversight Subcommittee on Economic and Consumer Policy that she would die without the federal government's urgent action. A year and a half later, on December 30, 2022, Ingram died of complications from kidney failure.

In 2022, Ingram was one of 12,000 people on waiting lists who died or became too sick to receive a transplant.

Ingram's friend and fellow journalist, Kendall Ciesemier, commented on future potential for intervention in the organ procurement system by the American government:

"The solution already has bipartisan support and would be both cost-saving and lifesaving. The C.M.S. has projected that holding these government contractors accountable would save more than 7,000 lives a year — translating to $1 billion saved in forgone dialysis. If the 28,000 organs that go to waste each year were recovered and transplanted, the wait for livers and lungs could disappear within just two years...

Sometimes I wonder if the problem doesn't get solved because so many of the heroic advocates who square off against executives and their lobbyists have disappeared in sickness or in death. As someone born into illness, I've seen many of my young, sick friends die. It's always horrible, but Tonya's death was preventable. She ‌was the victim of a broken system, a system she tried so hard to change. Before too many others follow, Congress needs to hold the Biden administration to the bipartisan recommendations of the Senate Finance Committee: publish critical data, break up the national organ monopoly and replace the O.P.O.s whose failures hold patients' lives hostage.

Tonya did her part. Now it's on the Biden administration to finish the job."

== Death ==
Ingram was found unresponsive during a wellness check at her apartment around noon on December 30, 2022. Her death was announced in an Instagram post on New Year's Day.

Hernandez and his wife Alyesha Wise were close friends of Ingram's and raised $30,000 for funeral arrangements and to build a trust to send Ingram's 15-year-old younger sister to college. With the money, they honored Ingram's wish to have a green burial underneath a tree. The ceremony to bury her occurred on the grounds of Hollywood Forever Cemetery under a California Oak on January 27, 2023.

An article from the Los Angeles Times states, "Ingram was on the kidney donor wait list for three years. In an interview, [Matthew "Cuban"] Hernandez said he believed her death was preventable." The Biden administration subsequently announced intentions to reform the organ transplant system.

== Works ==
=== Books ===
- Growl and Snare, Penmanship Books, 2013
- Another Black Girl Miracle, Not a Cult, 2018
- How to Survive Today, Wild Awake Publishing, 2020

=== Performed poems ===
- "On Praying to God While Taking the SAT Exam", Brave New Voices, 2011
- "Thirteen", Intermedia Arts, 2013
- "Unsolicited Advice (after Jeanann Verlee)", CUPSI New York City, 2013
- "Isms", NPS Boston, 2013
- "Khaleesi", NPS Boston, 2013
- "I Am Twenty-Two", NPS Oakland, 2014
- "Raise Up", The Kennedy Center, 2014
- "Monster", NPS Oakland, 2015
- "We Are Full", NPS Oakland, 2015
- "Live", NPS Oakland, 2015
- "Suicide", Da Poetry Lounge Slam, 2015
- "An Open Letter to My Depression", BuzzFeed, 2015
- "Seven Commandments", Sofar NYC, 2016
- "I Am 24", Brooklyn Slam, 2016
- "Dear Discouraged", To Write Love On Her Arms, 2016
- "Until the Stars Collapse", Art Share, 2018
- "Here is What Loneliness / Love Tells You", Los Angeles Theatre Center, 2018
- "For the Next Lover", Los Angeles Theatre Center, 2018
- "On Days You Miss Your Ex", Los Angeles Theatre Center, 2018
- “how to be strong”, To Write Love On Her Arms, 2019

== Awards and titles ==
- Slam Champion, New York Knicks Poetry, 2011
- Recipient of $10,000, New York Knicks Leader of Tomorrow Scholarship, 2011
- Team Member at Urban Word, Second Place Team at Brave New Voices, 2011
- Team Co-founder, SLAM! NYU, 2012
- Slam Champion, SLAM! NYU Grand Slam, 2013
- Team Member at Nuyorican, Grand Slam Team, 2013
- Nominee, Pushcart Prize, 2014
- Team Member at Da Poetry Lounge, Slam Team, 2015

== Interviews ==
- "Lupus: Poet Tonya Ingram on Navigating the Organ Donor System", So Life Wants You Dead Podcast
- "Dating, Self-Care, and Chronic Illness", Just Break Up Podcast
- "Another Black Girl Miracle", We Have Jobs We Swear Podcast
- "The Journey and Intersections of Mental Health and Faith", Yas and Amen Podcast
- "007", Keep Creating Podcast
- "Tonya Ingram", Sexually Satisfied Woman Series
