= Edwin Bodney =

American poet

Edwin Bodney is an American slam poet based in Los Angeles and author of the book A Study of Hands (Not A Cult Press). They are one of the hosts of Da Poetry Lounge.

Various of Bodney's poems have been published by Button Poetry. They are the author and performer of the works: "Good Morning: A Story of Flight in the Making", and "When a boy tells you he loves you."

== Personal life ==
Bodney stated "my work is 101 percent autobiographical." They identify as queer. They have a degree from the Fashion Institute of Design & Merchandising.
