= Porsha Olayiwola =

Afrofuturist poet (born 1988)

- Born: Porsha Rashidaat J. Olayiwola; June 11, 1988 (age 38); Chicago
- Education: Emerson College
- Occupation: Poet Laureate of Boston
- Partner: Crystal Valentine
- Writing career
- Years active: 2008–present
- Movement: Afrofuturism
- Website: porshaolayiwola.com

Porsha Olayiwola (/ˈpɔɹʃəː ˈəʊl ˌji.wɔ ː lɑː/ por-shuh o-la-yi-war-la; born June 11, 1988) is a Black American poet based in Boston, Massachusetts.

== Early life ==
Of Nigerian and Black American descent (her father being a Yoruba man from Lagos and her mother being Black American), Olayiwola was born in Chicago. When Olayiwola was a child, her father was abruptly deported to Nigeria, forcing her mother to struggle alone to raise and support Olayiwola and her siblings. Olayiwola occasionally writes about the pain of growing up without her father physically present.

When speaking to Boston Hassle about how she discovered performance poetry, Olayiwola stated, "I used to write all kinds of things when I was in middle school. I was running for electoral office in eighth grade, and my speech was a poem. But it was a high school teacher who suggested Louder Than a Bomb, which is the largest youth spoken-word festival in the world that happens in Chicago. It was the first time I heard other young people writing well-crafted poems, and also the first time I was able to come up with what I thought at the time was a very cohesive piece. And I haven't stopped writing since that moment."

As an undergraduate, she performed poetry non-competitively on campus at the University of Illinois.

In 2010, after finishing her degree, Olayiwola moved to Boston to serve as an AmeriCorps VISTA for the National Coalition for the Homeless. She worked as the dean of enrichment at Codman Academy for five years and volunteered at Pine Street Inn, a homeless shelter in Boston.

== Career ==
Olayiwola holds a Bachelor of Arts degree in African American Studies and Gender and Women Studies from the University of Illinois, Champaign-Urbana, and an MFA from Emerson College.

In 2019, she was appointed the Poet laureate of Boston.

Her first poetry collection, i shimmer sometimes, too was released in 2019 by Button Poetry.

In 2020 her work was included in the exhibition Women Take the Floor at the Museum of Fine Arts, Boston.

Olayiwola is the Artistic Director at Massachusetts Literary Education and Performance (MassLEAP), an artistic nonprofit that empowers Massachusetts youth through writing, social justice, and community.

Olayiwola founded and led the first Roxbury Poetry Festival hosted at Blair Lot in Nubian Square on June 5, 2021. The festival included a keynote address from 2020 Pulitzer Prize winning poet, Jericho Brown and a live poetry slam, which awarded two local poets with Button Poetry book deals.

In September 2022, MFA and ICA-featured multimedia artist Stephen Hamilton unveiled a piece he created in Olayiwola's likeness titled, "Iya Ogun" Acrylic, enamel, and natural dyes and pigments on wood and Hand-woven and hand-dyed fabric.

In October 2022, she performed her poem, "SESTINA", at a Celtics pre-game ceremony for the opening game of the 2022-23 NBA season at T.D. Garden in honor of Bill Russell.

In November 2022, The Boston Globe announced that Olayiwola and Bing Broderick would create a bookstore in Fields Corner that would be "culturally curated, radically influenced, and locally inspired." They plan to open the store by the fall of 2023.

== Personal life ==
In 2016, Olayiwola began a relationship with New York City's former Youth Poet Laureate, Crystal Valentine. In 2017, they collaborated on poetry show, LEVITATE, focused on Black queer womanhood. In 2023, Olayiwola and Valentine became engaged.

== Poetry Competitions ==
=== Women of the World Poetry Slam ===
Olayiwola placed 2nd out of 72 poets at the Women of the World Poetry Slam Denver in 2012. She competed again, in 2013, at WoWPS Minneapolis and placed 4th out of 72.

=== Individual World Poetry Slam ===
In 2014, Olayiwola won the Individual World Poetry Slam in Phoenix. In 2015, she tied for 7th place with Javon Johnson at the competition in D.C.

=== National Poetry Slam ===
In an effort to create a free poetry slam space that centered the voices of Black poets, Olayiwola and Janae Johnson co-founded The House Slam in October 2014 at the Haley House Bakery Café in Roxbury.

In August 2015, Olayiwola coached and competed with House Slam at the National Poetry Slam Oakland where they beat 71 other teams to become champions in their first year. House Slam was the first Boston poetry slam team to compete at NPS, and thus, was the first Boston poetry slam team to win nationals. In its founding year, House Slam also became "the first venue in history to simultaneously hold the country's three major slam titles," according to the event's host, Poetry Slam Inc.

In 2016 in Decatur, and again, in 2017 in Denver, House Slam, coached by Olayiwola, won their way back to the NPS Final Stage and ranked third both years.

=== Brave New Voices ===
In August 2016, Olayiwola coached Mass LEAP's first team at Brave New Voices D.C. where they placed in the semi-finals. In 2017, she coached Mass LEAP's team at BNV Bay Area, which placed 2nd overall, and earned a spot performing on final stage for 3,200 people at the San Francisco Opera House. Again, in 2018, Olayiwola coached Mass LEAP's team at Brave New Voices Houston, where they took 4th place overall.

=== College Unions Poetry Slam Invitational ===
In April 2017, Olayiwola coached the Wellesley Out Loud team and the Fundamental Lyricists of Wheelock team, both in their first year of existence, at the College Unions Poetry Slam Invitational University of Illinois Chicago. Team Wellesley placed 35th and Wheelock placed 18th, out of 72 teams. In April 2018, Olayiwola coached Wellesley Out Loud's team at CUPSI Temple University, where they ranked 4th out of 66 teams.

== Awards ==
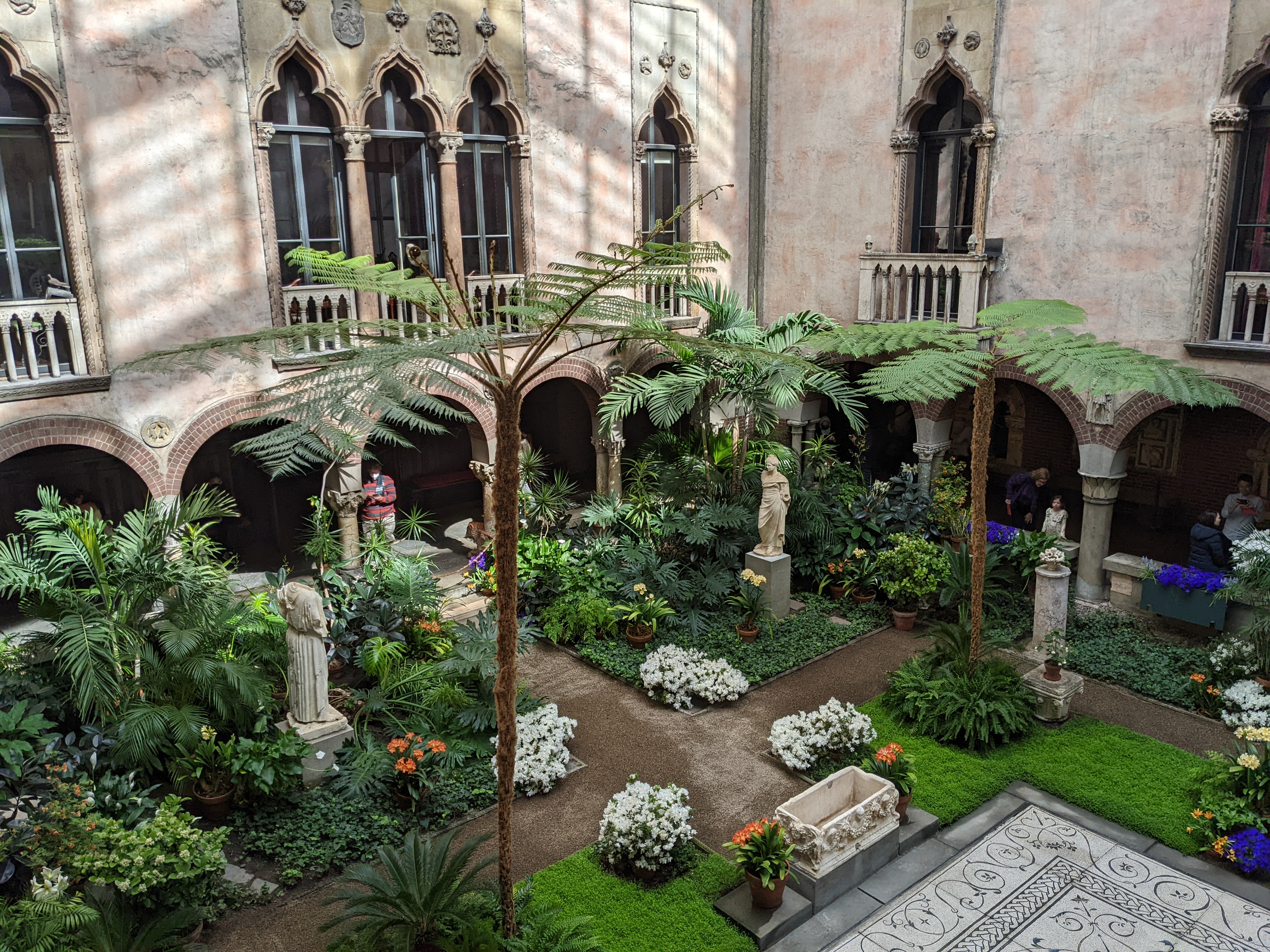
Isabella Stewart Gardner Museum, where Olayiwola was the artist in residence in 2021.

=== Championships ===
- 2014 Individual World Poetry Slam Champion, Phoenix
- 2015 National Poetry Slam Champion, Oakland

=== Residencies ===
- The Boston Foundation Brother Thomas Fellow, 2019
- Live Arts Boston Grantee, Afrofuturistic Storytelling, 2019
- Mayor's Office of Arts and Culture Boston Poet Laureate, Jan 2019 - Dec 2022
- Academy of American Poets Laureate Fellow, 2020
- Brown University Heimark Artist-in-Residence, 2020
- Isabella Stewart Gardner Museum Artist-in-Residence, 2021
- Just Buffalo Literary Center Fellow, 2021
- Brandeis University Jacob Ziskind Poet-in-Residence, 2022
- Studios at MASS MoCA Massachusetts Artist Fellow, 2022
- UW–Madison Office of Multicultural Arts Initiatives Interdisciplinary Artist-in-Residence, 2023

== Works ==
=== Poetry Collections ===
- i shimmer sometimes too Button Poetry, 2019. ISBN 978-1943735457

=== Poems ===
==== 2014–2016 ====
- "Water", Individual World Poetry Slam, 2014
- "Father's American Dream", Individual World Poetry Slam, 2014
- "Damn Right", National Poetry Slam, 2014
- "Angry Black Woman", Individual World Poetry Slam, 2014
- "Trigger", Individual World Poetry Slam, 2014
- "Capitalism", Individual World Poetry Slam, 2014
- "Fear", Individual World Poetry Slam, 2015
- "Rekia Boyd", NPS, 2015
- "Black Spells", SlamFind, January 2016
- "I Love You, Miley Cyrus", Providence Poetry Slam, 2016
- "One Black Boy Down", Providence Poetry Slam, 2016

==== 2017–2019 ====
- "how to make yourself small or how to be black and survive", Up The Staircase Quarterly, February 2017.
- "Unnamed," Button Poetry, May 2018
- "Ode to My Mouth", Button Poetry, May 2018
- "The Joke", Button Poetry, May 2018
- "Beyoncé be like...", May 2018
- "Black Stars," Get Lit Anthology, 2018.
- "Tangled aka Rapunzel aka Long-Hair-Don't-Care-and-What," Button Live, June 2018
- "Notorious," Academy of American Poets, 2019.
- "Twerk Villanelle," Academy of American Poets, 2019.
- "The Electric Slide Is Not A Dance, Man!" Academy of American Poets, 2019.
- "Boston Ode", City of Boston, January 2019.
- "God is Good All the time", Button Poetry, 2019
- "150th Anniversary of the Peace Jubilee", Boston Public Library, 2019
- "Tangled aka Rapunzel aka Long-Hair-Don't-Care-and-What," Festa Literária Internacional de Paraty Brazil, 2019

==== 2020–present ====
- "Dorothy Dips A Toe Into A Hotel Pool After Being Warned The Water Would Need To Be Drained If A Black Person Swam In It, 1953 Las Vegas", Indiana University Press, 2020
- "Finding a Black Queer Woman Love", Button Poetry, 2020
- "Parable", Button Poetry, 2020
- "A Brief Anecdote on Why White People Stopped Saying N*****", Button Poetry, 2020
- "We Drink At The Attenuation Well", Academy of American Poets, 2020.
- "Interlude at a Neighborhood Gas Station: 2001", Button Poetry, 2020
- "what is the suffrage movement to a blk womyn?", GBH News, 2020
- "Black As Light", Jewish Arts Collaborative, 2020
- "If You Tell It Backward," Academy of American Poets, 2021.
- "My Mother", Write About Now, 2021
- "Chaste Duplex," Triquarterly Issue: Black Voices, Triquarterly Press, 2021.
- "Keeper", Big Sister Boston, 2021
- "Black Beacon or History as a Crown of Sonnets", Boston NBC, 2020
- "Enquiry into The Lineage of Watermelons," Triquarterly Issue: Black Voices, Triquarterly Press, 2021.
- "Bring Me The Body," Wildness: Issue No, Wildness Press, February 2021.
- "The Cops Behind Us, I Hold My Breath," Wildness: Issue No, Wildness Press, February 2021.
- "After James Brown", Button Poetry, 2021
- "Goalkeepers", Gates Foundation, 2021
- "Plague of Blood Or The Murder-Drowning of Eugene Williams Sparks Race Riots for Eight Days", Just Buffalo Lit, 2021
- "today is a day of tiny massacres," Ours Poetica, February 2022
- "Praise Poem for the Rebellion", OGAA, February 2022
- "In the Wake," Boston Review, July 2022
- "Children's March," Boston Review, July 2022
- "THE PHILLIS¹, 1761," Boston Review, July 2022
- "SESTINA", NBA, October 2022

=== Anthologies ===
- BreakBeat Poets Volume: Black Girl Magic Anthology, Haymarket Books, 2018
- Dostoyevsky Wannabe Cities: Boston Anthology, 2019
- Cycle And Circumstance: The Vassar Review, 2021

=== Articles ===
- "I was born on the South Side of Chicago. Boston is where I came of age," Boston Globe, February 18, 2021.

=== Chapbooks ===
- 8339 Colfax, 2016

=== Poetry Shows ===
- LEVITATE, 2017
- Black And Ugly As Ever, 2019.
- Spirit, 2019
- ALRIGHT, 2022
