= Oompa =

American rapper, poet, and vocalist

- Born: Lakiyra Williams Roxbury, MA
- Genres: hip-hop; R&B
- Years active: 2016–present
- Formerly of: HipStory
- Website: www.oompoutloud.com

Lakiyra Williams, known professionally as Oompa, is a rapper, poet, and vocalist from Roxbury, Massachusetts.

== Early life ==
=== Childhood ===
Oompa was put into foster care at six weeks old. She grew up in Academy Homes, a low-income housing development near Jackson Square. When she was 5, she and her two biological sisters were adopted.

Oompa started rapping in middle school, competing in battle rap in the cafeteria for lunch money. As a kid, she played basketball at Washington Park in Roxbury, where she was given the nickname, "Oompa Loompa" because she was short and speedy. This inspired her stage name.

In high school, Oompa's sister, Nicky, died from lupus.

=== Education ===
Oompa attended Bucknell University in Lewisburg, PA, on a full ride scholarship. She performed rap and poetry at open mics on campus and taught herself how to professionally record music in her college's computer lab.

In 2009, when she was a freshman in college, Oompa's mom died, which she described in 2019 as "the hardest thing in my life, thus far." Her debut album "November 3rd" was named for the day her mom died, and features the track, "Dear Mama" in dedication. After her mother's death, Oompa took a leave of absence from school to care for her younger sister while she was still a minor. They struggled with food insecurity and homelessness. Oompa returned to Bucknell later on, changed her major from mathematics, and earned an undergraduate degree in English and Education.

== Poetry career ==
In 2016, Oompa won a spot on the Boston House Slam team. The team qualified for finals at the National Poetry Slam. She also coached a team of youth poets for Louder than a Bomb Massachusetts, who placed 5th in the state. In 2017, Oompa won the Women of the World Poetry Slam in Dallas, Texas.

She has stated about her experience doing slam poetry, "A lot of slam was competition over who has the most important oppression and how awful things are. The truth is suffering is part of the human condition. We all hurt. It's not a competition."

== Music career ==
In 2022, Oompa performed at Boston Calling Music Festival, was accepted into The Recording Academy, and was one of 12 artists selected to be a part of Pepsi Music Lab Academy class of 22–23'. In 2023, Oompa performed at the Boston Celtics half-time performance at TD Garden, and at Massachusetts Governor Maura Healy's inauguration. In August 2023, Oompa's song, "Outta Patience", was featured in a Beats commercial starring Alessia Russo for the Women's World Cup.

Oompa has won four Boston Music Awards. She has performed with Jill Scott, 2-Chainz, Marc Rebillet, Palehound, and Brandi Carlile.

=== Influences ===
Oompa has cited Jay-Z, Lauryn Hill, J. Cole, Kendrick Lamar, James Brown, Gospel music, and Black music across genres as her influences.

=== Critical acclaim ===
In 2016, Oompa joined HipStory (founded by Cliff Notez and Tim Hall), a Boston collective and multimedia production company that worked with her to record and release her first album, "November 3rd". A review from Sound of Boston called Oompa's rhymes "deadly" and referred to the project as "a deeply confessional collection of songs over smooth soul beats". The album was listed as one of Allston Pudding's favorite albums of the year and DigBoston's Top 30 Local Albums of the year in 2016.

In 2019, Oompa released the album, "Cleo", named for Queen Latifah's character in Set It Off. WBUR commented, that the songs on "Cleo" "all benefit from Oompa's keen sense of melody, her knack for grabbing the ear with a certain phrase or rhythm and telling it something funny and incisive and memorable". Telegram called the album captivating and viscerally inspiring. Allston Pudding attended the album release and called the performance of "Cleo" "powerful from beginning to end". With "Cleo", Oompa landed on NPR's Slingshot Artist to Watch list.

In 2021, Oompa released the album, "Unbothered". The Harvard Crimson characterized the album as, "personal, unapologetic, inspirational, and incredibly deserving of all the glowing receptions it will receive". Vanyaland called the album, "a sacred space, the Boston's emcee commitment to herself — and her listeners — to cultivate a life worth living". Galore Mag hailed Oompa as having "a cadence and energy akin to the legendary Missy Elliott and the poetic finesse of Noname". The Three-Sixty Mag called "Unbothered", "an album brimming with gems". Okayplayer named the project to their 15 New Hip-Hop & R&B Albums You Should Be Listening To list, and called the project, "an album riddled with self-reflective undertones and vibrant lyrics".

=== Cultural impact ===
Oompa is on the leadership council at The Record Co., a nonprofit that provides affordable rehearsal and recording space for Boston-based music makers. Oompa partnered with the Somerville Arts Council to create Black, Brown & Queer Fest. The Gumbo has praised Oompa's music for uplifting women.

According to Boston, in 2022, "she was one of 12 people and organizations awarded $500,000 in workforce development contracts as part of a program established by the city's Mayor's Office of Arts and Culture. She's using the funding to establish Outlaud Entertainment, an artists' collective and incubator that will mentor five emerging artists over the course of fifteen months."

== Personal life ==
In 2023, Oompa reconnected with her birth father, who was a popular R & B singer in the '90s.

== Awards ==
- Pepsi's Music Lab Class of '22-'23
- City of Boston, Workforce Development Contracts For Artists And Creative Workers, 2022
- City of Cambridge's Local Cultural Council Grants, 2022
- Live Artist of the Year, Boston Music Awards, 2022
- NPR Slingshot Artist to Watch, 2020
- Live Artist of the Year, Boston Music Awards, 2019
- The Boston Foundation Brother Thomas Fellow, 2019
- Unsigned Artist of the Year, Boston Music Awards, 2018
- 617Session Winner, Boston Music Awards, 2018
- Passim Awards Iguana Music Fund Grant Recipient, 2018
- Women of the World Poetry Slam Champion, 2017
- National Poetry Slam finalist, 2016
- Allston Pudding's favorite albums of the year, 2016
- DigBoston's Top 30 Local Albums of the year, 2016

== Discography ==
Albums
Title	Year	Source
Unbothered	2021	
Cleo	2019	
November 3	2016	

Singles
Title	Year	Source
"Think Too Much"	2023	
"OUTTA PATIENCE"	2021	
"LEBRON"	2021	
"Go"	2021	
"Closer"	2020	
"By You"	2019	
"Feel Like Cole"	2019	
"Your Girl"	2016	

Music videos
Title	Year	Source
"Think Too Much"	2023	
"LEBRON"	2021	
"Go"	2021	
"Closer"	2020	
"Feel Like Cole"	2019	
"I Deserve That"	2018	
