= Terisa Siagatonu =

Samoan poet, and community organizer

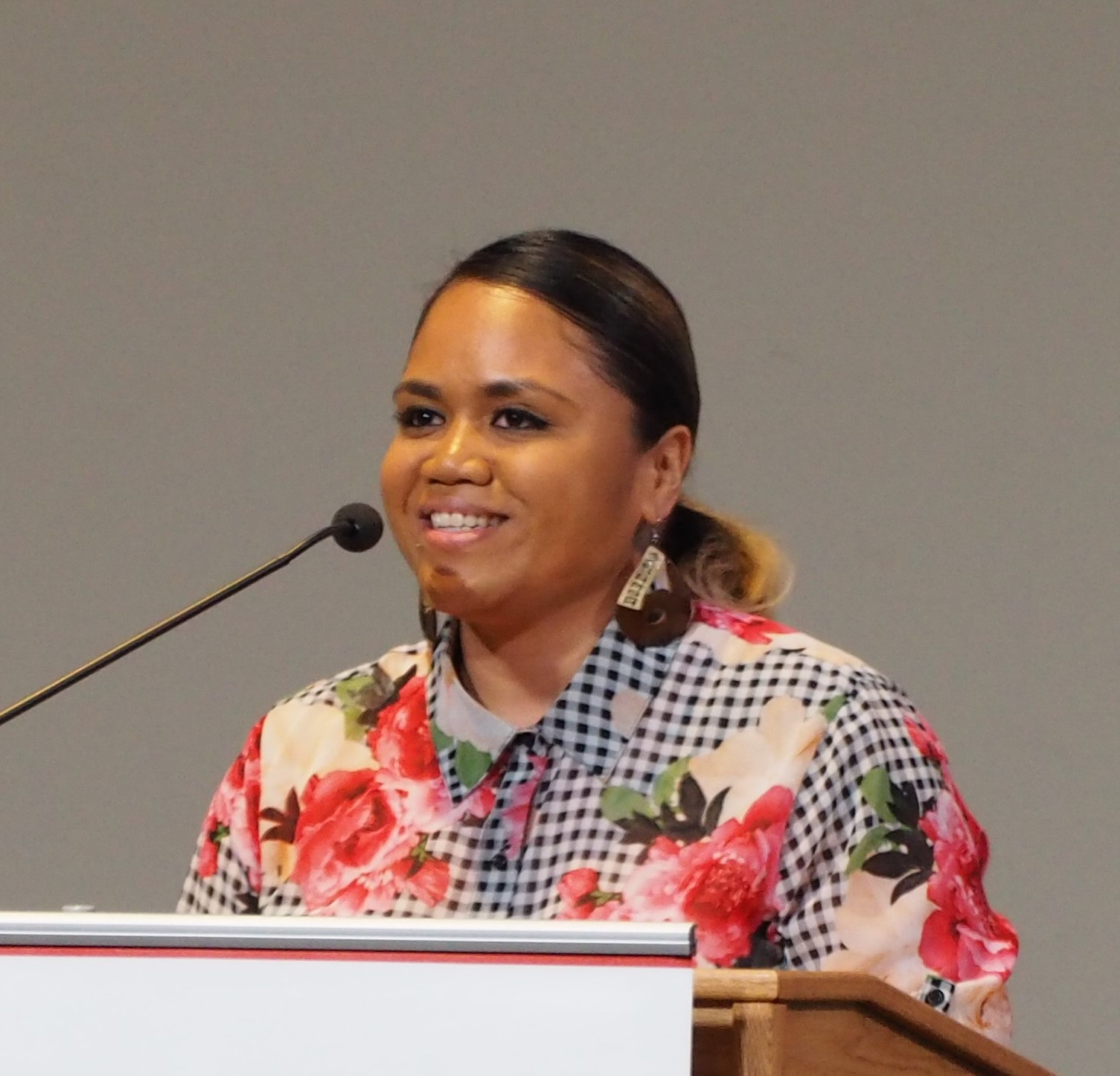
- Alma mater: University of Southern California; University of California, Santa Cruz
- Occupation: Poet
- Employer: University of California, Los Angeles
- Awards: Kundiman Fellowship (2019–); Champion of Change (2012)
- Website: www.terisasiagatonu.com

Terisa Tinei Siagatonu is a Samoan spoken word poet, arts educator, and community organizer. In 2012, she was awarded a Champion of Change Award for her activism.

== Early life ==
Siagatonu was born in San Francisco, CA. She was the first on her father's side to attend college. Siagatonu graduated from the University of California, Santa Cruz in 2011 with a Bachelor's Degree in community studies and a minor in education. While there, she experienced spoken word for the first time and began writing. During college she competed in poetry slams, taught spoken word poetry to students, and was a Youth Speaks mentor. She earned a Master of Arts in Marriage/FamilyTherapy from the University of Southern California.

== Career ==
She served as Project Director for the Pacific Islander Education and Retention project (PIER) at University of California, Los Angeles.

She is a slam poet and coach. She works as an activist in LGBTQ rights, racial justice, mental health, gender equity and climate change, President Obama recognized Siagatonu with a Champion of Change Award in 2012. She spoke at the 2015 United Nations Climate Change Conference. One of her concerns is Hawaii’s Mauna Kea volcano.

Her work as a Kundiman Fellow and 2019 Yerba Buena Center for the Arts 100 List Honoree, was published in Poetry Magazine and was featured on Button Poetry, CNN, NBCNews, NPR, Huffington Post, KQED, Everyday Feminism, The Guardian, BuzzFeed, and Upworthy.

Siagatonu is a queer Samoan woman and activist. She spoke at the Obama White House and to the UN Conference on Climate Change in Paris, France. She stated that the most memorable moment in her career was receiving President Obama’s Champion of Change Award in 2012.

== Works ==
- Raise Up - Terisa Siagatonu, Millennium Stage, November 10, 2014
- "Trigger" Terisa Siagatonu Button Poetry, December 21, 2014
- "Moana Means Home" Terisa Siagatonu, April 21, 2018
- "Ethnic Studies" Ink Knows No Borders, March 3, 2019
