= Kendall Ciesemier =

American journalist

- Education: Georgetown University
- Occupations: Writer, producer, reporter
- Known for: Founding Kids Caring 4 Kids
- Website: http://www.kendallciesemier.com/

Kendall Ciesemier is a writer, producer, and reporter, originally from Wheaton, Illinois. She is also the founder of Kids Caring 4 Kids, a non-profit organization she started at age 11.

== Early life and education ==
=== Kids Caring 4 Kids ===
After watching a special of The Oprah Winfrey Show about the AIDS epidemic in Africa, Ciesemier founded the volunteer organization Kids Caring 4 Kids in 2005. In May 2007, Ciesemier was named one of America's top ten youth volunteers by Prudential and the National Association of Secondary School Principals. In 2010, she was named one of Glamour Magazine's top ten women of the year for her service work. Ciesemier was also awarded a Daily Point of Light Award for her work doing Kids Caring 4 Kids by Points of Light. The Daily Point of Light Award was created by President George H.W Bush to "honor individuals and groups creating meaningful change in communities across America".

On August 31, 2007, Ciesemier received a surprise visit from US President Bill Clinton at an assembly at Wheaton North High School in recognition of her service. Clinton and Ciesemier then went to appear on The Oprah Winfrey Show. The episode was broadcast on September 4, 2007. On the show, Clinton announced that his friend would be donating half-a-million dollars to Ciesemier's organization.

=== Education ===
Ciesemier attended Franklin Middle School in Wheaton, Illinois, where she was a student when she formed Kids Caring 4 Kids. She graduated from Georgetown University in Washington, DC with a Bachelor of Arts in Sociology. While at Georgetown, she co-hosted a radio show called "He Said, She Said" with her older brother Connor, which covered pop culture and current events.

Ciesemier later attended the New York Film Academy for a six-week program in documentary production.

== Career ==
Ciesemier worked as a production assistant at CBS This Morning during the 2016 presidential election. She later worked as a producer and reporter for both The New York Times' Opinion Section and Mic.

While at Mic, Ciesemier interviewed Alice Marie Johnson, who was serving life without parole for a first-time nonviolent drug offense. The interview inspired Kim Kardashian to advocate for the clemency of Johnson.

Ciesemier currently works for the American Civil Liberties Union as a host of the podcast At Liberty and as a multimedia producer.

=== Friendship and work with Tonya Ingram ===
In 2019, at age 27, Tonya Ingram posted on Instagram looking for a living person willing to become her kidney-donor. The organ procurement system (OPS) in the United States, run by the United Network for Organ Sharing (UNOS), as of 2019, failed to recover around 28,000 organs a year. Utilizing journalism, Ingram and writer and organ-recipient, Ciesemier, asked the government to hold the organizations involved in OPS accountable, believing this would result in Ingram receiving a kidney.

Ingram told the House Oversight Subcommittee on Economic and Consumer Policy that she would die without the federal government's urgent action. A year and a half later, on Dec. 30, 2022, Ingram died of complications from kidney failure.

In 2022, Ingram was one of 12,000 people on waiting lists who died or became too sick to receive a transplant.

Ingram's friend and fellow journalist, Ciesemier, commented on future potential for intervention in the organ procurement system by the American government:

"The solution already has bipartisan support and would be both cost-saving and lifesaving. The C.M.S. has projected that holding these government contractors accountable would save more than 7,000 lives a year — translating to $1 billion saved in forgone dialysis. If the 28,000 organs that go to waste each year were recovered and transplanted, the wait for livers and lungs could disappear within just two years...

Sometimes I wonder if the problem doesn't get solved because so many of the heroic advocates who square off against executives and their lobbyists have disappeared in sickness or in death. As someone born into illness, I've seen many of my young, sick friends die. It's always horrible, but Tonya's death was preventable. She ‌was the victim of a broken system, a system she tried so hard to change. Before too many others follow, Congress needs to hold the Biden administration to the bipartisan recommendations of the Senate Finance Committee: publish critical data, break up the national organ monopoly and replace the O.P.O.s whose failures hold patients' lives hostage.

Tonya did her part. Now it's on the Biden administration to finish the job."

== Personal life ==
Ciesemier was born with a rare liver disease called biliary atresia and has undergone two liver transplants at Children's Memorial Hospital in Chicago. In 2010, she was part of the design team for its replacement, the Lurie Children's Hospital. She has stated that her own personal struggles are part of what inspired her to help others.
