= Alyesha Wise =

American writer

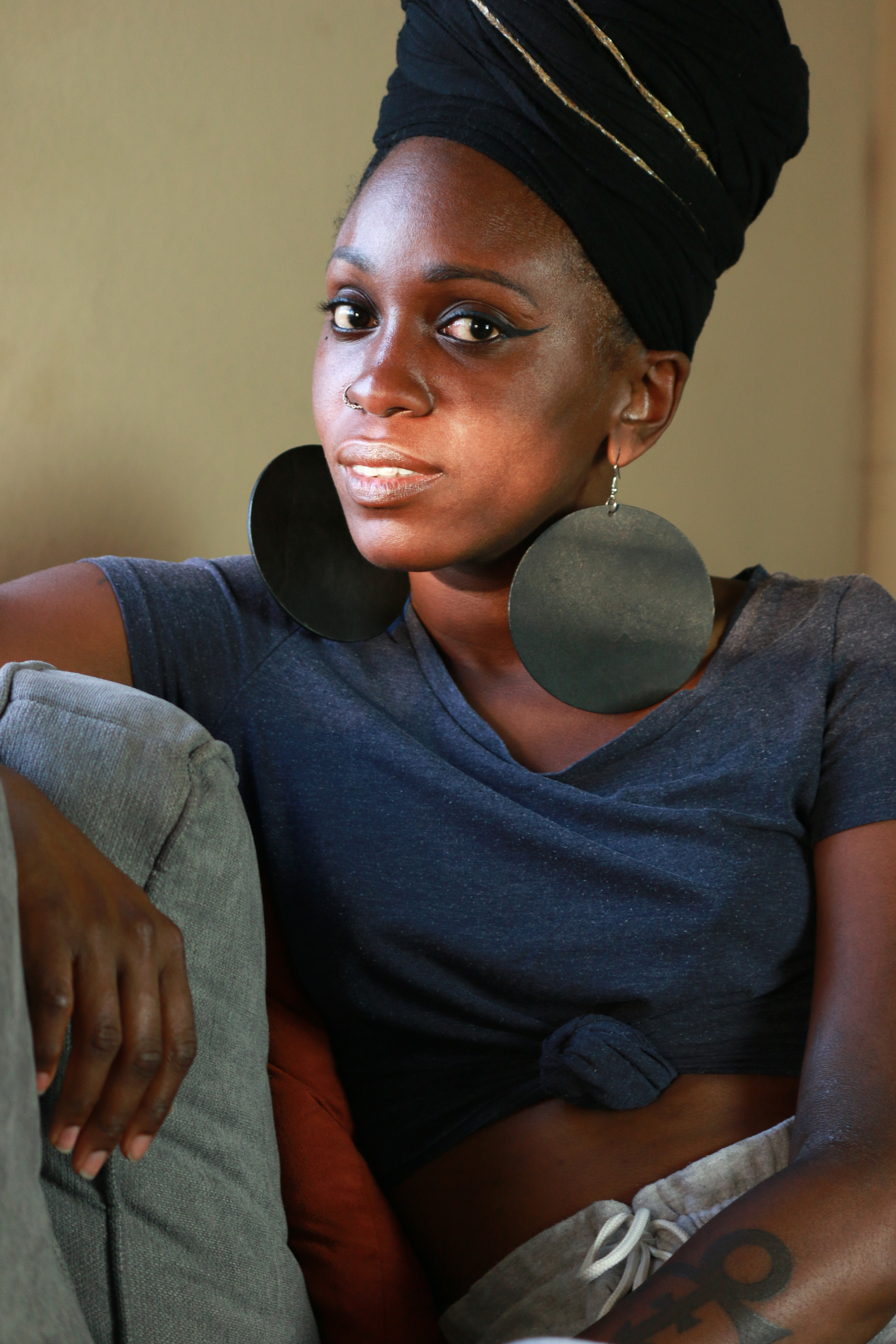
- Wise in 2018
- Born: Camden, New Jersey, U.S.
- Occupations: Poet, Speaker, Teaching Artist
- Writing career
- Genre: Poetry
- Notable work: Carnival

Alyesha Wise, also known as Ms. Wise, is a poet, teaching artist and co-founder of Spoken Literature Art Movement (S.L.A.M). From Camden, New Jersey, Alyesha currently resides in Los Angeles where she also serves as a teaching artist for Street Poets, Inc.

Wise previously served as the head coach of Da Poetry Lounge's slam team and a co-coach for the Get Lit Youth slam team. She co-founded and was a co-host of The Pigeon Presents: The Philadelphia Poetry Slam. She has been featured in a speaking engagement on the TEDx Talk series in which she dedicated the talk to her younger sister and Camden. While in Philadelphia, Wise was a co-host of Jus Words, the longest running weekly open mic in the city at the time.

Wise is the founder and organizer of Black Women Necessary, a safe space for black women. Wise also served as a former teaching artist and volunteer coordinator at New Earth, and continues to teach and mentor in Los Angeles youth detention centers. In 2017, she authored the book, Carnival. Ron Howard once said about Alyesha's performance style, "Very Powerful."

Wise's poetry commonly expresses themes of feminism, African-American culture, bodies and inherited trauma, social justice, queerness, and sexual assault.

== Personal life ==
=== Early life ===
Wise is originally from Camden, New Jersey. She has five siblings (Wise is the second oldest girl) and was raised mostly by her mother. Her parents got divorced when she was five. After watching Poetic Justice, at age 11, she wrote her first poem titled, "Black History."

=== Adulthood ===
Wise moved to Philadelphia in 2006. Wise identified as a lesbian for eight years, and has had relationships with women.

== Awards ==
- 2018 2nd place Da Poetry Lounge National Poetry Slam
- 2014 Da Poetry Lounge Hollywood Grand Slam Champion
- Two-time Women of the World Poetry Slam finalist
- 2012 Queens Inspire Kings award presented by Kings Rule Together
- 2010 5th in the Women of the World Poetry Slam in 2010

== Notable performances ==
- "We Will" with ACLU of Southern California
- "Raising Her By Raising Myself" TEDx
- "Cannibal (A Poem to White Supremacy)"
- "To This Black Woman Body, Part I"
- "A Story of My Love Affair With Prince"
  - Originally performed at PhilaMOCA in Philadelphia for the TV show, Articulate on WHYY.

== Bibliography ==
- Wise, Alyesha (2017). Carnival : A Book of Poetry. Not A Cult Press. ISBN 9781945649042.
