= Kimberly J. Simms =

American poet, educator and non-profit leader

Kimberly J. Simms is a South Carolina poet, educator, and non-profit leader. Recognized for her contributions to the poetry slam community, Simms is celebrated for her work exploring the lives and voices of textile mill workers in the Piedmont region, as well as for her involvement in poetry performance and education.

== Early life ==
Simms was raised in Greenville, South Carolina. At age 18, she founded the first poetry slam in South Carolina and became the youngest "slammaster" in the country.

== Literary career ==
Simms is the author of the poetry collection Lindy Lee: Songs on Mill Hill (2017), which chronicles the lives of textile workers in the Piedmont region with historical accuracy and imaginative insight. Her poetry explores themes of sorrow, joy, resilience, and redemption, and has appeared in literary magazines, community projects, and anthologies.

She is a former Writer-in-Residence at the Carl Sandburg Home National Historic Site and a featured speaker for the SC Humanities Council’s Speakers Bureau. Her work is archived in the South Carolina Poetry Archives at Furman University.

Simms is known in the performance poetry scene, winning the 1998 Southern Fried Poetry Slam as a member of the first Greenville Slam Team, the first all women slam team in the nation. She was the founding director of the Say What Slam team and a pioneer in slam poetry.

== Non-profit leadership ==
In 2002, Simms founded Wits End Poetry, a literary non-profit organization dedicated to promoting poetry and the spoken word. Under her leadership, Wits End Poetry became a cornerstone of South Carolina’s literary community, organizing workshops, slams, and literary festivals. She was the director of the first individual World Poetry Slam in 2004. While on the board of Poetry Slam Inc., she conceptualized the Women of the World Poetry Slam. Her non-profit work focuses on fostering creative communities and supporting emerging writers.

== Honors and recognition ==
Simms has been a TedX speaker and a featured poet at literary festivals.

== Selected bibliography ==
- Lindy Lee: Songs on Mill Hill (2017)
- Various literary magazines and anthologies

== See also ==
- South Carolina Poetry Archives
