= Amal Kassir =

American spoken word poet (born 1995)

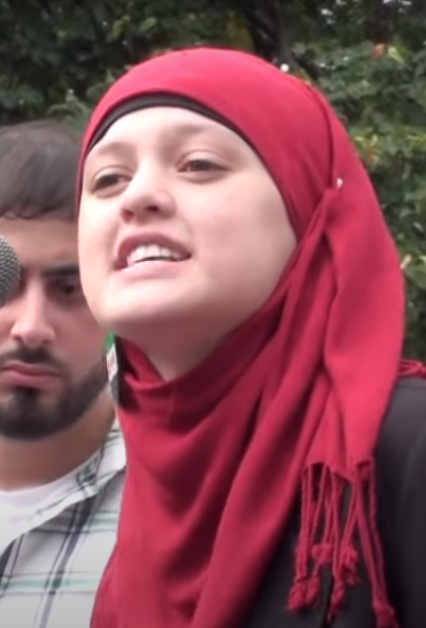
- Amal Kassir reading "An open letter to Bashar", White House South Lawn, 5 September 2015
- Born: June 6, 1995 (age 30); Denver, Colorado, United States
- Occupation: Poet

Amal Kassir (Arabic: امل قصير; born June 6, 1995) is an American international award winning spoken word poet.

== Early life and education ==
Amal Kassir was born on 6 June 1995 in Denver. She is the fourth of five children. Her name means "hope" in Arabic. She was born to Melissa, an Iowa-German convert to Islam living in Nebraska and Mahmoud Kassir, a Syrian. Her mom had converted to Islam as a teenager. They moved to Denver to join a growing Muslim community. She was passionate for human rights from a young age, as her mother recalled how once when Amal was four and they were cleaning the garage, the child climbed atop the pile of castoff items and began reciting the Pledge of Allegiance. "She thrust her finger in the air and shouted, 'And liberty and justice for all!'" Melissa Kassir recalled. As two years later the terrorist attack against the Twin Towers on the 11 September occurred, a person threw a brick-stone through the window of the family restaurant and Kassir was insulted for wearing a hijab. Her parents decided to move to Kassir's grandmother's house on the outskirts of the Syrian capital, Damascus. Amal Kassir lived in Syria for three years, learning Arabic and bonded with her "60-something cousins." On her first day at the private school her parents sent her to, a teacher asked Amal which she liked better, America or Syria. When Amal replied "America," the teacher slapped her face. A decade later, Kassir grieved as 15 of those family members were killed during the Syrian civil war. After attending community college, Kassir graduated from the University of Colorado Boulder.

== Career ==
She gives tours around the United States, reciting poetry and has given TED talks. In her poetry she reflects on how the Syrian civil war has affected her. During the 2009 Gaza war, she wrote a poem reflecting on its destruction. She sings in Arabic as well. After Donald Trump signed Executive Order 13769 in 2017, limiting immigration in 2017, she led protests against it.

Kassir now resides in Hillsborough, North Carolina with her husband and daughter. In 2025, she was named the Poet Laureate of the Town of Hillsborough by the Hillsborough Arts Council.

== See also ==
- Emtithal Mahmoud
