= Desireé Dallagiacomo =

American poet

Desireé Dallagiacomo is an American poet and teaching artist raised in northern California. She is of European and Choctaw descent, and she is an enrolled citizen of the Choctaw Nation of Oklahoma. Her first book of poetry, SINK, was published by Button Poetry in March 2019. Before publishing her first full-length collection, her poems amassed millions of views on YouTube. Her poems, "Thighs Say" “Real Sex Tips.” and “Shave Me” among others were first published by Button Poetry. She is a Pushcart Prize Nominee.

She is in the Helen Zell Writers' program at the University of Michigan.

She founded The Heart of It Writing Retreat.

== Awards ==
- 2013 Southwest Shootout Regional Slam Champion
- University of New Orleans recipient of the Ryan Chigazola Poetry Scholarship.
- 2014 Individual National Poetry Slam ranked 3rd
- 2014 National Poetry Slam, 3rd place with Slam New Orleans
- 2014 Pushcart Prize nominee
- 2015 Women Of the World Poetry Slam ranked 3rd
- 2017 Brave New Voices International Poetry Slam Champion (Head Coach)

== Selected performances ==
- “Thighs Say,“ 2014 Individual World Poetry Slam Finals in Phoenix, Arizona
- "Shave Me," 2015 Women Of The World Poetry Slam
- (with Kaycee Filson) "Real Sex Tips," 2014 National Poetry Slam
- "Drop Off Lines"

== Publications ==
=== Books ===
- 2012 The Year of the Institution, Next Left Press
- 2014 Dimly Lit, Next Left Press
- 2019 Sink, Button Poetry

== Early life ==
Desireé Dallagiacomo was born in Medford, Oregon on June 13, 1990. She was raised by a single mother, and is the youngest of five children. She graduated from the University of California, Santa Cruz with a BA in Feminist Studies and a certificate from the Visualizing Abolition Studies program. Dallagiacomo is originally from Chico, California but moved to Baton Rouge, Louisiana in 2010.
