= Dominique Christina =

American performance poet

- Born: 1974 (age 51–52)
- Education: University of Arkansas at Monticello
- Writing career
- Notable awards: National Poetry Series Champion (2012); Women of the World Poetry Slam (2012) (2014)

Dominique Christina (born 1974) is a writer, performer and social activist. She is a champion at the National Poetry Series and Women of the World Poetry Slam.

Christina's 4th book Anarcha Speaks won the National Poetry Series in 2017.

== Education ==
Christina obtained a bachelor's degree in African American Studies from the University of the Pacific. She earned her Master of Education in English Language and Literature from the University of Arkansas at Monticello.

Christina began writing poetry in 1996; she was taking her master's degree when she decided to enroll in a creative writing class.

== Career ==
Christina is influenced by her family's involvement in the civil rights movement. She performs as a speaker and slam poet, often discussing social issues such as racism and sexism. She has spoken at colleges and universities across the United States and has been a keynote speaker at women's conferences. She also appeared at the HBO series High Maintenance as an actress and contributing writer.

Christina went viral with The Period Poem. It was written in response to the tweet of a man saying he dumped his girlfriend because she menstruated during intercourse.

Christina was hailed champion at the National Poetry Series Slam in 2012. In 2017, her book Anarcha Speaks won an award from the same body. In 2012 and 2014, she was hailed as Women of the World Poetry Slam Champion. She earned the National Underground Poetry Slam Champion in 2013.

== Works ==
Christina released poetry collection The Bones, the Breaking, the Balm: A Colored Girl's Hymnal in 2014, where she contemplated upon the African-American girl experience. In They Are All Me (2015), Christina commemorated African-American heroes and martyrs.

This Is Woman’s Work: Calling Forth Your Inner Council of Wise, Brave, Crazy, Rebellious, Loving, Luminous Selves was published in 2015. It is a self-help book that explores the wisdom of female archetypes so as to integrate it in the psyche and empower oneself. It contains poetry, prose and writing exercises. The book extracts spiritual, historical and literary examples.

Anarcha Speaks: A History in Poems was released in 2018. The poetry collection is reimagined in the perspective of slave Anarcha Westcott, who endured experimentation under the medical trials of Dr. J Marion Sims, the father of modern gynecology.

In 2021, after a two-year investigation by the Aurora Police Department, Dominique was convicted of stealing a house, sentenced to three years probation and a fine of over one hundred thousand dollars. She is a multiple convicted felon.
