= Da Poetry Lounge =

Los Angeles arts venue

- Nickname: DPL
- Status: Active
- Venue: Greenway Court Theatre; ORA Urban Cafe
- Location: Los Angeles
- Country: United States
- Inaugurated: 1998
- Founders: Dante Basco; Ron "Shihan" VanClief; Devan "Poetri" Smith "Brutha" Gimmel Hooper
- Major events: Poetry slam
- Website: dapoetrylounge.com

Da Poetry Lounge is the largest weekly open mic performance space for poetry in the U.S. It is located in Los Angeles at the Greenway Court Theatre.

== History ==
Da Poetry Lounge was founded in 1998 as "Dante's Poetry Lounge" by poets Dante Basco, Ron "Shihan" VanClief, Devan "Poetri" Smith and "Brutha" Gimmel Hooper. Da Poetry Lounge was originally hosted in Basco’s living room for three years before expanding to the Greenway Court Theatre.

The DPL has a slam poetry team that performs in national poetry competitions. Performers have to show up to the Tuesday night readings early to sign up to perform. The artists then perform on a first-come-first-served basis.

Da Poetry Lounge inspired “Def Poetry Jam” on HBO and on Broadway.

In 2010, Javon Johnson published “Manning Up: Race, Gender, and Sexuality in Los Angeles' Slam and Spoken Word Poetry Communities”, an essay addressing the prevalence of sexism at Da Poetry Lounge.

In 2018, Da Poetry Lounge was hosted by Edwin Bodney.

From March 2020 to November 2021, DPL held their events virtually in order to keep workers, performances, and audience members safe during the COVID-19 pandemic.

On December 30, 2022, Tonya Ingram, a poet who frequented Da Poetry Lounge and performed on DPL’s 2015 team at the National Poetry Slam, died from kidney failure.

== Notable performers ==
Da Poetry Lounge has featured performances from Yesika Salgado, Walela Nehanda, Elizabeth Acevedo, Alyesha Wise, Tonya Ingram, Olivia Gatwood, Rudy Francisco, Kevin Coval, Dante Basco, and Javon Johnson.
