= Iyeoka Okoawo =

American singer-songwriter

Iyeoka
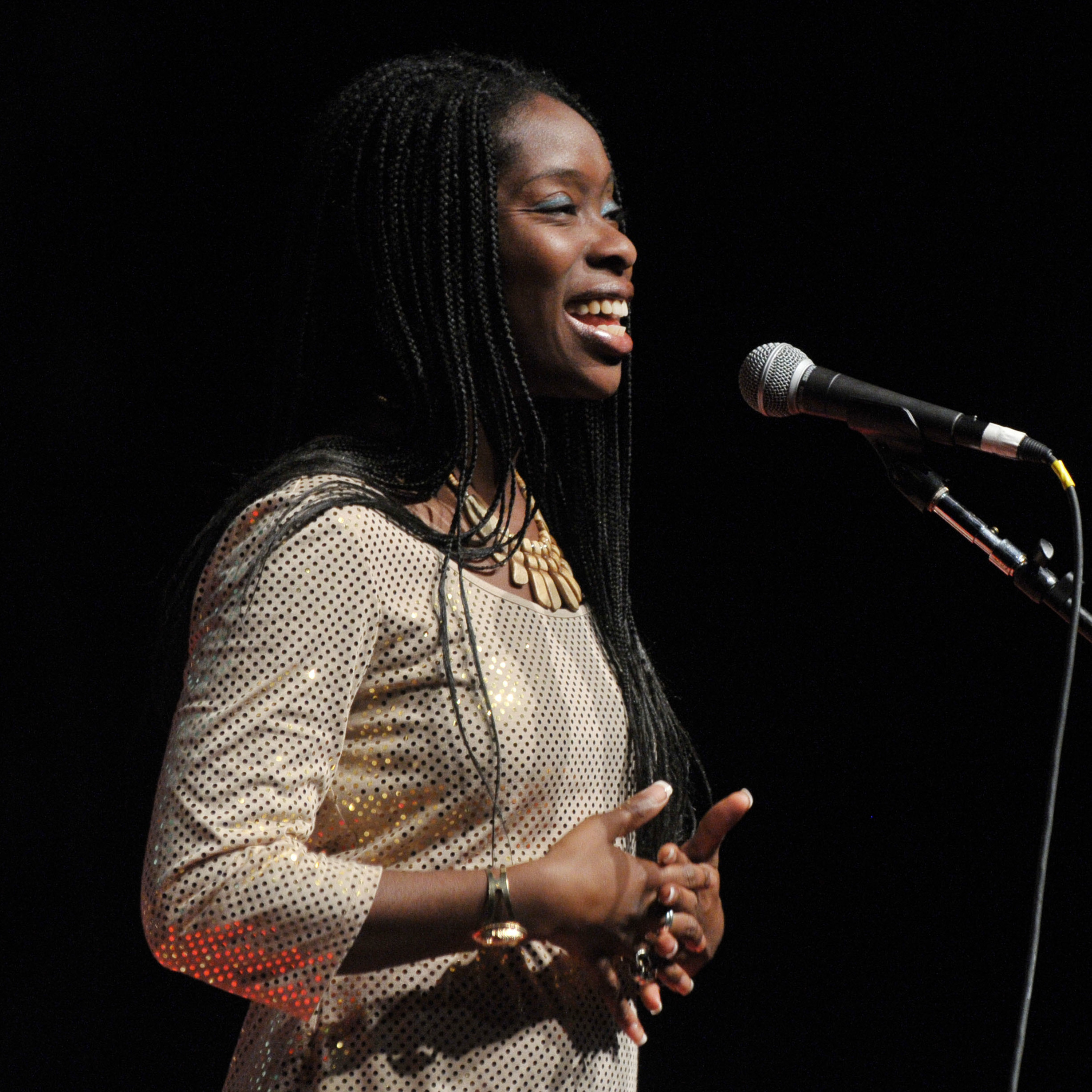

Background information
- Born: Iyeoka Ivie Okoawo; April 28, 1975 (age 51); Boston, Massachusetts, United States
- Genres: Neo soul, R&B, soul, funk, hip hop
- Occupations: Singer-songwriter, poet, educator
- Instruments: Vocals, tambourine
- Years active: 1996–present
- Labels: Underground Sun, Phanai Media Group
- Formerly of: The Rock By Funk Tribe
- Website: iyeoka.com

Iyeoka Okoawo (/iːˈjoʊkə/; born April 28, 1975) is an American singer and poet (of Nigerian heritage), recording artist, singer, activist, educator and TEDGlobal Fellow. Her music includes elements from soul, R&B, rock, hip hop, and jazz.

== Music career ==
Okoawo began her musical career by founding the group The Rock by Funk Tribe, a collective of musicians that enabled her to interweave her poetry with jazz, blues, funk, and gospel. In 2004, she released her first solo full-length album of poem-songs, called Black and Blues, through Phanai Records. Then she began to tour and appeared on other artists’ albums, including The Press Project's Get Right album and Memoirs of the Tempo by Tempo Valley.

In 2008, Iyeoka released her second album of poetry and music fusion, Hum The Bass Line, again on Phanai Records. That same year, Iyeoka made a cover of U2′s hit song "Desire" for a compilation of U2 covers called In The Name Of Love: Africa Celebrates U2. The album featured Grammy Award-winning/nominated African artists, including Angelique Kidjo, Les Nubians, Sierra Leone's Refugee All Stars, Vieux Farka Touré, Vusi Mahlasela and the Soweto Gospel Choir, with proceeds benefiting the Global Fund.

In 2009, Iyeoka decided to transform her sound and songwriting approach and began working with producer David Franz (in collaboration with her original producer, Francis Phan) to create more traditional song forms. Iyeoka released two EPs that year: This Time Around and Run Into the Rain. The new music infused more pop, R&B, dance, and hip hop into the mix, creating an “electronic soul” sound.

In November 2010, Iyeoka released her new album, Say Yes, containing nine songs and two poems, through the Underground Sun artist development company. It is the first “Evolving Album” where purchasers will receive added content for free as the album evolves. Before the album's release, the first song, “The Yellow Brick Road Song”, was featured in an episode of the new hit HBO series How To Make It in America. "The Yellow Brick Road Song" is being used as the theme song for the series "Fairly Legal" that premiered January 20, 2011, on USA Network.

In January 2011, Iyeoka was nominated in The 10th Annual Independent Music Awards for her song "This Time Around" in the R&B Song category.

Iyeoka is currently touring in support of the new album and her poetry. In the past, she has toured in support of artists such as Femi Kuti, Zap Mama and Soulive, as well as played musical festivals, including Bonnaroo. The buzz surrounding her poetry has also garnered her national attention through performances at the TBS Trumpet Awards, the Sullivan Honors Awards at the Kennedy Center and Russell Simmons’ Def Poetry Jam on HBO.

== Poetry and workshops ==
- TEDGlobal Fellow, featured performer at TEDGlobal Session 2010
- Poetry workshops at the Esalen Institute in Big Sur, California
- Cantab Poetry Team
- Boston Slam Team
- Lizard Lounge, Jeff Robinson Trio
- National Poetry Slam circuit for the past ten years, with the Jeff Robinson Trio and as a member of the acclaimed Bull Horn Collective and Blackout Arts Collective.
- Her poem on Rwanda is featured in a documentary film Rwanda Rising that is being executive produced by Andrew Young, the former ambassador to the United Nations.

== Discography ==
=== Studio albums ===
- Black & Blues (2004)
- Hum the Bass Line (2008)
- Say Yes (2010)
- Gold (2016)

=== Live albums ===
- Live @ KTUH Honolulu

== Accolades ==
Year	Organization	Accolade	Artist/work	Ranking	Source
2016	Pop Magazine	Best Albums of 2016	Gold	15	
