= Emtithal Mahmoud =

Sudanese poet and activist

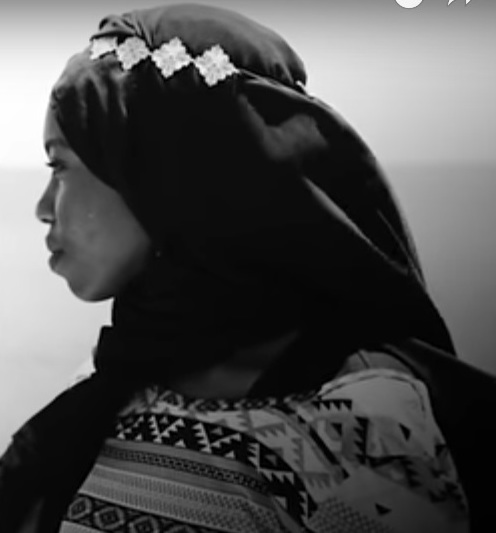
- Born: 1992 or 1993 (age 32–33); Darfur, Sudan
- Education: Yale University
- Awards: Individual World Poetry Slam championship winner (2015) and Women of the World Poetry Slam co-champion (2016)

Emtithal "Emi" Mahmoud (Arabic: إمتثال "إيمي" محمود; born 1992 or 1993 in Darfur, Sudan) is a Sudanese-American poet and activist, who won the 2015 Individual World Poetry Slam championship. In 2018, she became UNHCR Goodwill Ambassador, and in this capacity, has traveled to refugee camps in Kenya, Greece and Jordan, drawing wider attention to the situation of refugees.

== Early life ==
Mahmoud was born in Darfur, Sudan, and moved with her family to Yemen, when she was a toddler. She then moved to the United States in 1998. When she was seven, she returned to Sudan, where her parents took part in a protest after the government stopped paying teachers. She and friends hid under the bed with fear, and this experience impressed on her the value of education.

Her sister is poet and activist Afaq "Foo Foo" Mahmoud.

Mahmoud attended Julia R. Masterman High School in Philadelphia and won a Leonore Annenberg's scholarship, an award that covers all costs for four years at any college in the United States. She then attended Yale University, where she studied anthropology and Molecular Biology and graduated in 2016.

== Poetry ==
Mahmoud first encountered spoken word poetry as an undergraduate at Yale University. She joined ¡Oyé!, a spoken-word group affiliated with the Latino Cultural Center on campus, then the Yale Slam Team. In 2013, she also played the role of a poem reader in a short film called Haleema.

Mahmoud's 2015 award-winning poem was called Mama. This was a tribute to Mahmoud's mother, who was unable to be in the audience that day, as she was in Sudan for the funeral of Mahmoud's grandmother, who had died on the first day of the competition. Mahmoud also dedicated a poem to Alan Kurdi called Boy in the Sand. - In 2018, she published a book of poems called Sisters' Entrance.

== Activism ==
Since high school, Mahmoud has also been an activist, advocating for attention to the continuing violence in Darfur. She was on the BBC's 100 Women list of "The most Inspirational Women across the World" in 2015, and she was invited to a 2016 roundtable with President Obama, when he visited the Islamic Society of Baltimore.

In 2017, Mahmoud took part in the How to Do Good speaker tour, performing poetry and discussing her advocacy work in New York, Oslo, Stockholm, The Hague, Brussels, Paris, London, and York in 2018. Since 2014, Mahmoud has also been advocating for the rights of sickle cell disease patients in Nepal.

In 2016, she was invited to recite one of her poems at the United Nations General Assembly in New York. Also in 2016, she launched a campaign at the 'Laureates and Leaders Summit' in New Delhi. The same year, she gave a talk at the TEDMED conference, and was also opening speaker at a TEDxTalk in Kakuma refugee camp in Kenya in 2018.

== See also ==
- Sudanese literature
- Spoken word poetry
- Amal Kassir
