= Women of the World Poetry Slam =

Annual poetry competition and festival

Womxn of the World Poetry Slam
- Genre: Poetry slam
- Country: United States
- Founded: 2008; 18 years ago
- Website: https://www.wowpsfest.com/

The Women of the World Poetry Slam (WoWPS) (since 2021 known as Womxn of the World Poetry Slam) is an annual international poetry competition and festival. The poetry slam is open to "people 18 years and older who navigate the world as and/or identify as womxn".

== History ==
In 2008, the Women of the World Poetry Slam (WoWPS) was introduced, in which only female and female-identified poets are allowed to compete. WoWPS was the brainchild of Kimberly J. Simms (PSi EC 2005-2007) and Deborah Marsh. The first WoWPS was held in Detroit, Michigan and the first champion was Andrea Gibson.

Each tournament is held in a different city. Candidate cities submit bids and go through a vetting process.

In late 2015, the languaging around inclusion was updated to read: "Competition at WOWps is limited to poets who live their lives as women. Qualified poets include female assigned or identified individuals who are PSi members and are 18+ years of age, including gender non-conforming individuals". However, as of 2020, participants do not need to be PSi members and the name of the competition is now "Womxn of the World Poetry Slam".

In 2018, Poetry Slam, Inc.'s voting body elected to cease its three major 2019 poetry slams including WoWPS. The WoWPS resumed in 2020 with a new official website. The 2024 WoWPS was hosted by the Black Arts District in Baltimore, Maryland. For 2025, the organizers stated that WOWPS would be "taking a break for radical rest and reflection".

== Format ==
The Womxn of the World Poetry Slam is a 4-day international competition and festival.

The tournament has two days of preliminary rounds, in which poets compete in 1, 2, 3, and 4 minute bouts. Poets read a 4-minute (or less) poem in the 1st round. In the 2nd, they read a 1-minute (or less) poem. On the 2nd night of the competition, poets will read against a different slate of poets and most of them will be in a different venue. In the 1st round, they will read a 2-minute (or less) poem. In the 2nd round, they will read a 3 minute (or less) poem. At the conclusion of each mini-bout, the poet will receive a ranking of 1-6 based on placement within competition groups. All poets within a mini bout (usually consisting of 6 poets) perform first round, then all poets in same group perform second round with calibration between rounds.

After the preliminary bouts are completed, the poets with the highest scores and ranks advance to the finals. The poet next in line for Finals is designated the calibration poet. All poems in the finals are 3 -minute (or less) poems, with a 20 second grace period. A single poem performed during preliminary bouts may be repeated on Finals. Finals for the Women of the World Poetry Slam will include the top 10-14 scoring and ranking poets based on the total number of participating poets.

There will be 2 sacrificial/calibration poets before finals begins, from the next two ranks of poets who didn't make finals (for instance, if there are 14 finalists, poets ranked 15 and 16 will be invited to be the sacrificial poets at finals). All finalists will read in the 1st round; the 7 poets with the highest scores move on to the second round. These 7 poets read another poem and the top 4 go to the final round. These 4 poets will each read 1 more poem, and the high score of that round is the Women of the World Poetry Slam Champion. If there is a tie between the top 2 poets, they read 1 more poem in a sudden death match, or they agree to share the title. In a sudden death match, judges indicate which poet they prefer by choosing one poet or the other (no scores) and the champion is crowned.

== Tournament results by year ==
| Year | Winner | Runners up | Number of Competitors | Host city |
|---|---|---|---|---|
| 2024 | Chelsea Guevara | (2) Sumbodies Mama (3) Keyma (4) Rain (5) Lechell The Schootah (6) TIE - Mecca & Asma (8) Kweli Imani (9) Laney Thee Poet (10) TIE- Shasparay & Gabby Elvessie (12) Lyrical Faith (13) TIE - Liv & A'niya Taylor (15) Stella B. (16) Nova (17) Maya Write (18) Lisa Shen (19) Angelique Palmer (20) Lindsay Mayhew | 93 | Baltimore, MD |
| 2023 | Ayanna Florence | (2) Aris Kian (3) Brittany Barker (4) Alex Tha Great (5) Alexis Wolfe (6) The Bee (7) Bri Esoteric (8) 2ChillPhyl (9) Liv (10) Obsidian (11) Karmel Poet (12) D. Colin | 72 | Baltimore, MD |
| 2022 | RADI | (2) LeChell "The Shootah" (3) Keyma Flight (4) Shasparay (5) Destined (6) Meccamorphosis (7) Carlynn Newhouse (8) Liv (9) Casandra IsFree (10) Free. K | 64 | Baltimore, MD |
| 2021 | TIE - Ayanna Albertson & Lady Brion | (3) LeChell "The Shootah" (4) Meccamorphsis (5) Maya Wright (6) BLACQWILDFLOWR (7) Free. K (9) Thursdays Angel | 72 | Dallas, TX |
| 2020 | Imani Cezanne | (2) Ayanna Albertson (3) Lady Brion (4) Carlynn Newhouse (5) Chima (6) Liv McKee (7) TIE - Tianna Bratcher & Rubi (9) LeChell “The Shootah” (10) TIE - Clarity Levine & Aris Kian (12) AP (13) Bee Tha Poet (14) Ashlee Connors | 84 | Dallas, TX |
| 2019 | (not held) | | | |
| 2018 | FreeQuency | (2) iCon (3) RADI (4) Mia S. Willis (5) Melania Luisa (6) TIE - Glori B. & Ashley Lumpkin (8) Muna Abdulahi (9) Meccamorphosis (10) Angelica Maria (11) Imani Cezanne (12) TIE - Jazmyne Smith & Mercedez Holtry (14) Ariana Brown | 96 | Dallas, TX |
| 2017 | TIE - Ebony Stewart & Oompa | (3) Ashley August (4) Jasmin Roberts (5) TIE - Shyla Hardwick & Ifrah Hussein (7) Roya Marsh (8) Barbara Fant (9) Alex Tha Great (10) GiGi Bella (11) TIE - Shae & Jane Belinda & Natasha Hooper & Eccentrich | 96 | Dallas, TX |
| 2016 | TIE - Imani Cezanne & Emi Mahmoud | (3) iCon (4) Honey Sanaa (5) Shasparay Lighteard (6) Taylor Steele (7) Rheonna Thornton (8) Elizabeth Acevedo (9) TIE - Crystal Valentine & Confidence & Tanesha Nicole (12) Chrysanthemum Tran | 96 | Brooklyn, NY |
| 2015 | Janae Johnson | (2) Roya Marsh (3) TIE - Mercedez Holtry & Desiree Dallagiacomo (5) TIE - Taylor Steele & Angelique Palmer & Samira Obeid (8) Confidence Omenai (9) Samantha Peterson (10) FreeQuency (11) Miss Haze (12) Kwene | 72 | Albuquerque, NM |
| 2014 | Dominique Ashaheed | (2) Imani Cezanne (3) Denice Frohman (4) Carrie Rudzinski (5) Janae Johnson (6) Venessa Marco (7) Melissa May (8) Candace Liger (9) Megan Falley (10) Giddy (11) elizag (12) Erin Claridy | 72 | Austin, TX |
| 2013 | Denice Frohman | (2) Dominique Ashaheed (3) Falu (4) Porsha Olayiwola (5) Denise Jolly (6) Theresa Davis (7) Eris Zion Venia (8) TIE - T. Miller & Sierra DeMulder & Suzi Q. Smith (11) Meg Waldron (12) Laura Lamb Brown-Lavoie | 72 | Minneapolis, MN |
| 2012 | Dominique Ashaheed | (2) Porsha Olayiwola (3) Kait Rokowski (4) Joanna Hoffman (5) Lauren Zuniga (6) TIE - Olivia Gatwood & Whitney Greenway (8) Melissa May (9) Miss Haze (10) Krista Mosca (11) Kay Kron (12) DeAnn Emett | 72 | Denver, CO |
| 2011 | Theresa Davis | (2) Gypsee Yo (3) Suzi Q Smith (4) Rachel Wiley (5) T. Miller (6) Safia Elhillo (7) Lacey Roop (8) Franny Choi (9) Joanna Hoffman (10) Tova Charles (11) Mahogany L. Browne (12) Jerrica Escoto | 72 | Columbus, OH |
| 2010 | Eboni Hogan | (2) Airea "Dee" Matthews (3) Chauncey Beaty (4) Laura Yes Yes (5) Ms. Wise (6) Megan Rickman (7) Original Woman (8) Tristan Silverman (9) Nicole Homer (10) Gypsee Yo (11) Sierra DeMulder (12) Hannah | 72 | Columbus, OH |
| 2009 | Rachel McKibbens | (2) Gypsee Yo (3) Dee Mathews (4) Ocean (5) T. Miller (6) TIE - Bethsheba & Chauncey Beaty (8) The Original Woman (9) Theresa Davis (10) TIE - Faylita Hicks & Taaj Freeman (12) Red Summer | 71 | Detroit, MI |
| 2008 | Andrea Gibson | (2) Isis (3) T. Miller (4) Nicole Homer (5) Sonya Renee (6) Tara Hardy (7) Karyna McGlynn (8) Original Woman (9) Christena B. (10) Ami Mattison (11) D.E.E.P. (12) Ms. Wise | 70 | Detroit, MI |

== See also ==
- Individual World Poetry Slam
- List of performance poets
- National Poetry Slam
- Oral poetry
- Performance poetry
- Spoken word
