= Sonya Renee Taylor =

American activist

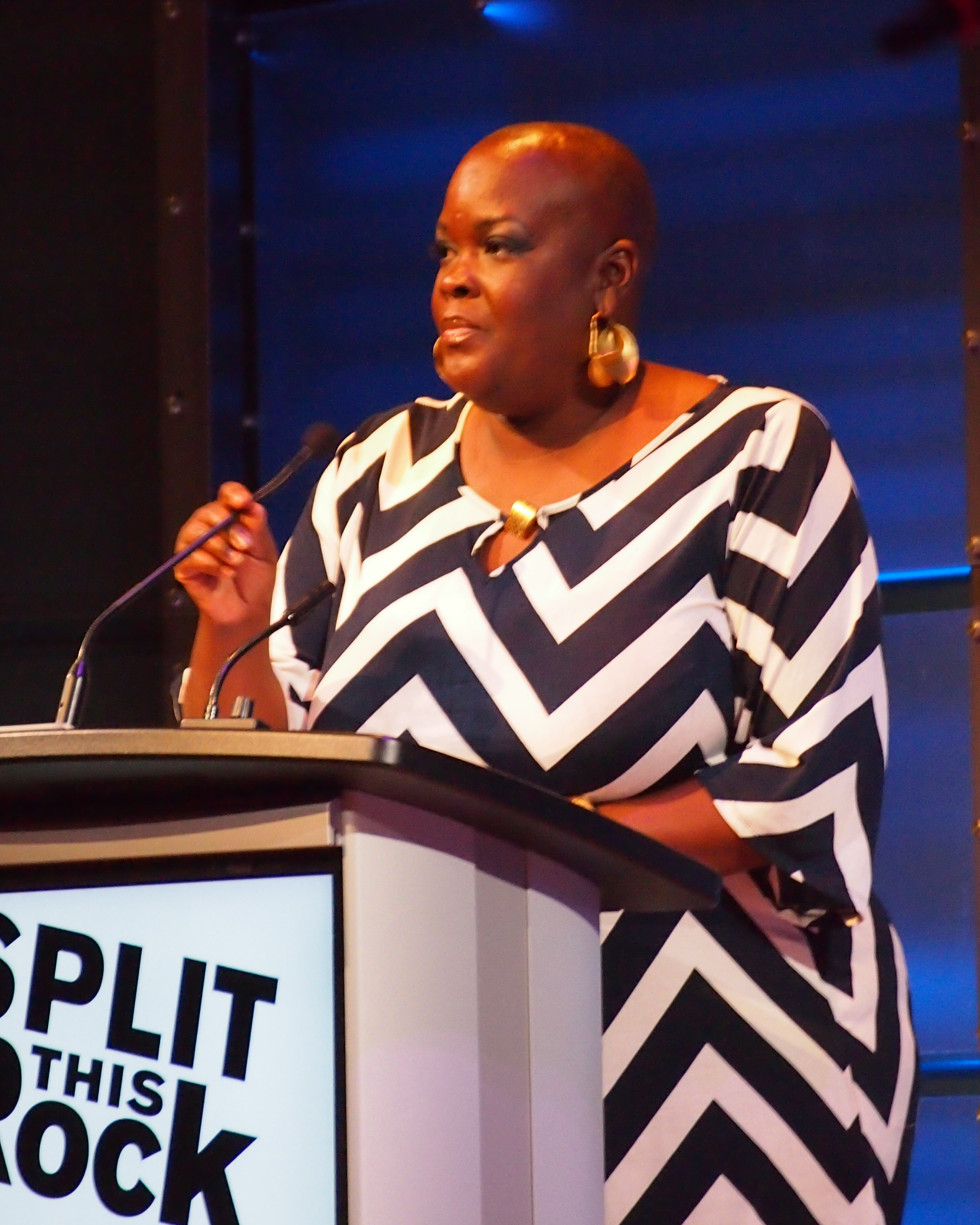
- Occupations: Author, thought leader, speaker, educator, spoken word artist
- Writing career
- Genre: Poetry
- Notable work: The Body Is Not An Apology
- Notable awards: Edmund Hillary Fellow (2017–20) National Individual Poetry Slam Championship (2004)
- Website: sonyareneetaylor.com

Sonya Renee Taylor is a New York Times best-selling author, activist, thought leader, spoken word artist, and founder of The Body is Not An Apology global movement. Taylor's work focuses on body liberation, racial justice, and transformational change using her framework of radical self-love. The author of seven books, Taylor's other projects include the popular "What's Up, Y'all?" video series and the reparations-inspired Buy Back Black Debt initiative, which in October 2020 cleared over half a million dollars in Black-held debt. She is a Black queer woman who also holds the identities fat, cisgender, and neurodivergent.

== Education ==
Taylor holds a B.A. in Sociology from Hampton University and an M.S.A. in Organizational Management from Trinity Washington University.

== The Body Is Not An Apology ==
Active from 2012 to 2023, first as a Facebook page and then as a website, digital article library, and book, this movement fostered a "global, radical, unapologetic self love which translates to radical human love and action in service toward a more just, equitable and compassionate world". It strove to reduce violence against people who have been marginalized and have had violence perpetuated against them, including

"racist violence including lynching, slavery, holocausts, and internment camps... LGBTQIA people being assaulted, murdered and driven to suicide regularly... rape and sexual assault... the bombing of abortion clinics and the murder of physicians supporting women's rights to autonomy over their own bodies... involuntary sterilization of people with disabilities... [and] debilitating shame that people around the world live with as a result of the psychological attacks our social and media machines wage against us, ending in bulimia and anorexia, addiction, stigma, racism, homophobia, ableism, sizeism, ageism, transphobia, mass self-hatred, and senseless violence as a result of body hatred."

In her 2018 book The Body Is Not an Apology: The Power of Radical Self-Love, Taylor uses the framework of the Three Peaces to advocate for liberation from body shame. The Three Peaces are Peace with Not Understanding, Peace with Difference, and Peace with Your Body. Taylor argues that the work of radical self-love is to remember our innate worthiness and divinity we possessed at birth before systems of oppression stripped that knowledge from us and replaced it with body shame and self-hatred. She writes, "I have never seen a toddler lament the size of their thighs or the squishiness of their bellies. Children do not arrive here ashamed of their race, gender, age, or disabilities. Have you ever seen an infant realize they have feet? Talk about wonder! That is what an unobstructed relationship with our bodies looks like."

== Slam poetry career ==
In her career as a spoken word artist, Taylor won multiple National and International poetry slams, including the 2004 U.S. National Individual Poetry Slam competition, the 2005 DC/Baltimore Grand Slam competition, the 2007 Ill List III Slam competition, and the 2006 Four Continents International Slam competition. Her global reach has included performances for audiences across the US, New Zealand, Australia, England, Scotland, Sweden, Canada, and the Netherlands. Taylor’s venues for poetry performance have included prisons, mental health treatment facilities, homeless shelters, universities, festivals, and public schools across the globe.

== Contributions to body liberation movements ==
Taylor has written about the intersections of race, gender, and sexuality as they pertain to the concept of body positivity, critiquing the mainstreaming of the body positivity movement and claiming space for those who have been noticeably left out of the conversation. She writes:

"Our society tells us fatness is not beautiful. Blackness is not beautiful. So even while reclaiming size diversity as beautiful, the presence of Blackness complicates the narrative... [i]t is this unwillingness to wade through the murky waters of race that make Black and Brown women invisible even in the places where we say we are trying to make people seen."

== Works ==
In 2010, Taylor released her first book, A Little Truth on Your Shirt, a collection of her poetry that has been described as challenging, asking the reader hard questions. She was included in several different anthologies, including Elephant Engine High Dive Revival, Junkyard Ghost Revival Anthology, Just Like a Girl: A Manifesta, Spoken Word Revolution Redux, and Growing Up Girl: An Anthology of Voices from Marginalized Spaces. Taylor was also featured in various journals and magazines including Domain Magazine, Reality Magazine, Off Our Backs, The City Morgue, and X Magazine. She has made appearances on networks like CBS News, MTV, BET, TVOne, Oxygen Network, CNN, PBS, and NPR as well as on HBO's Def Poetry Jam.

In 2018, Taylor published The Body is Not an Apology: The Power of Radical Self-Love. In February 2021, the second edition of the book became a New York Times best-seller, placing at #6 in the Advice, How-To & Miscellaneous category.

In 2021, Taylor edited The Routledge International Handbook of Fat Studies, alongside Cat Pausé.

In 2022, as part of the launch for their 12-week global Institute for Radical Permission, Taylor authored The Journal of Radical Permission with fellow author and poet adrienne maree brown.

Taylor's most recent book, The Book of Radical Answers, an advice book for children, was published by Penguin Random House in October 2023.
