= Poetry Slam, Inc. =

Slam poetry competitions of American

- Nickname: PSi
- Formation: 1997
- Type: Nonprofit
- Purpose: Poetry slams, spoken word
- Location: United States
- Official language: English

Poetry Slam, Inc. (PSi) is a non-profit organization that runs three poetry slams: the National Poetry Slam (NPS), the Individual World Poetry Slam (iWPS), and the Women of the World Poetry Slam (WoWps). Poetry Slam, Inc. was established in 1997 to oversee and enforce the rules of the National Poetry Slam. Their mission is "to promote the performance and creation of poetry while cultivating literary activities and spoken word events in order to build audience participation, stimulate creativity, awaken minds, foster education, inspire mentoring, encourage artistic statement and engage communities worldwide in the revelry of language".

== History ==
Poetry Slam, Inc. was established on August 9, 1997 to oversee and enforce the rules of the National Poetry Slam, which had been in existence since 1990. On November 9, 1999, PSi became an Illinois Charitable Trust, and was granted tax-exempt status days later.

The goals set by the Amended Articles of Incorporation include educational and literary purposes such as:

- «Advocate, promote, support, witness, and/or perpetuate the art of performance poetry»,
- «Enhance the perception of literary merit and legitimacy of performance poetry as an art form»,
- «Protect the artistic and financial interests of the National Poetry Slam community».

PSi created a website and held a summer workshop at SUNY-Oneonta. It staged slams on a major cable television network and organized annual regional competitions in numerous host cities converging the more talented participants on the annual National Poetry Slam.

Poetry slams are maintained in a number of cities by local volunteer organizers.

Poetry Slam, Inc.'s voting body elected in 2018 to cease its three major 2019 poetry slams. The Womxn of the World Poetry Slam resumed in 2020 with a new official website and management team.

== Organizational structure ==
PSi's Executive Council is headed by a seven-member board of poets and slam organizers, elected by representatives of local slams (SlamMasters) every two years. It maintains a certification process for poetry slam series and holds annual organizational meetings.
