= Denice Frohman =

American poet, writer, performer, educator

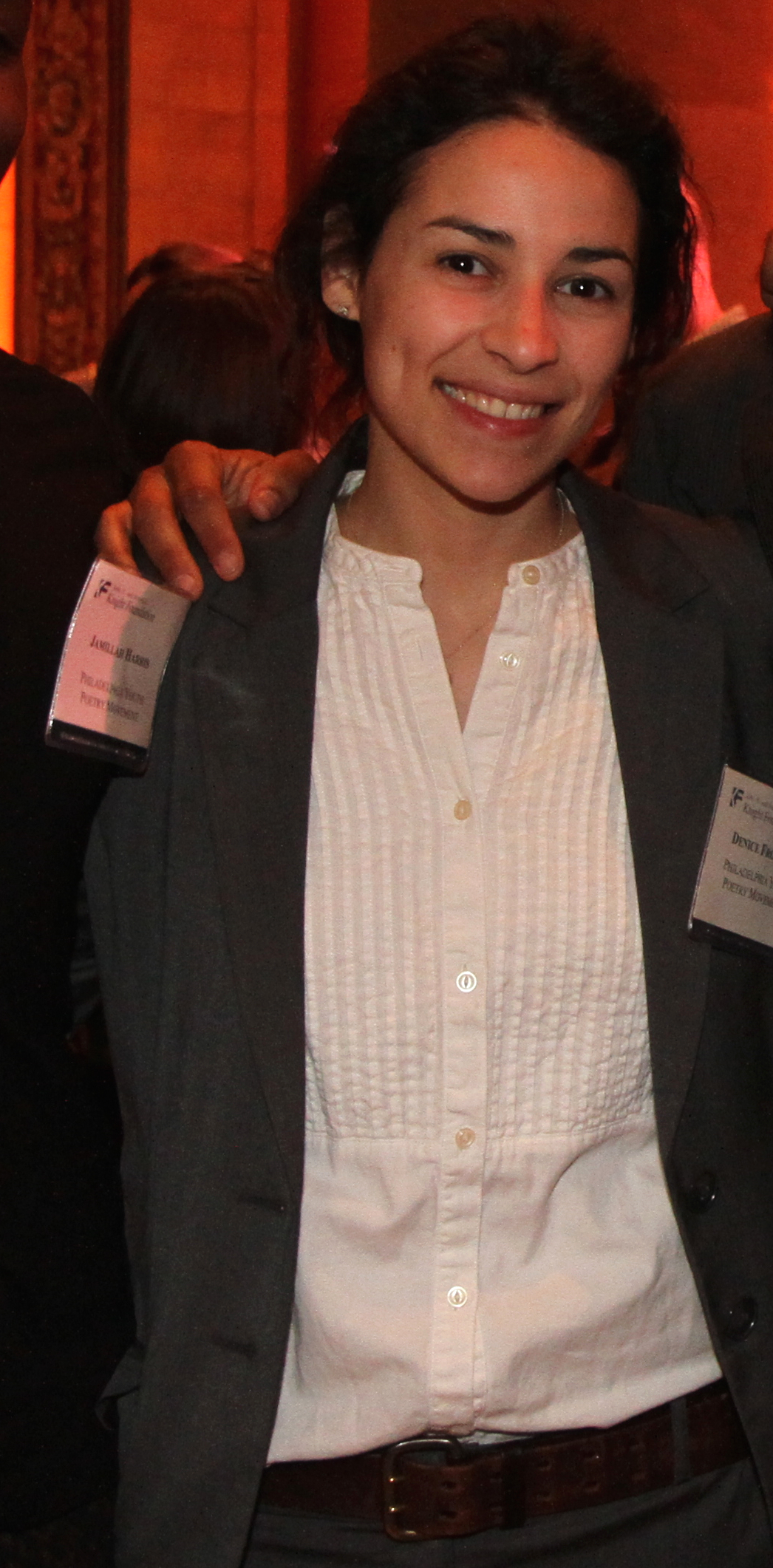
Denice Frohman'

Denice Frohman is a poet, writer, performer and educator, whose work explores the intersections of race, gender, and sexuality. Frohman uses her experience as a queer woman from a multi-cultural (Puerto Rican and Jewish) background in her writing. By addressing identity, her work encourages communities to challenge the dominant social constructs and oppressive narratives in place that are currently working against concepts of unity and equity. Her message is about claiming the power to be who you are. She was born and raised in New York City, and earned her master's degree in education from Drexel University.

== Awards and partnerships ==
Denice Frohman won the 2013 Women of the World Poetry Slam Championship. Denice is also a 2014 CantoMundo Fellow, 2014 National Association of Latino Arts & Cultures Fund for the Arts grant recipient, 2013 Hispanic Choice Award recipient for "Creative Artist of the Year," 2013 Southern Fried Poetry Slam Champion, and 2012 Leeway Transformation Award recipient. Frohman was partnered with fellow Women of the World Champion for 2014 and 2012 Dominique Christina as an award-winning spoken word duo, Sister Outsider. The two toured nationally, appearing at schools such as Boston University and conferences such as College Union Poetry Slam Invitational. In 2026, she was a recipient of the Torchbearer "Carrying Change" Awards' Illuminator Award.

== Career ==
Frohman's work has been commissioned by ESPN, Philadelphia's citywide "UnLitter Us" Campaign and GALAEI (Gay and Lesbian Latino Aids Education Initiative). Videos of her performances have appeared in the Huffington Post, BuzzFeed, Upworthy, YouTube, and literary publications such as Narrative Northeast. Frohman's poem "Accents" serves as a reminder of the beauty of all accents. She has performed and taught poetry across the country and internationally. In 2016, she performed at the White House. She has been interviewed by CNN, and Philadelphia Weekly, among other news sources.

== See also ==
- Ahead of the Curve
