= Javon Johnson =

American spoken word poet, writer, and professor

- Born: Los Angeles, California, U.S.
- Occupations: Poet, writer, professor
- Title: Assistant Professor and Director of African American and African Diaspora Studies

Academic background
- Education: California State University, Los Angeles
- Alma mater: Northwestern University
- Thesis: My Words Dance: Doing Race, Gender, and Sexuality in Slam and Spoken Word Poetry Communities in Los Angeles and Chicago (2010)

Academic work
- Discipline: Performance studies
- Institutions: University of Southern California; San Francisco State University; University of Nevada, Las Vegas
- Main interests: Slam poetry
- Notable works: Killing Poetry: Blackness and the Making of Slam and Spoken Word Communities

Javon Johnson is an American spoken word poet, writer, and professor. He is the director of African American and African Diaspora Studies in the Department of Interdisciplinary, Gender, and Ethnic Studies at the University of Nevada, Las Vegas, and the author of Killing Poetry: Blackness and the Making of Slam and Spoken Word Communities.

== Early life and education ==
Johnson was born and raised in Los Angeles. In high school he read the works of Amiri Baraka and Langston Hughes, which inspired him to write poetry. While in college at California State University, Los Angeles, Johnson won first place in Drama Interpretation at the 2002 American Forensic Association National Individual Events Tournament. He completed his doctorate in Performance Studies from Northwestern University with a dissertation on "race, gender, and sexuality in slam and spoken word poetry communities".

== Career ==
Johnson has appeared on HBO's Def Poetry Jam, BET's Lyric Café, TVOne's Verses & Flow, The Arsenio Hall Show, and The Steve Harvey Show. He also co-wrote the Showtime documentary Crossover. He was on the Da Poetry Lounge slam team that performed in the National Poetry Slam in 2003, 2004, 2005, 2007, 2008, 2011, 2012, and 2013, winning the NPS championship in 2003 and 2004. At a 2012 performance at Literary Death Match in Los Angeles, Henry Rollins criticized Johnson's poetry as "basically built for performance". That same year Johnson performed at the Stockton Plea for Peace Center with four fellow poets under the name "Blackson 5". He also contributed essays on race and popular media to the Huffington Post's blog platform. In 2015, Johnson performed at the Fourth of July celebration at Grand Park in Los Angeles. As a member of San Diego PoetrySLAM in 2017, Johnson again took first place at the National Poetry Slam.

After finishing his doctorate, Johnson worked as a USC Visions and Voices postdoctoral fellow in the Department of American Studies and Ethnicity at the University of Southern California. Johnson then spent four years as an assistant professor of communication studies at San Francisco State University before becoming the director of African American and African Diaspora Studies in the Department of Interdisciplinary, Gender, and Ethnic Studies at the University of Nevada, Las Vegas. His academic research examines poetry communities in Los Angeles, contrasting their democratic possibilities against the experience of struggle and privilege. In 2017, Rutgers University Press published his book Killing Poetry: Blackness and the Making of Slam and Spoken Word Communities, and in 2018 he co-edited the poetry collection End of Chiraq: A Literary Mixtape, which was published by Northwestern University Press. He adapted his poem "Cuz He's Black" into the short film "Voicemails to Myself Vol. 1", released in 2022.

== Bibliography ==
- "Manning Up: Race, Gender, and Sexuality in Los Angeles' Slam and Spoken Word Poetry Communities", Text and Performance Quarterly, 2010.
- Killing Poetry: Blackness and the Making of Slam and Spoken Word Communities (Rutgers University Press, 2017) ISBN 9780813580029
- The End of Chiraq: A Literary Mixtape (Northwestern University Press, 2018) ISBN 9780810137189

== Selected performances ==
- "Cuz He's Black", 2013 National Poetry Slam
- "Last Conversation Between Malcolm X and His Daughter", 2014 National Poetry Slam
- "Debt", 2017 Button Poetry Live
- "Black and Happy", 2017 Button Poetry Live
