= National Poetry Slam =

American poetry competition

- Nickname: NPS
- Status: Defunct
- Frequency: Annually
- Country: United States; Canada; Europe; Australia
- Inaugurated: 1990
- Most recent: 2018
- Major events: Poetry slam

The National Poetry Slam (NPS) was a performance poetry competition where teams from across the United States, Canada, and, occasionally, Europe and Australia, participate in a large-scale poetry slam. The event occurred in early August every year and in different U.S. cities. The last National Poetry Slam took place in 2018 in Chicago, Illinois.

== History ==
The first National Poetry Slam was held at Fort Mason in 1990 in San Francisco. It was organized by poet Gary Mex Glazner and featured three competing teams: Chicago (birthplace of slam), New York City (Nuyorican), and San Francisco (host city). It was held every year from 1990 until 2018.

From 1990 to 2007, the National Poetry Slam held an individual poetry competition (known as "indies") simultaneously with the team competition, with the poets earning the highest ranking individual poems during the first two days of competition moving on the semifinal and final rounds. The first winner of this event was Patricia Smith, who would go on to win the Individual National Poetry Slam Championship title a record four times.

Starting in 2004, Poetry Slam Inc. (PSI) began hosting a separate event called the Individual World Poetry Slam (IWPS), in which solo poets, rather than teams, competed for the championship title. Because of the popularity of iWPS and to avoid the confusion of two "individual" poetry slam titles being awarded ever year, Poetry Slam Inc. decided to cancel the "indie" competition at the National Poetry Slam.

In 2008, the "Indie Finals" was replaced with the "Group Piece Finals," in which the teams with the highest ranking group pieces (multi-voice poems featuring more than one poet) competed for the title. Only teams who weren't already eligible for NPS semifinals were allowed to compete, with New York, NYC-Urbana being the first Group Piece Finals championship team.

Also in 2008, the Women of the World Poetry Slam (WOWPS) was introduced, in which only female and female-identified poets are allowed to compete. The first WOWPS was held in Detroit, Michigan and the first WOWPS champion was Andrea Gibson.

In 2008, poet Harlym 125 created an unofficial individual competition called the National Underground Poetry Individual Competition (NUPIC) as a response to the absence of an individual competition at NPS. The winner of this competition has traditionally been given a showcase spot on the finals stage at NPS.

The National Poetry Slam has also been the subject of several feature-length documentaries, including the 1998 Paul Devlin film SlamNation, and the 2006 Kyle Fuller and Mike Henry film Slam Planet.

== Results by year ==
=== Team Finalists ===
Year	Winner	Runners up	Number of Competing Teams	Host city
2018	Charlotte, SlamCharlotte	(2) Da Poetry Lounge Slam Team (3) Slammageddon Baltimore (4) Salt City Unified	72	Chicago, Illinois
2017	San Diego PoetrySLAM	(2) Brooklyn Poetry Slam (3) The House Slam (Boston) (4) Da Poetry Lounge Slam Team	84	Denver, Colorado
2016	Slammageddon Baltimore	(2) San Diego PoetrySLAM (3) The House Slam (Boston) (4) Austin NeoSoul	72	Decatur, Georgia
2015	The House Slam	(2) Hawaii Slam (3) Berkeley Slam (4) Denver Mercury Poetry Slam	72	Oakland, California
2014	D.C. Beltway Poetry Slam	(2) New York, NYC-Urbana (3) Slam New Orleans (4) Denver, Slam Nuba	72	Oakland, California
2013	Slam New Orleans	(2) Hollywood (Da Poetry Lounge) (3) New York, Nuyorican Poets Cafe (4) Elevated! San Diego	70	Boston
2012	Slam New Orleans	(2) Killeen, Texas (3) New York, Nuyorican Poets Cafe (4) Hollywood (Da Poetry Lounge)	72	Charlotte, North Carolina
2011	Denver, Slam Nuba	(2) New York, Nuyorican Poets Cafe (3) Providence Poetry Slam (4) Columbus, Ohio Writing Wrongs	76	Boston
2010	St. Paul, Soapboxing	(2) New York, Nuyorican Poets Cafe (3) Durham, North Carolina Bull City Slam Team (4) Austin, Neo Soul	78	St. Paul, Minnesota
2009	St. Paul, Soapboxing	(2) Albuquerque, ABQ Slams (3) San Francisco (4) New York, Nuyorican Poets Cafe	68	West Palm Beach, Florida
2008	Charlotte, SlamCharlotte	(2) New York, louderARTS (3) Austin (4) Boston, Cantab	75	Madison, Wisconsin
2007	Charlotte, SlamCharlotte	(2) Killeen, TX Rhyme or Die (3) New York, louderARTS (4) Denver, Slam Nuba (5) New York, Nuyorican Poets Cafe	76	Austin, Texas
2006	Denver	(2) Austin, Southflavas (3) New York, louderARTS (4) DC-Baltimore (5) Miami	75	Austin, TX
2005	Albuquerque, ABQ Slams	(2) Charlotte, Slam Charlotte (3) Fort Worth (3) Hollywood (Da Poetry Lounge)	75	Albuquerque, New Mexico
2004	Hollywood (Da Poetry Lounge)	(2) Denver (3) Dallas (4) Berkeley	69	St. Louis, Missouri
2003	Los Angeles	(2) New York, Nuyorican Poets Cafe (3) Austin (4) Oakland	63	Chicago
2002	New York, NYC-Urbana/ Detroit (Tie)	(3) New York, Nuyorican Poets Cafe (4) Seattle	54	Minneapolis
2001	Dallas	(2) Los Angeles (3) Seattle (4) New York, NYC-Urbana	56	Seattle
2000	New York, NYC-Urbana	(2) San Antonio (3) New York, Nuyorican Poets Cafe (4) New York, louderARTS	56	Providence, Rhode Island
1999	San Francisco & San Jose (Tie)	(3) New York, louderARTS (4) Oakland	48	Chicago
1998	New York, Nuyorican Poets Cafe	(2) Dallas (3) Los Angeles (4) Cleveland	45	Austin
1997	New York, Mouth Almighty	(2) Chicago, Green Mill (3) Cleveland (4) Worcester	33	Middletown, Connecticut
1996	Providence	(2) Berwyn (3) New York, Nuyorican Poets Cafe (4) Austin	27	Portland, Oregon
1995	Asheville	(2) Cleveland (3) Boston (4) Maine	27	Ann Arbor, Michigan
1994	Cleveland	(2) Boston (3) New York, Nuyorican Poets Cafe (4) Asheville	24	Asheville, North Carolina
1993	Boston	(2) New York, Nuyorican Poets Cafe (3) Cambridge (4) Cleveland	23	San Francisco
1992	Boston	(2) San Francisco (3) Ann Arbor	17	Boston
1991	Chicago, Green Mill	(2) New York, Nuyorican Poets Cafe (3) San Francisco (4) Boston	8	Chicago
1990	Chicago, Green Mill	(2) San Francisco (3) New York, Nuyorican Poets Cafe	3	San Francisco

==== Individual Finalists at NPS ====
Year	Winner	Runners up
2007*; *Final year Indies held	Danny Sherrard	(2) Christopher Michael (3) Shannon Leigh (4) Alvin Lau (Other finalists: Kealoha, Michael Guinn, 6 is 9, Ed Mabrey, Oz, Robbie Q. Telfer)
2006	Anis Mojgani	(2) Alvin Lau (3) Jon Goode (4) Lee Knight Jr. (Other finalists: Erin Jackson (poet), Jamie Kilstein, Amy Weaver, Iyeoka Okoawo, Falu, Travis Watkins)
2005	Janean Livingston; Anis Mojgani (tie)	(3) Ragan Fox (4) Christa Bell (Other finalists: Jamie Kennedy, Eric Darby, Xero Skidmore)
2004	Sonya Renee	(2) Jaylee Alde (3) Shane Koyczan (4) Andrea Gibson (5) Chunky (6) Kimberley Brazwell (7) Rives, Alvin Lau, Janean Livingston
2003	Mighty Mike McGee	(2) Shane Koyczan (3) Delisle (4) Soul Evans (5) Omari (6) Suzy La Follette (7) Corina Delgado (8) Anis Mojgani (9) Da Shade (10) Jive Poetic
2002	Sekou tha Misfit	(2) Corbet Dean (3) Kamal Symonette-Dixon (4) Xero Skidmore (5) Rives (6) Gina Loring (7) Shane Koyczan (8) Joel Chmara
2001	Mayda del Valle	(2) Beau Sia (3) Shawn V. (4) Morris Stegosaurus (5) Angela Boyce (6) Mama Blue
2000	Shane Koyczan	(2) Bryonn Bain (3) Al Letson (4) Iyeoka Okoawo (5) Michael Cirelli (6) Bao Thien Buc Phi
1999	Roger Bonair-Agard	(2) Regie Gibson (3) Gayle Danley (4) Jason Carney (5) Ray McNiece (6) Shane Koyczan
1998	Reggie Gibson	(2) Derrick C. Brown (3) Brian Comiskey (4) Sara Holbrook (5) Cass King (6) Patricia Johnson
1997	Da Boogie Man	(2) DJ Renegade (3) Glenis Redmond (4) Evert Eden (5) Jerry Quickley (6) Monica Copeland
1996	Patricia Johnson	(2) Evert Eden (3) Taylor Mali (4) DJ Renegade (5) Wammo (6) Glenis Redmond
1995	Patricia Smith	(2) Wammo (3) Da Boogie Man (4) ? (5) DJ Renegade (6) Taylor Mali
1994	Gayle Danley	(2) Carl Hancock-Rux (3) Regie Cabico (4) Derick Prosper (5) DJ Renegade (6) Daniel Gray-Kontar
1993	Patricia Smith	(2)Lisa Buscani (3) The Invisible Man aka Azeem (rapper)
1992	Lisa Buscani	(2) Patricia Smith (3) Dana Bryant
1991	Patricia Smith	(2) Lisa Buscani (3) Michael Brown
1990	Patricia Smith	(2) Paul Beatty

==== Group Piece Finalists at NPS ====
Year	Winner	Runners up
2018	Art Amok	(2) Austin Poetry Slam (3) The Retort United (The Drunken Retort) (4) The Fuze Poetry Slam (5) Jersey City Slam (6) Orlando Poetry Slam (7) Boise Poetry Slam (8) St. Louis Poetry Slam (9) Nitty Gritty Slam (10) For The Win (11) Slam Free or Die
2017	Dada Poetry Slam	(2) Slam Charlotte Poetry Slam (3) PuroSlam (4) Eclectic Truth (5) Salt City Slam (6) The Writers Den (7) Boise Poetry Slam (8) Steel City Slam / ABQ Slams (tie) (10) Toronto Poetry Slam (11) Boston Poetry Slam (12) Ktown Mic Drop Slam (13) Rain City Slam
2016	ABQ Slams	(2) Dada Poetry Slam (3) Burlington Ontario (4) Northampton Poetry (5) Freshwater Wordsmiths (6) OM Center Poetry Slam (7) Alchemy Slam (8) Union Square Slam (9) Nuyorican Poets Café (10) Hear Here / Houston Poetry Slam / Puro Slam (tie)
2015	Austin Poetry Slam	(2) Palo Alto (3) Austin Neo Soul (4) Slam Charlotte (5) Atlanta Art Amok (6) Rain City (7) Lizard Lounge Poetry Slam (8) Fort Worth (9) Portland Poetry Slam (10) Seattle Poetry Slam
2014	Hear, Hear! Poetry Slam	(2) Austin Neo Soul (3) WU Slam (St. Louis) (4) Philly Pigeon (5) Palo Alto (6) Verbal Slap (7) Lethal Poetry (Chicago) (8) Denver Mercury (9) Battle Born (Las Vegas) (10) Boise Poetry Slam
2013	Austin Neo Soul / Intangible Slam (tie)	(3) Java Monkey / Houston VIP (tie) (5) Hear Here (Colorado Springs) (6) Battle Born (Las Vegas) (7) Seattle Poetry Slam (Seattle) (8) Dallas Poetry Slam (Dallas) (9) Salt City Slam (Salt Lake City) (10) Sedona Poetry Slam (Sedona, Arizona)
2012	Austin Neo Soul	(2) Bull City Slam (3) ABQ Slams (4) Dallas Poetry Slam (5) Piedmont Poetry Slam (6) Burlington Slam Project (7) Jersey City Poetry Slam (8) Loser Slam (9) Vancouver Poetry Slam (10) Urbana
2011	ABQ Slams	(Other finalists: Austin Poetry Slam, The Intangible Slam (New York City), Dallas Poetry Slam, Elevated! (San Diego), Houston Poetry Slam, Knoxville Poetry Slam, Austin Neo Soul, Houston VIP, and Eclectic Truth (Baton Rouge))
2010	Slam New Orleans	(Other finalists: Pomona, Santa Cruz, Oakland, Vancouver, Minneapolis, Fort Worth, Ocotillo, Seattle, Urbana, and Toronto)
2009	Berkeley Poetry Slam	(2) Seattle Poetry Slam (Other finalists: Fort Worth Poetry Slam, West Palm Beach - The Stage, Atlanta - Art Amok, California- Life Sentence Slam, New Jersey - Loser Slam, Toronto Poetry Slam, Salt Lake City - Salt City Slam, and Amarillo - Slamarillo)
2008	NYC-Urbana	(2) Slam Nahuatl Richmond VA (3) Killeen Texas (4) Cleveland (Other finalists: Atlanta, Philadelphia, Charlotte, Honolulu, Chicago-Green Mill, Phoenix, Lincroft, Seattle, and Fort Worth)

==== National Underground Poetry Individual Competition (NUPIC) Champion ====
Year	Winner	Runner up
2018	(TIE); Lindsay Young; Gabriel Ramirez	
2017	Raych Jackson	Black Chakra
2016	Roya Marsh	Ashley Davis
2015	Will Giles	Imani Cezanne
2014	Danez Smith	Tim "Toaster" Henderson
2013	Dominique Ashaheed	Jared Singer
2012	Marty McConnell	Mckendy Fils-Aimé
2011	Rachel McKibbens	Carrie Rudzinski
2010	Eboni Hogan	Omoizele "Oz" Okoawo
2009	Rudy Francisco	J. W. "Baz" Basilo

== See also ==
- Individual World Poetry Slam
- List of performance poets
- Oral poetry
- Performance poetry
- Poetry Slam
- Poetry Slam, Inc.
- Spoken word
- Women of the World Poetry Slam
