= Austin Poetry Slam =

Slam poetry in Texas

The Austin Poetry Slam (APS) is one of the longest running poetry slam series in Texas. Founded in 1994 by Wammo of the Asylum Street Spankers and helmed for 15 years by former Poetry Slam, Inc. president, Mike Henry, Austin Slam is renowned for memorable and often raucous performances by many of the best poets in the slam poetry world. Austin Slam is best known nationally for hosting the National Poetry Slam (NPS) in 1998, 2006, & 2007, and for Austin teams' national finals stage performances in 1996, 2003, & 2008.

Since its inception, many nationally known poets have been regulars and team members at APS, these include Ernie Cline (writer of Fanboys), Ragan Fox (host of Fox in the City), Big Poppa E, Karyna McGlynn, Susan B.A. Somers-Willett, Danny Strack, Andy Buck, Genevieve Van Cleve, Da'shade Moonbeam, Christopher Michael, Shannon Leigh, Tony Jackson, Christopher Lee, Krissi Reeves, Emily Shafer, Phil West, Sonya Feher, Faylita Hicks, Love Robinson, Peter Nevland, Danny Solis, David Hendler, Zell Miller III, Hilary Thomas, Matthew John Conely, Ruff Draft, The Minister Sin, Erin Livingston, Jacob "Ohio Jake" Rakovan, Jeff & Tonie Knight, and far too many others to list. In addition, touring poets regularly stop by. Notable featured poets have included Jess Howard, Buddy Wakefield, Derrick C. Brown, Taylor Mali, Mighty Mike McGee, Cristin O'Keefe Aptowicz, Andrea Gibson, and many others.

The Austin Slam has made its home in a variety of venues throughout Austin over the years, including the Electric Lounge, Mojo's Daily Grind, Gaby n Mo's, The Mercury, Ego's Bar, the Scoot Inn, the ND, Progress Coffee and most recently in 2011, The United States Art Authority. In addition to the weekly show, APS has hosted other readings around Austin, including for the Blanton Art Museum and for SXSW. The slam has also released several compilations of local work throughout the years, including Tina's Fine Ass Lingere, a 2007 team CD, and a 2008 DVD recording of the slam-off at the Long Center.

Over the years, the Austin Poetry Slam has been held at numerous Austin venues, including the Electric Lounge, Mojo's Daily Grind, Gaby & Mo's, The Mercury, Ego's Bar, the Scoot Inn, the ND, Progress Coffee, the United States Art Authority, Spiderhouse, and The Native Hostel. As of 2026, the slam is held weekly on Wednesday evenings at the Alamo Drafthouse Mueller. In addition to its weekly events, APS partners with organizations and festivals and offers a monthly free writing workshop.

== History ==
By 1998, the Austin Poetry Slam was holding weekly competitions at the Electric Lounge. Five audience members selected at each event judged original poems through three elimination rounds, with weekly winners receiving $50 and qualifying for Superslam. The May 1998 Superslam brought together ten previous winners, including two-time champion Genevieve Van Cleve, Wammo, Ernie Cline, Karyna McGlynn, and Sara S. Wynn; its four highest-placing poets advanced to Austin's team for the 1998 National Poetry Slam. Mike Henry and Phil West co-directed the national event, which was scheduled across six Austin venues with the finals at the Paramount Theatre.

- Hosted the 1998, 2006, and 2007 National Poetry Slam

NPS Austin Team Placings by Year
1995	13th of 26
1996	4th of 27
1997	7th of 33
1998	9th of 45
1999	12th of ~50
2000	24th of 56
2003	3rd of 55
2006	5th of 66
2007	6th of 70
2008	3rd of 76

Austin Poetry Slam National Teams
1995	Mike Henry, Genevieve Van Cleve, Wammo, Phil West
1996	Danny Solis, Hilary Thomas, Wammo, Phil West, Coach: Mike Henry
1997	Susan B.A. Somers-Willett, Genevieve Van Cleve, Wammo, Phil West, Coach: Mike Henry
1998	Ernie Cline, Karyna McGlynn, Susan B.A. Somers-Willett, Genevieve Van Cleve, Coach: Jeff Knight
1999	Vickie Charleston, Ernie Cline, Karyna McGlynn, Phil West, Mike Henry (replacing Ernie Cline)
2000	Sonya Feher, Ragan Fox, Jeff Knight, Gerald Youngblood
2001	Grand Slam Champion: Ernie Cline, Ragan Fox, Jeff Knight, Sara Winn, Coach: Susan B.A. Somers-Willett
2002	Grand Slam Champion: Matthew John Conley, Andy Buck, Big Poppa E, Ragan Fox
2003	Grand Slam Champion: Christopher Lee, Andy Buck, Genevieve Van Cleve, Da'shade Moonbeam, Alternate: Tony Jackson
2004	Grand Slam Champion: Da'shade Moonbeam, Christopher Lee, Tony Jackson, Andy Buck, Zell Miller III, Alternate: David Hendler
2005	Grand Slam Champion: Christopher Michael, Suzy La Follette, Michael P Whalen, Krissi Reeves, Christopher Lee
2006	Grand Slam Champion: Christopher Michael, Genevieve Van Cleve, Da'shade Moonbeam, Tony Jackson, Zell Miller III
2007	Grand Slam Champion: Da'shade Moonbeam, Andy Buck, Tony Jackson, Danny Strack, Krissi Reeves
2008	Grand Slam Co-Champion: Da'shade Moonbeam, Grand Slam Co-Champion: Andy Buck, Tony Jackson, Danny Strack, Christopher Lee
2009	Grand Slam Champion: Faylita Hicks, Big Poppa E. Christopher Lee, Tony Jackson, Danny Strack
2010	Grand Slam Champion: Danny Strack, Lacey Roop. Christopher Lee, Seth Walker, Tova Charles
2011	Grand Slam Champion: Kevin W. Burke, Zachary Caballero, Lacey Roop, Good Ghost Bill, Jomar Valentin
2012	Grand Slam Champion: Good Ghost Bill, Margaret Ruth Olson, Kevin W. Burke, Keith Ruckus, Zachary Caballero
2013	Grand Slam Champion: Good Ghost Bill, Zai Sadler, Amir Safi, Tova Charles, Kevin W. Burke
