= Cristin O'Keefe Aptowicz =

American nonfiction writer and poet (born 1978)

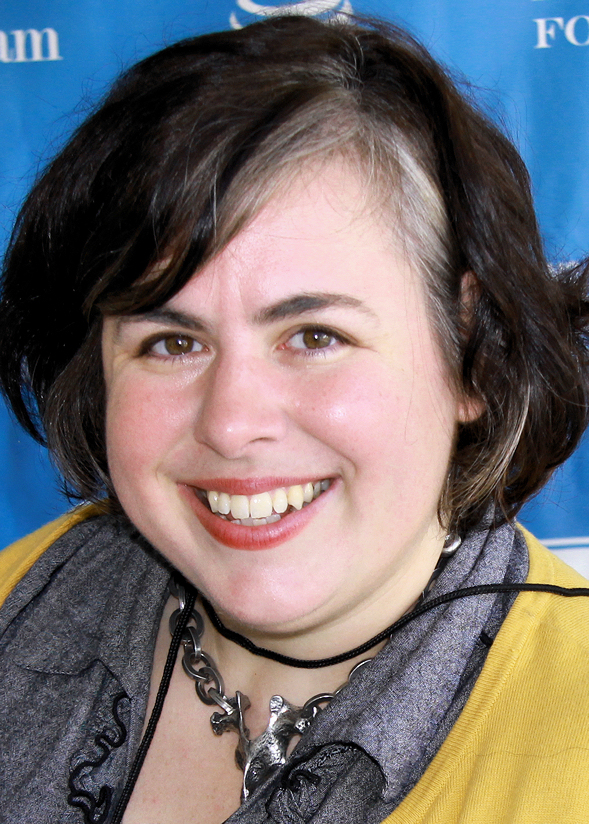
- Aptowicz at the 2014 Texas Book Festival.
- Born: November 26, 1978 (age 47); Philadelphia, Pennsylvania, U.S.
- Occupations: Poet, Writer
- Spouse: Ernest Cline (m. 2016)
- Writing career
- Notable works: Dr Mütter's Marvels: A True Tale of Intrigue and Innovation at the Dawn of Modern Medicine
- Notable awards: National Endowment for the Arts Fellowship in Literature (2011)
- Movements: Narrative nonfiction, Slam Poetry
- Website: www.aptowicz.com

Cristin O'Keefe Aptowicz (/ˈæptəwɪts/ AP-tə-wits; born November 26, 1978) is an American nonfiction writer and poet.

== Life ==
A native of Philadelphia, the daughter of Bruce S. Aptowicz and Maureen (O'Keefe) Aptowicz, Cristin O'Keefe Aptowicz graduated from Central High School of Philadelphia in 1996 and earned a B.F.A. in Dramatic Writing from New York University in 2000. Her brother, Kevin Aptowicz, is a professor of physics at West Chester University. On June 18, 2016, she married novelist/screenwriter Ernest Cline, whom she met at the 1998 National Poetry Slam.

== Poetry ==
Aptowicz was introduced to the New York City Poetry Slam community by NYU classmate, Beau Sia. In November 1998, at age 19, she founded the NYC-Urbana Poetry Slam series.

NYC-Urbana was the formal continuation of a poetry slam series started by Bob Holman and as of 2008, has earned three National Poetry Slam Championships: 1997 (as Team Mouth Almighty), 2000 and 2002. Aptowicz was a member of the 1998, 2001, 2003 and 2010 NYC-Urbana Poetry Slam teams. Well-known poets who have been on NYC-Urbana Poetry Slam teams including Taylor Mali, Beau Sia, Anis Mojgani and Sarah Kay, among others. Aptowicz was the 2010 Women of the World Poetry Slam (WOWps) representative for NYC-Urbana.

Aptowicz is the author of eight books of poetry, including the recently released, Against Vanishing (Write Bloody Publishing, 2025). A previous book, The Year of No Mistakes (Write Bloody Publishing, 2018) won the Writers' League of Texas Book of the Year Award for Poetry 2013–2014. Aptowicz's other books of poetry are: Dear Future Boyfriend (2000), Hot Teen Slut (2001), Working Class Represent (2003), Oh, Terrible Youth (2007), Everything is Everything (2010), and How to Love the Empty Air (2018), which are all available via Write Bloody Publishing.

Aptowicz appeared in the concert film Taylor Mali & Friends Live at the Bowery Poetry Club and in the documentary; Slam Planet (2006). In 2003, she served the overseas mentor for Mouth Off!, a youth poetry show commissioned by the Sydney Opera House. She frequently tours with poets Buddy Wakefield, Derrick Brown and Anis Mojgani on their "poetry revival tours," joining them on their 2008 Junkyard Ghost Revival tour, 2009 Elephant Engine High Dive Revival tour and 2010 Night Kite Revival tour.

Aptowicz received a 2011 National Endowment for the Arts Fellowship for Poetry. She is among the first four "slam poets" to win an NEA fellowship, following Hal Sirowitz (who was on the Nuyorican Poets Cafe Poetry Slam team in 1993, and won an NEA Fellowship in Poetry in 1994); Jeffrey McDaniel (who was on numerous DC and California slam teams in the mid to late 1990s, and won a NEA Fellowship in Poetry in 2003); and Adrienne Su (who was on the Nuyorican Poets Cafe Poetry Slam team in 1991, and won a NEA Fellowship in Poetry in 2007).

Aptowicz was awarded the 2013 Amy Clampitt Residency. The residency takes place in the former residence of poet Amy Clampitt and provides "an established or emerging poet or literary scholar with the rare gift of extended time and a reasonable stipend so that he or she may substantially further his or her creative work." Aptowicz is the first poet from a poetry slam background to be awarded this residency.

== Non-fiction ==
Aptowicz has published non-fiction essays, articles and excerpts in The Atlantic, Smithsonian magazine, io9, Live Science, Bust magazine, About.com's Poetry Channel and the spoken word anthology Word Warriors.

In 2008, Soft Skull Press published Aptowicz's first book of nonfiction, Words In Your Face: A Guided Tour Through Twenty Years of the New York City Poetry Slam. U.S. Poet Laureate Billy Collins wrote that the book "leaves no doubt that the slam poetry scene has achieved legitimacy and taken its rightful place on the map of contemporary literature" and The Washington Post named it one of five Notable Books on Exploring Poetry in 2008. Aptowicz spent 4 years writing the book, which "explores the birth, growing pains and continuing development of the Poetry Slam." The book features interviews with Saul Williams, Maggie Estep, Bob Holman and Slamnation director Paul Devlin, among others.

Aptowicz wrote the non-fiction screenplay Mütter, based on the life of Mütter Museum founder Thomas Dent Mütter. It won the 2003 "Set In Philadelphia" Screenwriting Award at the Philadelphia Film Festival and a Sloan Foundation Fellowship at the 2004 Hampton International Film Festival. In 2005, she was invited to attend the 2005 Sloan Film Summit in support of the screenplay, and wrote an article about her experiences at the Summit by New York City's Museum of the Moving Image. As of 2008, the screenplay remained unproduced. A short based on the feature-length script was created as a part of the Philadelphia Film Festival prize package.

In 2010, Aptowicz was named the 2010–2011 University of Pennsylvania ArtsEdge Writer-in-Residence to work on a non-fiction book about the life of Mutter. Aptowicz's biography of Mütter, Dr. Mütter's Marvels: A True Tale of Intrigue and Innovation at the Dawn of Modern Medicine was published in September 2014 by the Gotham Books division of Penguin. The book received starred reviews in Publishers Weekly, Library Journal, School Library Journal and Kirkus Reviews. The hardcover debuted at #7 on The New York Times Bestseller List for Books about Health, and remained on the list for three months.

In March 2023, it was announced the Aptowicz signed a publishing deal with Simon & Schuster for a new nonfiction book, which was described as "a tale of surprising abolitionist collaboration between Philadelphia's wealthy free Black elite, rural white Quaker farmers, and the self-emancipated families who worked in both worlds, culminating in the Christiana Resistance, a bloody clash between enslavers and the formerly enslaved, and the ensuing 'trial of the century,' publicly challenging the Fugitive Slave Act and turning the nation's mood from compromise to war, revealing the power of ordinary people standing together against injustice." The book, The Ballad of the Fugitive William Parker: A True Tale of Love, Murder, Treason, and Ordinary Folks Who Saved America, will be published in September 8, 2026.

== Published works ==
=== Books ===
- The Ballad of the Fugitive William Parker (Simon and Schuster, 2026; ISBN 978-1668035931)
- Against Vanishing (Write Bloody Publishing, 2025; ISBN 978-1949342703)
- How to Love the Empty Air (Write Bloody Publishing, 2018; ISBN 978-1938912801)
- Dr. Mütter's Marvels: A True Tale of Intrigue and Innovation at the Dawn of Modern Medicine (Gotham Books, 2014; ISBN 978-1592408702)
- The Year of No Mistakes (Write Bloody Publishing, 2013; ISBN 978-1938912344)
- Everything is Everything (Write Bloody Publishing, 2010; ISBN 0-9842515-1-0)
- Words in Your Face: A Guided Tour Through Twenty Years of the New York City Poetry Slam (Soft Skull Press, 2008; ISBN 1-887012-17-6)
- Oh Terrible Youth (2007) (Write Bloody Publishing, 2011; ISBN 1-935904-66-3)
- Working Class Represent (2004) (Write Bloody Publishing, 2011; ISBN 1-935904-72-8)
- Hot Teen Slut (2001) (Write Bloody Publishing, 2011; ISBN 1-935904-68-X)
- Dear Future Boyfriend (2000) (Write Bloody Publishing, 2011; ISBN 1-935904-70-1)

== Awards ==
- Winner: Writer-in-Residence: Hedgebrook (2024)
- 2022 Hall of Fame Inductee: Central High School of Philadelphia
- Winner: Writers' League of Texas Book of the Year Award for Poetry 2013–2014
- Winner: Writer-in-Residence: Amy Clampitt House (2013)
- NEA Fellowship: National Endowment of the Arts Fellowship for Poetry (2011)
- Winner: Writer-in-Residence University of Pennsylvania (2010–2011)
- Winner: Poet in Residence: Culver Academies in Culver, Indiana (2009)
- Winner: Nadine B. Andreas Public Scholar in Speech Communication, Minnesota State University, Mankato (2008).
- Winner: Hampton International Film Festival's Sloan Fellowship for Screenwriting (2004)
- Semi-Finalist: Nicholl Fellowships in Screenwriting for Mütter (2004)
- Winner: Grand Prize, Philadelphia Film Festival for Mütter (2003).
- Winner: Myers Foundation Grant (2001 and 2003)
- Two-Time Winner: National Poetry Slam: Slammaster's Slam (2000, 2001).
- Three-time Winner: NYU/Barnes and Noble Monologue Contest (1999–2000)

== See also ==
- Performance poetry
- Poetry slam
- Spoken word
- Bowery Poetry Club
