= Danny Strack =

American poet

- Born: January 3, 1979 (age 47); Austin, Texas
- Occupations: Slam Poet, Writer
- Writing career
- Literary movement: Slam Poetry
- Website: www.dannystrack.com

Danny Strack is a performance poet and juggler, residing in Austin, TX. He was the Slam Master of Austin Poetry Slam, during the weekly show at the Spider House Ballroom on Tuesday nights. He has been a regular performer at the Austin Poetry Slam, as well as other Central Texas venues including The Hideout Theatre, Kickbutt Coffee, Expressions, Ruta Maya and Neo Soul since 2003. He is a four-time member of the Austin Poetry Slam Team: 2007, 2008, 2009 and 2010, and a multiple time coach. In 2008, the team advanced to Finals and placed 3rd overall at the National Poetry Slam in Madison, WI. He was next on the Austin Neo Soul Nationals team, which placed first in the Group Poem Finals at the 2012 National Poetry Slam in Charlotte, NC.

Danny has also been a feature poet on EXSE, a showcase of Austin's best poets for Channel Austin and the Austin International Poetry Festival. In 2013, Danny collaborated with Texas State Musician, Craig Hella Johnson, of Austin's Conspirare to produce "Fusion", a workshop show that attempted to fuse spoken word poetry with choral song.

== Publications ==
- Growth ISBN 978-1-4499-2518-5

== Career highlights ==
- 2012 National Poetry Slam Group Champion (w/ Austin Neo-Soul).
- 2010 Austin Poetry Slam Champion.
- Member of the Austin Poetry Slam team: 2007, 2008, 2009, 2010
- 2007: Southwest Shootout Individual Champion in Albuquerque, New Mexico
- 2008: 3rd Place Overall Team at the 2008 National Poetry Slam
- 2010: Frontera Fest Best of Week Wild Card for "Growth"
- 2005, 2006, 2008, 2010: Frontera Fest Best of Fest for "Haiku Death Match"
