= Genevieve Van Cleve =

American slam poet and political consultant

Genevieve Van Cleve is an American slam poet, political consultant, and organizer. She is best known nationally as a prominent member of the Austin teams that competed at the National Poetry Slam during the 1990s, as well as host of Austin's weekly slam. Later, she worked as a Democratic political consultant and organizer.

== Poetry and performance ==
A member of the original Austin Poetry Slam team, Van Cleve competed at the National Poetry Slam in 1995, 1997, and 1998. She won Austin's Superslam twice, and the 1997 team placed seventh among 33 teams.

She became a regular host of Austin's weekly slam at the Electric Lounge. After Wammo stepped back from hosting, Van Cleve shared emcee duties with Phil West and Mike Henry. She called her fast-paced approach the "Good Ship Genevieve".

At the 1998 national competition in Austin, an Associated Press profile captured Van Cleve's combination of "a poet's heart and a strategist's mind". She challenged a gender double standard after a male competitor was allowed to remove his shirt during Austin's narrow loss to Dallas.

Hosting slams was only part of her work on Austin stages. Van Cleve performed improvisational comedy with Monks' Night Out and emceed a showcase at the third Big Stinkin' International Improv & Sketch Comedy Festival at Esther's Pool.

She was still performing slam poetry in 2004, bringing quick wit and irreverence to her performances. Her work also appeared in the 2006 chapbook Chick on the Team: Commentary on Chicks, Politics & Joy and the 2007 poetry CD Lady Business.

== Political work ==
Van Cleve has a degree in political science and left a job lobbying for the oil and gas industry. Her political and cultural circles often overlapped in Austin. She lived for two years in the guest cottage at Grassroots, Liz Carpenter's home, where she wrote about humor in progressive activism and cooking gumbo with Carpenter. She was part of Molly Ivins's Final Friday gatherings, where political conversation mixed with music, storytelling, and slam poetry.

She participated in the 2005 anti-war protest at Camp Casey near Crawford, Texas. Three years later she managed Democrat Diana Maldonado's campaign for Texas House District 52 in Williamson County.

Much of her later political work involved women candidates. She was deputy political director of Annie's List from 2009 to 2013. She was also president of Capital Area Democratic Women in 2012. She worked as a consultant on Sarah Eckhardt's successful 2014 Democratic primary campaign for Travis County judge.

Van Cleve, Lize Burr, and Katie Naranjo organized the Texas Women Vote Project in 2014. The PAC worked on voter turnout, training prospective candidates, and media training for women in politics and public policy. The following year Van Cleve was spokeswoman and later leader of the Community for Civil and Family Courthouse PAC, which backed a Travis County bond proposal for a new civil and family courthouse. Annie's List brought her back as political director later in 2015. She remained close to Eckhardt's administration as well; one of the unofficial advisers in her quarterly "kitchen cabinet".

As a local political consultant, she spoke publicly about Austin's campaign-finance rules and the practical effect of the city's donor-residency restrictions on campaigns. Like her work with women candidates, her consulting work focused largely on women candidates. She consulted for Shannon Hutcheson before Hutcheson entered the race for Texas's 10th congressional district.

She became Texas director of All on the Line. During the 2021 redistricting cycle she trained people to testify before legislative committees and helped build a public record around the proposed district maps. After the maps were adopted, she called them a partisan power grab and said they did not accurately reflect the 2020 census. In 2026,Van Cleve was a regional organizer for the League of Women Voters.
