= Shaggy Flores =

American poet

- Born: January 1973 (age 53); New York City
- Occupations: Poet, Writer, Publisher, African Diaspora Scholar, Activist
- Writing career
- Period: 1993 - present
- Literary movement: Nuyorican, Slam, Spoken Word, Performance Poetry
- Website: www.shaggyflores.com

Jaime "Shaggy" Flores (born 1973) is a Nuyorican poet, writer and African Diaspora scholar who forms part of the Nuyorical literary movement.

== Early years ==
Shaggy Flores, was born and raised in Spanish Harlem, New York City, as well as in Puerto Rico and Springfield, Massachusetts. He received his primary and secondary education in Puerto Rico and Massachusetts. As a child, growing up in Robinson Gardens Housing Projects, he was heavily exposed to the work of the early Nuyorican poets, his mother being a poet herself. Later in junior high and high school, he showed proficiency in writing and creating short stories that depicted the Puerto Rican experience. He graduated from the High School of Commerce and eventually met a recruiter for the University of Massachusetts Amherst (BCP Program) who helped him continue his studies.

During the early nineties, he was heavily involved with student politics at the University of Massachusetts, resurrecting old student organizations and creating new ones in the process. It was during this period that his work as a Nuyorican poet became known and he began to find elder Nuyorican poets who could serve as mentors.

He completed his education at the University of Massachusetts with a degree in the African Diaspora. He also, along with student organizers from La Causa of Amherst College, created the annual Voices for the Voiceless poetry concert, which takes place every December at Amherst College. Voices is one of the largest Diaspora poetry concerts in the Northeast, bringing nationally established ALANA and LGBTQ writers to the five-college community for one night of poetry. It was at this event that he established the Louis Reyes Rivera Lifetime Achievement Award to honor legendary artists.

== Early Debut ==
Shaggy Flores made his early poetry debut by performing his work at the first North East Latino Student Conference at the University of Massachusetts Amherst, in the early nineties then later for a series of events produced by the Puerto Rican Student organization. He was a member of the Umass Poetry Society and traveled frequently to New York to perform at events such as the annual Muévete Conference held at Hostos Community College and later at the National Poetry Slam held in Providence, RI.

Early readings would include performances at the Nuyorican Poets Café, Columbia University, Smith College, Mount Holyoke College, Springfield College, the University of North Carolina, Chapel Hill, and for a poetry troupe created by Louis Reyes Rivera and Felipe Luciano call the Wordquestra in New York City. He would later get to meet and perform with many of the early Nuyorican writers who inspired him to become a writer.

His poems and interviews have been published in journals, books, websites, and anthologies.

Flores lecturing

Voices for the Voiceless Photo

Shaggy Flores and Victor Hernández Cruz

Poster from the Ninth Annual Voices concert

== Writing history ==
Flores is the author of Sancocho - A Book of Nuyorican Poetry, and can be found in the anthologies Role Call and Bum Rush the Page: A Def Poetry Jam, both edited by Tony Medina (the latter co-edited with Louis Reyes Rivera). He is one of the founders of the annual Voices for the Voiceless Poetry Concert which occurs in the five college UMass Amherst area.

He was a member of the 2000 National Hartford Slam team and competed in the 2001 Nationals as an independent competitor representing Springfield, MA. Shaggums also performed at the National Poetry Slam 2001 Latino showcase and in the NPS African American Showcase in Seattle, Washington. Flores was also one of the first Latino poets along with raúlrsalinas to feature at the Austin International Poetry Festival.

Flores is also the founder of Dark Souls Press and Aristotle's Playground, a web and print design firm.

== Currently ==
Shaggy Flores resides in the Mid-Atlantic area where he is at work on various national writing campaigns and is completing a Masters in History Degree. He is an active member of Iota Phi Theta fraternity and lectures around the country on issues pertaining to the African Diaspora. Shaggy is also completing his next book of poetry, Obatala's Bugalu: A Nuyorican Book of Sights and Sounds, to be released in the summer of 2008.

== See also ==
- Puerto Rican literature
- List of Puerto Ricans
- List of Puerto Rican writers
- Nuyorican Poets Café
- Nuyorican Movement
- Performance poetry
- Iota Phi Theta fraternity
- Black history in Puerto Rico
