= Sonia Guiñansaca =

Poet

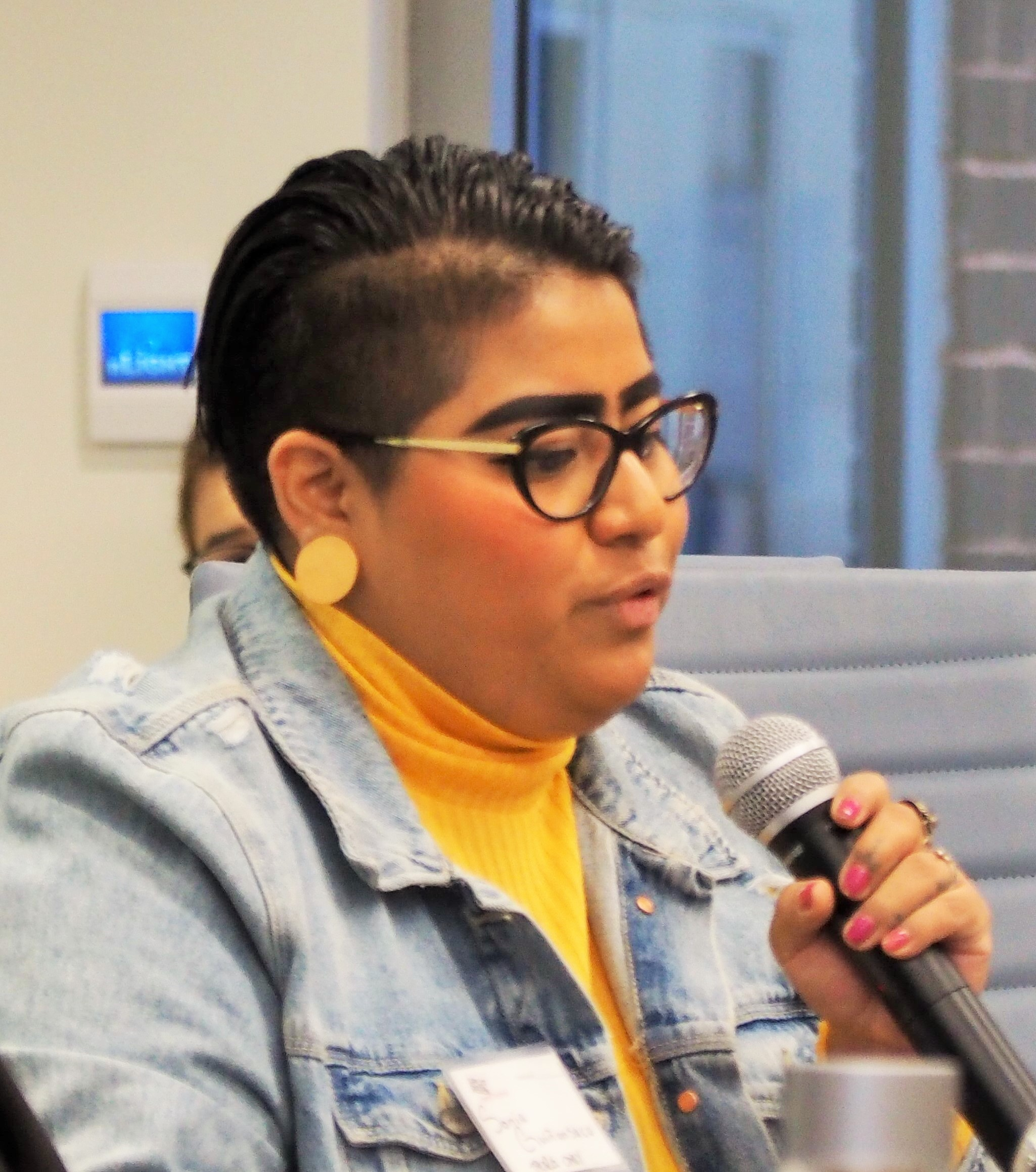
- Born: 1989 (age 36–37); Cuenca, Ecuador
- Education: Hunter College
- Writing career
- Genre: Poetry

Sonia Guiñansaca (born in Cuenca, Ecuador in 1989) is a migrant poet, cultural organizer and activist whose work aims for culture equality and social justice, focusing on migrant rights, climate change, LGBTQ+ rights, and gender discrimination.

== Background ==
Guiñansaca migrated from Ecuador to Harlem at the age of five to reunite with their parents, who were undocumented. After graduation (Hunter College with a BA in Africana Puerto Rican Latino Studies and Women and Gender Studies) with their background in organizing migrant undocumented communities, they determined that not only policy but art and culture play crucial roles to bring social changes. Since 2013, they worked at Culture Strike as the managing director, an American organization with more than 200 artists of multiple disciplines working for a social change acknowledging and supporting queer, transgender, women, color, migrant emergent artists. In particular, they created the first writing workshops by and for undocumented writers, then co-created the first and only national writing retreat for undocumented writers called UndocuWriters Retreat. In the spring of 2013, they created and helped launch Undocumenting.tmblr.com, a project highlighting the work of undocumented immigrants. Guiñansaca has performed in many different places such as Museo del Barrio, Nuyorican Poets Café, NY Poetry Festival, Metropolitan Museum of Art, Brooklyn Museum, London, Mexico, and featured in Latina Magazine, PBS, Poetry Foundation, etc. They also presented Keynotes, workshops and panels in different Universities. In October 2017, they self-published their debut chapbook Nostalgia & Borders and is editing the first undocumented poetry anthology Home in Time of Displacement and currently working on a new chapbook #PapiFemme, which will focus on the central themes of gender and presentation, as well as the queer and immigrant communities. They were named by Teen Vogue as one of the "13 Coolest Queers on the Internet."

== Works ==
- Nostalgia & Borders, 2017. OCLC 994629327
