= Derrick C. Brown =

American poet

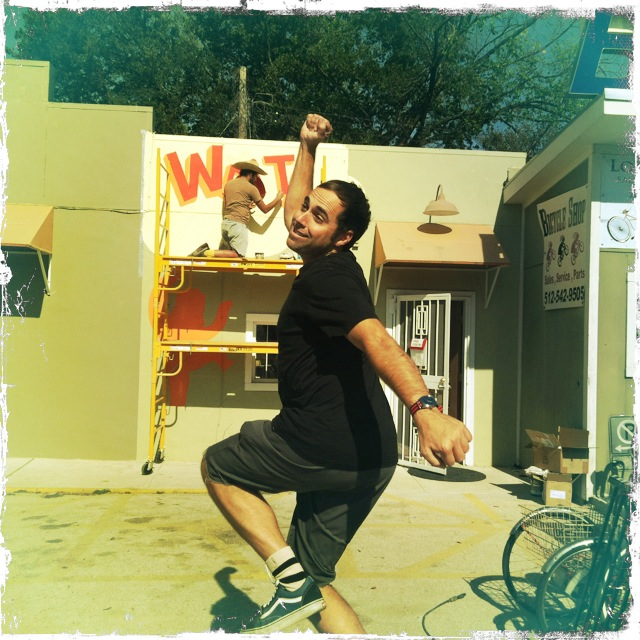
- Brown celebrating the construction of Write Bloody's first store in Austin
- Born: Derrick Clifford Brown; February 7, 1973 (age 53); San Francisco, California, US
- Occupations: Poet, Performer, Publisher
- Writing career
- Notable works: Strange Light, Born In The Year of the Butterfly Knife
- Movements: Poetry, Publishing, Slam Poetry
- Website: brownpoetry.com

Derrick C. Brown (born February 7, 1973) is an American comedian, poet/performer and founder of Write Bloody Publishing. He is the author of several books of poetry and is a popular touring author. He lived outside of Austin, Texas in Elgin, Texas and currently resides in Los Angeles.

== Life ==
Brown graduated from Pacifica High School in 1991 and became a decorated paratrooper for the 82nd Airborne in Ft. Bragg, North Carolina for three years from 1991-1993. He is a disabled veteran due to hearing loss from artillery while being enlisted during the First Gulf War. He studied Speech and Debate (Forensics), Playwriting and Broadcast Journalism at Cypress College, Palomar College and Northern Arizona University in Flagstaff Arizona.

== Music ==
Brown was the lead singer/songwriter of the John Wilkes Kissing Booth and All Black Cinema. Most recently, he performs with musician Beau Jennings in the group "Night Reports" which focuses on haunted baseball themed music. He credits his background in independent music for much of his success with his touring career and publishing house.

== Poetry / Performance ==
Brown first discovered poetry when he was enlisted in the 82nd Airborne. His involvement with poetry escalated when he became involved with the Long Beach and Orange County Poetry Slam community. He competed at his first National Poetry Slam in 1998, where he placed second in the National Poetry Slam individual championship in 1998. He began touring nationally with his poetry shortly thereafter. To date, Brown has performed at over 1800 venues and universities, including Glastonbury, La Sorbonne in Paris, CBGB's, The Nuyorican Poets Café in New York City, The Mission Creek Literary Festival and The Berlin International Literary Festival.

Early in his career, Brown often toured solo. However, he became known for touring and collaborating with other artists. In October 2006, Brown teamed up with poet and actress Amber Tamblyn for several poetry performances in California called The Lazers of Sexcellance. In 2007, he toured Europe opening for the band Cold War Kids, chronicled in the documentary poetry concert film about him, You Belong Everywhere. In 2009, The All Tomorrow's Parties Festival, curated by The Flaming Lips, invited Derrick Brown to be the opening act for comedian David Cross. Brown performed with The Navy Gravy. IN 2006, Brown collaborated with painter Blaine Fontana for a live reading and gallery opening of new paintings based on Brown's work. Brown performed as a poet on The Tonight show with Jay Leno in 2007 with Cold War Kids, Elvis Perkins and Jessica Alba.

Brown was known for curating unique poetry events like the Double Decker Poetry Bus Party and poetry shows at sea for Poetry Cruise, which he started in Long Beach CA, 2008.

Brown has performed for the Best American Contemporary Poetry Concert series, The Drums Inside Your Chest, curated by Mindy Nettifee and Amber Tamblyn. He appears in the film of the same name.

In 2011, Brown was commissioned to write a new, 40-55 minute long poem for the Noord Nederlands Dans Collective, choreographed by Juilliard alum Stephen Shropshire. The work, Instrumental, was achieved by using fourteen dancers, an orchestra, one poet and was conducted by Emily Wells and Timmy Straw. It received highly positive reviews in the Netherlands and Canada.

== The Poetry Revival Tours ==
In 2007, Brown began touring annually with Buddy Wakefield and Anis Mojgani, calling their group “The Poetry Revival.” Each year, the group invited other popular performance poets and musicians to join them for certain legs of the tour, and altered the name slightly to reflect the changing line-up. 2007 was known as "Solomon Sparrow's Electric Whale Revival". 2008 was known as "Junkyard Ghost Revival". 2009 was known the "Elephant Engine High Dive Revival". And 2010 was known as the "Night Kite Revival". These poetry events were performed to large crowds across the United States.

== Write Bloody Publishing ==
In 2004, Brown started Write Bloody Publishing, an independent press founded in Nashville, TN. It moved headquarters to Long Beach, CA and in 2012, moved it again to Austin, Texas. Brown is quoted as saying that he utilizes a record label model for running his publishing company.

In 2012, Brown launched The Shelf Life Poetry project to send poetry books that would otherwise be shredded to homeless shelters, prisons and underfunded youth writing programs.

In 2012, Brown opened up the first all-poetry physical bookshop for his press, called Write Bloody, in Austin, Texas.

== Books ==
- Junebug Melatonin (Kapow!)
- Workin Mime to Five, Cruise Ship Pantomimery revealed! (alias, Dick Richards) (Write Bloody Publishing) 2011
- I Love You Is Back (Write Bloody Publishing)
- Born in the Year of the Butterfly Knife (Write Bloody Publishing)
- Scandalabra: Poetry & Prose (Write Bloody Publishing)
- Strange Light (Write Bloody Publishing) 2012
- Our Poison Horse, Write Bloody Publishing 2014
- How the Body Works the Dark, (not a cult) 2017
- Hello, it doesn't matter. (Write Bloody Publishing) 2018
- A Little Grief Break: The Collected Poems (Write Bloody Publishing) 2025

== Children's books (Write Fuzzy Publishing) ==
- Hot Hands and Ralph In The Weirdo Winter
- I Looooove You, Whale!
- Valentine The Porcupine Dances Funny

== Anthologies ==
Collections in which Derrick Brown's work is included:

- Amalgamate, The art of Blaine Fontana (Zero+ Publishing) 2011 978-0982246153
- Elephant Engine High Dive Revival (Write Bloody Publishing), 2009; ISBN 0-9821488-9-5)
- The Good Things About America (Write Bloody Publishing), 2009; ISBN 978-0-9821488-1-5)
- Junkyard Ghost Revival (Write Bloody Publishing), 2008; ISBN 0-9815213-6-3)
- Spoken Word Revolution, Redux (Sourcebooks) 978-1402208690
- The Last American Valentine (Write Bloody Publishing), 2007; ISBN 0-9789989-7-9)
- So Luminous The Wildflowers, (Tebot Bach)
- Beyond The Valley of The Contemporary Poets (VCP, 1999)
- Blue Arc West, (Tebot Bach)
- Planet Slam, (German)
- Poetry Slam (Manic D Press, 2000; ISBN 0-916397-66-1)
- Aim For The Head, An Anthology of Zombie Poetry (Write Bloody Publishing)
- Learn Then Burn. Poems For The Classroom (Write Bloody Publishing)

== Albums ==
- You're all out, Night Reports
- Greatest Slits, poetry by Derrick Brown
- *A Threat in the Broadcast, The John Wilkes Kissing Booth
- Black Urchin, poetry by Derrick Brown, Music by Richard Swift
- All Black Cinema, It's like Stars Hitting Ice, Indie Rock
- My Hands, Your Neck, poetry by Derrick Brown

== Awards ==
- National Defense Service Medal
- Best Local Poet, OC Weekly, 2000
- AFA Winner Poetry, 1997
- AFA Palomar College, CC Champion
- Two time winner of the Army Achievement Medal
- Expert Marksman, Grenadier, Driver, M60 award, 1991-1993
- Bank of America award for Drama, 1991

== See also ==
- Write Bloody Publishing
