= Hal Sirowitz =

American poet (1949–2025)

Harold Sirowitz (March 6, 1949 – October 17, 2025) was an American poet who was named the Poet Laureate of Queens, New York.

== Life and career ==
Sirowitz was born on March 6, 1949, in Manhattan. He earned a degree from Hofstra in education. He first began to attract attention at the Nuyorican Poets Cafe where he was a frequent competitor in their Friday Night Poetry Slam. He eventually made the 1993 Nuyorican Poetry Slam team, and competed in the 1993 National Poetry Slam (held that year in San Francisco) along with his Nuyorican teammates Maggie Estep, Tracie Morris, and Regie Cabico.

He would later perform his poetry on stages across the country, and on television programs such as MTV's Spoken Word: Unplugged and PBS's The United States of Poetry. He wrote eleven books of poetry, including the volumes Mother Said, My Therapist Said and Father Said. He was the best-selling translated poet in Norway, where Mother Said has been adapted for the stage and turned into a series of animated cartoons.

Sirowitz was a 1994 recipient of an NEA Fellowship in Poetry and was the Poet Laureate of Queens. He worked as a special education teacher in the New York public school system for 23 years. He was married to the writer Mary Minter Krotzer.

On October 17, 2025, Sirowitz died in Philadelphia, Pennsylvania, after a long battle with Parkinson's disease. He was 76.

== Bibliography ==
- Girlie Pictures, Long Island City, NY: Low-Tech Press, 1982.
- Bedroom Wall, New Brunswick, NJ: Iniquity Press/Vendetta Books, 1992.
- Fishnet Stockings, New York: Appearances, no. 20, 1993.
- No More Birthdays, Bristolville, OH: The Bacchae Press, 1993.
- Happy Baby, 1997. Bristolville, OH: The Bacchae Press, 1995.
- Two Second Kiss, Harvey, LA: Mulberry Press, 1995.
- Mother Said, New York: Crown, 1996.
- My Therapist Said, New York: Crown, 1998.
- Before, During, & After, Brooklyn: Soft Skull Press, 2003.
- Father Said, Brooklyn: Soft Skull Press, 2004.
- Stray Cat Blues, Omaha: The Backwaters Press, 2012.
