= Electric Lounge =

Former music and arts venue in Austin, Texas

- Hamell on Trial performing at the Electric Lounge in 1994
- Interactive map of Electric Lounge
- Address: 302 Bowie Street; Austin, Texas; United States
- Coordinates: 30.2688°N 97.7538°W
- Type: Music venue and multidisciplinary arts space

Construction
- Opened: 1993
- Closed: April 11, 1999

The Electric Lounge was a club in Austin, Texas, founded by filmmaker Mark Shuman and architect Jay Hughey. The venue presented live music, poetry, theatre, film screenings, comedy and visual art from 1993 to 1999.

== History ==
=== Founding and design ===
Shuman and Hughey came up with the idea during a night at the Black Cat Lounge. They wanted a club for music and other arts, and spent about six months building the interior of the rented warehouse. While they were still working on it, poet and promoter Mike Henry arrived with cassette tapes and publicity photographs for bands he wanted to book. He began booking performers at the club and later became a co-owner.

The club occupied a warehouse at 302 Bowie Street, on a dead-end street near downtown. Used-car lots and repair shops surrounded it. Shoal Creek and the former Seaholm Power Plant separated the area from downtown activity.

The room had brick walls and exposed structural supports. A large red "Electric" sign hung above the stage.

=== Fire and rebuilding ===
A fire gutted much of the Electric Lounge’s interior about ten months after it opened. Shuman and members of the club’s music community rebuilt the venue. After the fire, the club set up an outdoor tent for South by Southwest and continued using one during the festival in later years.

=== Music and other programming ===
The Gourds originally only played Tuesday nights, but as their crowds grew, the club moved them to a Saturday show. Like the Gourds, Spoon also played Tuesdays before finding a wider audience, while Hamell on Trial held a Friday residency. Lucinda Williams worked on songs for Car Wheels on a Gravel Road during several sold-out shows at the club.

The Austin Poetry Slam met weekly at the Electric Lounge. Superslam selected Austin’s National Poetry Slam team, with two-time champion Genevieve Van Cleve among the competitors. Superslam 1999 was the last regular slam held there.

Salvage Vanguard Theater launched at the Electric Lounge with Kid Carnivore in 1994 and used the warehouse as its base for its first three years. The Rude Mechanicals staged Ubu Roi there and also held benefits combining theatre, visual art, music, and performance. The venue participated as part of the Big Stinkin' International Improv & Sketch Comedy Festivals for two years.

=== Closure ===
By early 1999, the club struggled to pay its bills. Musicians and supporters held benefit shows and a silent auction to keep it open.

Higher rent and operating costs increased the club's losses, while downtown construction made it harder to reach. The state also raised its required alcohol-tax bond from about $2,000 to $12,500. After Hughey had moved to Los Angeles, Shuman and Henry decided to close rather than take on more debt.

The final concert was on April 10, 1999. Spoon ended the scheduled program, then Hamell on Trial made an unannounced appearance. The club held its last gathering the following night. Henry gave a farewell at the last poetry slam, and the red "Electric" sign was turned off early on April 12.

Liberty Lunch, Steamboat and the Bates Motel also closed that year as Austin's property values and operating expenses rose.

== Aftermath and legacy ==
The warehouse at 302 Bowie Street remained in use after the Electric Lounge closed. The building was later demolished. The 42-story Spring condominium tower now occupies the site.

Former performers reunited at 3TEN at ACL Live in 2019, twenty years after the club closed. The music and poetry event raised money for the SIMS Foundation, Mosaic Sound Collective and Austin artist Jason Austin. Another reunion at 3TEN in April 2024 marked the 25th anniversary, with a different lineup of former performers.
