= Write Bloody Publishing =

Independent American publishing house

- Founded: 2004
- Founder: Derrick C. Brown
- Country of origin: United States
- Headquarters location: Austin, Texas
- Distribution: SCB Distributors
- Publication types: Books
- Official website: writebloody.com

Write Bloody Publishing is an independent American publishing house, founded in 2004 by traveling poet Derrick C. Brown.

== Authors and titles ==
Authors	Books
Sheleen McElhinney	Every Little Vanishing, 2021
David Pérez	Love in a Time of Robot Apocalypse, 2011
Aaron Levy Samuels	Yarmulkes & Fitted Caps, 2013
Amber Flame	Ordinary Cruelty, 2017
Andrea Gibson	Pole Dancing to Gospel Hymns, 2010; The Madness Vase, 2011; Pansy, 2015
Anis Mojgani	The Feather Room, 2011; Songs from Under the River, 2013; The Pocketknife Bible: The Poems and Art of Anis Mojgani, 2015
Annelyse Gelman	Everyone I Love is a Stranger to Someone, 2014
Beau Sia	The Undisputed Greatest Writer of All Time, 2012
Bill Moran	Oh God Get Out Get Out, 2017
Brandon Melendez	Gold that Frames The Mirror, 2019
Brendan Constantine	Birthday Girl with Possum, 2011
Bucky Sinister	Time Bomb Snooze Alarm, 2012
Buddy Wakefield	Stunt Water, 2015
Caitlin Scarano	Do Not Bring Him Water, 2017
Clint Smith	Counting Descent, 2016
Cristin O'Keefe Aptowicz	Dear Future Boyfriend, 2011; Hot Teen Slut, 2011; How to Love the Empty Air, 2018
Derrick C. Brown	Born in the Year of the Butterfly Knife, 2004; I Love You is Back, 2006; Scandelabra, 2009; Learn Then Burn: A Modern Poetry Anthology for the Classroom, 2010; Learn Then Burn Teacher Guide and Workbook Companion, 2010; Strange Light, 2012; Learn Then Burn 2: This Time It's Personal, 2014; Our Poison Horse, 2014; UH-OH, 2016; Hello. It Doesn’t Matter., 2018
Elaina M. Ellis	Write About an Empty Birdcage, 2011
Ernest Cline	The Importance of Being Ernest, 2013
Franny Choi	Floating, Brilliant, Gone, 2014
Haley Hutchinson	Her Womanhood of Mine, 2026
Hieu Minh Nguyen	This Way to the Sugar, 2014
Jackson Burgess	Atrophy, 2018
Jason Bayani	Amulet, 2013
Jeanann Verlee	Racing Hummingbirds, 2010; Said the Manic to the Muse, 2015
Jeremy Radin	Slow Dance with Sasquatch, 2012
Jon Sands	The New Clean, 2011
Karen Finneyfrock	Ceremony for the Choking Ghost, 2010
Khary Jackson	Any Psalm You Want: Poems, 2013
Lauren Zuinga	The Smell of Good Mud, 2012
Lino Anunciacion	The Way We Move Through Water, 2018
Megan Falley	After the Witch Hunt, 2012; Redhead and the Slaughter King, 2014; Drive Here and Devastate Me, 2018; How Poetry Can Change Your Heart, 2019
Mike McGee	In Search of Midnight, 2009
Miles Walser	What the Night Demands, 2013
Mindy Nettifee	Rise of the Trustfall, 2010; Glitter in the Blood, 2012; Open Your Mouth Like a Bell, 2018
Nancy Huang	Favorite Daughter, 2017
Nicole Homer	Pecking Order, 2017
Pages Matam	The Heart of a Comet, 2014
Rob "RatpackSlim" Sturma	Miles of Hallelujah, 2009
Sarah Kay	No Matter the Wreckage, 2014
Seema Reza	A Constellation of Half-Lives, 2019
Shanny Jean Maney	I Love Science!, 2012
Sierra DeMulder	The Bones Below, 2010; New Shoes on a Dead Horse, 2012
Tara Hardy	Bring Down the Chandeliers, 2011; My, My, My, My, My, 2016
Taylor Mali	What Learning Leaves, 2002; The Last Time As We Are, 2009; Bouquet of Red Flags, 2014
Tim Stafford	Learn Then Burn, 2010; Learn Then Burn Teacher Guide and Workbook Companion, 2010; Learn Then Burn 2: This Time It's Personal, 2014
Solange Aguilar	Red Like Earth, 2026
