= Anis Mojgani =

American artist and poet

- Born: June 13, 1977 (age 49); New Orleans, Louisiana, U.S.
- Education: Savannah College of Art and Design (BFA, MFA)

10th Oregon Poet Laureate
- Incumbent
- Assumed office April 27, 2020
- Preceded by: Kim Stafford

Anis Mojgani (Persian: انیس مژگانی) (born June 13, 1977) is an American spoken word poet, visual artist and musician based in Portland, Oregon. Mojgani has been characterized as a "geek genius" with "fiercely hopeful word arias."

== Early life and education ==
Mojgani was born and raised in New Orleans, Louisiana. He later moved to Georgia and graduated from the Savannah College of Art and Design with a Bachelor of Fine Arts in sequential art and a Master of Fine Arts in performing arts.

== Career ==
Over the course of his career, Mojgani has been a member of several poetry slam teams. He was also a member of 2007's Solomon Sparrow's Electric Whale Revival and 2008's Junkyard Ghost Revival, both of which featured poets Buddy Wakefield and Derrick C. Brown as actively-touring members.

Mojgani won back-to-back titles in the National Individual Poetry Slam in 2005 and 2006, was interviewed in 2006 on KUOW-FM's The Beat, and was in the documentary Slam Planet: War of the Words. In 2007 Mojgani was on HBO's Def Poetry Jam and placed 2nd in Poetry Slam, Inc.'s 2007 Individual World Poetry Slam and won first place at 2007 World Cup Poetry Slam held in Bobigny, France as part of the French National Slam Championships among 16 National Poetry Slam Champions. and published and cover in the Summer 2007 edition of RATTLE.

Mojgani cites several influences: "Jeffrey McDaniel, Richard Brautigan, Charles Bukowski, Gregory Corso, Kerouac, MF Doom, Aesop Rock, Robert Rauschenberg, Basquiat, Chris Ware, Frank Miller, Saul Williams, Walt Whitman, Savannah, Georgia, New York City, New Orleans, being broke, being a hermit, Shoot the Piano Player, the Baháʼí writings and history." Mojgani was named in the book Words in Your Face: A Guided Tour Through Twenty Years of the New York City Poetry Slam as one of the poets who "saw success" after leaving New York City's notoriously competitive poetry slam community.

His book The Feather Room was a 2011 National Book Award nominee. Mojgani is featured performing a live poem in "Heartbreak Dreamer", the first song on Mat Kearney's 2015 album Just Kids.

On April 27, 2020, it was announced that Oregon Governor Kate Brown had appointed Mojgani as the 10th Oregon poet laureate.

== Personal life ==
Mojgani is a member of the Baháʼí Faith and participated in the Black Men's Gathering initiative across 2003–2010 including trips for the religion to Brazil and a youth leadership meeting in the U.S.

== Books ==
- In the Pockets of Small Gods (Write Bloody Publishing, 2018; ISBN 1938912845)
- The Pocketknife Bible: The Poems and Art of Anis Mojgani (Write Bloody Publishing, 2015; ISBN 978-1938912528)
- Songs From Under the River: A collection of early and new work (Write Bloody Publishing, 2013; ISBN 978-1938912245)
- The Feather Room (Write Bloody Publishing, 2011; ISBN 978-1935904748)
- Over the Anvil We Stretch (Write Bloody Publishing, 2008; ISBN 978-0981521343)
- The Tigers, They Let Me (Write Bloody Publishing, 2023; ISBN 978-1949342512)

== See also ==
- Poetry Slam, Inc.
