= Faylita Hicks =

American poet (born 1985)

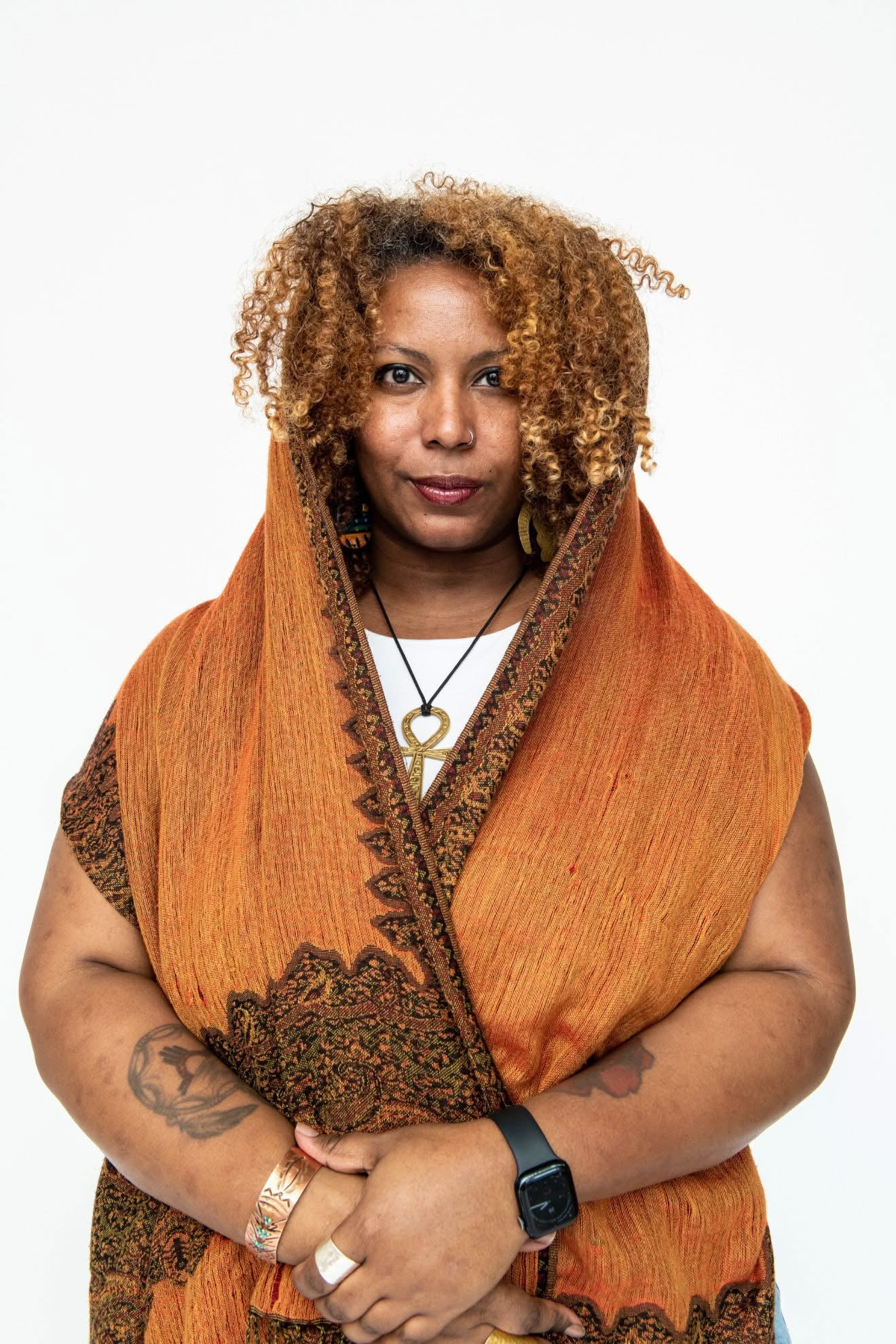
- Hicks in 2025
- Born: 1985 (age 40–41)
- Education: Sierra Nevada University (MFA); Texas State University (BA)
- Occupation: Poet
- Writing career
- Notable works: HoodWitch; A Map of My Want
- Notable awards: Lambda Literary Award for Bisexual Poetry finalist (2020); Midwest Book Award for General Poetry (2025)

Faylita Hicks (born 1985) is an American poet and author of the poetry collections HoodWitch and A Map of My Want. HoodWitch was a finalist for the 2020 Lambda Literary Award for Bisexual Poetry, and A Map of My Want won a 2025 Midwest Book Award.

== Life and career ==
Hicks was born in south-central California and raised in central Texas. They earned a BA from Texas State University and an MFA from Sierra Nevada University. Hicks teaches in the low-residency creative writing MFA program at the University of Nevada, Reno. In 2025–2026, they serve as core faculty in poetry at StoryStudio Chicago. They were a 2021 Shearing Fellow at the Black Mountain Institute.

Hicks's poems and essays have appeared in Poetry, The American Poetry Review, The Kenyon Review, and other literary publications. Hicks previously served as editor-in-chief of Borderlands: Texas Poetry Review.

Hicks has written and organized around pretrial detention and cite-and-release policy in Texas. In a 2019 essay for The Texas Observer, they wrote about being held for 45 days in pretrial detention in the Hays County Jail; the essay later became the basis for the Independent Lens short documentary 45 Days in a Texas Jail. In 2023, the Vera Institute of Justice quoted Hicks in its coverage of San Marcos's cite-and-release ordinance, which required police to issue citations rather than make arrests for some low-level offenses.

== Reception ==
=== HoodWitch ===
Hicks's debut collection HoodWitch received attention from critics. In RHINO, Emily Pérez described the book as a debut centered on "Gawd", a figure through which the collection addresses Haitian Vodou, personal trauma, and public violence. In The Rupture, Deborah Bacharach read the collection as a work of spiritual action. In an essay in West Branch that considered HoodWitch alongside other books, Kathryn Nuernberger described the collection as reclaiming witchcraft as a Black diasporic and feminist source of authority and called it, "at its core," a book of "protection spells for girls".

=== A Map of My Want ===
In the Chicago Review of Books, Emily Sipiora described A Map of My Want as centered on desire and grief, noting that Hicks uses the link between wanting and lacking to address both personal and political concerns. Sipiora wrote that the collection complements Hicks's activism.

== Works ==
=== Poetry collections ===
- HoodWitch (Acre Books, 2019)
- A Map of My Want (Haymarket Books, 2024)

== Awards and honors ==
- 2020 Lambda Literary Award for Bisexual Poetry finalist, for HoodWitch
- 2020 Sappho Prize, first place, for the poem "I Tried Dating Again"
- 2025 Writing Freedom Fellowship, awarded by Haymarket Books and the Mellon Foundation
- 2025 Midwest Book Award for General Poetry, for A Map of My Want
- 2025 Chicago Writers Association Book of the Year Award for Poetry, for A Map of My Want
