= Midwest Independent Publishers Association =

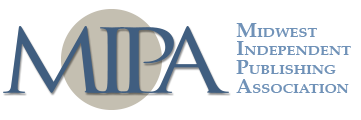
- Website: Midwest Independent Publishers Association

Founded in 1984, the Midwest Independent Publishers Association, or MIPA, is a nonprofit organization based in Minneapolis, Minnesota and serving 12 states. The association serves the Upper Midwest small press community through education, Business networking, and Community recognition. MIPA's members include printers, distributors, editors, indexing professionals, artists, and designers. MIPA is a regional affiliate of the Independent Book Publishers Association (IBPA).

Since 1990, MIPA has sponsored the Annual Midwest Book Awards in the categories of the arts, autobiography, biography, business, children (children's literature, non-fiction, picture book), young adult (young adult fiction, non-fiction), hobbies, education, family, fiction (science fiction, literary, mystery fiction, romance novel, anthology), health, history, humor, inspirational fiction, nature writing, poetry, recreation, philosophy, culture, and design (book cover, interior book design, book illustration, and total book design).

In 2010, MIPA awarded the first Pat Bell Award in honor of former board of directors member Pat Bell, who also served on the board of the Independent Book Publishers Association and focused on advocacy for small press.
