= Buddy Wakefield =

American poet and spoken word artist

- Born: Kenneth Zane Beasley III; June 4, 1974 (age 52); Shreveport, Louisiana
- Occupations: Spoken Word Performer, Poet, Actor, Screenwriter, Recording Artist
- Writing career
- Years active: 1999-present
- Genre: Poetry
- Notable works: A Choir of Honest Killers, Gentleman Practice, Stunt Water, Run on Anything, Live at the Typer Cannon Grand
- Movement: Poetry Slam
- Website: buddywakefield.com

Buddy Wakefield (born June 4, 1974) is an American poet, three-time world champion spoken word artist, and the most toured performance poet in history. His latest works have been released by Righteous Babe Records (album) and Write Bloody Publishing (books). He has lived in Sanborn, New York, Baytown, Texas, Seattle, Washington, Los Angeles, California, and currently lives in Porto, Portugal.

== Biography ==
Buddy Wakefield (born Kenneth Zane Beasley III) was born in Shreveport, Louisiana and raised in Baytown, Texas. Upon being adopted by a stepfather in 1979, his name was changed to Buddy Marshall Stevens before finally becoming Buddy Wakefield in 2003.

In 2001, he left his position as an executive assistant for a biomedical firm in Gig Harbor, Washington, sold or gave away everything he owned, and moved into a Honda Civic to tour North American poetry venues.

In 2004 and again in 2005, Buddy Wakefield won the Individual World Poetry Slam Championship title, becoming the first poet to win the title two consecutive years. Wakefield has been a member of several poetry slam teams, including Team Seattle in 2006 and 2007. When asked about his thoughts on "Poetry Slam" and "Slam Poetry," Wakefield responded:

"Poetry Slam" is an effective gimmick to get folks excited about poetry. It’s the competitive art of spoken word. It’s a competition, judged and so on. It’s accessible to everyone, and a great starting point for many... It’s an event available to every voice, no exclusions ... I’ve been watching at close range since 1998. The styles of the poems entered into Poetry Slams are clearly infinite in scope.

In addition to touring the world solo, Wakefield has also been a core member of several traveling poetry groups, including 2007's Solomon Sparrow's Electric Whale Revival, 2008's Junkyard Ghost Revival, 2009's Elephant Engine High Dive Revival and 2010's Night Kite Revival, where he shared the stage with poets such as Derrick Brown, Anis Mojgani, Andrea Gibson and Cristin O'Keefe Aptowicz, among others. Wakefield has performed his poetry in every state in the U.S. except North Dakota. On purpose.

== Poetry, Performance, Books and Records ==
Wakefield was the first author released on Write Bloody Publishing founded by Derrick C. Brown. He has published five subsequent books with Write Bloody Publishing: Some They Can't Contain (2004, originally The Wordsmith Press; reissued by Write Bloody Publishing), Live for a Living (2007, Write Bloody Publishing), Gentleman Practice (2011, Write Bloody Publishing) and Stunt Water: The Buddy Wakefield Reader 1991-2011 (2015, Write Bloody Publishing).

Wakefield and Stephen Snook have published an entertaining table book on chicken rearing: Henhouse: The International Book for Chickens and Their Lovers (2012, Write Bloody Publishing) ISBN 978-1-938912-05-4

Wakefield has also released three full-length spoken word albums with producer Jon Berardi: A Stretch of Presence (1999) (co-produced with Levi Lyman), Run On Anything (2006) which was released by Strange Famous Records, and Live at the Typer Cannon Grand (2009) which was released by Ani DiFranco's Righteous Babe Records. DiFranco first became aware of Wakefield when her mother saw him perform at an art gallery in Buffalo, NY and gave DiFranco a print-out of Wakefield's website, saying, "You have to do something with this guy." The album contains recordings of live performances, including several from Wakefield's numerous times on tour with DiFranco, as well as one studio-produced track.

== The Poetry Revival Tours ==
In 2007, Wakefield began touring annually with Derrick C. Brown and Anis Mojgani, calling their group “The Poetry Revival.” Each year, the group invited other popular performance poets and musicians to join them for certain legs of the tour, and altered the name slightly to reflect the changing line-up. 2007 was known as Solomon Sparrow's Electric Whale Revival. 2008 was known as Junkyard Ghost Revival. 2009 was known the Elephant Engine High Dive Revival. And 2010 was known as the Night Kite Revival.The Poetry Revival. These poetry events were performed to large, enthusiastic crowds all across the United States.

== Influence ==
Wakefield has had a profound impact on the contemporary Poetry Slam movement, both in his performance and writing style as well as how he has conducted his career. In her book, Words in Your Face: A Guided Tour Through Twenty Years of the New York City Poetry Slam, author Cristin O'Keefe Aptowicz named Wakefield as "the modern poetry slam role model." She wrote,

...[Wakefield] sold everything he owned and toured the country, living out of his car when he wasn't crashing on couches. He was not the first slam poet to do this and certainly not the last, but he was definitely the most high-profile, and he really set the stage for what I like to call the "Troubadour Movement" in slam, the whole desire simply to tour, to reach out and be with your community.

== Discography ==
- Live at the Typer Cannon Grand (Righteous Babe Records, 2009) OCLC 670442318 (CD), ASIN B0062IMHVY (MP3)
- Run On Anything (Strange Famous Records, 2006) Run On Anything at Discogs Run On Anything on iTunes
- A Stretch of Presence (Independently released, 1999) no ISBN

== Bibliography ==
- A Choir of Honest Killers, Write Bloody Publishing, 2019 ISBN 978-1949342-01-7
- Henhouse: The International Book for Chickens and Their Lovers, Write Bloody Publishing, 2012 ISBN 978-1-938912-05-4
- Gentleman Practice, Write Bloody Publishing, 2011 ISBN 978-1-935904-10-6
- Live for a Living, Write Bloody Publishing, 2007 ISBN 978-0-9789989-5-0
- Some They Can't Contain, The Wordsmith Press, 2004 ISBN 1-893972-16-X
- Some They Can't Contain, Write Bloody Publishing, 2004 ISBN 978-0978998936
- Stunt Water: The Buddy Wakefield Reader 1991-2011, Write Bloody Publishing, 2015 ISBN 978-1938912603, 978-1938912610

=== Anthologies ===
- Elephant Engine High Dive Revival, Write Bloody Publishing, 2008 ISBN 978-0982148891
- Junkyard Ghost Revival, Write Bloody Publishing, 2008 ISBN 978-0981521367
- The Last American Valentine: Illustrated poems to seduce and destroy, Write Bloody Publishing, 2008 ISBN 978-0978998974
- Spoken Word Revolution Redux, Sourcebook, Inc, 2008 ISBN 978-1402208690
- Solomon Sparrow's Electric Whale Revival, Write Bloody Publishing, 2007 ISBN 978-0978998998
- Freedom to Speak: The Best of the 2002 National Poetry Slam, The Wordsmith Press, 2003 ISBN 978-1893972070
