= Nancy Huang =

American poet

Nancy Huang is an American poet.

== Biography ==
Huang was born in Ohio and raised in Michigan. She moved to China when she was in 4th grade. Huang stayed in China for three years and then moved back to the United States. She received her B.A. in journalism from the University of Texas.

Huang's first book, Favorite Daughter, is divided into four segments that are roughly in regards to: immigration, Shanghai, America and assimilation. She worked on this project for two years before she entered it into the Write Bloody Poetry Book contest. The book won the 2016 Write Bloody Publishing Prize for poetry.

== Awards ==
- 2015 YoungArts Finalist prize
- 2016 Write Bloody Poetry Book contest
- 2017 Andrew Julius Gutow Academy of American Poets Prize
- James F. Parker Award in Poetry
- 2018 Tin House Fellow
- VONA Fellow
- Pink Door Fellow
- Finalist in the Regent's Outstanding Arts & Humanities Award
