= Karyna McGlynn =

American poet

- Born: Austin, Texas, U.S.
- Education: MFA; PhD
- Alma mater: Seattle University; University of Michigan; University of Houston
- Occupations: Assistant Professor of Poetry and Translation
- Writing career
- Language: English
- Genre: Poetry
- Notable works: I Have to Go Back to 1994 and Kill a Girl, Scorpionica, Alabama Steve, The 9-Day Queen Gets Lost on Her Way to the Execution, Hothouse.
- Website: karynamcglynn.com

Karyna McGlynn is an American poet and editor associated with spoken-word, New Sincerity, and Gurlesque.

== Biography ==
McGlynn earned a BA from Seattle University, a MFA from the University of Michigan, and a PhD in Literature and Creative Writing from University of Houston with a certificate in literary translation.

McGlynn began as a performance poet in the poetry slam scene in the late 1990s, regularly performing at the Electric Lounge and South by Southwest. The poet was a member of the 1998 and 1999 National Poetry Slam teams representing the Austin Poetry Slam. In 2000, McGlynn moved to Seattle to study musical theatre at Cornish College of the Arts. In 2002, the artist coached the Seattle poetry slam team to a spot on the NPS finals stage and was a Seattle team member in 2003 and an Ann Arbor team member in 2007.

Her first full-length book, I Have to Go Back to 1994 and Kill a Girl, received the Kathryn A. Morton Prize in Poetry and was published by Sarabande Books in 2009. Her second full-length book, "Hothouse" was published by Sarabande Books in 2017. Karyna is the author of three chapbooks, Scorpionica (New Michigan Press, 2007), Alabama Steve (Sundress Publications, 2014), and The 9-Day Queen Gets Lost on Her Way to the Execution (Willow Springs Editions, 2016).

Her work has appeared in many journals, both in print and online, including Ploughshares, FENCE, Ninth Letter, Kenyon Review, Black Warrior Review, AGNI, Witness, and The Academy of American Poets Poem-a-Day.

McGlynn has taught writing, performance, translation, and literature at Concordia University, University of Michigan, Illinois College, University of Houston, University of Wisconsin, and Oberlin College.

== List of works ==
=== Books ===
- 50 Things Kate Bush Taught Me About the Multiverse (Sarabande, 2022)
- Hothouse (Sarabande, 2017)
- I Have to Go Back to 1994 and Kill a Girl (Sarabande, 2009)

=== Chapbooks ===
- The 9-Day Queen Gets Lost on Her Way to the Execution (Willow Springs Books, 2016)
- Alabama Steve (Sundress, 2014)
- Scorpionica (New Michigan Press, 2007)
