= Community recognition =

Community recognition is the acknowledgement by a community or social group of a notable achievement. It is often followed by awards and celebrations, such as the annual Phoenix, Arizona Community Recognition Awards and related breakfast. The core of it is to bring attention to the contributions made to the community.

In The Forms of Capital (1986) Pierre Bourdieu distinguishes between three forms of capital: economic capital, cultural capital and social capital. He defines social capital as "the aggregate of the actual or potential resources which are linked to possession of a durable network of more or less institutionalized relationships of mutual acquaintance and recognition." Thus, community recognition can be defined as a form of social capital.

Recognition by community members, whether by subordinates, peers or superiors, is also part of motivation theory. The reward of an individual creates a positive feedback loop, incenting them, and others who are inspired by their deeds and by the positive reinforcement of the community, to continue contributing, or join in to build upon such efforts.
