= Bowery Poetry Club =

New York City performance space

- BPC
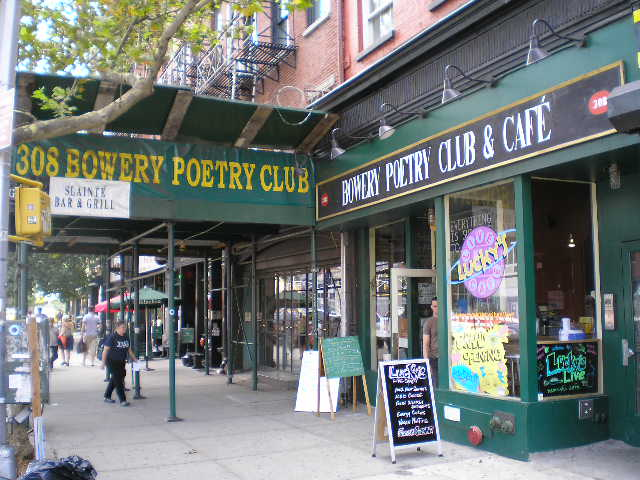
- The front facade of the Bowery Poetry Club
- Interactive map of Bowery Poetry Club
- Location: Manhattan, New York
- Coordinates: 40°43′29.7″N 73°59′33.4″W
- Owner: Bob Holman
- Type: Performance Arts venue
- Events: Poetry, Spoken Word, Slam Poetry, Hip-Hop, Experimental Theatre, Performance Art, Alternative Stand Up, Burlesque, Live Music

Construction
- Opened: 2002

Website
- bowerypoetry.com

The Bowery Poetry Club is a New York City poetry performance space founded by Bob Holman in 2002. Located at 308 Bowery, between Bleecker and Houston Streets in Manhattan's East Village, the BPC is a popular meeting place for poets and aspiring artists.

== Building history ==
The building was built in the 1850s as a lumber yard. Its last incarnation before becoming the BPC was as a formica tabletop manufacturer that ran on DC current. Plywood scraps were used to heat the building in a pot-belly stove.

In a 2002 article about the club in The New York Times, Holman talked about the then-risky choice to open the club on Bowery, which at the time was a "skid row":

The Bowery is a vein of change. Being blind is not the way to retain the aspects of the past that need to be honored. In order to change the world, you have to be in the world. As you get older, the risk of selling out and becoming part of that system stays real but it's mitigated by wanting to get in there and dig... I can't tell if we are making it in the big sense, but we're making an impression.

The Bowery Poetry Club closed for renovations on July 17, 2012 and re-opened in March 2013 as a joint performance venue with Duane Park, which relocated from TriBeCa. In the process, BPC dropped "Club" from its name, becoming "Bowery Poetry". The venue presents Duane Park's burlesque performances Tuesdays through Saturdays, with Bowery Poetry presenting shows on Saturday afternoons, Sundays, and Mondays.

Bowery Poetry is operated by Bowery Arts + Science, a non-profit organization founded by Bob Holman, and run by filmmaker and poet Nikhil Melnechuk.
