= Daniel Gallant =

American theatre producer

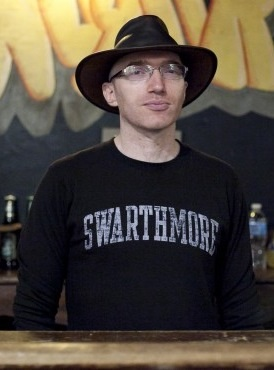
Daniel Gallant

Daniel Gallant is a theatrical producer, playwright, director, lecturer and actor based in New York City, New York. He has served as the executive director of the Nuyorican Poets Cafe and as director of theater and talk programs for the 92nd Street Y; he is also the author of the short story collection Determined to Prove, and the recipient of a 2022 Fulbright Specialist Fellowship and a 2016 Eisenhower Fellowship. His writing has appeared in The Wall Street Journal, Time Out, the New York Daily News and the New York Post. Gallant is a lecturer and consultant in the fields of institutional marketing, social media and arts technology. Forbes called Gallant a "social media expert". NPR's Planet Money podcast called him "a genius at raising money for artists". According to The Wall Street Journal, "since late 2009, Mr. Gallant has exploited expanding social-media tools to grow the cafe from a small, volunteer-led venue best known for weekly poetry events to a thriving arts center with partnerships across the city".

== Education and early career ==
Gallant grew up in Rockville, MD and attended Sidwell Friends school in Washington, D.C. After graduating from Swarthmore College in 1998, Gallant moved to New York City and worked at talent agency ICM Artists. Gallant produced and directed a number of small theater productions in New York. He received a master's degree in arts administration from Columbia University, and subsequently began working as Director of Theater Programming at the 92nd Street Y's Makor Center.

While at Makor, Gallant curated performances, readings and workshops of numerous plays and musicals. He created the Festival of 'Wrights, a theater series that premiered new work by such artists as Mark O'Donnell, Warren Leight and Craig Lucas and included readings featuring David Strathairn, Dan Hedaya, Paul Rudd, Martha Plimpton and other notable performers. He also moderated on-stage interviews featuring Tony Kushner, Wendy Wasserstein, Norman Mailer, Peter Falk, Neil LaBute, Chazz Palminteri, Liz Swados and other artists.

Gallant curated theater and talk events and taught classes at the 92nd Street Y's downtown Manhattan venue, 92YTribeca.

In 2007, Gallant produced and directed Five Story Walkup, a four-week benefit for the 13th Street Repertory Theatre; the show included premier stagings of short plays and monologues by Neil LaBute, John Guare, Quincy Long, Clay McLeod Chapman, Laura Shaine Cunningham and Daniel F. Levin., The monologues and plays that constitute "Five Story Walkup" were published in the anthology THE BEST AMERICAN SHORT PLAYS 2007–2008 by Applause Books in August 2009. In 2010, Gallant produced Seven Card Draw, a benefit for Dixon Place; this show featured premier stagings of short dramatic works by LaBute, Guare and the other authors who had contributed to Five Story Walkup, as well as a performance by Piper Perabo. The monologues and plays that constitute "Seven Card Draw" were published in the anthology THE BEST AMERICAN SHORT PLAYS 2009–2010 by Applause Books in August 2011. In 2014, Gallant produced "Nine Signs of the Times", a benefit for the Nuyorican Poets Cafe; this show featured premier stagings of short works by LaBute, Guare, Caridad Svich, Halley Feiffer, and the other authors who had contributed to "Five Story Walkup" and "Seven Card Draw". The dramatic works featured in "Nine Signs of the Times" were subsequently published in the anthology THE BEST AMERICAN SHORT PLAYS 2013–2014 by Applause Books in June 2015.

Between 2007 and 2008, Gallant produced several off-Broadway plays and musicals at the DR2 Theatre in Union Square, including the off-Broadway premiere of David Brandes' and Joseph Telushkin's play The Quarrel (based on their 1991 film of the same name) and the musical Ogden Nash's The Tales of Custard the Dragon (by Bradford W. Ross and Danny Whitman).

Gallant also co-produced the long-running rock musicals Soul Searching and Generations, and he curated and hosted the multi-venue performance/reading series Acoustic Theater.

== At the Nuyorican Poets Cafe ==
In spring of 2008, Gallant was appointed as the new executive director of the Nuyorican Poets Cafe, a renowned multi-arts venue located in Manhattan's east village. Gallant joined the Cafe just before its 35th Anniversary Celebration, a concert event at Manhattan's Town Hall.

Since Gallant's appointment, the Cafe's operating budget has more than doubled, as has event attendance. Gallant's management efforts have focused on modernizing and expanding the operations of the Cafe while maintaining its artistic and cultural traditions.

Under Gallant's leadership, the Cafe has raised more than $10 million in capital funding; the funds will be used to renovate the Cafe's East Village building.

Gallant has also significantly expanded the Cafe's online presence. According to The Wall Street Journal, "since late 2009, Mr. Gallant has exploited expanding social-media tools to grow the cafe from a small, volunteer-led venue best known for weekly poetry events to a thriving arts center with partnerships across the city. Through strategic use of Facebook, Twitter and a $10,000-per-month grant from Google, he said he has boosted online ticket sales by 30% and web traffic by 40%, and doubled the number of events from around one per evening to two or more".

== Lecturing and consulting ==
Gallant lectures and consults in the fields of institutional marketing, social media and arts technology. He has delivered lectures and speeches about these topics for corporate, non-profit and educational organizations including the Kennedy Center, BAM, Opera America, Bloomberg Philanthropies, Google, Chase, the Lower Manhattan Cultural Council, Foursquare, the Devos Institute, Columbia University, NYU, Fourth Arts Block and other entities.

In 2022, he received a Fulbright Specialist Fellowship to lecture and consult about digital media strategies for academic and creative projects in Leiria, Portugal.

== In popular media ==
Gallant is regularly quoted in The New York Times, The Wall Street Journal, the Los Angeles Times and other periodicals. His quotes usually appear in articles about the contemporary poetry scene, the changing nature of New York City's East Village, popular poets and social media. He has also written opinion pieces and reviews for The Wall Street Journal, New York Post, Time Out New York and other media outlets.

Among the notable articles that feature his quotes are a 2018 New York Times article about the Cafe's history, a 2016 Wall Street Journal article about the Cafe's expansion and two 2015 New York Times articles, one about the cultural resurgence of snapping as a form of audience appreciation and another about spoken word programs that engage people who are serving time. In both a 2017 Wall Street Journal article and a 2017 feature from NPR, Gallant discusses the political nature of many performances at the Cafe. In a 2017 New York Times article about housing and rent issues in New York City, Gallant explains how short-term housing arrangements helped facilitate the early stages of his arts career. In New York's 2016 list of "Reasons to Love New York", Gallant is quoted as follows, about the Cafe's use of grant funds to expand cultural offerings: "Success is often described as turning art into numbers, but the reverse of turning numbers into art is its own craft".

Gallant has appeared on several TV shows. In 2013, he was featured in an episode of MTV's reality series "Washington Heights". He appeared in an NBC news segment about Alphabet City in 2012. He has appeared on NY1 multiple times, most notably in interviews broadcast in 2012, 2013 and 2014. Gallant also appeared on the public affairs TV show Chasing News in 2016.

In September 2013, Gallant was interviewed on Univision's Sal y Pimienta show, during a segment about education and the Nuyorican Poets Cafe. In June 2017, Gallant was interviewed about the Nuyorican Poets Cafe on CNN's series United Shades of America, during an episode that focused on Puerto Rico. In 2018, PBS NewsHour featured Gallant in an article about poetry and identity.

In April 2013, the New York Post published an editorial by Gallant; the editorial explored economic trends that threaten New York City arts venues. In June 2017, the Huffington Post published an article by Gallant that examines how cultural organizations in Spain and Japan use arts activity to increase community engagement. This article was subsequently reprinted in the Social Innovations Journal.

In 2017, Forbes featured Gallant in two articles, one of which highlighted his use of social media marketing techniques to expand the Nuyorican Poets Cafe, and the other of which explored the topic of social media regulation.

In 2018, The Wall Street Journal published three op-ed articles by Gallant; the first article examined the outsized cultural and economic power of Facebook's algorithms; the second article explored how poker strategy and game theory are relevant to social media success; and the third article discussed the flaws and repercussions of Facebook's censorship rules.

== During COVID-19 pandemic ==
In May 2020, the New York Daily News published an op-ed article by Gallant, about the challenges faced by small businesses and non-profits seeking emergency aid during the COVID-19 pandemic.

Gallant was also featured in an April 2020 article in The Wall Street Journal about how small businesses have changed their strategies in order to survive during the COVID-19 pandemic, a July 2020 Politico article about how financial issues tied to the COVID-19 pandemic have endangered New York City's nightlife venues, a May 2020 Associated Press article about the gradual reopening of New York City and a July 2020 Time Out New York article that explored how the Nuyorican Poets Cafe is using online programs to amplify Black and Latinx artists during the shutdown.

In June 2020, Literary Hub published an article by Gallant and Alejandro Heredia, about why New York City should support writers of color and cultural programs during the COVID-19 pandemic.

== Awards and professional recognition ==
Gallant was one of 10 American leaders to receive a 2016 Eisenhower Fellowship, as announced by Eisenhower Fellowships Chairman General Colin Powell in September 2015. With support from Eisenhower Fellowships, Gallant traveled to Japan and Spain in 2016 to study how his colleagues in those countries utilize arts programs to engage young people who are on the fringe of traditional educational and social structures. He also investigated creative ways to improve the financial sustainability of arts organizations.

Gallant was one of 50 global arts leaders selected for the National Arts Strategies Chief Executive Program in 2013. Chief Executive Program members worked collectively to explore the cultural sector's critical challenges and develop best practices for the field.

Under Gallant's leadership, the Nuyorican Poets Cafe was named one of 10 semifinalists for the fourth annual New York Times Nonprofit Excellence Awards.

In 2015, Gallant was named to the Advisory Council and Adjudication Panel of the Field Leadership Fund. Gallant is also a founding board member of the non-profit organization Broadway Artists Connection.

In 2016, the New York Foundation for the Arts published a two-part interview with Gallant about his work at the Nuyorican Poets Cafe.

He served as a judge for The 13th and 14th Annual Independent Music Awards in 2014 and 2015, and his contributions helped assist the careers of rising independent artists.

== Plays and other writing ==
Gallant's plays and monologues have been published in four anthologies from Applause Books and an anthology from Vintage Books.

In 2013, Gallant gave a speech that inducted Nuyorican Poets Cafe co-founder Miguel Piñero into the New York State Writers Hall of Fame.

A 2013 article that Gallant wrote about arts entrepreneurship and the value of risk was published both online and in an anthology from Theatre Communications Group.

In 2015, Howlround published an article by Gallant about the impact of arts pricing on gentrification and generational attitudes toward the arts.

In 2015, the blog Shotgun Honey published Gallant's short noir story "Faske and Ayao". In 2014, Gallant's short story "No Medals" appeared in the blog BKNation.

In 2017 and 2018, Gallant wrote reviews of the films Mayhem, Blindspotting and Operation Finale for the magazine Time Out New York.

In summer 2008, Gallant's play Gerald's Method was produced twice in New York (at Center Stage and in the Midtown International Theatre Festival) and nominated by the New York Innovative Theatre Awards for best short script. Gallant's other short works have been staged at venues including Theater for the New City, the Cornelia Street Cafe and Mo Pitkins.

Gallant's play "A Felony in Blue or Death by Poker" premiered at the Nuyorican Poets Cafe in 2011. The play featured a live game of Texas hold 'em, in which underworld characters compete for supremacy.

Gallant has appeared as an actor in multiple productions, including Five Story Walkup, Josephine Undone and Gerald's Method.
