= Susan Somers-Willett =

American poet

- Born: 1973 (age 52–53)
- Spouse: Ernest Cline (m. 2003; div. 2013)
- Children: 1

Academic background
- Education: Duke University (AB); University of Texas at Austin (MA, PhD)

Academic work
- Discipline: English literature Creative writing
- Sub-discipline: Poetry
- Institutions: Carnegie Mellon University; Montclair State University; University of Illinois; University of Texas at Austin

Susan Somers-Willett (born 1973) is an American author and academic working as a professor of literature and creative writing at the University of Texas at Austin.

== Education ==
Somers-Willett earned an A.B. from Duke University, followed by a Master of Arts in creative writing and PhD in American literature from the University of Texas at Austin.

== Career ==
Somers-Willett is the author of two books of poetry: Quiver (Virginia Quarterly Review Series, University of Georgia Press, 2009) and Roam (Crab Orchard Series in Poetry Open Competition Awards, SIU Press, 2006). She is also the author of a book of scholarly criticism, The Cultural Politics of Slam Poetry: Race, Identity, and the Performance of Popular Verse in America (University of Michigan Press, 2009), which was the first scholarly monograph on the poetry slam and which focuses on African American performance in slam and spoken word poetry.

She has taught at Carnegie Mellon University, Montclair State University, and the University of Illinois Urbana-Champaign, where she was an Andrew W. Mellon Postdoctoral Fellow in the Humanities. She currently works at the University of Texas at Austin.

== Personal life ==
From 2003 to 2013, Somers-Willett was married to author and screenwriter Ernest Cline, with whom she has one child.

== Selected works ==
- The Cultural Politics of Slam Poetry: Race, Identity, and the Performance of Popular Verse in America, University of Michigan Press, 2009.
- Quiver Virginia Quarterly Review Series, University of Georgia Press, 2009.
- Roam Crab Orchard Series Open Competition Award, Southern Illinois University Press, 2006.
