= Nuyorican Poets Café =

Forum for Puerto Rican culture in New York City

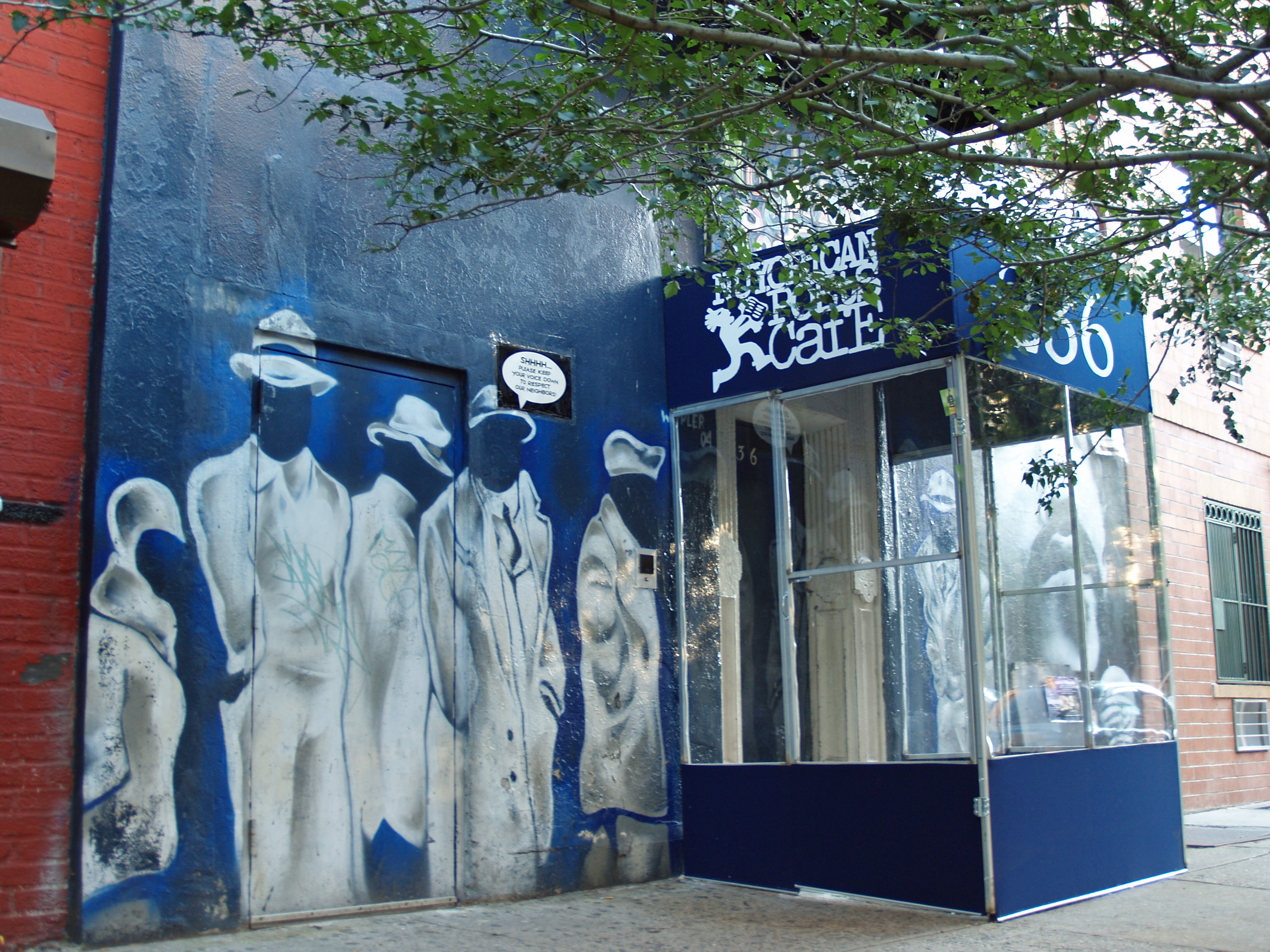
- Nuyorican Poets Cafe building on East 3rd St. in Alphabet City
- Interactive map of Nuyorican Poets Café
- Address: 236 East 3rd Street; Manhattan, New York City, New York; United States
- Coordinates: 40.721951°N 73.9817816°W
- Public transit: New York City Subway: F and <F> trains at Second Avenue

Construction
- Opened: 1975

Website
- www.nuyorican.org

The Nuyorican Poets Café is a nonprofit organization in the Alphabet City neighborhood of Manhattan in New York City. It is a bastion of the Nuyorican (Puerto Rican New Yorker) art movement, and has become a forum for poetry, music, hip-hop, video, visual arts, comedy, and theater. Several events during the PEN World Voices festival are hosted at the Café.

The Nuyorican Poets Café is meant to be a venue from which Nuyorican artists, poets, and playwrights take shared themes and messages of community, understanding, and the breaking down of arbitrary separators of color, among others, and spread them outside the environment of the Café.

== History ==
Founded on 31 October 1973, the Nuyorican Poets Café began operating in the East Village apartment of writer, poet, and Rutgers University professor Miguel Algarín with assistance from co-founders Miguel Piñero, Bimbo Rivas, Pedro Pietri and Lucky Cienfuegos.

By 1975, the number of poets involved with the venture outgrew that space, so Algarín rented an Irish pub, the Sunshine Café on East 6th Street, and they named it "The Nuyorican Poets Café". During the mid-to-late 1970s, some of the featured poets included Miguel Algarín, Miguel Piñero, Pedro Pietri, Victor Hernández Cruz, Diane Burns, Tato Laviera, Piri Thomas, Jesús Papoleto Meléndez, Sandra María Esteves, and José Angel Figueroa. By 1980, the overflow of audiences led them to purchase their current building at 236 East 3rd Street so as to expand their activities and programs. The second wave of major Nuyorican Poets, featured at the Café, emerged, including Nancy Mercado, Giannina Braschi, and Martín Espada.

The Nuyorican Poets Café counts poetry activists such as Bob Holman, Carl Hancock Rux, Saul Williams, Sarah Jones, Emanuel Xavier, and Beau Sia as former slammasters and was the home to the now mobile Nuyorican freestyle battle program Braggin' Rites.

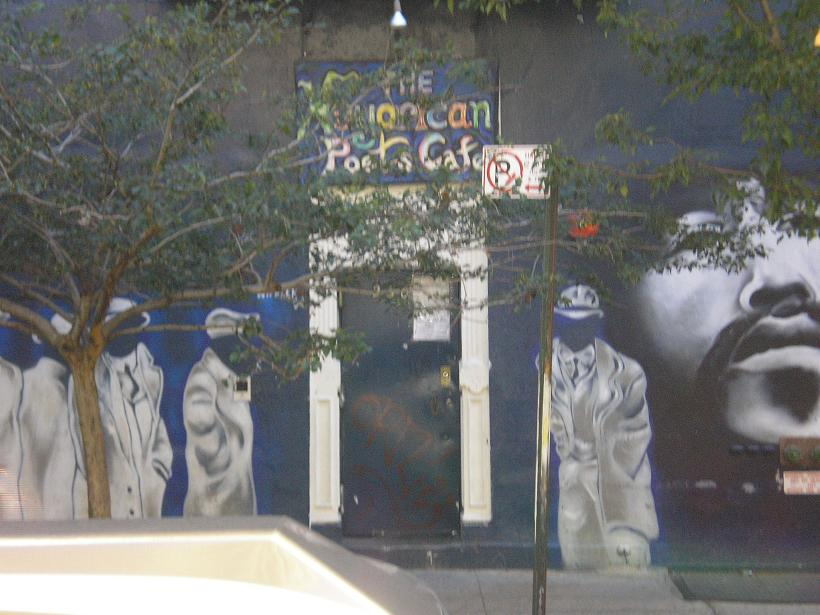
The exterior walls are painted by a local artist "Chico" who has done neighborhood murals for decades. Above the entry doorway hangs Diana Gitesha Hernandez's acrylic painting.

In explaining the philosophy of the venture, co-founder Algarín said: "We must listen to one another. We must respect one another's habits and we must share the truth and the integrity that the voice of the poet so generously provides."

In the 1990s a new group of Nuyorican poets and performing artists emerged to read at the Café. In 2008, Daniel Gallant was appointed executive director.

In 2015, Carmen was the first full-length opera shown at the Café, produced by IconoClassic Opera. In 2022, long-time Cafe regular Caridad de la Luz was appointed Executive Director of the organization, a role in which she still serves as of Summer 2025.

In 2024, the Nuyorican Poets Café announced a $24.1 million renovation of its venue, which is expected to be completed in Fall of 2026. The project involves replacing the existing interiors with a new lobby, two theaters, dressing rooms, classrooms, and the addition of an elevator.

== The Open Room ==
The Open Room idea was the basis of the Café at its beginning. It was a space for poets and other kinds of artists to present their work to an audience. It has become a weekly event since at the Café, attracting all kinds of poets who sign up on a first come, first go basis.

At some point in its early history, a Nuyorican chant emerged to precede the Open Room slam performances as a transition from the intense dancing present at the Café into a more quiet listening experience.

The Open Room typifies the Café, its open-to-all attitude and accepting environment. Anyone can perform and the entirety of the Café is meant to listen.

== Nuyorican Poetry and Plays at the Nuyorican Poets Cafe ==
Puerto Rican New York poets, precursing the Café (1964-1974), were heavily involved in political conversation and the poetry coming from these individuals leading up to the founding of the Café dealt with capturing their own overlooked history. It broke poetic convention and centered upon examining the concepts of identity and representation.

From 1982 to 1989, the Café was shut down, but Nuyorican poetry continued through this time to become part of the foundation of a newly forming literary canon. This canon was that of Latin people in the United States. Publication increased both in the United States and Puerto Rico, and this poetry was studied as exemplary of multiculturalism's emerging effects on the formation of literary canons at a time when the question of multiculturalism was a preoccupation.

Nuyorican poetry and plays are both considered a part of the cultural and intellectual Nuyorican movement. The Café was and is a place designed for the active performance of this poetry and these plays. Performance and active audience engagement with the work presented were important to the Café and its environment. The Café played large part in solidifying the Nuyorican movement and the performance element it emphasized reveals themes of visibility and voice. Before and while serving as co-director of the Café, Bob Holman heavily advocated for poetry slam nights at the Nuyorican. He wanted the Café to be a community-oriented space and his own experience with slam poetry as oral, active, engaging, and connecting influenced this choice. Founder, Miguel Algarín, agreed to the suggestion. Slam poetry nights at the Nuyorican drew in large crowds and press soon followed. The Café and the Nuyorican movement works coming out of it began to reach a whole new audience.

The works of Nuyorican poetry and plays coming from the Nuyorican Poets Café throughout its decades share themes, meanings, messages, and motifs. The historical context and social parameters around these have changed throughout the years but they've stayed essentially the same. These include questions of identity and belonging, tolerance and understanding, and visibility and representation. In a book collection of plays, those coming out of the Nuyorican Poets Café theater festival, edited by Algarín, he groups certain plays together. Algarín’s editorial categories include themes of inner city tragedy and politics, gender plays, and hip hop and rap. These are big, essential themes also present in the larger Nuyorican movement.

Algarín also co-edited a similar book collection focused on Nuyorican poetry coming out of the Café. This collection is broken down into time periods. It tracks the thematic changes of Nuyorican works specifically in the 1990s and early 2000s. Nuyorican poetry of the 1990s era was focused on breaking down political, social, cultural, and racial boundaries between individuals and groups in the United States. The early 2000s for Nuyorican poetry was the time period when slam poetry took full root and the living, accessible nature of poetry was solidified.

== In popular culture ==
In 1994, Nuyorican Poets Cafe was the subject of a fourteen-minute documentary entitled Nuyorican Poets Cafe. Directed, produced, and edited by Ray Santisteban, the documentary features founder Miguel Algarín, along with Willie Perdomo, Ed Morales, Pedro Pietri, and Carmen Bardeguez Brown. Nuyorican Poets Cafe won "Best Documentary" at the 1995 New Latino Filmmaker's Festival in Los Angeles.

Also in 1994, founder, Miguel Algarín, and poet and eventual co-director of the Café, Bob Holman, worked together to edit a collection of poetry originating from the Café, titled: "Aloud: Voices from the Nuyorican Poets Cafe." In this collection of Nuyorican poetry, Algarín makes a point that the main purpose of the Café and the poetry it has produced is to show poetry as the living art form it is, in his opinion, and understanding. It tracks the poetry coming out of the Café through the 1990s and early 2000s.

In 1996, the Nuyorican Poets Cafe Poetry Slam Team was the subject of a feature-length documentary entitled SlamNation. Directed by Paul Devlin, the documentary follows Nuyorican poetry slam founder Bob Holman and the poets of the 1996 Nuyorican team (Saul Williams, Beau Sia, Jessica Care Moore and muMs da Schemer) as they compete in the 1996 National Poetry Slam held in Portland, Oregon. The documentary also features performances by Marc Smith, Taylor Mali, and Patricia Smith among others.

In 1997, another collection was published. This one centered around more performance pieces: plays and monologues emerging from the Nuyorican Poets Cafe theater festival. This collection is organized to emphasis a few certain shared themes that define some part of the Nuyorican movement.

The 1998 Spanglish novel Yo-Yo Boing! by Giannina Braschi features a dramatic scene of a Spanglish poetry reading at the Nuyorican Poets Cafe with founder Pedro Pietri who is also a character in the play United States of Banana.

León Ichaso's 2001 film Piñero features reenacted scenes of poetry readings by Miguel Piñero of “Seeking the Cause” and “A Lower East Side Poem”; at the end of the film, co-founders of the Nuyorican Poets Cafe and other prominent poets, including Miguel Algarín, Amiri Baraka, José-Angel Figueroa, and Pedro Pietri, lead a funeral procession and scatter Piñero's ashes on the streets of the Lower East Side.

In 2018, a year after Hurricane Maria devastated Puerto Rico, PBS News Hour featured a special on the diaspora reading at the Nuyorican Poets Cafe, entitled "After Hurricane Maria, Puerto Rican poets ask again what it means to belong".

=== List of poets, artists, and musicians ===
==== Spoken word ====
Major voices in Nuyorican, Latino poetry, and other American contemporary poetry movements have performed at the Nuyorican Poets Cafe, including:

- Miguel Algarín, Founder
- Paul Beatty
- Amiri Baraka
- Giannina Braschi
- Malkia Cyril
- Cheryl B and Daniel Dumile
- Sandra María Esteves
- Shaggy Flores
- Sonia Guiñansaca
- Tonya Ingram
- La Bruja/Caridad de la Luz
- Tato Laviera
- Jesús Papoleto Meléndez
- Nancy Mercado
- Willie Perdomo
- Pedro Pietri
- Miguel Piñero
- Ishmael Reed
- Neil Raymond Ricco
- Carl Hancock Rux
- Ntozake Shange
- Edwin Torres
- Bonafide Rojas

==== Music ====
In June 2002, Nuevo Flamenco guitarists Val Ramos opened for three-time Puerto Rican Grammy nominee Danny Rivera at the Nuyorican Poets Cafe. The club also produces Latin Jazz, Reggaeton, Hip-Hop, and Salsa events. Performers have included:

- Zoraida Santiago
- The Bronx Conexión
- Val Ramos
- Danny Rivera

After a brief hiatus from music, MF Doom began performing open mic events at the Nuyorican under his new moniker.

==== Visual arts ====
The Nuyorican Poets Café produces exhibitions by local Latino artists, including:

- Juan Sanchez
- Rafael Tufino Jr.
- Esperanza Cortez
- Manuel Rivera-Ortiz

== See also ==
- Puerto Rican literature
- Puerto Rican poetry
- Puerto Ricans in New York City
