= Taylor Mali =

American poet

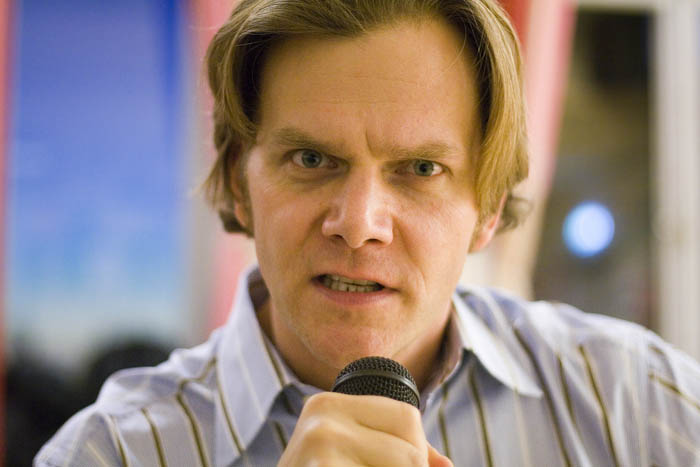
- Taylor Mali in 2005
- Born: Taylor McDowell Mali; March 28, 1965 (age 61); New York City, New York, United States
- Education: Collegiate School
- Alma mater: Bowdoin College; Kansas State University
- Occupations: Poet, humorist, teacher, voice actor
- Spouse: Rachel Kahan
- Writing career
- Notable works: "What Teachers Make: In Praise of the Greatest Job in the World," What Learning Leaves
- Movement: Slam Poetry
- Website: taylormali.com

Taylor McDowell Mali (born March 28, 1965) is an American slam poet, humorist, teacher and voiceover artist.

== Life ==
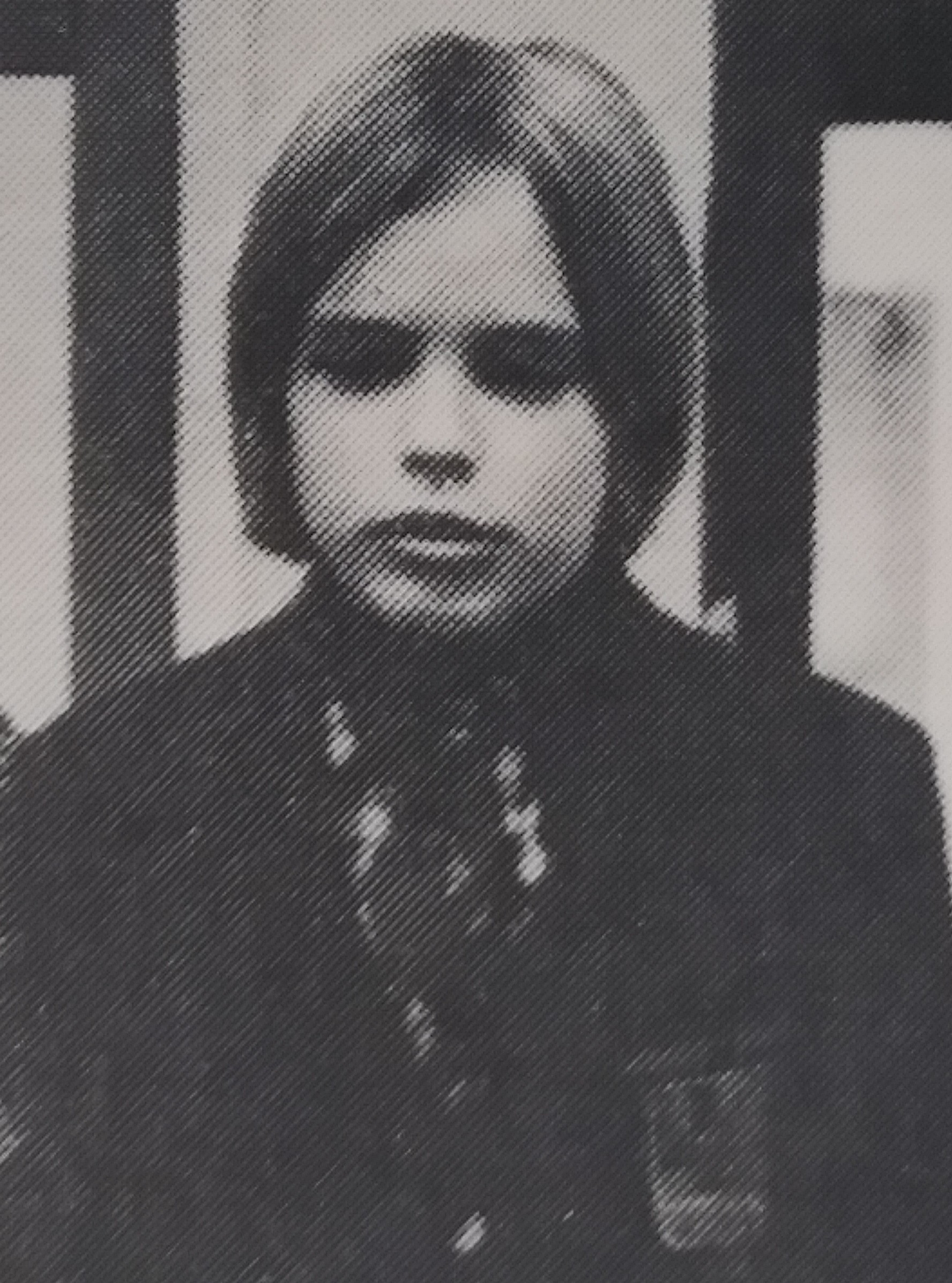
Mali's 4th grade photo in the 1975 Collegiate yearbook

A 12th-generation native of New York City, Taylor Mali graduated from the Collegiate School, a private school for boys, in 1983. He received a B.A. in English from Bowdoin College in 1987 and an M.A. in English/Creative Writing from Kansas State University in 1993. One of four children, his mother was children's book author Jane L. Mali, a recipient of the American Book Award, and his father was H. Allen Mali, vice president of Henry W.T. Mali & Co., manufacturers of pool table coverings. He has married three times. His first wife was Rebecca Ruth Tauber (married in 1993; she died in 2004) and his second wife was Marie-Elizabeth Mundheim (married in 2006; they divorced in 2012). On August 11, 2013, Mali married Rachel Kahan. On January 2, 2015, he became a father to a baby boy, and in 2017 a baby girl.

On January 7, 2021, the New York Times wrote about his mission to retrieve plastic bags trapped in tree branches around his Brooklyn neighborhood, using a metal painters pole with a 21-foot extension, and comparing him to Don Quixote.

== Poetry ==
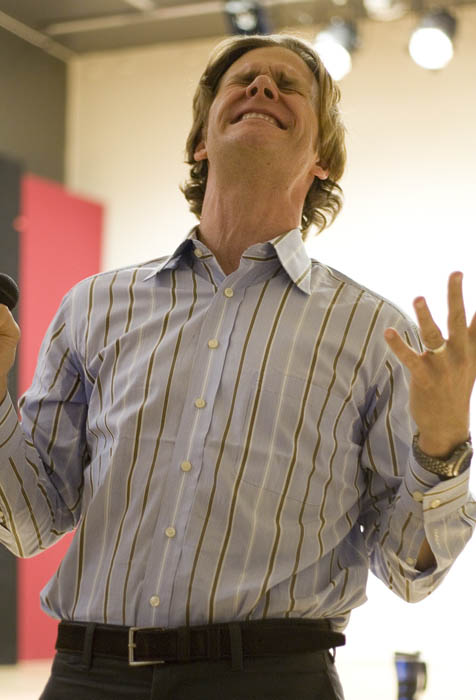
Taylor Mali performing at the international school in Stockholm

As a slam poetry performer, Taylor Mali has been on seven National Poetry Slam teams; six appeared on the finals stage and four won the competition (1996 with Team Providence; 1997, 2000 and 2002 with Team NYC-Urbana). Mali is the author of What Learning Leaves and the Last Time as We Are (Write Bloody Publishing), has recorded four CDs, and is included in various anthologies. Poets who have influenced him include Billy Collins, Saul Williams, Walt Whitman, Rives, Mary Oliver, and Naomi Shihab Nye. He is perhaps best known for the poem "What Teachers Make." The popular poem became the basis of a book of essays, titled, "What Teachers Make: In Praise of the Greatest Job in the World" which was published in 2012 by Putnam Adult.

He appeared in Taylor Mali & Friends Live at the Bowery Poetry Club and the documentaries "SlamNation" (1997) and "Slam Planet" (2006). He was also in the HBO production, "Russell Simmons Presents Def Poetry," which won a Peabody Award in 2003. Taylor Mali is the former president of Poetry Slam Incorporated, and he has performed with such renowned poets as Billy Collins and Allen Ginsberg. Although he retired from the National Poetry Slam competition in 2005, he still helps curate the reading series Page Meets Stage, held monthly at the Bowery Poetry Club. His chapbook, The Whetting Stone, won the Rattle Chapbook Prize for 2017.

== Teaching ==
Taylor Mali spent nine years teaching English, history, and math, including stints at Browning School, a boys' school on the Upper East Side of New York City, and Cape Cod Academy, a K-12 private school on Cape Cod, Massachusetts. He now lectures and conducts workshops for teachers and students all over the world. In 2001, Taylor Mali used a grant from the New York Foundation for the Arts to develop the one-man show "Teacher! Teacher!" about poetry, teaching, and math. He is a strong advocate for the nobility of teaching and in 2000 he set out to create 1,000 new teachers through "poetry, persuasion, perseverance, or passion." He finally reached the mark on April 1, 2012.

== Reception ==
In 2015, Melissa Lozada-Oliva performed the poem, "Like Totally Whatever (after Taylor Mali)" on the final stage of the National Poetry Slam in Oakland, as a rebuttal to Mali's famous poem, "Totally like whatever, you know?". Lozada-Oliva criticized Mali's piece for lacking context, such as how patriarchy impacts women's struggles to speak up. Lozada-Oliva's poem received thunderous applause and secured her team, the House Slam Boston, the championship title that year at NPS. Shortly after the competition, the poem was posted to Button Poetry, which made Lozada-Oliva go viral overnight.

== Published works ==
=== Books ===
- What Teachers Make: In Praise of the Greatest Job in the World, 2012 - ISBN 978-0399158544
- The Last Time As We Are, 2009 - ISBN 978-0982148839
- What Learning Leaves, 2002 - ISBN 1-887012-17-6
- The Whetting Stone, 2017 - ISBN 978-1931307345

=== Audio CDs ===
- Icarus Airlines, 2007
- Conviction, 2003
- Poems from the Like Free Zone, 2000
- The Difference Between Left & Wrong, 1995

=== Anthologies ===
Collections in which Taylor Mali's work is included

- Poetry on Stage: At the Red Barn Theatre, Key West, Danne Hughes, ed. 1995 ISBN 978-1-888036-00-8
- Poetry Nation: The North American Anthology of Fusion Poetry, Regie Cabico & Todd Swift, eds. 1998, ISBN 1-55065-112-9
- Will Work For Peace: New Political Poems, Brett Axel, Ed. 1999, ISBN 0-9666459-1-X
- Bearing Witness, Margaret Hatcher, ed. 2001, ISBN 978-1-56976-130-4
- Freedom to Speak Anthology, Patricia Smith & Debora Marsh eds 2002, ISBN 1-893972-07-0
- The Spoken Word Revolution Mark Eleveld, ed. 2003, ISBN 978-1-4022-0037-3

=== CD Anthologies ===
Collections in which Taylor Mali's work is included

- Attack of the Urbanabots (The Wordsmith Press, 2007)
- New High Score (The Wordsmith Press, 2004)
- Writers Week IX (WWIX, 2004)
- Best of Urbana 2003 (The Wordsmith Press, 2003)
- The Kerfuffle Incident: Best of the Kalamazoo Poetry Slam (KPS, 2003)
- Urbana: Bowery Poetry Club (The Wordsmith Press, 2002)
- Freedom to Speak Anthology(CD) (The Wordsmith Press, 2002)
- Spoken Word Underground (The Wordsmith Press, 2001)
- NYC Slams (Anthology) (PoetCD, 2000)

=== Narration ===
- American Fairy Tales, audiobook, 1998
- Shipwreck at the Bottom of the World, audiobook, 2000
- Hope Along the Wind: The Story of Harry Hay, documentary, 2002
- Blizzard!, audiobook, 2003
- The Great Fire, audiobook, 2003
- Revenge of the Whale, audiobook, 2005
- ESCAPE! The Story of the Great Houdini, audiobook, 2006
- Close To Shore, audiobook, 2007

== Awards ==
- 1996, 1997, 2000, 2002 - National Poetry Slam winning team
- 2001 - U. S. Comedy Arts Festival jury prize for best solo performance, "Teacher! Teacher!"
- 2003 - AudioFile Earphones Award for The Great Fire.

== See also ==
- Performance poetry
- Poetry slam
- Spoken word
- Voice acting
- Bowery Poetry Club
