= Poetry slam =

Competitive spoken-word poetry event

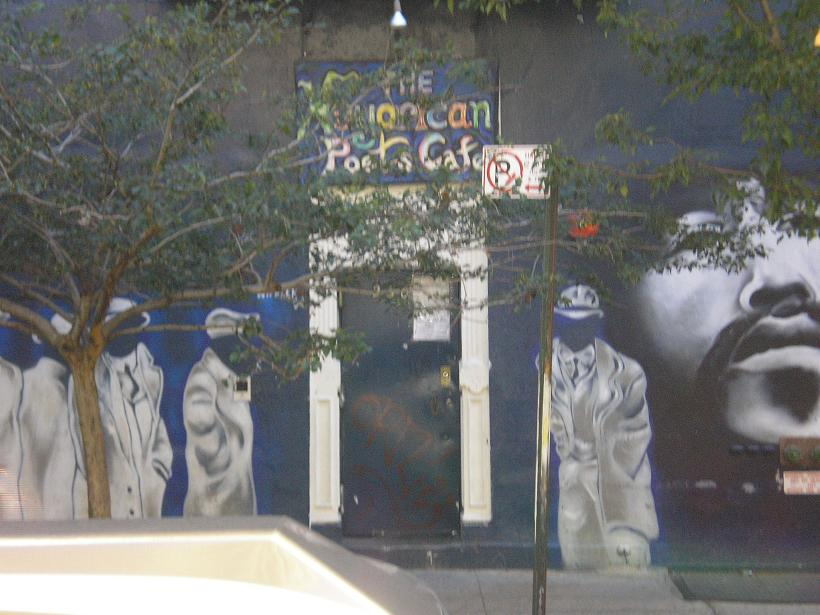
Nuyorican Poets Cafe, New York City

A poetry slam is a competitive arts event in which poets perform spoken-word poetry before a live audience and judges. Some practitioners distinguish between a poetry slam, meaning the competitive event, and "slam poetry", referring more broadly to a performance practice or art form associated with slam.

Poetry slam competitions are held in many parts of the world. Performances are generally judged on both their written content and delivery, and poets may compete as individuals or in teams. Judging is often carried out by a panel, typically of five judges selected from the audience. In many formats, the highest and lowest scores awarded to each poet in a round are discarded. Audience members are commonly encouraged to react through applause, snapping, stomping or verbal responses.

== History ==
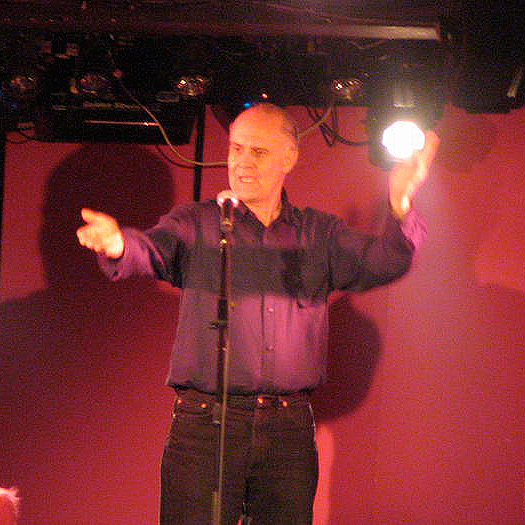
Marc Smith

=== Origins in Chicago and early expansion ===
Modern poetry slam developed in Chicago during the 1980s. American poet Marc Smith, dissatisfied with what he regarded as the formality of contemporary poetry readings, experimented with open-microphone events and competitive audience participation. Smith began organising a Monday-night poetry series at Chicago's Get Me High Lounge in 1984 and developed the poetry slam format at the Green Mill in 1986.

The format soon spread to other American cities. In 1987, the Ann Arbor Poetry Slam was founded by Vince Keuter. In August 1988, the first poetry slam held in New York City was hosted by Bob Holman at the Nuyorican Poets Café.

In 1990, the first American National Poetry Slam took place at Fort Mason in San Francisco, bringing together teams from Chicago and San Francisco and an individual poet from New York.

=== International expansion and institutionalisation ===
During the following decades, poetry slam developed from a network centred primarily on a number of United States venues into an international movement of local scenes, national championships, festivals and transnational competitions. Different communities developed distinct organisational models while retaining variations of the basic principles of live performance, original writing, time limits and audience or jury scoring.

Slam and spoken-word poetry have also entered educational and academic contexts. Berklee College of Music, for example, offers an English minor with a dedicated Spoken Word/Poetry Slam/Performance Poetry track, including courses in spoken word and slam poetry.

== Format and rules ==
Different formats of poetry slam exist throughout the world, and individual organisations may use different scoring and qualification systems. Several conventions, however, are widely associated with the form.

Members of the audience are often selected by a master of ceremonies (MC) to serve as judges, although some competitions use professional juries or other forms of audience voting. Performances are commonly scored on a scale from zero to ten. A typical panel consists of five judges who have no connection to the performers.

Before competition begins, the host will often introduce a "sacrificial" poet whose performance is scored in order to calibrate the judges. The sacrificial poet's score is disregarded and the poet does not compete in later rounds.

A standard slam generally consists of several rounds. Lower-scoring poets may be eliminated after each round; one possible structure is an 8–4–2 format, with eight poets in the first round, four in the second and two in the final. Where five judges score from zero to ten and the highest and lowest scores are discarded, the maximum retained score is 30 points.

Props, costumes and musical accompaniment are traditionally forbidden in many slam formats. The World Poetry Slam Organization's international rules, for example, give performers three minutes and allow only the poet's voice and body, without music, costumes or other external elements. This convention distinguishes standard slam competition from some other forms of performance poetry.

A time limit is characteristic of most competitions. Three minutes is a widely used standard, sometimes followed by a short grace period before point deductions begin.

In an "Open Slam", anyone may register to compete while places remain available, with sign-up often beginning shortly before the event. In an "Invitational Slam", participation is restricted to invited or previously qualified poets.

== Variants and performance practices ==
=== Theme slams ===
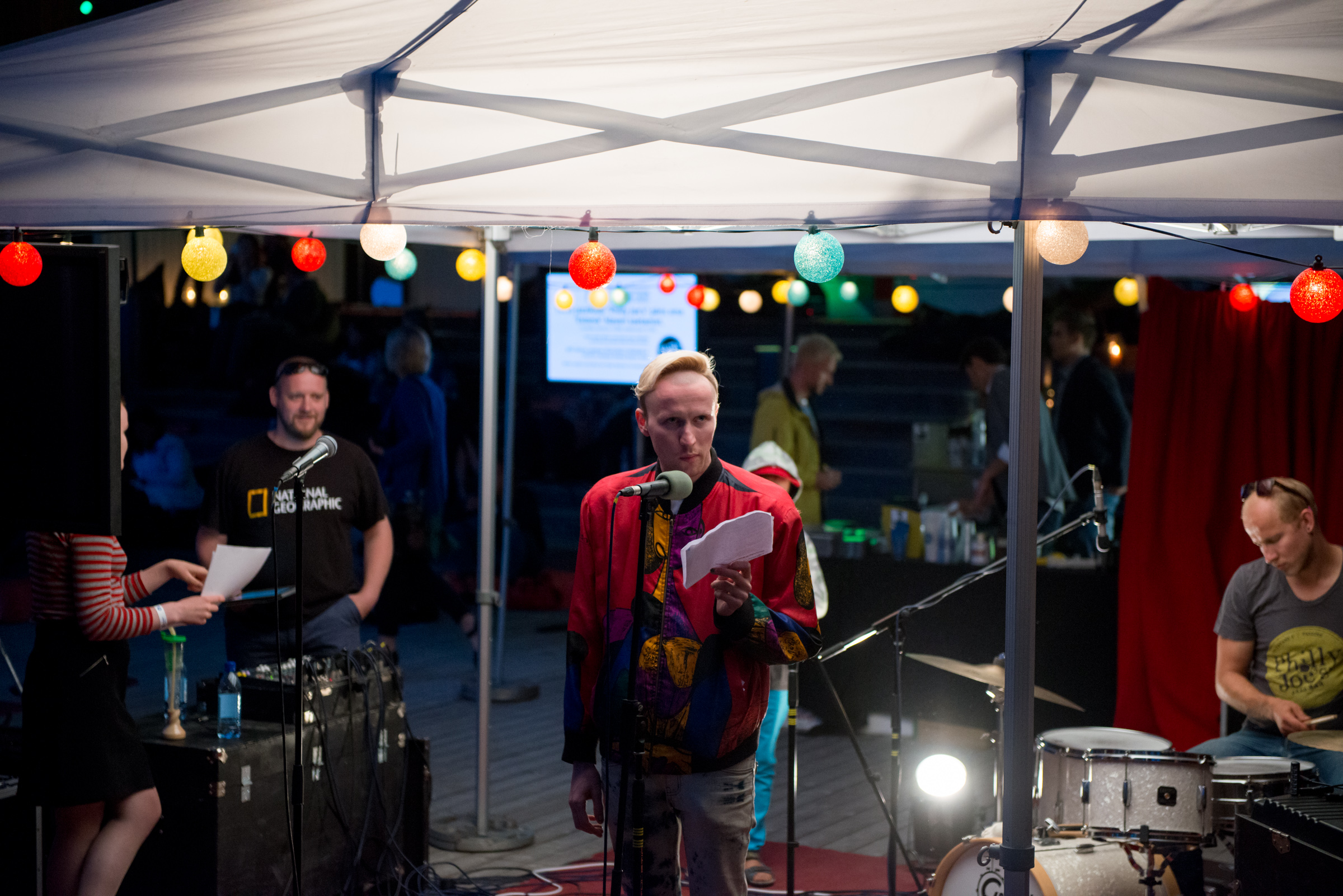
Poetry slam in Paide, Estonia

In 1998, spoken-word poet Emanuel Xavier initiated the Glam Slam through the House of Xavier. The format combined poetry slam with elements of ball culture. In October 1999, Xavier introduced the Glam Slam at the Nuyorican Poets Cafe, with performers competing in categories including "Best Love Poem in Fire Engine Red" and other combinations of poetry, runway presentation and ballroom aesthetics. Later House of Xavier Glam Slams continued at the Nuyorican and other New York venues.

More generally, a "theme slam" is a competition in which performances must conform to a particular theme, genre or formal restriction. Themes may include Nerd culture, Erotica, Queer themes, improvisation, or other conceptual limitations.

Theme slams sometimes modify conventional rules. A "Dead Poet Slam", for example, may require competitors to perform work written by deceased poets rather than their own writing. Other events alter restrictions on costumes or props, as in Swedish "Triathlon" slams that may place a poet, musician and dancer onstage simultaneously. Competitions may also change their judging structure or time limits, as in a "1-2-3" slam with successive one-, two- and three-minute rounds.

Theme slams are also frequently used to encourage participation from demographic groups that may be underrepresented in particular slam communities, including women, younger poets and LGBTQ+ performers.

=== Performative aspects ===
Poetry slams include a broad range of voices, styles, cultural traditions and approaches to writing and performance. Performance poet Hedwig Gorski has credited slam poetry with continuing aspects of ancient oral poetry designed to command attention in communal spaces such as public squares and drinking establishments.

Some poets use forms of vocal delivery associated with hip-hop music and draw on dub poetry, a rhythmic and often politically engaged genre associated particularly with Black and West Indian cultural traditions. Others employ unrhymed narrative structures or theatrical techniques including shifting voices and tones. Some perform in deliberately restrained monotone. Performers may rely exclusively on speech or, where competition rules permit, extend the form through beatboxing, tap dancing or highly choreographed movement.

Styles that dominate at one moment do not necessarily remain dominant. Cristin O'Keefe Aptowicz, slam poet and author of Words in Your Face, described this constant stylistic change:

One of the more interesting end products (to me, at least) of this constant shifting is that poets in the slam always worry that something—a style, a project, a poet—will become so dominant that it will kill the scene, but it never does. Ranting hipsters, freestyle rappers, bohemian drifters, proto-comedians, mystical shamans and gothy punks have all had their time at the top of the slam food chain, but in the end, something different always comes along and challenges the poets to try something new.

Bob Holman, poetry activist and former MC of the Nuyorican Poets Cafe, described the movement as "the democratization of verse". In 2005, Holman also argued that spoken word was being led substantially by women and poets of colour and could contribute voices to public dialogue that were underrepresented in political institutions.

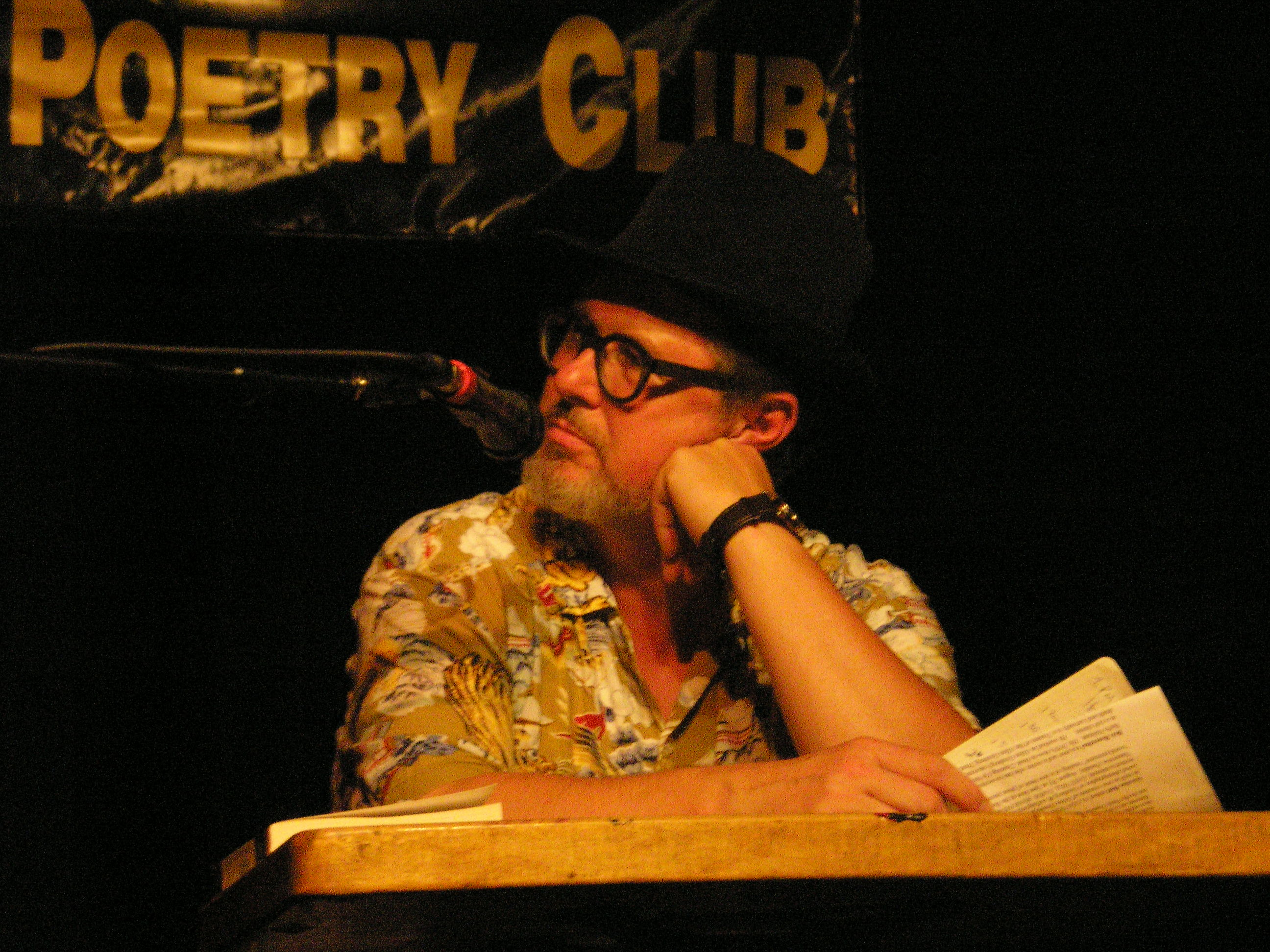
Bob Holman

== Youth poetry slam ==
Slam poetry has become a form of self-expression among teenagers and young adults. Young Chicago Authors provides workshops, mentoring and competition opportunities in the Chicago area. Its youth festival, now known as the Rooted & Radical Youth Poetry Festival and previously as Louder Than a Bomb, developed from a competition first held in 2001.

The San Francisco-based non-profit organisation Youth Speaks has organised the Brave New Voices youth poetry festival since 1998. The youth poetry slam movement was also the focus of an HBO documentary film series released in 2009, featuring poets associated with Youth Speaks, Urban Word, Louder Than a Bomb and related organisations.

In a 2005 interview, Saul Williams praised the youth poetry slam movement:

Hip-hop filled a tremendous void for me and my friends growing up ... The only thing that prevented all the young boys in the black community from turning into Michael Jackson, from all of us bleaching our skin, from all of us losing it, just losing it, was hip-hop. That was the only counter-existence in the mainstream media. That was essential, and in that same way I think poetry fills a very huge void today [among] youth. And I guess I count myself among the youth.

In 2012, more than 12,000 young people participated in the England-wide youth slam Shake the Dust, organised by Apples and Snakes as part of the London 2012 Festival.

In India, An Open Letter to Honey Singh, a rap video featuring Rene Sharanya Verma performing at Delhi Poetry Slam, went viral on YouTube and received more than 1.5 million views.

== International development and competitions ==
As poetry slam spread internationally, local scenes became connected through national championships, festivals and continental and world-level competitions. Because the movement developed in a decentralised manner, different organisations have operated parallel international championships with distinct qualification systems and organisational structures.

=== World-level championships ===
One long-running international competition is the Poetry Slam World Cup (French: Coupe du Monde de Slam), held within the Grand Poetry Slam in Paris since 2007.

A separate international network developed around the World Poetry Slam Championship (WPSC), organised by the World Poetry Slam Organization (WPSO). The organisation was formally founded in September 2022 during the first WPSC in Brussels, following international organising efforts involving national poetry slam communities. Scholarship examining the newer championship has discussed its development in relation to questions of international representation, race, gender and decoloniality.

The WPSC is conceived as an annual travelling championship. Its qualification structure links local and national scenes to continental competitions and, subsequently, to the world championship.

The two competitions have continued to operate independently and in parallel.

Year	Poetry Slam World Cup – Coupe du Monde de Slam (Paris)			World Poetry Slam Championship – World Poetry Slam Organization (travelling)			
Year	Edition	Winner	Final	Edition	Winner	Final	Host city
2007	I	Anis Mojgani (United States)	29 June 2007	—	—	—	—
2008	II	Danny Sherrard (United States)	30 May 2008	—	—	—	—
2009	III	Joaquin Zihuatanejo (United States)	20 June 2009	—	—	—	—
2010	IV	Ian Keteku (Canada)	12 June 2010	—	—	—	—
2011	V	David Goudreau (Québec)	4 June 2011	—	—	—	—
2012	VI	Harry Baker (England)	9 June 2012	—	—	—	—
2013	VII	Simon Roberts (Québec)	8 June 2013	—	—	—	—
2014	VIII	Ikenna Onyegbula (Canada)	7 June 2014	—	—	—	—
2015	IX	Clotilde de Brito (France)	6 June 2015	—	—	—	—
2016	X	Amélie Prévost (Québec)	28 May 2016	—	—	—	—
2017	XI	Evelyn Rasmussen Osazuwa (Norway)	27 May 2017	—	—	—	—
2018	XII	Sam Small (Scotland)	12 May 2018	—	—	—	—
2019	XIII	Jérôme Pinel (France)	1 June 2019	—	—	—	—
2020	XIV	Dani Orviz (Spain)	23 May 2020	—	—	—	—
2021	XV	Giuliano Logos (Italy)	15 May 2021	—	—	—	—
2022	XVI	Lorenzo Maragoni (Italy)	28 May 2022	I	Xabiso Vili (South Africa)	29 September 2022	Brussels, Belgium
2023	XVII	Filippo Capobianco (Italy)	20 May 2023	II	Lady La Profeta (Colombia)	15 October 2023	Rio de Janeiro, Brazil
2024	XVIII	Noférima Fofana (Côte d'Ivoire)	11 May 2024	III	Chevon "Chev" Guthrie (United States)	16 November 2024	Lomé, Togo
2025	XIX	Biff Smith (Scotland)	31 May 2025	IV	King Yaw (Ghana)	1 June 2025	Ciudad Juárez, Mexico
2026	XX	Miss Baker (Chantal Boulanger) (Belgium)	16 May 2026	V	Valerio Moser (Switzerland)	9 October 2026	Durban, South Africa

=== Continental championships ===
==== Europe ====
At the European level, the European Poetry Slam Championship is organised as a travelling continental competition.

Year	Place	Winner
2012	Antwerp, Belgium	Dani Orviz (Spain)
2014	Malmö, Sweden	Zygimantas Mesijus Kudirka (Lithuania)
2015	Tartu, Estonia	Nuno Piteira (Portugal)
2016	Leuven, Belgium	Carmien Michels (Belgium)
2018	Budapest, Hungary	Molnár Péter (Hungary)
2021	Brussels, Belgium	Marie Darah (Belgium)
2022	Rome, Italy	Pablowsky (Spain)
2023	Antwerp, Belgium	Joonas Veelmaa (Estonia)
2024	Košice, Slovakia	Theresa Sperling (Germany)
2025	Berlin, Germany	Valerio Moser (Switzerland)

==== Africa ====
The principal pan-African poetry slam championship is the Coupe d'Afrique de Slam Poésie (CASP; English: Africa Cup of Slam Poetry). The project originated in Cameroon in 2016 and is associated with Cameroonian poet and organiser Baana Enono, known as Faithfull. Contemporary reporting described the competition as a pan-African initiative intended to connect national slam communities across the continent.

The first edition was held in N'Djamena, Chad, from 5 to 10 November 2018 and brought together competitors representing 20 African countries. Senegalese poet Abdourahmane Dabo, known as Al Fàruq, won the inaugural title.

The second edition was affected by the COVID-19 pandemic. Online preliminary rounds were followed by an in-person final in Addis Ababa, Ethiopia, in February 2022. Guinean poet Elhadj Oumar Baldé, also known as EOB, won the championship.

The third edition was held in Bamako, Mali, in 2023. Senegalese poet William Clarence Mendy won the final on 1 December, followed by Deborah Johnson of Nigeria and Symphonie of Guinea.

The fourth edition took place in Conakry, Guinea, from 2 to 5 December 2025 and was won by AriS'LAM of the Republic of the Congo, marking the country's first title and first participation in the competition.

Morocco was selected to host the fifth edition in 2027.

Year	Edition	Host	Winner
2018	I	N'Djamena, Chad	Al Fàruq / Abdourahmane Dabo (Senegal)
2022	II	Addis Ababa, Ethiopia	Elhadj Oumar Baldé / EOB (Guinea)
2023	III	Bamako, Mali	William Clarence Mendy (Senegal)
2025	IV	Conakry, Guinea	AriS'LAM (Republic of the Congo)
2027	V	Morocco	Scheduled

==== Americas: Abya Yala Poetry Slam ====
The principal multilingual continental competition connecting poetry slam communities across the Americas is the Abya Yala Poetry Slam, also known as the Copa América de Poetry Slam or Copa Slam das Américas. An academic interview published by the Federal University of Rio de Janeiro identifies Mexican poet and organiser Comikk MG and Brazilian artist Roberta Estrela D'Alva as its co-founders and describes the project as the spoken-word poetry championship of the Americas.

The network was established in 2020, during the COVID-19 pandemic, while its continental competition was inaugurated in 2021. Its organisers adopted the term Abya Yala as a decolonial alternative to the colonial naming of the American continent and as a reference to Indigenous memory and territorial identity.

The inaugural competition took place in Rio de Janeiro in November 2021 as part of the Festa Literária das Periferias (FLUP), with representatives of 13 countries from North, Central and South America and the Caribbean. Dominican poet Yaissa Jiménez won the first continental title.

The second edition was again held in Rio de Janeiro in 2022 and was won by Canadian poet Eddie Lartey.

The third edition moved to Ciudad Juárez, Mexico, in June 2024, with 16 national or territorial representatives from across the Americas. Cuba finished first, Brazil second and Chile third; Cuba was represented by Yordanis Febles, Brazil by King Abraba and Chile by Amanda Austral.

The fourth edition was held online in March 2026 and was won by Brazilian poet Yastrícia Santos, the first Brazilian winner of the continental championship.

Year	Edition	Host	Winner
2021	I	Rio de Janeiro, Brazil	Yaissa Jiménez (Dominican Republic)
2022	II	Rio de Janeiro, Brazil	Eddie Lartey (Canada)
2024	III	Ciudad Juárez, Mexico	Yordanis Febles (Cuba)
2026	IV	Online	Yastrícia Santos (Brazil)

Abya Yala is a multilingual continental network rather than a Spanish-only competition. Participating communities have included circuits operating in Spanish, Portuguese, English, French, Creole and other languages.

It should not be confused with Slam Diáspora, a Chicago-based competition developed to connect Latinx poets in the United States with poets in Latin America and in which competition poems are performed in Spanish or Spanglish. Slam Diáspora has itself been connected to the wider Abya Yala network.

=== Other international initiatives ===
The Ligue Slam de France designated 26 September 2026 as the first World Poetry Slam Day, with events announced in approximately 50 French cities and in other countries.

== Regional scenes ==
=== Africa ===
The development of slam in Africa has taken place through local collectives, national competitions, festivals and transnational networks.

In 2017, poet Malika Ouattara estimated that there were around fifteen African women slam poets visible within the networks with which she was familiar.

==== Burkina Faso ====
One notable figure in the slam scene in Burkina Faso is Malika Ouattara. In 2019 she established the Slamazone Foundation, of which she is president, in order to support fundraising for social causes in the country.

==== Egypt ====
Scholarship on Arabic performance poetry has identified important Egyptian antecedents in the work of Hussain Shafiq al-Misry and his Halamantishi poetry. According to Muhammad Agami Hassan, al-Misry's varied occupations contributed to his understanding of different social classes, while his knowledge of Arabic literature, grammar, foreign vocabulary and slang informed his poetic practice. Muhammad Ragab Bayoumi discussed his work in the 1986 article Hussein Shafiq al-Misry: Ustaz la Tilmeeth lah ("Hussein Shafiq al-Misry: A Teacher with No Student").

The Arabic expression Ash-Shi'r al-Mu'adda has more recently been used for performance poetry. Poets including Bayram At-Tunisi, Ahmad Rami and Kamel Ash-Shennawy have also been cited as antecedents of later forms of rhythmic and performative poetry in Egypt.

=== Americas ===
==== United States ====
The United States was the birthplace of the modern poetry slam and developed some of its earliest national institutions.

The first American National Poetry Slam was held at Fort Mason, San Francisco, in 1990. It included teams from Chicago and San Francisco and an individual poet from New York. As the form expanded, some poets built careers based on performance and competition and toured nationally and internationally.

In 1999, the National Poetry Slam was held in Chicago. The event received national media coverage, including coverage by The New York Times and CBS's 60 Minutes, which recorded material at the Chopin Theatre.

Several poets who participated in American slam subsequently received major institutional literary recognition. Four poets who had competed at the National Poetry Slam had received National Endowment for the Arts poetry fellowships by 2011:

- Hal Sirowitz, who was on the Nuyorican Poets Cafe Poetry Slam team in 1993, received an NEA Fellowship in Poetry in 1994.
- Jeffrey McDaniel, who competed on several Washington, D.C. and California slam teams in the 1990s, received an NEA Fellowship in Poetry in 2003.
- Adrienne Su, who competed with the Nuyorican Poets Cafe team, received an NEA Fellowship in Poetry in 2007.
- Cristin O'Keefe Aptowicz, who competed with the NYC-Urbana Poetry Slam team in 1998, 2001, 2003 and 2010, received an NEA Fellowship in Poetry in 2011.

In 2017, Tyehimba Jess, who had competed twice as part of Chicago's Green Mill team, won the Pulitzer Prize for Poetry for Olio.

Poetry Slam, Inc. (PSi) formerly sanctioned three major annual competitions for adult poets: the National Poetry Slam (NPS), the Individual World Poetry Slam (iWPS), and the Women of the World Poetry Slam (WoWPS).

As of 2017, the National Poetry Slam featured 72 certified teams and culminated in five days of competition.

The final National Poetry Slam organised by PSi was held in Chicago in 2018, after which the organisation's voting body elected not to hold its three major competitions in 2019. The WoWPS has subsequently continued through a separate organisation and website.

===== Notable American slam poets =====
A number of American poets have been active in both slam and academic or institutional literary contexts:

- Jeffrey McDaniel competed on several poetry slam teams before publishing multiple books and teaching at Sarah Lawrence College.
- Patricia Smith, a four-time national slam champion, went on to receive major literary honours including a Guggenheim Fellowship and an NEA Fellowship.
- Bob Holman founded the Nuyorican Poetry Slam and has taught at institutions including the New School, Bard, Columbia and NYU. Craig Arnold won the Yale Series of Younger Poets Competition and also competed in poetry slams.
- Kip Fulbeck, professor of art at the University of California, Santa Barbara, competed in slam in the early 1990s and initiated a spoken-word course as part of a college art programme's core curriculum.
- Javon Johnson was national slam poetry champion in 2003 and 2004, wrote his dissertation on slam poetry and published scholarship on Black masculinity and sexism in slam and spoken-word communities.
- Susan Somers-Willett wrote The Cultural Politics of Slam Poetry, examining relationships between slam, identity and politics.
- Karyna McGlynn has addressed the relationship between poetry slam communities and academic literary culture in her work.

Henry S. Taylor, winner of the 1985 Pulitzer Prize for Poetry, competed individually in the 1997 National Poetry Slam and placed 75th out of 150 competitors.

=== Europe ===
==== Austria ====
From 10 to 11 December 2016, Salzburg, Austria, hosted a 28-hour poetry slam competition, surpassing a previous 25-hour record set in Nuremberg, Germany. Friedrich Herrmann won, finishing one point ahead of Darryl Kiermeier. The event was organised by Lukas Wagner of Slamlabor and took place in the SN-Saal of the Salzburger Nachrichten.

=== Asia ===
==== Japan ====
In Japan, Katsunori Kusunoki, professor of communications at Toyo University, developed a related competitive format known as "poetry boxing". Kusunoki organised annual poetry-boxing tournaments as a medium for expression, competition and social interaction among students.

In the format described by The Chronicle of Higher Education, sixteen "boxers" face one another in paired three-minute competitions of stand-up verse. Winners proceed through further challenges that can include timed presentations and improvised exchanges. An MC introduces the competitors and gives them stage nicknames. Kusunoki described the format as a way of encouraging students to overcome language barriers and express themselves publicly.

== Criticism ==
Poetry slam has been debated and criticised within both literary and slam communities since its early development.

At the 1993 National Poetry Slam in San Francisco, a Canadian team consisting of Kedrick James, Alex Ferguson and John Sobol wrote, printed and circulated an instant broadside titled Like Lambs to the Slammer. It criticised what they regarded as complacency, conformity and calculated emotionalism within the poetry slam scene.

Critics have also argued that slam may encourage formulaic delivery and have identified a recognisable "slam voice" that they argue can restrict emotional or stylistic range.

In an interview in The Paris Review, literary critic Harold Bloom stated:

I can't bear these accounts I read in the Times and elsewhere of these poetry slams, in which various young men and women in various late-spots are declaiming rant and nonsense at each other. The whole thing is judged by an applause meter which is actually not there, but might as well be. This isn't even silly; it is the death of art.

Poet and King Missile lead singer John S. Hall has also criticised slam, objecting to its competitive structure and what he regards as a lack of stylistic diversity. Recalling his first slam at the Nuyorican Poets Café, Hall described feeling uncomfortable with its resemblance to sport and characterised the form he encountered as highly masculine.

Poet Tim Clare presents arguments both for and against the phenomenon in Slam: A Poetic Dialogue.

Marc Smith himself has criticised commercially successful spoken-word projects such as Def Poetry, arguing that commercialisation could diminish the values of performance poetry.

== See also ==
- Canadian Festival of Spoken Word
- Daniel Gallant
- English literature
- Haikai prose
- Hip-hop
- List of performance poets
- Oral poetry
- Persona poetry
- Postmodern literature
- Prose rhythm
- Purple prose
- Recitative
- Results of the National Poetry Slam
- Nuyorican Movement
- Rhymed prose
- Spoken word
- Saul Williams

== Bibliography ==
- Miguel Algarin & Bob Holman, ALOUD: Voices from the Nuyorican Poets' Cafe
- Marc Smith, Crowdpleaser
- Gary Mex Glazner, Poetry Slam: The Competitive Art of Performance Poetry
- Lisa Buscani, Jangle
- Hedwig Gorski, Intoxication: Heathcliff on Powell Street
- Susan Somers-Willett, The Cultural Politics of Slam Poetry: Race, Identity, and the Performance of Popular Verse in America
- Cristin O'Keefe Aptowicz, Words In Your Face: A Guided Tour Through Twenty Years of the New York City Poetry Slam
- Beau Sia, A Night Without Armor II: The Revenge
- Daphne Gottlieb, Final Girl, Pelt, Why Things Burn, and 15 Ways to Stay Alive
- Douglas A. Martin, In the Time of Assignments
- Glenis Redmond, Backbone, Under the Sun
- Jeffrey McDaniel, Alibi School, The Forgiveness Parade, and The Splinter Factory
- Jessica Care Moore, The Alphabet Verses the Ghetto, The Words Don't Fit in My Mouth, and God Is Not an American
- Justin Chin, Bite Hard, Harmless Medicine, and Gutted
- M. Ayodele Heath, Otherness
- Michael Salinger, Neon, Outspoken, and Well Defined: Vocabulary in Rhyme (with Sam Henderson)
- Patricia Smith, Big Towns, Big Talk: Poems, Close to Death: Poems, Life According to Motown, Teahouse Of The Almighty, and Blood Dazzler
- Rachel McKibbens, Pink Elephant
- Lucy Anderton, the flung you
- Regie Gibson, Storms Beneath the Skin
- Shane Koyczan, Visiting Hours
- Tara Betts, Arc and Hue
- Taylor Mali, What Learning Leaves, and Top Secret Slam Strategies
- Helen Gregory, "The Quiet Revolution of Poetry Slam: The Sustainability of Cultural Capital in the Light of Changing Artistic Conventions", Ethnography and Education, Vol. 3 (1): 61–71.
- Roger Bonair-Agard, Gully and Tarnish and Masquerade
- Saul Williams, The Seventh Octave, she, said the shotgun to the head, and The Dead Emcee Scrolls
- Tyehimba Jess, leadbelly
- Sonya Renee Taylor, A Little Truth On Your Shirt
