= Robin Graham =

Robin Graham may refer to:

- Robin Ann Graham (born 1952), American college student missing since 1970
- Robin Lee Graham (born 1949), American sailor
- C. Robin Graham, American mathematician
- Robin Graham (horn player) (born 1955), American-born French horn player
