= John Marshall High School (Los Angeles) =

Coordinates: 34°6′28″N 118°16′39″W

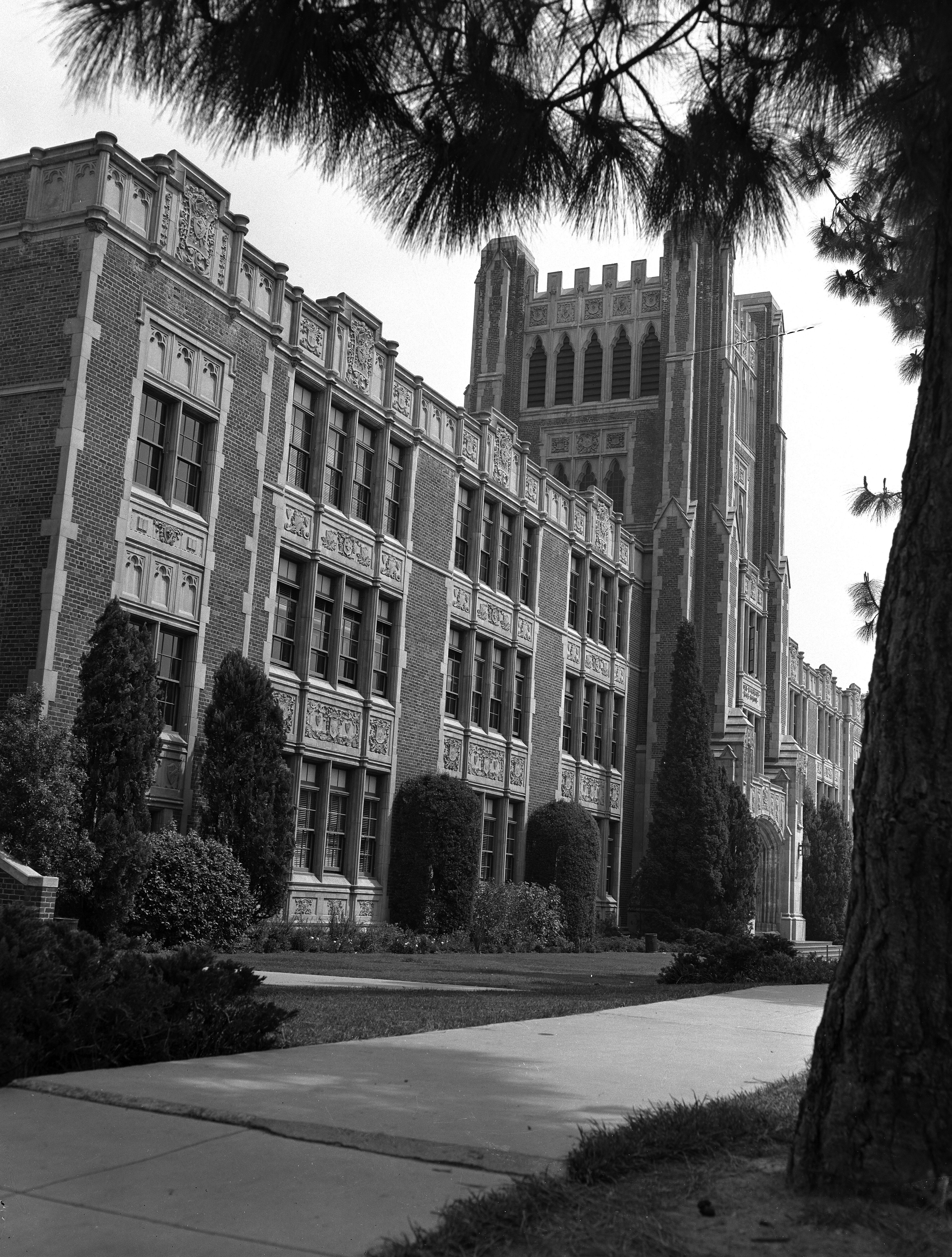
- 3939 Tracy Street; Los Angeles, California 90027; United States

Information
- Type: Public school
- Established: 1931
- School district: Los Angeles Unified School District
- Principal: Juan Puentes
- Staff: 97.49 (on an FTE basis)
- Grades: 9–12
- Enrollment: 1,903 (2023–2024)
- Student to teacher ratio: 19.52
- Colors: Midnight Blue and Sunlight Blue
- Athletics: John Marshall High School Barristers
- Athletics conference: Northern League; CIF Los Angeles City Section
- Mascot: Johnny Barrister
- Rival: Belmont High School
- Website: marshallhs.lausd.org

John Marshall High School is a public high school located in the Los Feliz district of the city of Los Angeles at 3939 Tracy Street in Los Angeles, California.

Marshall, which serves grades 9 through 12, is a part of the Los Angeles Unified School District. Marshall is named after jurist John Marshall, who served as the fourth Chief Justice of the United States for three decades.

Students at Marshall primarily come from Los Feliz, Atwater Village, East Hollywood, Koreatown, Elysian Valley, and Silver Lake.

Within the school, there are many Small Learning Communities, including the School for Environmental Studies, the school's only California Partnership Academy, the Performing Arts Academy, the Artistic Vision Academy, the STARS Academy, the Renaissance Academy, and the Social Justice Academy. The School also houses a School for Advanced Studies and a Gifted/High Ability Magnet.

Marshall has an enrollment of approximately 2,000 students and a teaching staff of approximately 100 (on an FTE basis).

The school's mascot is the "Barrister." The school's service organization is the Continentals. A bust of John Marshall stands in the center of the Senior Court.

== History ==
Designed by architect George M. Lindsey in the Collegiate Gothic style, and constructed in 1930, John Marshall High School first opened its doors on January 26, 1931, with approximately 1,200 students and 48 teachers. Joseph Sniffen, for whom the auditorium was named, served as the Principal, while Hugh Boyd and Geraldine Keith acted as Marshall's first Vice-Principals. The football field was named in Boyd's honor, while the library was named for Keith.

During the first semester of the school's existence, the faculty and students cooperatively selected the school motto, seal, and colors. The school motto, Veritas Vincit (Truth Conquers...), was an easy choice since this was a favorite sentiment of John Marshall. The school seal shows an open Book of Learning, behind which is projected the scales of justice with Veritas Vincit emblazoned on the bar. Two shades of blue became the official colors of the high school; the moonlight blue of midnight and the sunlight blue of dawn. Since the color blue is symbolic of truth, the choice of colors harmonized with the school's motto. John Montapert and Henry Suykida, two Marshall students who graduated in the Winter Class of 1939, composed "Alma Mater", the official school song.

It was in the Los Angeles City High School District until 1961, when it merged into LAUSD.

Following the Sylmar earthquake of 1971, some of Marshall's buildings were condemned. The cafeteria was torn down, but the Los Feliz community, led by "Citizens to Save Marshall" activists Joanne Gabrielson, Alberta Burke, Sherril Boller, and Nina Mohi tirelessly campaigned to save the unique Collegiate Gothic Main Building. In 1975, this building was closed for structural strengthening and all classes moved to temporary bungalows. In September 1980 the refurbished Main Building was opened. A new building now houses the library, cafeteria, and science classrooms. Mike Haynes Stadium, the school's football and track stadium, also dates to 1981.

In one basketball game in 1986 Jerry Simon, who that season was the Section 3-A Los Angeles City Player of the Year, scored 69 points for Marshall, establishing a new single-game scoring record for a high school player in Los Angeles, as the team won by a score of 98–61.

== Notable alumni ==
- Bob Arbogast, Los Angeles talk show host and Chicago disc jockey
- Pete Arbogast, Hall of Fame sportscaster, longtime Voice of the USC Trojans
- Michael D. Antonovich, member of Los Angeles County Board of Supervisors
- apl.de.ap, vocalist, songwriter, producer and rapper for the Black Eyed Peas
- Barry C. Barish, 2017 Nobel Prize winner in Physics
- Karin Booth, film and television actress of the 1940s through 1960s
- John Browning, two time Grammy-winning virtuoso pianist
- Gabriel Chavarria, actor
- Robert "Tree" Cody, Native American flutist
- Lyor Cohen, former CEO of Warner Music Group (WMG)
- Caryl Chessman, known as the "Red Light Bandit", was a cause celebre for the movement to ban capital punishment.
- John Paul DeJoria, co-founder and CEO of John Paul Mitchell Systems and Patrón
- Alexa Demie, singer, actor in Euphoria
- Leonardo DiCaprio, actor, environmentalist(dropped out)
- Mark Dresser, bassist, composer and Professor of Music, University of California, San Diego
- Margarita Engle, poet and Newbery Award winning writer of children's and young adult literature
- Heidi Fleiss, Hollywood madam
- Ed Fredkin, computer scientist, physicist
- Courtney Gains, actor
- Lola Glaudini, actress
- Jo Ann Greer, frequent onscreen singing voice of Rita Hayworth; featured vocalist with Les Brown and His Band of Renown, and on The Al Pearce Show
- Robin Graham, missing person
- Mike Haynes, NFL Hall of Fame cornerback
- Eddie Hodges, actor
- David Ho, physician and 1996 Time Person of the Year
- Carolyn House, 1960 Olympic swimmer, world record holder
- Will Hutchins, actor known as Tom "Sugarfoot" Brewster in 1950s Warner Bros. television series Sugarfoot
- Lance Ito, Los Angeles Superior Court judge famous for the O.J. Simpson trial in 1995
- Sick Jacken, rapper, writer, and producer for Psycho Realm
- Anne-Marie Johnson, television actress and first National Vice President of the Screen Actors Guild
- Alex Kozinski, Chief Judge of the United States Court of Appeals for the 9th Circuit
- Stewart Kwoh, MacArthur Fellow, Founder and President, Asian Americans Advancing Justice
- Dan Kwong, performance artist and playwright (Be Like Water)
- Tom LaBonge, member of the Los Angeles City Council (2001–2015)
- Rosemary LaPlanche, Miss America 1941
- Carol Lin, CNN broadcaster
- Allan Luke, Professor of Education and writer, Queensland University of Technology, Australia
- Mimi Clar Melnick, journalist
- Warren Miller (director), made over 750 films on skiing and other outdoor sports
- Peggy Moran, actress
- Ronn Moss, songwriter and member of Player and actor (The Bold and the Beautiful, assorted films)
- Julie Newmar, actress, known for her role as Catwoman in the television series Batman
- Michelle Phillips, singer and member of the 1960s singing group The Mamas and the Papas
- Andy Reid, three-time Super Bowl-Winning NFL head football coach, Kansas City Chiefs
- Yesika Salgado, poet and co-founder of the poetry collective Chingona Fire
- Joel Seligman, President of the University of Rochester
- Jerry Simon (born 1968), American-Israeli basketball player; set LA single-game scoring record
- Chris Tashima, actor and Academy Award-winning filmmaker (Visas and Virtue)
- Bill Toomey, 1968 Olympic decathlon champion; taught at Marshall
- Hal Uplinger, NBA player Baltimore Bullets 1947–1953, CBS sports and entertainment producer, first to use the instant replay technique still used in TV sportscasting
- Eric Van Young, Professor of History and writer, UC San Diego
- Bob Vickman, American pilot and also served as one of the first pilots in the Israeli Air Force. He died on duty.
- will.i.am, vocalist, producer and songwriter for the Black Eyed Peas
- La Monte Young, composer

== In popular culture ==
- Shots of Marshall have been used for a variety of movies and television series, most notably Grease, La Bamba, Earth Angel (1991 TV film), Buffy the Vampire Slayer (film), Mr. Novak, Bachelor Party, Boy Meets World, The Wonder Years, Smart Guy, Kenan & Kel, Sister, Sister, Grosse Pointe Blank, A Nightmare on Elm Street, Can't Hardly Wait, Supernatural, Boston Public, The Suite Life of Zack & Cody, Cory in the House, Hannah Montana, Pretty in Pink, Good Burger, Garden State, Zapped!, Like Father Like Son, Girls Just Want to Have Fun, Lucas Tanner, Amityville 4, Charlie Bartlett, Slaughterhouse Rock, Cirque du Freak, School of Rock, Home Room, iCarly, Hang Time, Who's the Boss?, True Crime, Amateur, Sierra Burgess Is a Loser, Space Jam, and Highway to Heaven.
- An exterior of the school is shown during Miley Cyrus's Best of Both Worlds Tour during the song "Nobody's Perfect".
- German automaker Audi used the school to film a new commercial, featuring its Audi Q5 crossover SUV.
- The Pharcyde shot their video "Runnin'" both inside and outside the Collegiate Gothic Main Building.
- American rock band Van Halen used the school to shoot the music video for "Hot for Teacher".
- Logic (rapper) shot his video 1-800-273-8255 (song) around the high school campus, namely inside of the main building and on the football field.
- Bebe Rexha "I'm Gonna Show You Crazy" music video incorporates the entrance of the high school and hallway.
- Juice WRLD and Benny Blanco filmed "Graduation" around the campus, which featured stars such as Ross Butler, Madison Beer, and Dove Cameron.
- Season 15, Episode 5 of Grey's Anatomy Betty's high school.

== See also ==
- High schools in Los Angeles
