= Nonformal learning =

Category of learning situation

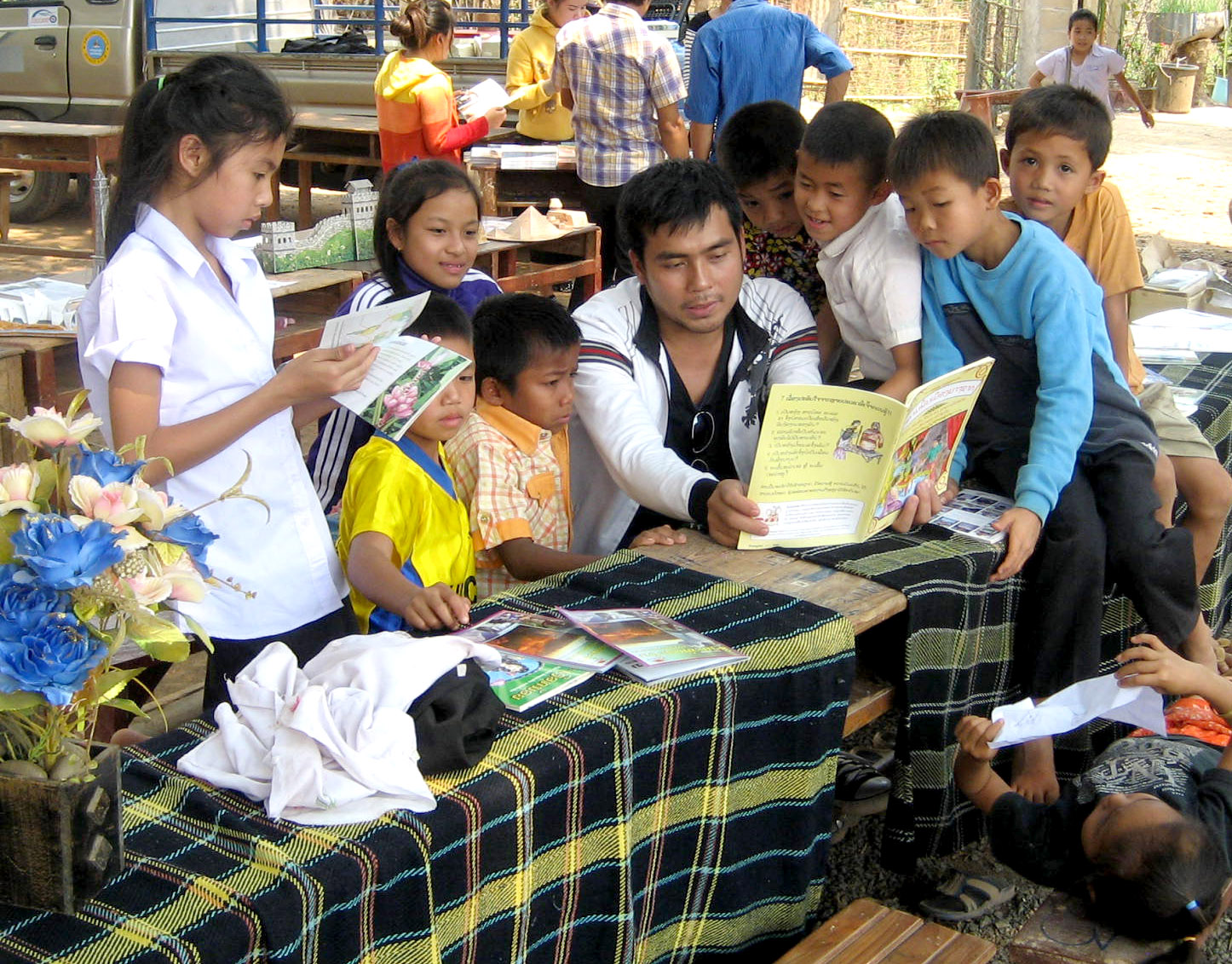
Khamla Panyasouk of Big Brother Mouse in Laos reads to children

Non-formal learning includes various structured learning situations which do not either have the level of curriculum, institutionalization, accreditation or certification associated with 'formal learning', but have more structure than that associated with 'informal learning', which typically take place naturally and spontaneously as part of other activities. These form the three styles of learning recognised and supported by the OECD.

Examples of non-formal learning include swimming sessions for toddlers, community-based sports programs, and programs developed by organisations such as the Boy Scouts, the Girl Guides, community or non-credit adult education courses, sports or fitness programs, professional conference style seminars, and continuing professional development. The learner's objectives may be to increase skills and knowledge, as well as to experience the emotional rewards associated with increased love for a subject or increased passion for learning.

== History ==
The debate over the relative value of formal and informal learning has existed for a number of years. Traditionally formal learning takes place in a school or university and has a greater value placed upon it than informal learning, such as learning within the workplace. This concept of formal learning being the socio-cultural accepted norm for learning was first challenged by Scribner and Cole in 1973, who claimed most things in life are better learnt through informal processes, citing language learning as an example. Moreover, anthropologists noted that complex learning still takes place within indigenous communities that had no formal educational institutions.

It is the acquisition of this knowledge or learning which occurs in everyday life that has not been fully valued or understood. This led to the declaration by the OECD educational ministers of the "life-long learning for all" strategy in 1996. This includes 23 countries from five continents, who have sought to clarify and validate all forms of learning including formal, non-formal and informal. This has been in conjunction with the European Union which has also developed policies for life-long learning which focus strongly on the need to identify, assess and certify non-formal and informal learning, particularly in the workplace.

== Characteristics ==
Nonformal learning is an organized educational activity that takes place outside formal education systems while maintaining intentional learning objectives. It is often described as occupying a middle ground between formal and informal learning. Informal learning occurs naturally through family, culture, and everyday experience, while formal learning typically takes place within educational institutions, follows prescribed curricula, and includes structured assessment. Nonformal learning shares characteristics with both forms of education, combining intentional instruction with flexibility in organization and delivery.

=== Learning may take place in a variety of locations ===
One characteristic of nonformal learning is its flexibility in where and how learning occurs. Learners often have considerable autonomy in determining the objectives, timing, and methods of their learning, while educators may adapt instructional approaches to participants' interests and local needs. Learning activities may include field trips, demonstrations, hands-on experiences, lectures, mentoring, or interactions with professionals and subject-matter experts. Programs may be offered in physical or virtual settings, including sports associations, adult literacy programs, after-school clubs, community organizations, and community-based projects. These settings provide opportunities for experiential, collaborative, and learner-centered education that may be difficult to achieve in more structured formal educational environments.

=== Relevance to the needs of disadvantaged groups ===
Nonformal learning is frequently used to address educational needs that formal education systems may not fully meet, particularly for learners in rural or low-income communities or for those who face barriers to participation in formal schooling. Its flexible organization and voluntary participation can increase educational access while allowing programs to respond to the needs of specific learners and communities. Researchers have noted that nonformal education serves two complementary purposes: providing educational opportunities for learners not adequately served by formal education systems and promoting social inclusion by engaging marginalized populations. Programs may serve people with intellectual, physical, or behavioral disabilities as well as other underrepresented populations. Their learner-centered structure allows educational activities to be adapted to participants' developmental levels, interests, and circumstances.

=== Concern with specific categories of person ===
Nonformal learning may complement formal education through enrichment programs, after-school activities, and educational field experiences, or it may provide alternative educational opportunities for individuals who encounter barriers to formal schooling. Programs frequently supplement literacy and numeracy education while also supporting marginalized learners through flexible, inclusive instructional approaches.

Nonformal education is also used as an alternative educational pathway for groups including women and girls, people with disabilities, and individuals who did not complete formal schooling. Although this flexibility allows programs to respond to learners' specific needs, scholars have cautioned that relying exclusively on nonformal education for certain populations may unintentionally reinforce educational segregation or social marginalization. Consequently, many researchers recommend that nonformal education complement rather than replace inclusive formal education whenever possible.

=== Focus on clearly defined purpose ===
Nonformal learning is generally organized around clearly defined educational objectives. Mok describes nonformal learning as "relatively systematic and (but not necessarily) pre-planned," with learners and educators intentionally pursuing specific learning outcomes. Although nonformal learning may include literacy, civic education, and lifelong learning, it frequently emphasizes procedural knowledge, practical skills, and the application of learning in authentic settings. Sadler argued that many physical, intellectual, and social skills require repeated practice, feedback, and supportive learning environments rather than instruction alone.

=== Flexibility in organisation and methods ===
Because nonformal learning occurs outside mandated educational systems, educators have considerable flexibility in selecting instructional methods. Programs commonly incorporate music, dance, art, games, storytelling, discussion, experiential activities, and collaborative projects while adapting content to participants' interests and community priorities. The collaborative and flexible structure of nonformal education is frequently influenced by the needs of participants and their communities. Learners, families, educators, and community members often participate in determining program goals and learning activities, helping ensure that educational experiences remain relevant to local contexts while making effective use of community knowledge and resources.

=== Participatory ===
Participation in nonformal learning is typically voluntary rather than compulsory. Learners generally choose whether to participate and often exercise considerable influence over both learning activities and educational goals. This voluntary nature encourages learner autonomy, intrinsic motivation, and the practical application of new knowledge within participants' personal, professional, and community lives.

== Goals and objectives ==
1. Provides functional literacy and continuing education for adults and youths who have not had a formal education or did not complete their primary education.
2. Provide functional and remedial education for the young people who did not complete their secondary education.
3. Provide education to different categories of graduates to improve the basic knowledge and skills.
4. Provide in-service, on-the-job professional training to different categories of workers and professionals to improve their skills.
5. Give adult citizens of different parts of the country necessary aesthetic, cultural and civic education for public enlightenment.

Countries involved in recognition of non-formal learning (OECD 2010)
Austria	Denmark	Italy	South Africa
Australia	Germany	Korea	Spain
Belgium	Greece	Malta	Slovenia
Canada	Hungary	Mexico	Switzerland
Chile	Iceland	Netherlands	United Kingdom
Czech Republic	Ireland	Norway	Croatia

== Formal and informal learning ==
Although all definitions can be contested (see below) this article shall refer to the European Centre for the Development of Professional Training (Cedefop) 2001 communication on 'lifelong learning: formal, non-formal and informal learning' as the guideline for the differing definitions.

Formal learning: learning typically provided by an education or training institution, structured (in terms of learning objectives, learning time or learning support) and leading to certification. Formal learning is intentional from the learner's perspective.

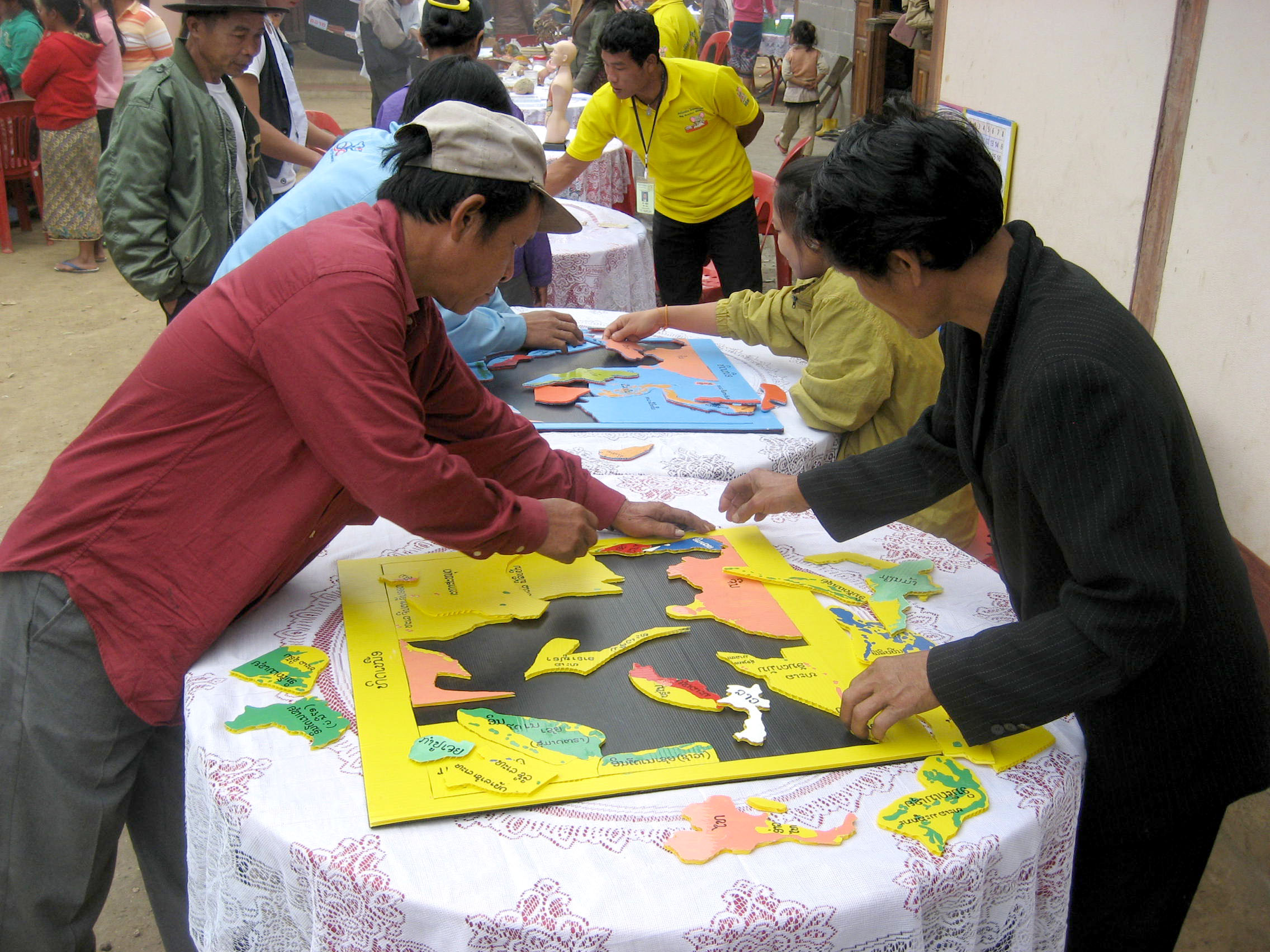
Here, two groups raced to see who could complete the map first. It was the first time any of them had seen a jigsaw puzzle of any sort.

Informal learning: learning resulting from daily life activities related to work, family or leisure. It is not structured (in terms of learning objectives, learning time or learning support) and typically does not lead to certification. Informal learning may be intentional but in most cases it is not-intentional (or "incidental"/random).

UNESCO focuses on the flexibility of non formal education and how it allows for more personalised learning. This type of education is open to any personality, age, origin, and irrespective of their personal interest.

Non-formal learning: see definition above.

== Contested definitions ==
If there is no clear distinction between formal and informal learning where is the room for non-formal learning. It is a contested issue with numerous definitions given. The following are some the competing theories.

"It is difficult to make a clear distinction between formal and informal learning as there is often a crossover between the two."

Similarly, Hodkinson et al. (2003) conclude after a significant literature analysis on the topics of formal, informal, and non-formal learning, that "the terms informal and non-formal appeared interchangeable, each being primarily defined in opposition to the dominant formal education system, and the largely individualist and acquisitional conceptualisations of learning developed in relation to such educational contexts." Moreover, he states that "It is important not to see informal and formal attributes as somehow separate, waiting to be integrated. This is the dominant view in the literature, and it is mistaken. Thus, the challenge is not to, somehow, combine informal and formal learning, for informal and formal attributes are present and inter-related, whether we will it so or not. The challenge is to recognise and identify them, and understand the implications. For this reason, the concept of non-formal learning, at least when seen as a middle state between formal and informal, is redundant."

Eraut's classification of learning into formal and non-formal:

This removes informal learning from the equation and states all learning outside of formal learning is non-formal. Eraut equates informal with connotations of dress, language or behaviour that have no relation to learning. Eraut defines formal learning as taking place within a learning framework; within a classroom or learning institution, with a designated teacher or trainer; the award of a qualification or credit; the external specification of outcomes. Any learning that occurs outside of these parameters is non-formal.

The EC (2001) Communication on Lifelong Learning: formal, non-formal and informal learning:

The EU places non-formal learning in between formal and informal learning (see above). This has learning both in a formal setting with a learning framework and as an organised event but within a qualification. "Non-formal learning: learning that is not provided by an education or training institution and typically does not lead to certification. It is, however, structured (in terms of learning objectives, learning time or learning support). Non-formal learning is intentional from the learner's perspective."

Livingstone's adults formal and informal education, non-formal and informal learning:

This focuses on the idea of adult non-formal education. This new mode, 'informal education' is when teachers or mentors guide learners without reference to structured learning outcomes. This informal education learning is gaining knowledge without an imposed framework, such as learning new job skills.

Billett (2001): there is no such thing as informal learning:

Billett's definition states there is no such thing as non-formal and informal learning. He states all human activity is learning, and that everything people do involves a process of learning. "all learning takes place within social organisations or communities that have formalised structures." Moreover, he states most learning in life takes place outside of formal education.

The Council of Europe puts the distinction in terms of willingness and the systems on which its taking place. Non formal learning takes place outside learning institutions while informal is a part of the formal systems.

== Validation ==
Recently, many international organizations and UNESCO Member States have emphasized the importance of learning that takes place outside of formal learning settings. This emphasis has led UNESCO, through its Institute of Lifelong Learning (UIL), to adopt international guidelines for the Recognition, Validation and Accreditation of the Outcomes of Non-formal and Informal Learning in 2012. The emphasis has also led to an increasing number of policies and programmes in many Member States, and a gradual shift from pilots to large-scale systems such as those in Portugal, France, Australia, Mauritius and South Africa.

Cedefop has created European guidelines to provide validation to a broad range of learning experiences, thereby aiding transparency and comparability across its national borders. The broad framework for achieving this certification across both non-formal and informal learning is outlined in the Cedefop European guidelines for validating non-formal and informal learning; Routes from learning to certification.

European validation frameworks generally describe validation as consisting of four stages: identification, documentation, assessment, and certification. During the identification stage, an individual's knowledge, skills, and competences acquired through non-formal or informal learning are identified. Documentation involves collecting evidence of those learning outcomes. Assessment evaluates the evidence against established standards or criteria, and certification results in formal recognition of the validated learning outcomes, which may include a certificate, academic credit, or another recognized qualification.

Although validation systems vary among countries, European policy has emphasized common principles including transparency, quality assurance, impartiality, clearly defined standards, qualified assessors, and the involvement of relevant stakeholders. While Member States develop validation arrangements that reflect their own education systems and policy priorities, these shared principles are intended to promote greater transparency, trust, and comparability across Europe. These common principles have informed subsequent European guidance on the implementation of validation systems, including Cedefop's European Guidelines for Validating Non-formal and Informal Learning.

These principles are intended to promote transparency, consistency, and credibility in the validation of non-formal and informal learning. Validation makes the knowledge, skills, and competences acquired outside formal education visible to education providers, employers, and other stakeholders, regardless of where the learning originally occurred. As a result, learning acquired through employment, volunteering, family life, or community activities can be formally recognized.

Common principles such as transparency, clearly defined standards, qualified assessors, quality assurance, and stakeholder involvement help ensure that validation processes are transparent, impartial, and credible while allowing Member States to develop validation arrangements appropriate to their own educational and policy contexts. These shared principles have informed subsequent European guidance on the implementation of validation systems, including Cedefop's European Guidelines for Validating Non-formal and Informal Learning.

== Different countries' approaches ==
There are different approaches to validation between OCED and EU countries, with countries adopting different measures. The EU, as noted above, through the Cedefop-released European guidelines for validating non-formal and informal learning in 2009 to standardise validation throughout the EU. Within the OCED countries, the picture is more mixed.

Countries with the existence of recognition for non-formal and informal learning
	Full Program	Partial Program	Limited Program	No program
Austria			x	
Australia	x			
Belgium		x		
Canada	x			
Chile				x
Czech Republic			x	
Denmark	x			
Germany		x		
Greece				x
Hungary			x	
Iceland			x	
Ireland		x		
Italy			x	
Korea			x	
Malta			x	
Mexico		x		
Netherlands		x		
Norway	x			
South Africa		x		
Spain			x	
Slovenia			x	
Switzerland			x	
United Kingdom		x		

=== Play, social development, and non-formal learning ===
Although non-formal learning is often associated with adult education, vocational training, and community organizations, childhood play is increasingly recognized as an important form of non-formal learning. Before entering formal schooling, children develop cognitive, social, emotional, and behavioral competencies through interactions with peers, families, neighborhoods, and community environments. These experiences occur outside prescribed curricula but contribute significantly to lifelong learning and development.

Unlike formal education, which is organized around defined curricula and teacher-directed instruction, play-based learning emerges through children's exploration, imagination, experimentation, and social interaction. During play, children negotiate rules, resolve conflicts, cooperate toward shared goals, develop leadership, and practice creativity in settings such as playgrounds, libraries, neighborhoods, extracurricular activities, and community recreation programs.

Developmental theorists have long viewed play as a meaningful educational process. Jean Piaget argued that play enables children to construct increasingly sophisticated understandings of the world through active exploration and problem solving. Lev Vygotsky emphasized the social nature of learning, arguing that play supports language development, self-regulation, and the internalization of cultural norms through collaborative interaction. John Dewey similarly maintained that meaningful learning occurs through authentic experience, making play and inquiry important educational processes rather than simply recreational activities.

Contemporary research identifies play as a major contributor to executive functioning, including working memory, inhibitory control, cognitive flexibility, planning, and sustained attention. During imaginative and cooperative play, children must remember evolving rules, regulate impulses, adapt to changing circumstances, and coordinate actions with peers. These experiences strengthen cognitive processes associated with later academic achievement.

Play also supports language development by requiring children to negotiate, explain ideas, tell stories, resolve disagreements, and adapt communication to different audiences. Compared with teacher-directed classroom interactions, peer-directed play often requires children to clarify misunderstandings and construct shared meaning independently.

Social and emotional competencies likewise develop through play. Children encounter disappointment, uncertainty, competition, cooperation, and success in relatively low-risk environments, providing opportunities to develop emotional regulation, resilience, empathy, and perspective-taking. Collaborative play also strengthens interpersonal skills such as negotiation, conflict resolution, compromise, and shared decision-making, while open-ended play encourages creativity, divergent thinking, and adaptive problem solving.

Research across developmental psychology, neuroscience, education, and public health consistently links play with school readiness, academic engagement, executive functioning, language acquisition, and social competence. Although children's development is influenced by multiple interacting factors, systematic reviews generally conclude that developmentally appropriate play contributes positively to cognitive, emotional, physical, and social development.

Despite broad agreement regarding its developmental value, scholars continue to debate the role of play within educational systems. Discussions focus on the balance between child-directed play and structured academic instruction, differing definitions of play, and cultural variation in early childhood education. Comparative education research demonstrates that societies differ considerably in the amount of time devoted to play, recess, outdoor learning, and teacher-directed instruction. Researchers also note that access to safe recreational spaces, neighborhood conditions, socioeconomic status, disability, and digital technology influence children's opportunities for non-formal learning.

International organizations increasingly recognize play as an essential component of child development. UNICEF identifies play as a fundamental right under the United Nations Convention on the Rights of the Child, while UNESCO promotes holistic approaches to early childhood education that integrate cognitive, social, emotional, and physical development. These perspectives view play not as an alternative to formal education but as a complementary context for learning within broader lifelong learning systems.

== Flexible schooling or participatory schooling ==
Non-formal education (NFE) is popular on a worldwide scale in both 'western' and 'developing countries'. Non-formal education can form a matrix with formal and non-formal education, as non-formal education can mean any form of systematic learning conducted outside the formal setting. Many courses in relation to non-formal education have been introduced in several universities in western and developing countries.

The UNESCO institute of education conducted a seminar on non-formal education in Morocco. The association for development of education in Africa (ADEA) launched many programmes in non-formal education in at least 15 countries of Sub-Saharan Africa. In 2001 World Bank conducted an international seminar on basic education in non-formal programmes. In addition to this the World Bank was advised to extend its services to adult and non-formal education.

A report on professional education, Making Learning Visible: the identification, assessment and recognition of non-formal learning in Europe, defines non-formal learning as semi structured, consisting of planned and explicit approaches to learning introduced into work organisations and elsewhere, not recognised within the formal education and training system.

Research by Dr Marnee Shay, a senior lecturer in University of Queensland School of Education indicate that there are nearly 10 times more Indigenous students in flexible schools than it would be expected from numbers in the general population.

== Types ==
Several classifications of non-formal education have been proposed. Willems and Andersson classify non-formal education according to two dimensions: (1) "NFE in relation to formal and informal learning (Substitute-Complement)" and (2) "Main learning content of NFE (Competencies-Values)". Based on these two dimensions, they describe four types of non-formal education. The goal of their framework is to better understand the various public governance challenges and structures that very different types of non-formal education have. Similarly, Shrestha and colleagues focus on the role of NFE in comparison to formal education. Hoppers proposes a three-fold classification, also in comparison to formal education: "A. Supplementary provisions", "B. Compensatory provisions", and "C. Alternative provisions". Rogers pinpoints to the changing role of NFE over the last five decades and makes a distinction between a first and a second generation NFE.

Non-formal learning takes shape in many different ways across countries, organizations, and contexts. These differences are reflected in how educational needs are identified, how learning is designed and delivered, and who participates in decision-making. Stakeholders may include communities, national and local governments, educational institutions, community organizations, public agencies, employers, and learners themselves.

=== Community-based learning and development ===
Community-based learning is a form of non-formal education in which communities help determine their own learning priorities. Program goals vary according to local needs and may support individual development, community capacity-building, lifelong learning, social inclusion, democratic participation, or active citizenship. For example, a community identifying a need for financial literacy may organize workshops on tax planning, budgeting, debt management, or financial well-being through partnerships with nonprofit organizations, government agencies, educational institutions, or private organizations.

Community-based learning activities may be designed by community educators, universities, government agencies, nonprofit organizations, religious organizations, charitable foundations, consulting firms, or private-sector organizations. The organizations responsible for program design are not always those that deliver instruction. Learning may instead be facilitated by local professionals, volunteers, subject-matter experts, public agencies, community educators, or educational institutions.

Governance of community-based learning varies according to local context and program objectives. Community members, advisory boards, public agencies, nonprofit organizations, and local governments may participate in identifying learning priorities, supporting implementation, and evaluating outcomes.

Community-based learning ranges from informal local initiatives to well-established national systems. Scotland's Community Learning and Development (CLD) framework is an example of an institutionalized model of community-based non-formal learning.

The purpose of Scotland's CLD framework is to promote community development, social inclusion, active citizenship, and lifelong learning. The Scottish Government supports Community Learning and Development through local authorities and partner organizations, while communities collaborate with practitioners and public agencies to identify learning priorities. Learning activities include adult education, youth work, family learning, and community development initiatives. Governance is partnership-based, involving local authorities, community organizations, practitioners, and community members. Learning is commonly delivered through youth organizations, schools, libraries, community centres, and voluntary associations, allowing programs to remain responsive to local needs while strengthening community participation and social cohesion.

Scotland's Community Learning and Development model demonstrates how non-formal learning can be integrated into community life through collaborative governance and locally responsive programming. Such approaches support knowledge sharing, civic participation, collaboration, and community development while adapting to changing social and economic conditions.

Community work, which is particularly widespread in Scotland, fosters people's commitment to their neighbours and encourages participation in and development of local democratic forms of organisation.

Youth work which focuses on making people more active in the society.

Social work which helps young people in homes to develop ways to deal with complex situations like fostering fruitful relationships between parents and children, bringing different groups of career together, etc...

In France and Italy animation in a particular form is a kind of non-formal education. It uses theatre and acting as means of self-expression with different community groups for children and people with special needs. This type of non-formal education helps in ensuring active participation and teaches people to manage the community in which they live.

Youth and community organisations young people have the opportunity to discover, analyse and understand values and their implications and build a set of values to guide their lives. They run work camps and meetings, recruit volunteers, administer bank accounts, give counselling etc. to work toward social change.

== Agricultural extension and outreach ==
Agricultural extension is a widely recognized form of nonformal learning that provides research-based educational programs through partnerships among universities, governments, and local communities. Extension systems connect universities, research institutions, government agencies, nonprofit organizations, and local communities to provide voluntary educational programs that address locally identified needs. Rather than awarding academic credentials, Extension education emphasizes practical learning, knowledge exchange, and the application of research to real-world challenges in areas such as agriculture, natural resource management, youth development, family well-being, and community development.

Although extension systems differ across countries, they share the common goal of making research-based knowledge accessible through flexible, community-centered educational programs. As a result, agricultural extension has become a widely recognized example of how nonformal learning supports lifelong learning, community engagement, and sustainable development across diverse cultural and geographic contexts.

=== Historical development ===
Agricultural extension emerged during the nineteenth century as universities, governments, and agricultural organizations sought to expand educational opportunities beyond formal classrooms. Rapid industrialization, advances in agricultural science, and growing demands for increased food production highlighted the need to make research-based knowledge more accessible to farmers and rural communities. Early outreach initiatives emphasized practical instruction through demonstrations, public lectures, farm visits, and community meetings, establishing a model of voluntary, experience-based learning that reflected the principles of nonformal education.

One of the earliest organized extension models emerged through university extension programs in Europe during the late nineteenth century. Universities expanded their public mission by offering lectures, correspondence courses, and outreach activities designed to share scientific knowledge with broader audiences. These efforts influenced similar outreach initiatives in North America and other regions, where educational institutions increasingly viewed community engagement as an important part of their mission.

During the twentieth century, Extension expanded globally as governments and international organizations recognized education as an important driver of agricultural development, food security, and rural livelihoods. Following World War II, organizations such as the Food and Agriculture Organization of the United Nations (FAO) and UNESCO supported extension and advisory services that promoted improved farming practices, nutrition, natural resource management, and community leadership, particularly in regions with limited access to formal education.

As extension systems matured, educational approaches shifted from one-way technology transfer toward more participatory models that recognized farmers and community members as active contributors to the learning process. Contemporary extension increasingly emphasizes collaboration, local knowledge, and shared problem solving alongside scientific research. This evolution reflects broader developments in comparative and international education, which recognize that effective educational practices should be responsive to the cultural, social, and environmental contexts in which learning occurs.

Today, Extension programs are recognized as one of the world's largest systems of nonformal education. These historical developments established the foundation for modern Extension systems, which continue to connect research institutions with communities through practical, learner-centered educational programs that support agricultural innovation, environmental stewardship, and community development.

=== Agricultural extension ===
Extension programs deliver research-based educational programs that help individuals and communities apply scientific knowledge to practical challenges. While organizational structures differ across countries, Extension systems share the common goal of responding to locally identified needs through voluntary educational opportunities rather than formal academic instruction. Programs commonly address agricultural production, natural resource management, environmental stewardship, youth development, family and consumer sciences, community development, leadership, and community resilience, demonstrating the broad role of Extension as a global system of nonformal education.

A well-known extension model developed in the United States through the land-grant university system. Established by the Smith-Lever Act of 1914, the Cooperative Extension System created partnerships among federal, state, and local governments and land-grant universities to deliver research-based educational programs. Initially focused on improving agricultural production and rural livelihoods, the system later expanded to include natural resource management, family and consumer sciences, youth development through 4-H, community development, nutrition, financial management, and leadership education. While the U.S. Cooperative Extension System remains one of the most recognized extension models, similar systems have been established and adapted worldwide to address local educational, agricultural, and community development priorities.

Region	Example Organization/System	Primary Educational Focus	Common Educational Approaches
United States	Cooperative Extension System (Land-Grant Universities)	Agriculture, 4-H youth development, family and consumer sciences, natural resources, community development	Demonstrations, workshops, field days, consultations, volunteer education, applied research
Canada	Provincial Extension Services, universities, producer organizations	Agriculture, environmental stewardship, rural development, business management	Workshops, farm visits, producer networks, online education, demonstrations
Europe	Agricultural advisory services, university outreach, farmer advisory networks	Agricultural innovation, sustainability, lifelong learning, environmental management	Advisory services, producer groups, collaborative research, continuing education
India	Krishi Vigyan Kendras (Farm Science Centers), Indian Council of Agricultural Research (ICAR)	Farmer education, technology transfer, nutrition, rural livelihoods, women's empowerment	On-farm demonstrations, vocational training, field schools, farmer workshops
Africa	National agricultural advisory services, Farmer Field Schools, universities, NGOs	Food security, climate resilience, sustainable agriculture, rural livelihoods	Participatory learning, demonstration farms, peer learning, community projects
Australia	State Extension programs, research organizations, producer groups	Agricultural innovation, water management, climate adaptation, biosecurity	Workshops, producer groups, demonstration farms, online learning
New Zealand	Industry organizations, advisory services, research institutes	Sustainable agriculture, environmental stewardship, farm business management	Discussion groups, mentoring, on-farm trials, producer networks
Pacific Islands	Government Extension services, universities, NGOs	Food security, climate adaptation, fisheries, Indigenous resource management	Community meetings, demonstrations, local knowledge exchange, participatory education
Latin America	Rural Extension services, cooperatives, universities, NGOs	Rural development, agroecology, food sovereignty, community development	Farmer-to-farmer learning, participatory research, demonstrations, community workshops

Despite differences in governance and funding, Extension systems share the defining characteristics of nonformal education. Participation is voluntary, learning is organized around practical challenges identified by participants, and educational activities encourage the application of knowledge rather than the completion of academic coursework. Extension educators serve as facilitators who connect research with local experience, helping individuals evaluate information, develop practical skills, and identify solutions that are appropriate for their communities. These characteristics closely reflect Rogers' description of nonformal education as flexible, participatory, and responsive to community needs.

Educational methods commonly used in Extension include demonstrations, workshops, field days, producer meetings, farm visits, mentoring, youth programs, and one-on-one consultations. These approaches emphasize experiential learning by encouraging participants to observe new practices, evaluate research findings, share experiences with peers, and apply knowledge within their own operations or communities. Increasingly, Extension systems recognize that effective learning is reciprocal, integrating scientific research with the practical knowledge of farmers, community members, and Indigenous peoples. This participatory approach reflects broader developments in comparative and international education that recognize multiple ways of knowing and the importance of local context.

Contemporary extension programs address a broad range of issues beyond agricultural production, including food security, climate adaptation, environmental sustainability, entrepreneurship, financial literacy, public health, water management, disaster preparedness, and community leadership. The Food and Agriculture Organization of the United Nations identifies Extension and advisory services as important mechanisms for strengthening rural livelihoods, promoting innovation, and supporting sustainable development. As Extension systems continue to evolve, they remain one of the world's largest and most established systems of nonformal education, connecting research, community engagement, and lifelong learning through practical educational opportunities.

=== Global extension systems ===
Extension systems operate across every inhabited continent and have developed in response to regional educational, agricultural, and community needs. Although governance structures, funding models, and educational priorities vary among countries, Extension programs share a common purpose of connecting research, education, and communities through nonformal learning. Rather than applying a single educational model worldwide, Extension systems have evolved to reflect the cultural, political, economic, and environmental contexts of individual countries while maintaining a commitment to voluntary, learner-centered education.

Extension systems in North America are closely associated with universities and public institutions, while many European countries integrate Extension with agricultural advisory services and lifelong learning initiatives. Across Asia, large national networks such as India's Krishi Vigyan Kendras emphasize farmer education, technology transfer, and rural development. In Africa, Extension programs frequently focus on food security, climate resilience, and participatory approaches such as Farmer Field Schools. Throughout Oceania, Extension organizations increasingly combine scientific research with Indigenous ecological knowledge to address sustainable resource management and climate adaptation. In Latin America, Extension has evolved toward participatory rural development, agroecology, and farmer-to-farmer learning that encourages collaboration between researchers and local communities.

== Characteristics ==
Nonformal learning is an organized educational activity that occurs outside formal education systems while maintaining intentional learning objectives. It is often described as occupying a middle ground between formal and informal learning. Informal learning occurs naturally through family, culture, and everyday experience, while formal learning typically takes place within educational institutions, follows prescribed curricula, and includes structured assessment. Nonformal learning shares characteristics with both forms of education, combining intentional instruction with flexibility in organization and delivery." />

=== Learning may take place in a variety of locations ===
One characteristic of nonformal learning is its flexibility in where and how learning occurs. Learners often have significant autonomy in determining the objectives, timing, and methods of their learning, while educators may adapt instructional approaches to participants' interests and local needs. Learning activities may include field trips, demonstrations, hands-on experiences, lectures, mentoring, or interactions with professionals and subject-matter experts. Programs may be offered in physical or virtual settings, including sports associations, adult literacy programs, after-school clubs, community organizations, workplaces, museums, libraries, and community-based projects. These settings provide opportunities for experiential, collaborative, and learner-centered education that may be difficult to achieve in more structured formal educational environments." />

=== Relevance to the needs of disadvantaged groups ===
Nonformal learning is frequently used to address educational needs that formal education systems may not fully meet, particularly for learners in rural or low-income communities or for those who face barriers to participation in formal schooling. Its flexible organization and voluntary participation can increase educational access while allowing programs to respond to the needs of specific learners and communities." />

Researchers have noted that nonformal education serves two complementary purposes: providing educational opportunities for learners not adequately served by formal education systems and promoting social inclusion by engaging marginalized populations. Programs may serve people with disabilities, women and girls, individuals who did not complete formal schooling, and other underrepresented populations. Their learner-centered structure allows educational activities to be adapted to participants' developmental levels, interests, and circumstances.

=== Concern with specific categories of person ===
Nonformal learning may complement formal education through enrichment programs, after-school activities, and educational field experiences, or it may provide alternative educational opportunities for individuals who encounter barriers to formal schooling. Programs frequently supplement literacy and numeracy education while also supporting marginalized learners through flexible, inclusive instructional approaches.

Scholars have also cautioned that relying exclusively on nonformal education for specific populations may unintentionally reinforce educational segregation or social marginalization. Consequently, many researchers recommend that nonformal education complement rather than replace inclusive formal education whenever possible.

=== Focus on clearly defined purpose ===
Nonformal learning is generally organized around clearly defined educational objectives. Mok describes nonformal learning as "relatively systematic and (but not necessarily) pre-planned," with learners and educators intentionally pursuing specific learning outcomes. Although nonformal learning may include literacy, civic education, and lifelong learning, it frequently emphasizes procedural knowledge, practical skills, and the application of learning in authentic settings." /> As Sadler argues, many physical, intellectual, and social skills require repeated practice, feedback, and supportive learning environments rather than instruction alone.

=== Flexibility in organisation and methods ===
Because nonformal learning occurs outside mandated educational systems, educators have considerable flexibility in selecting instructional methods. Programs commonly incorporate music, art, storytelling, games, discussion, experiential activities, and collaborative projects while adapting content to participants' interests and community priorities.

Learners, families, educators, and community members frequently participate in determining program goals and learning activities, helping ensure that educational experiences remain relevant to local contexts and make effective use of community knowledge and resources.

=== Participatory ===
Participation in nonformal learning is typically voluntary rather than compulsory. Learners generally choose whether to participate and often exercise considerable influence over both learning activities and educational goals. This voluntary nature encourages learner autonomy, intrinsic motivation, and the practical application of new knowledge within participants' personal, professional, and community lives.

== Importance ==
Education plays an important role in development. Out of school programmes are important to provide adaptable learning opportunities and new skills and knowledge to a large percentage of people who are beyond the reach of formal education. Non-formal education began to gain popularity in the late 1960s and early 1970s. Today, non-formal education is seen as a concept of recurrent and lifelong learning.

Non-formal education is popular among the adults specially the women as it increases women's participation in both private and public activities, i.e. in house hold decision making and as active citizens in the community affairs and national development. These literacy programmes have a dramatic impact on women's self-esteem because they unleash their potential in economic, social, cultural and political spheres.

According to UNESCO (2010), non-formal education helps to ensures equal access to education, eradicate illiteracy among women and improve women's access to professional training, science, technology and continuing education. It also encourages the development of non-discriminatory education and training. The effectiveness of such literacy and non-formal education programmes are bolstered by family, community and parental involvement. This is why the United Nations Sustainable Development Goal 4 advocates for a diversification of learning opportunities and the usage of a wide range of education and training modalities in recognition of the importance of non-formal education.

== Advantages ==
Non-formal education is beneficial in a number of ways. There are activities that encourage young people to choose their own programme and projects that are important because they offer the youth the flexibility and freedom to explore their emerging interests. When the youth can choose the activities in which they can participate, they have opportunities to develop several skills like decision making skills. A distinction can be made between "participant functionality" and "societal functionality" of non-formal education. Participant functionality refers to the aimed advantages for the individual participants in non-formal education, while societal functionality refers to the benefits non-formal education has on society in general.

Non-formal learning has experiential learning activities that foster the development of skills and knowledge. This helps in building the confidence and abilities among the youth of today. It also helps in development of personal relationships not only among the youth but also among the adults. It helps in developing interpersonal skills among the young people as they learn to interact with peers outside the class and with adults in the community.

== Necessity ==
Formal education system are inadequate to effectively meet the needs of the individual and the society. The need to offer more and better education at all levels, to a growing number of people, particularly in developing countries, the scant success of current formal education systems to meet all such demands, has shown the need to develop alternatives to learning.

The rigid structure of formal schools, mainly because of rules and regulations than concentrating on the real need of the students, offering curriculum that leans away from the individual and from society, far more concerned with performing programmes than reaching useful objectives. This called for non-formal education which starting from the basic need of the students, is concerned with the establishment of strategies that are compatible with reality.

== Disadvantages ==
The recognition of non-formal learning through credentials, diplomas, certificates, and awards is sorely lacking, which can negatively affect employment opportunities which require specific certification or degrees.

Non-formal learning, due to its 'unofficial' and ad-hoc nature, may also not have a specific curriculum with a clear structure and direction which also implies a lack of accountability due to an over-reliance on self-assessment. Moreover, more often than not, the organizations or individuals providing non-formal learning tend to be teachers who were not professionally trained, thus meaning they possess less qualities than professionally trained teachers, which will negatively affect the students.

== Sources ==
- This article incorporates text from a free content work. Licensed under CC-BY-SA IGO 3.0 (license statement/permission). Text taken from Level-setting and recognition of learning outcomes: The use of level descriptors in the twenty-first century, 114, Keevey, James; Chakroun, Borhene, UNESCO. UNESCO.
