= Jerry Simon =

American-Israeli basketball player

Jerry Simon ג'רי סיימון
Personal information
- Born: March 23, 1968 (age 58) Los Angeles, California, U.S.
- Listed height: 6 ft 5 in (1.96 m)

Career information
- High school: John Marshall (Los Angeles, California)
- College: Penn (1986–1990)
- NBA draft: 1990: undrafted
- Position: Guard

Jerry Simon (Hebrew: ג'רי סיימון; born March 23, 1968) is an American-Israeli former college and professional basketball player. He played professional basketball in Israel for Hapoel Galil Elyon, Elitzur Kiryat Ata, and Hapoel Haifa in the Israeli Basketball Premier League, and for the Israel men's national basketball team.

In one high school game in 1986 he scored 69 points, establishing a new single-game scoring record for a high school player in Los Angeles. He was a member of the Team USA silver medal winning 1989 Maccabiah Games basketball team. He is 6 feet 5 inches (1.96 m) tall.

== Biography ==
Simon was born and raised in Los Angeles, California. He now lives in Newport Beach, California, with his wife and four children (Barak, Maya, Nadav, and Jacob). He has since divorced and separated from his wife.

He attended and played basketball at John Marshall High School, with the team winning the Los Angeles High School Basketball Championship and him leading the State of California in scoring. In one game in 1986 Simon scored 69 points, establishing a new single-game scoring record for a high school player in Los Angeles, as his team beat Belmont High School by a score of 98-61. For the season he averaged 37.8 points, 18.0 rebounds, and 12.2 assists per game. In 1986 he was High School California All-State and Section 3-A Los Angeles City Player of the Year. He was named to the 1985-86 Jewish All-American High School Basketball Team and its Player of the Year.

Simon attended the University of Pennsylvania (1990) and played for four years for, and was captain in 1989-90 of, the University of Pennsylvania Quakers men's basketball team. In a game against Brown University in February 1990 he made seven three-point field goals, at the time a Penn record, and that season he led the team with 53 three-pointers (2.04 per game), an 82.3 free throw percentage, and 46 steals (leading the Ivy League; 1.77 per game-also leading the league). In 1989 he was All-Ivy League honorable mention, and in 1990 he was All-Ivy League and All-Philadelphia Big 5.

He was a member of the Team USA silver medal winning 1989 Maccabiah Games basketball team.

From 1990 to 2001, Simon played professional basketball in Israel for Hapoel Galil Elyon, Elitzur Kiryat Ata, and Hapoel Haifa in the Israeli Basketball Premier League. He was a guard. In 1993, his Hapoel Galil Elyon team won the Israeli Basketball Premier League championship, a title previously held by Maccabi Tel Aviv for 30 consecutive years. In 1993 he received Israel’s Sixth Man Award. That same season, he played on the Israeli National Basketball Team in the World University Games. In 1995 he was Northern Israel Player of the Year.

Simon made aliyah, and served in the Israel Defense Forces.

He teaches and has coached basketball at Marina High School in Huntington Beach, California, and coaches basketball at 6 Points Sports Academy.

== Honors ==
Simon was inducted into the Southern California Jewish Sports Hall of Fame in 2004, and into the Orange County Jewish Sports Hall of Fame in 2014.
