= Yesika Salgado =

American poet (born 1984)

- Born: 1984 (age 41–42)
- Occupation: Poet
- Website: www.yesikasalgado.com

Yesika Salgado (born 1984) is an American poet. She is the author of poetry collections Corazón, Tesoro, and Hermosa. She is also a co-founder of the poetry collective Chingona Fire.

== Early life ==
Salgado's parents immigrated from El Salvador and she grew up in Los Angeles. Her father encouraged her reading habits, but wanted her to become a teacher. Salgado dropped out of John Marshall High School when she was 18 years old, and worked a series of retail jobs while writing her poetry.

== Career ==
In 2005, Salgado started posting her work online at HipHopPoetry.com, where she had created a false identity under the name Yesika Starr. After she was banned three years later for plagiarizing a Ricardo Arjona song, the site's founder encouraged her to read at the open mic night at Da Poetry Lounge, where she began performing under her own name. In 2014, Salgado performed at the National Poetry Slam for the DPL. She later qualified for the 2016 Da Poetry Lounge Slam Team. During this time Salgado frequently shared her work on Instagram, building a large social media following.

Salgado's first book, Corazón, was published in 2017. Salgado frequently mentions fruit throughout the book, specifically mangoes, and the cover of the book reflects this theme. Corazón was listed on Amazon's best seller list. Her second book, Tesoro, was published in 2018. Its poems draw on Salgado's family history to examine women, Los Angeles, and identity. Her most recent book, Hermosa, was published in September 2019 and deals with love, loss, and gentrification.

Salgado and Angela Aguirre founded the feminist poetry collective Chingona Fire. The organization hosts frequent open mic/performance nights for women-identified poets of color to share their work.

== Bibliography ==
=== Poetry ===
- Hermosa, Not A Cult Press, 2019
- Tesoro, Not A Cult Press, 2018
- Corazón, Not A Cult Press, 2017
- Sentimental Boss Bitch, self-published, 2017
- WOES, self-published, 2016
- The Luna Poems, self-published, 2013
