= Peter Freebody =

Australian academic (1950–2026)

- Born: 12 August 1950; Sydney, New South Wales, Australia
- Died: 30 August 2026 (aged 76); Berry, New South Wales, Australia
- Education: University of Sydney (B.A.); Sydney Teachers' College (DipEd); University of Illinois at Urbana–Champaign (PhD)
- Scientific career
- Fields: Literacy education, classroom interaction and quantitative and qualitative research methods
- Workplaces: Normanhurst Boys High School; Center for Behavioral Studies in Education, New South Wales; University of Illinois; Center for Advanced Study in the Behavioral Sciences; University of New England (Australia); Griffith University; Nanyang Technological University; University of Queensland; University of Sydney; University of Wollongong
- Doctoral students: Stephen Billett

Peter Freebody (12 August 1950 – 30 August 2026) was an Australian literacy educator and researcher.

His appointments included Honorary Professorial Fellow at the University of Wollongong, Australia, Professorial Research Fellow with the Faculty of Education and Social Work and a core member of the CoCo Research Centre at the University of Sydney in Sydney, Australia.. He served on numerous Australian State and Commonwealth literacy education and assessment advisory groups. Freebody, with Allan Luke, originated the Four Resources Model of literacy education.

== Life and career ==
Freebody was born in Sydney, Australia on 12 August 1950. He received his Bachelor of Arts (Honours 1st Class) in Education from the University of Sydney in Sydney, Australia in 1973. Freebody received his Diploma in Education from the Sydney Teacher's College in 1973 and his Teaching Certificate from the New South Wales Department of Education in 1974. In 1980 Freebody received his PhD from the School of Education, University of Illinois at Urbana–Champaign, Illinois, U.S.A.

After receiving his Diploma in Education in 1973, he taught for a year at Normanhurst Boys High School in New South Wales, Australia before taking a position as lecturer at the Center for Behavioral Studies in Education, University of New England, New South Wales from 1975 to 1977. He served as a research assistant at the Center for the Study of Reading at the University of Illinois from 1977 to 1979 and as a Visiting Research Associate at the Center for Advanced Study in the Behavioral Sciences in Stanford, California from 1979 to 1980.

Returning to Australia in 1981, Freebody took a position as Lecturer, and in 1985 he became a Senior Lecturer with the Department of Behavioral Studies in Education, University of New England, Armidale, New South Wales. From 1992 to 2002 he was a professor with the Faculty of Education at Griffith University in Brisbane, Queensland. In 2003 he moved to Singapore as Professor and Deputy Dean (Research) at the Centre for Research in Pedagogy and Practice, National Institute of Education (part of Nanyang Technological University). Returning to Australia in 2005, Freebody took a position as Professor in the School of Education at the University of Queensland in St. Lucia. In 2007 he accepted a Professorial Research Fellowship at the University of Sydney.

Freebody died in Berry, New South Wales on 30 August 2026, at the age of 76.

== Journals and other bodies ==
Freebody's work has appeared in journals such as Reading Research Quarterly, Harvard Educational Review, and the American Educational Research Journal. He has also contributed numerous invited entries in international handbooks and encyclopedias on literacy, critical literacy, and research methodology.

Freebody has served on numerous Australian state and national advisory groups in the area of literacy education, and was senior consultant on the national on-line curriculum initiative conducted by the Curriculum Corporation.

Freebody was 2015-2016 Chair of the International Literacy Association's Research Panel, and 2014 recipient of that Association's WS Gray award for contributions to literacy education internationally.

== Four Resources Model ==
In the early 1990s, Allan Luke and Peter Freebody of Griffith University introduced the Four Resources Model in literacy education. This model seeks to reconcile the debates among Whole Language, Phonics, critical literacy and others. This model postulates that in order to be a fully literate citizen, a person needs:

1. coding competence (the ability to decode text, i.e. phonics)
2. semantic competence (the ability to make meaning, i.e. comprehension)
3. pragmatic competence (every day, functional literacy, i.e. writing a check, reading the newspaper, filling out a job application, etc.)
4. critical competence (the ability to critically select and analyze texts, i.e. avoiding scams, determining reliable sources of information, etc.)

Luke and Freebody assert that no one of these resources is sufficient by itself but that each is essential. Further, the resources are not meant to indicate a sequence of instruction. Different resources should be present in instruction in varying amounts, depending upon the needs of the students. Luke has also stated that critical competence, far from being an upper level topic, can begin to be developed in year one of education and before.
