= Chingona Fire =

US Latina feminist poetry collective

Chingona Fire is a Latina feminist poetry collective from Los Angeles, California. It was founded by the poets Angela Aguirre and Yesika Salgado in February 2016. Their goal is to create a safe space and visibility for women of color. They are helping women of color to have locations to perform on stage and to have their voices heard. Each month they host events where people can perform in front of audiences of approximately 80–100 listeners.

"Patriarchy will have you believe that, and internalize that, so we are trying to change that narrative to one that celebrates with other women instead of competes with them," she (Aguirre) said. "We need to stop feeling pain and jealously from someone’s success and instead see it as them breaking a barrier that's helping you get closer and closer to that door."

== Founders ==
Angela Aguirre, 28 and half-Mexicana, has been a poet for seven years. Aguirre has a background in education in rhetoric and social change from The University of California Los Angeles. She has featured as a speaker in large events such as Adelante Mujer Latina Conference and the Women of Racial Justice Breakfast. Aguirre released Confessions of a Firework, a book of her poetry and writing prompts, through World Stage Press in 2016.

Yesika Salgado, who describes herself as "Fat, Fly, and Brown," is 32 and Salvadoran. Yesika is an eight-year veteran of Da Poetry Lounge (DPL), the mecca of Los Angeles slam poetry and spoken word and a member of the 2014 and 2016 Da Poetry Lounge Slam Team and placed top 10 in the nation both years. She has also been a Huffington Post contributor. Salgado published her first collection of poems, The Luna Poems in 2013. Her second publication entitled WOES was released in 2016. Her most recent work, Sentimental Boss Bitch saw a limited release of 100 copies in February 2017.
