= Robin Graham (horn player) =

- Instrument: French horn

Robin Graham (born April 10, 1955) is an American-born French horn player.

== Early life and career ==
Both her parents were amateur musicians; her mother, a public school music teacher, played flute, and her father, an architect, played oboe. Her principal teachers during her youth were horn players Wendell Hoss and Sinclair Lott. At Juilliard her teacher was James Chambers, former Principal Horn of the New York Philharmonic.

She began her professional career when, as a 20-year-old senior at the Juilliard School, she won the Principal Horn position with the Houston Symphony Orchestra, becoming the youngest player in that orchestra’s history and the first woman to win a Principal Horn position in a major American orchestra by formal, screened audition. She joined the orchestra almost immediately near the end of the 1975–1976 season.

Her first full season with Houston (1976–1977) was marred by a lengthy strike, after which she decided to return to New York to resume her freelance career. She joined the Dorian Wind Quintet, with whom she toured the U.S. and Europe, and she often played substitute and extra horn with the New York Philharmonic (including on its 1978 tour of South America). She also performed frequently with the Chamber Music Society of Lincoln Center, joining the group on its first international tour, a fourteen-day, eleven-concert tour of Australia in 1984.

In 1979, she moved to Los Angeles, where she joined the Los Angeles Chamber Orchestra as Principal Horn and worked as a studio player, performing on the scores of dozens of movies and television shows. During the 1982 – 83 season, she took a leave of absence from LACO to serve as Acting Principal Horn of the Cincinnati Symphony Orchestra. Two years later, she returned to Cincinnati as the orchestra’s permanent Principal Horn, where she remained until injury caused her to retire early in 2003.

In the 1980s, as a member of the Ligeti Trio with violinist Saschko Gawriloff and pianists Eckart Besch and Volker Banfield, Graham performed György Ligeti’s Trio for Violin, Horn and Piano more than thirty times throughout Europe, including the British, French, Dutch, Polish and Scandinavian premieres. She performed the American premiere in 1984 at the Chamber Music Northwest Music Festival with violinist Ida Kavafian and pianist David Oei.

Her festival performances included the Aspen Music Festival, Marlboro Music Festival, Chamber Music Northwest, Sarasota Music Festival, Ojai Festival, June Music Festival, Aldeburgh Festival, Warsaw Autumn Festival and Music Academy of the West, among others.

Graham has served on the music faculties of Brooklyn College, Rice University, UCLA and California Institute of the Arts. She made more than a dozen recordings with the Los Angeles Chamber Orchestra on the Delos, Nonesuch and Angel/EMI labels and more than seventy recordings with the Cincinnati Symphony Orchestra, all on the Telarc label.

== Selected recordings ==
- Bach – Brandenburg Concertos (Complete) Gerard Schwarz - Los Angeles Chamber Orchestra (Angel Records)
- Barber – Summer Music for Woodwind Quintet, Op. 31 (Marlboro Recording Society)
- Beethoven and Mozart - Piano and Wind Quintets - Carol Rosenberger and Los Angeles Chamber Orchestra Winds (Delos)
- Bruckner - Symphony No. 4 «Romantic» (Original 1874 Version) - Jesús López-Cobos, Cincinnati Symphony Orchestra (Telarc)
- Dvořák - Serenade, Op. 44 - Los Angeles Chamber Orchestra, Gerard Schwarz (Nonesuch)
- Handel – Water Music (Complete) - Gerard Schwarz/ Los Angeles Chamber Orchestra (Delos)
- Janáček – Mládí ("Youth") For Wind Sextet - Los Angeles Chamber Orchestra Winds (Nonesuch)
- Gustav Mahler - Songs Of A Wayfarer, Kindertotenlieder, Vier Lieder Nach Gedichte Von Rückert - Jesús López-Cobos, Cincinnati Symphony Orchestra, Andreas Schmidt (2) (Telarc)
- Mahler - Symphony No. 3 - Cincinnati Symphony Orchestra, Jesús López-Cobos, Michelle DeYoung, Women Of The May Festival Chorus, Robert Porco, Cincinnati College Conservatory Of Music Children´s Choir, Ann Marie Koukios (Telarc)
- Mahler - Symphony No. 9 - Cincinnati Symphony Orchestra, Jesús López-Cobos (Telarc)
- Mozart – Wind Serenades in E-Flat, K. 375, and C Minor, K. 388 – Los Angeles Chamber Orchestra Winds (Nonesuch)
- Mozart - Quintet for Horn and Strings, K. 407 (Nuova Era/Fone)
- Arnold Schoenberg, – Chamber Symphony No 1. Op. 9 - Los Angeles Chamber Orchestra, Gerard Schwarz (Nonesuch)
- Richard Strauss – Rosenkavalier Suite / Salome’s Dance / Burleske / Festival Prelude - Jesús López-Cobos, Cincinnati Symphony Orchestra (Telarc)
