= Allan Luke =

Australian academic

Allan Luke AO (born 1950) is an educator, researcher, and theorist studying literacy, multiliteracies, applied linguistics, and educational sociology and policy. Luke has written or edited 17 books and more than 250 articles and book chapters. Luke, with Peter Freebody, originated the Four Resources Model of literacy in the 1990s. Part of the New London Group, he was coauthor of the "Pedagogy of Multiliteracies: Designing Social Futures" published in the Harvard Educational Review (1996). He is Emeritus Professor at Queensland University of Technology in Brisbane, Australia and adjunct professor at Werklund School of Education, University of Calgary, Canada.

== Education ==
Luke received his Bachelor of Arts from the University of California, Santa Barbara in 1972. Luke received his teaching certificate in 1976 and his M.A. in 1980, from Simon Fraser University in Burnaby, British Columbia. He taught primary and secondary school in British Columbia and lectured at Simon Fraser and British Columbia Institute of Technology before taking a position at James Cook University, Australia in 1984. He received his Ph. D. from Simon Fraser University in 1985.

== Career ==
Luke taught at James Cook University until 1995. From 1996 to 2003, he was Dean of Education at the University of Queensland, and Deputy Director General for Education for Queensland from 1999 to 2000. Until 2003, Luke was the Chief Educational Advisor to the Queensland Minister of Education. From 2003 to 2005, Luke was the Foundation Dean of the Centre for Research in Pedagogy and Practice at the National Institute of Education at Nanyang Technological University, in Singapore. In 2006, Luke has returned to a position as research professor at Queensland University of Technology in Brisbane, Australia.

== Four Resources Model ==
In the early 1990s, Luke and Peter Freebody introduced the Four Resources Model in literacy education. This model seeks to reconcile the debates between whole language, phonics, critical literacy and others. This model postulates that in order to be a fully literate citizen, a person needs:

1. coding competence (the ability to decode text, i.e. phonics)
2. semantic competence (the ability to make meaning, i.e. comprehension)
3. pragmatic competence (every day, functional literacy, i.e. writing a check, reading the newspaper, filling out a job application, etc.)
4. critical competence (the ability to critically select and analyze texts, i.e. avoiding scams, determining reliable sources of information, etc.)

Luke and Freebody assert that no one of these resources is sufficient by itself but that each is essential. Further, the resources are not meant to indicate a sequence of instruction. Different resources should be present in instruction in varying amounts, depending upon the needs of the students. Luke has also stated that critical competence, far from being an advanced area of study, can begin to be developed in year one of education and before.

== Personal history ==
Allan Luke is a third-generation Chinese-American by birth. He is an Australian and Canadian dual citizen. He grew up in Los Angeles and attended school in Echo Park and Silverlake. In 1973, he moved to Canada to attend Simon Fraser University. His partner Carmen Luke published major work on feminism, sociology and media literacy. Luke worked as a substitute teacher in the schools of the Fraser Valley. He studied primary education with Kieran Egan. In 1975, Jonathan Kozol, who had just published The Night is Dark and I am Far From Home, came to SFU as a guest lecturer. He introduced Luke to the works of Paulo Freire, including Pedagogy of the Oppressed. Luke describes this as a life-changing event.

Luke initially had difficulty finding a job as a primary teacher, which he believes was due to prejudice against Asian people still prevalent in Canada at the time. In Armstrong, British Columbia, he was hired at a rural secondary school teaching English, drama, and Spanish. When the first wave of Vietnamese immigrants arrived in Canada in 1976, he was asked to teach ESL, although he had no training or background in ESL at the time.

Luke worked toward his Ph.D. in Sociology of Literacy, an emergent area of research. At the time, literacy was thought to be a cognitive and psycholinguistic process that had little to do with social factors, including class, race, and identity. He was supervised by Suzanne DeCastell, a Canadian philosopher of education. As he reached the end of his Ph.D., he received a job offer from James Cook University in Australia. He moved there in 1984 and became the first non-white professor on faculty. Luke taught reading/language arts methods and was assigned to the Aboriginal and Torres Strait Islander teacher education program. Luke taught and worked with an important generation of Aboriginal and Torres Strait Islander teachers, researchers and educational leaders. In 2013, he chaired and co-authored the most extensive empirical study of Australian Indigenous school reform to date, leading to a comprehensive research report to the federal government.

== Awards and honors ==
- 1989 Educational Press Association of America Merit Award
- 2000 Honorary Doctorate of Philosophy Rajabhat University, Thailand
- 2001 Annual Radford Lecture, Australian Association for Research in Education
- 2002 Inducted into the International Reading Association Hall of Fame
- 2002 Honorary Professorship from Beijing Normal University
- 2002 Gold Medal of Australian College of Education
- 2003 IBM/Bulletin Australian Educator of the Year
- 2005 Honorary Doctorate of Laws from Simon Fraser University
- 2005 American Educational Research Association Curriculum Studies Book Award
- 2011 Distinguished Research Address, American Educational Research Association
- 2012 Honorary Professorship from Beijing Normal University
- 2013 Honorary Lifetime Member – Queensland Teachers' Union
- 2013 Award for Research Excellence – Australian Literacy Educators' Association
- 2014 Honorary Doctorate of Education from James Cook University
- 2015 Officer of the Order of Australia
- 2016 Distinguished Scholar Lifetime Achievement Award – Literacy Research Association (US)

== Suggested further reading ==
see: http://eprints.qut.edu.au/view/person/Luke,_Allan.html

- Albright, J. & Luke, A. (Eds) (2008) Pierre Bourdieu and Literacy Education. New York: Routledge.
- Baker, C.D. & Luke, A. (Eds) (1991) Towards a Critical Sociology of Reading. Amsterdam: John Benjamins.
- Baldauf, R. & Luke, A. (Eds) (1990) Language Planning and Education in Australasia and the South Pacific. Clevedon, UK: Multilingual Matters.
- Carrington, V. & Luke, A. (1997). Literacy and Bourdieu's sociological theory: A reframing. Language and Education, 11(2), 96–112.
- de Castell, S.C., Luke, A., & Egan, K. (Eds) (1986) Literacy, Society and Schooling. Cambridge: Cambridge University Press.
- de Castell, S.C., Luke, A., & Luke, C. (Eds) (1989) Language Authority and Criticism: Readings on the school textbook. London: Falmer Press.
- Freebody, P., & Luke, A. (1990). Literacies programs: Debates and demands in cultural context. Prospect: Australian Journal of TESOL, 5(7), 7–16.
- Green, B., Hodgens, J., & Luke, A. (1994) Debating Literacy in Australia : a documentary history, 1945 - 1994. Sydney: Australian Literacy Federation.
- Luke, A. (1993) The Social Construction of Literacy in the Primary School. Melbourne: Macmillan.
- Luke, Allan (2008) Another ethnic autobiography? Childhood and the cultural economy of looking. In: Hammer, R. & Kellner, D. (Eds.) Critical Cultural Studies Reader. Peter Lang, New York.
- Luke, A. (2004). Two takes on the critical. In B. Norton & K. Toohey (Eds.), Critical pedagogy and language learning. Cambridge: Cambridge University Press.
- Luke, A. (2003). Literacy and the other: A sociological approach to literacy research and policy in multilingual societies. Reading Research Quarterly, 38(1), 132–141.
- Luke, A. (2003). After the marketplace: Evidence, social science and educational research. Australian Educational Researcher, 30(2), 87–107.
- Luke, A. (2000). Critical literacy in Australia: A matter of context and standpoint. Journal of Adolescent & Adult Literacy, 43 (5), 448–461.
- Luke, A. (1997). Genres of power: Literacy education and the production of capital. In R. Hasan & G. Williams (Eds.), Literacy in society (pp. 308–338). London: Longman.
- Luke, A. (1988) Literacy, Textbooks and Ideology: Postwar literacy instruction and the mythology of Dick and Jane. London: Falmer.
- Luke, A. (1992). Reading and Critical Literacy: Redefining the "Great Debate". Paper of the 18th New Zealand Conference on Reading. Wellington. May 10–13, 1992. Full text available from ERIC.
- Luke, A. (2018) Critical Literacy, Schooling and Social Justice. New York: Routledge.
- Luke, A. (2019) Educational Policy, Narrative and Discourse. New York: Routledge.
- Luke, A. Cazden, C. et al. (2013) A summative evaluation of the Stronger Smarter Learning Project, vols. 1 and 2. Brisbane/Canberra: Queensland University of Technology/Department of Employment, Education and Vocational Training. (http://eprints.qut.edu.au/statistics/eprint/59535/)
- Luke, A. & Gilbert, P. (Eds) (1991) Literacy in Contexts. Sydney: Allen & Unwin.
- Luke, A., O'Brien, J., & Comber, B. (1994). Making community texts objects of study. Australian Journal of Language and Literacy, 17(2), 139–149.
- Luke, A., Woods, A. & Weir, K. (2012) Curriculum, Syllabus Design and Equity. New York: Routledge.
- Milojevic, I., Luke, A., Luke, C., Mills, M., & Land, R. (2002) Moving Forward: Students and teachers against racism. Melbourne: Eleanor Curtin Publishers.
- Mu, G.M., Dooley, K. & Luke, A. (2019) Bourdieu and Chinese Education. New York: Routledge.
- Muspratt, S., Luke, A., & Freebody, P. (1997) Constructing critical literacies. Sydney: Allen & Unwin; and Cresskills, NJ: Hampton.
- New London Group (1996). A pedagogy of multiliteracies: Designing social futures. Harvard Educational Review 66(1), 60–89.
- Nozaki, Y., Openshaw, R., & Luke, A. (Eds) (2005) Struggles Over Difference: Curriculum, texts and pedagogy in the Asia-Pacific. Albany, NY: State University of New York Press.
