= Disappearance of Robin Graham =

Disappearance of American student

Robin Graham
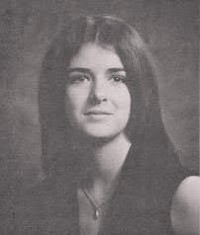
- High school graduation photograph
- Born: Robin Ann Graham; June 22, 1952; Los Angeles, California, U.S.
- Disappeared: November 15, 1970 (aged 18); Los Angeles, California, U.S.
- Status: Missing for 55 years, 11 months and 8 days
- Known for: Missing person
- Parent: Beverly Graham (mother)
- Relatives: Heather Graham (sister)

Robin Ann Graham (June 22, 1952 – disappeared November 15, 1970) is an American student and missing person. She was last seen on a Los Angeles freeway in the early hours of November 15, 1970 after her car had broken down. She has not been heard from since, nor are there any clues as to her whereabouts or subsequent fate. Graham's case is often included in television programs focusing on missing persons.

California Highway Patrol (CHP) officers had earlier noted Graham stranded beside her vehicle and had stopped several times and talked with her. They did not stop one final time when they observed her talking with a young man, now believed likely involved in her abduction. Their actions were consistent with existing policy, which was modified after Graham's disappearance to better ensure the safety of stranded female motorists.

== Disappearance ==
Graham was a graduate of John Marshall High School and a student at Pierce College. At the time of her disappearance, Graham had long brown hair, brown eyes, fair skin and was 5'6" in height.

Locations
1 last sighting

Graham was last seen by California Highway Patrol officers at approximately 2:00 a.m. on November 15, 1970, beside the vehicle she had been driving on the shoulder of the southbound Hollywood Freeway near the Santa Monica Boulevard off ramp in Los Angeles, California. Graham had been out on a date Saturday night and got a ride back to her car at 1:45 a.m, which was parked at her workplace, Pier 1 Imports. While heading home, her vehicle stalled at 2:00 a.m. Graham was last seen receiving mechanical assistance from a dark-haired white male, who was estimated to be in his mid-twenties and who drove a late 1950s model Chevrolet Corvette C1, pale blue or green with primer. The man appeared to try and help Graham get the car started, but gave up and they both rode off in his car.

Graham had earlier used a call box to ask a CHP emergency operator to let her parents know she had run out of fuel. Graham's younger sister took the call and relayed the information to her parents upon their return home at approximately 2:30 a.m. They went immediately to the site where they had found Robin's car, but she had disappeared and the vehicle was locked.

No note was found on her locked car. The CHP officers had seen Graham several times earlier and spoke with her, but officers had not stopped when they saw her talking with the young man. The patrolmen assumed the young man with Graham was the person she had called for help. The CHP officers were acting in accordance with policy of the era. As a result of this case, CHP policy was changed to ensure the safety of stranded female motorists. The initial missing persons report had Graham leaving voluntarily in the Corvette, which was confirmed by the CHP officer who said she appeared to willingly be in the Corvette.

After the Los Angeles Times did a story on her disappearance, a woman wrote a letter to Graham's parents and said she, too, had stalled on the road. The letter writer said a man driving a Corvette approached and claimed to be an off-duty police detective and offered her a ride. The woman refused his offer. It is not known if this man is the same person as the man last seen with Graham. The woman identified former Manson Family member Bruce McGregor Davis as the man she saw. He has not been charged in relation to Graham's case.

=== Potentially linked cases ===
Graham's case was handled by detectives at the Rampart Division of the Los Angeles Police Department who thought Graham's disappearance was possibly linked to a number of other similar cases involving young women during the same time. The crimes involved female motorists throughout California who were attacked by an unidentified male perpetrator who targeted the drivers by offering help while they were vulnerable. None of the other cases have been solved and some of the victims were found dead in the Hollywood Hills. The cases are as follows:

- On May 18, 1969, Rose Tashman, a 19-year-old Israeli-born student at San Fernando Valley State College, disappeared a few miles from the location of Graham's car. Tashman's vehicle was found abandoned after it had broken down with a flat left tire at around 2:00 a.m. on her way from a friend's home in Van Nuys to her home in Hollywood, coming to a stop on the Hollywood Freeway at the Highland Avenue offramp. Flares had been set round the car. Tashman's naked body was found at 6:00 p.m. that day in a ravine within the Hollywood Hills at Mulholland Drive. She had been strangled with a panty and raped.
- Cheri Jo Bates, 18, was stabbed to death and nearly decapitated on October 30, 1966, at Riverside City College in Riverside. The following morning at about 6:30 a.m., a groundskeeper located Cheri's body on a gravel driveway close to the library. She had been stabbed in the chest, back, and abdomen after being beaten, kicked, and stomped in the head, face, and feet. Moreover, her throat had been cut. Her body was found fully dressed, with nothing missing. Police discovered Cheri's Volkswagen Bug with the keys still in the ignition and three library books on the passenger's seat about 100 yards from where she was found dead. The car's ignition system, which included the distributor coil and engine condenser, had been torn out. Authorities conjectured that Cheri's assailant had disabled her vehicle and was waiting for her to get back from the library before returning to it. At one-point, Riverside police investigated a possible link to the Zodiac Killer after they noticed a number of similarities in Cheri's murder and those associated with the serial killer. However, her murder still remains unsolved.
- Months before Graham's disappearance, 19-year-old Cindy Lee Mellin was last seen on January 20, 1970, in the parking lot of the Buenaventura Shopping Centre; she worked there as a sales clerk at Broadway Department Store. She left work shortly after closing and was last seen standing next to her car at 9:40 p.m. She was accompanied by an unknown Caucasian man between 30-and-40-years-old. The man drove a light-coloured vehicle. He appeared to be helping to replace Mellin's left rear tire. Mellin has vanished without a trace after failing to return home from work. When her father arrived at the shopping centre the following morning at 7:00 a.m., he saw her car parked on the bumper jack with the flat tire still in place. Nearby, on the ground, was the spare tire. A sharp object had perforated the sidewall of Mellin's flat tire. She was not at the scene, and no one has ever heard from her again.
- At around 11:15 p.m. on March 22, 1970, Kathleen Johns, 22, was driving west on Highway 132 near Interstate 5 in Modesto with her 10-month-old daughter, when she observed a late-model vehicle, light in colour, following her. The other vehicle followed her as she stopped. With a tire iron in his hand, a man exited his vehicle and approached Johns' vehicle. The person said to Johns, "Your rear wheel is wobbling. I'll tighten the lugs." Johns remained in the vehicle as the man used the tire iron to repair the wheel. The individual then informed her that the wheel had been mended and that she could continue. The car's wheel came off as she tried to back up. When Johns got out, she saw that there was only one bolt holding the wheel in place. Then the man came back and offered to take her to a service station. Johns got into the suspect's car with her daughter. However, the man instead drove around on side roads in the area for approximately 1 1/2 hours. According to a police report on the incident, the man was friendly and not threatening, but several times when Johns asked if he intended to stop at a service station, the man would "merely elude the question and start talking about something else." Johns started to feel scared and worried that the man was going to hurt her. She said she was going to be sick as he slowed down for a stop sign before opening the car door and leaping out with her daughter. She fled from the man and hid in a neighbouring field. After closing the passenger door, the suspect sped off. Johns was able to flag down a passing car, and the officers took her to a police station so she could report the incident. Johns was inconsolable and sobbing uncontrollably when she was interviewed by the police. At one point, she noticed a wanted poster with a police composite sketch of the Zodiac Killer on the wall and said, "That's the man!" Police later found her car near Byrd Road and Highway 132, totally burned. The Zodiac Killer took credit for this incident in a letter written on July 24, 1970.
- 19-year-old Christine Marie Eastin went missing from Hayward, California, on January 18, 1971. She left her home at 10:00 p.m. to go to a car wash and then pick up her friend at a local restaurant. She never arrived to pick up her friend. The vehicle she drove was found at a car wash located at 25400 Mission Boulevard in Hayward. Her purse was locked inside the vehicle. A witness in 2019 reported seeing two men in a white van at the car wash on the night of Eastin's disappearance. She claimed she only saw the driver and the man loading Eastin into the back of the truck. Her disappearance is being investigated as a homicide.
- Ernestine Francis Terello, 43, a Californian housewife, pulled over her 1969 yellow Plymouth due to a flat tire in Agoura, California on April 28, 1972, when she was trying to go shopping at the Topanga Plaza Centre. She was reported missing later that day by her husband and her car was found locked and abandoned near the Agoura Road and Chesboro Road on the Ventura freeway five days later. Her body was discovered on May 27 by Boy Scouts hiking near Yerba Buena Road, off the Pacific Coast Highway about a mile north of the Los Angeles County line, and six miles from where her vehicle was located. Due to the severe decomposition of her remains, her cause of death was not determined. However, authorities strongly suspected that she had been kidnapped from her disabled vehicle and that she had then been sexually assaulted and murdered.
- Mona Jean Gallegos, 22, a Wilson High School graduate and part-time waitress, was murdered on June 19, 1975, after visiting a male auto-salesman friend in Alhambra, California with regards to purchasing a new vehicle. She left the acquaintance's residence at 1:00 a.m. to return to her Covina residence at 4944 Vincent Avenue. Sometime during the early morning hours, she ran out of fuel near Santa Anita Avenue on the eastbound San Bernardino Freeway, in El Monte. Her car was later located by Highway Patrol locked and abandoned at about 4:45 a.m. Police theorised that a motorist had offered Gallegos a ride to a service station nearby that was open all night, before abducting her. Gallegos' friend was cleared of any suspicion. The skeletal remains of Gallegos were found nearly six months later by two teenage boys who were hiking in a remote Riverside ravine. A cause of death could not be determined and there was no trauma to the bones.

== Aftermath ==
Seventeen years after Graham's disappearance, an advertisement appeared in the Los Angeles Times classifieds which caught the attention of the Graham family as well as KFI disc jockey Geoff Edwards, who read it on the air: "DEAREST ROBIN You ran out of gas on the Hollywood Frwy. A man in a Corvette pulled over to help. You've not been seen of since. It's been 17 years, but it's always just yesterday. Still looking for you (signed) THE ECHO PARK DUCKS."

It was later revealed the ad had been placed by Al Medrano, a high school friend of Graham's, to demonstrate people still remembered her and hoped for answers in her case.

== See also ==
- List of people who disappeared mysteriously: post-1970
- The Doe Network
