= List of geographical knobs =

Knob is used in the name of many geographical features:

- Knob Creek can refer to any of several streams by that name
- Knob Fork, West Virginia, an unincorporated community in Wetzel County, West Virginia, United States
- Knob Hill, a neighborhood in central Colorado Springs, Colorado
- Knob Hill, Alberta, municipal district in central Alberta, Canada, south of Edmonton
- Knob Lake, the central lake in Three Lakes Valley in northeast Signy Island
- Knob Lick, Casey County, Kentucky, unincorporated community in Casey County, Kentucky, United States
- Knob Lick, Estill County, Kentucky, an unincorporated community in Estill County, Kentucky, United States
- Knob Lick, Metcalfe County, Kentucky, an unincorporated community in Metcalfe County, Kentucky, United States
- Knob Lick, Missouri, an unincorporated community in southern Saint Francois County, Missouri
- Knob Mountain (Pennsylvania), a ridge in the northeastern part of Columbia County, Pennsylvania
- Knob Mountain (Page County, Virginia), a mountain in Page County, Virginia
- Knob Noster, Missouri, a city in Johnson County, Missouri, United States
- Knob Point (Ross Island), a rounded coastal point on the west side of Hut Point Peninsula, Ross Island
- Knob Point (South Sandwich Islands), the southwesternmost point of Vindication Island in the South Sandwich Islands
- Knob, Arkansas, unincorporated community in Clay County, Arkansas
- Knobs, West Virginia, an unincorporated community in Monroe County, West Virginia, United States
- Knobs region, located in the US state of Kentucky
- Knobs State Forest, a United States forest located in Bullitt County, Kentucky

A number of mountains and hills are described as knobs, as are their associated settlements:

== A ==
- Artillery Knob, a mountain in the Cradle Mountain-Lake St Clair National Park in Tasmania, Australia

== B ==
- Bake Oven Knob, a high point on the Blue Mountain Ridge of the Appalachian Mountains in Lehigh County, Pennsylvania
- Baker Knob, a small rounded coastal elevation north of Harrison Nunatak at the east end of Thurston Island
- Bald Knob, the highest summit of Back Allegheny Mountain in Pocahontas County, West Virginia
- Bald Knob, Arkansas, a city in White County, Arkansas, United States
- Bald Knob, Franklin County, VA, a summit located in Franklin County, Virginia
- Bald Knob, West Virginia, an unincorporated community in Boone County, West Virginia, United States
- Bald Knob Wilderness, a 5,973-acre parcel of land listed as a Wilderness Area of the United States
- Barton Knob, a mountain summit located on Cheat Mountain in southeastern Randolph County, West Virginia
- Beelick Knob, West Virginia, unincorporated community and coal town in Fayette County, West Virginia, United States
- Bens Knob runs southwest northeast through Hampshire County in West Virginia's Eastern Panhandle
- Benson Knob, a distinctive rocky hill at the south extremity of Ricker Hills in the Prince Albert Mountains, Victoria Land
- Bickle Knob, a mountain summit located east of Elkins in Randolph County, West Virginia
- Black Balsam Knob, in the Pisgah National Forest southwest of Asheville, NC
- Black Knob, a big black rock outcrop west of Twin Crater on Hut Point Peninsula, Ross Island
- Blue Knob (Pennsylvania), a Pennsylvania summit with a broad dome in the range of Allegheny Mountains
- Blue Knob State Park, a 6,128-acre Pennsylvania state park in Kimmel, Lincoln
- Brier Knob (Avery County, North Carolina), a mountain in the North Carolina High Country
- Bryant Knob Formation, geologic formation in Missouri
- Burnt Knob, 739 acre municipal park in Louisville, Kentucky, United States
- Butler Knob, a peak on the Jacks Mountain ridge in south central Pennsylvania in the United States

== C ==
- Celo Knob, the northernmost major peak in the Black Mountains of western North Carolina
- Chestnut Knob, West Virginia, an unincorporated community in Mercer County, West Virginia, United States
- Clarks Knob, a summit in Franklin County, Pennsylvania
- Cox's Knob, neighborhood on the south side of Louisville, Kentucky, USA
- Crossing Knob, a mountain in the North Carolina High Country, west from the community of Sugar Grove
- Cuckoo's Knob, small village and civil parish in the Vale of Pewsey, Wiltshire, England

== D ==
- Dick's Knob, the third-highest peak in the State of Georgia
- Dorsey Knob, a mountain summit located at the southern edge of Morgantown in Monongalia County, West Virginia, United States
- Double Spring Knob, the tenth-highest peak in Georgia, USA
- Douglas Knob, an isolated mountain peak in the southwest section of Yellowstone National Park
- Dowdell's Knob, 9,049 acres (36.62 km^{2}) Georgia state park located near Pine Mountain and Warm Springs

== E ==
- Ehlers Knob, a small but conspicuous ice-covered knob which surmounts the west part of the north coast of Dustin Island
- Elk Knob (Watauga County, North Carolina), a mountain in the North Carolina High Country, north of the community of Meat Camp
- Elliott Knob, one of the highest mountains in the northern portions of the U.S. state of Virginia

== F ==
- Fairlies Knob National Park, a national park in Queensland, Australia, 231 km north of Brisbane
- Floyds Knobs, Indiana, a small unincorporated town in Lafayette Township, Floyd County, Indiana
- Frenchman Knob, summit in Hart County, Kentucky, in the United States

== G ==
- Gap in Knob, Kentucky, unincorporated community located in Bullitt County, Kentucky, United States
- Gaudineer Knob, a mountain summit on the Randolph/Pocahontas County line in eastern West Virginia, USA
- Gobbler's Knob is a prominent geographical landmark in the San Bernardino National Forest of California.
- Gobbler's Knob Fire Lookout, a fire lookout in the extreme western region of Mount Rainier National Park
- Gobblers Knob, a succession of groundhogs in Punxsutawney, Pennsylvania
- Grassy Knob Wilderness, a wilderness area in the Klamath Mountains of southwestern Oregon, within the Rogue River-Siskiyou National Forest
- Grays Knob, Kentucky, unincorporated community and coal town in Harlan County, Kentucky, United States
- Green River Knob, the tallest point in the Knobs region of Kentucky, USA

== H ==
- Hairy Knob, summit in Mason County, Texas, in the United States
- Harrison Knob, a small mountain in the Lower Mainland region of British Columbia, Canada
- Hendersin Knob, an ice-covered knob rising between the heads of Craft and Rochray Glaciers in the southwest part of Thurston Island
- Henry's Knob, a mountain and Superfund Alternative Site in York County South Carolina
- High Knob, the peak of Stone Mountain, part of a large mountain, or massif, in Wise County, Virginia
- High Knob (Blue Ridge, Virginia), a peak of the Blue Ridge Mountains in Warren and Fauquier county, Virginia
- High Knob (West Virginia), a mountain summit on the border between Hampshire and Hardy counties in West Virginia's Eastern Panhandle
- Howard Knob, a mountain in the North Carolina High Country, located in the town of Boone

== I ==
- Iron Knob, South Australia, a town in South Australia on the Eyre Highway across Eyre Peninsula

== J ==
- Jacks Knob, a mountain located on the border of Towns County and Union County, Georgia
- Jacks Knob Trail, a hiking trail that has been designated as a National Recreation Trail in Georgia
- Jeptha Knob, the highest point in the Bluegrass region of Kentucky
- Junction Knob, a small but distinctive peak at the junction of Odin Glacier and Alberich Glacier neve areas in the Asgard Range, Victoria Land

== K ==
- Keeney Knob, a mountain of the Ridge-and-Valley Appalachians in Summers County, West Virginia
- Kentuck Knob, a residence designed by the American architect Frank Lloyd Wright in Pennsylvania, USA
- Kile Knob, the highest point on North Fork Mountain in West Virginia
- Kinton Knob, a peak in Bedford County, Pennsylvania

== L ==
- Lord Hereford's Knob, a mountain in south-east Wales, in the Black Mountains

== M ==
- Marks Knob, a mountain in the Great Smoky Mountains, in the southeastern United States
- McAfee Knob, feature of Catawba mountain in Catawba, Roanoke County, Virginia on the Appalachian Trail
- Moore's Knob, the highest mountain in the Sauratown Mountains of Stokes County, North Carolina
- Matney Knob, a mountain-like feature near Norfork, Arkansas

== N ==
- Nausea Knob, a prominent outcropping of jumbled rocks on the northwest upper slope of the active cone of Mount Erebus, Ross Island
- Nicodemus Knob, rough, lozenge-shaped 30-feet pillar left at East Cliff on the Isle of Portland, Dorset, England
- North Knob, the highest peak in eastern Pennsylvania, east of Susquehanna River

== O ==
- Old Butt Knob, summit in Haywood County, North Carolina, in the United States

== P ==
- Parnell Knob, a mountain in the Ridge and Valley Appalachians region of south central Pennsylvania
- Penobscot Knob, a hill located near Mountain Top, Pennsylvania and Wilkes-Barre, Pennsylvania
- Pilgrim's Knob, Virginia, an unincorporated community in Buchanan County, Virginia, United States
- Pillow Knob, a peak protruding through the snow cover at the northeast end of Williams Hills in the Neptune Range, Pensacola Mountains
- Pilot Knob, Missouri, a city in Iron County, Missouri, United States
- Pilot Knob, Texas, a small unincorporated community in southern Travis County, Texas, United States
- Pilot Knob, Wisconsin, ghost town in the town of Richfield, Adams County, Wisconsin, United States
- Pilot Knob (Austin, Texas), a hill that is part of an extinct volcano located seven miles south of central Austin, Texas
- Pilot Knob (Imperial County, California), a peak in Imperial County, California
- Pilot Knob (Iron County, Missouri), located in the Arcadia Valley of Iron County, Missouri
- Pilot Knob Township, Washington County, Illinois, located in Washington County, Illinois
- Pine Knob, a downhill ski area in Clarkston, Michigan
- Pine Knob (Pennsylvania), a peak in the Allegheny Mountains of Pennsylvania
- Pine Knob, Wisconsin, unincorporated community in the town of Utica, Crawford County, Wisconsin, United States
- Pores Knob, a mountain peak located in Wilkes County, North Carolina
- Purcell Knob, a spur of the Blue Ridge Mountain in Loudoun County, Virginia

== R ==
- Rattlesnake Knob, summit in Sauk County, Wisconsin, in the United States
- Red Knob, Roane County, West Virginia, unincorporated community in Roane County, West Virginia
- Reddish Knob of Shenandoah Mountain is one of the highest points in Virginia
- Rich Knob, located in Towns County, Georgia
- Ritchey Knob, a summit located on the Blue Knob massif
- River Knobs (West Virginia), a ridge and series of knobs in western Pendleton County, West Virginia, USA
- Roan High Knob, the highpoint of the Roan-Unaka Range of the Southern Appalachian Mountains
- Rocky Knob (Georgia), eight different mountain peaks located in the North Georgia mountains
- Rocky Knob AVA, an American Viticultural Area in a mountainous area east of the Blue Ridge Parkway in southwest Virginia
- Roper's Knob Fortifications, constructed by Union Army forces between February and May 1863 in Franklin, Tennessee
- Round Knob, Illinois, an unincorporated community in Massac County, Illinois, United States

== S ==
- Scutchamer Knob, an early Iron Age round barrow on the Ridgeway National Trail at East Hendred Down in the English county of Oxfordshire
- Shell Knob, Missouri, a census-designated place in Stone counties in the U.S. state of Missouri
- Shell Knob Township, Barry County, Missouri, one of twenty-five townships in Barry County, Missouri, USA
- Sidneys Knob, an atypical mountain for Pennsylvania
- Signal Knob (Virginia), the northern peak of Massanutten Mountain in the Ridge and Valley Appalachians
- Smith Knob, a partly snow-covered rock peak south-southeast of Mendenhall Peak in the east part of the Thiel Mountains
- Spruce Knob, the highest point in the state of West Virginia and the summit of Spruce Mountain, the tallest mountain in the Alleghenies
- Stark's Knob, a basaltic pillow lava formation near Schuylerville, New York, United States
- Stuart Knob, mountain located within Banff National Park in the Canadian Rockies
- Stuffley Knob (Johnson County, Kentucky), the tallest mountain in Johnson County, Kentucky
- Sugar Tree Knob, Tennessee, unincorporated community in Cannon County, Tennessee, United States
- Sugarloaf Knob, a well-known summit within Ohiopyle State Park on the south end of the Laurel Ridge

== T ==
- The Knob (Indiana) (elevation 1,051 feet/320 meters) is the fourth highest point in the U.S. state of Indiana
- The Knob (South Georgia), a conspicuous dome-shaped rock, 40 m high, at the west side of Elsehul on the north coast of South Georgia
- Tomkins Knob, a mountain in the North Carolina High Country, near the community of Deep Gap
- Tricorner Knob, a mountain in the Great Smoky Mountains, located in the Southeastern United States
- Trimble Knob, located southwest of Monterey, VA, in Highland County, is a conical hill
- Trischman Knob, an isolated summit along the Continental Divide on the Madison Plateau in Yellowstone National Park
- Turkey Knob, West Virginia, unincorporated community and coal town in Fayette County, West Virginia, United States
- Twelve O'clock Knob (Roanoke County, Virginia), a mountain located in southwestern Roanoke County, Virginia

== V ==
- Ventifact Knobs, minor knobs located just east of Lake Bonney in Taylor Valley, Victoria Land

== W ==
- Walsh Knob, a small but distinctive ice-covered elevation that rises midway along the south side of Lofgren Peninsula in east Thurston Island
- Waterrock Knob, a mountain peak in the U.S. state of North Carolina
- Webster Knob, a prominent rock knob at the head of Strom Glacier in the Queen Maud Mountains
- Weed Patch Knob, the third highest summit in the U.S. state of Indiana
- White Knob Formation, geologic formation in Idaho
- White Knob, Idaho, ghost town in Custer County, Idaho
- Woody's Knob, a summit or "knob" in the Blue Ridge Mountains in Mitchell County, North Carolina

== Y ==
- Yorkeys Knob, Queensland, one of the beach suburbs of Cairns, the regional capital of Far North Queensland, Australia
- Young Lick Knob, a mountain that lies in three Georgia counties, Habersham, Rabun and Towns

== See also ==
- Knob Creek (bourbon), a brand of Kentucky straight bourbon whiskey produced by Beam Inc. at the Jim Beam distillery in Clermont, Kentucky
- Knob mudalia, a species of freshwater snail in the family Pleuroceridae
- Knob-billed duck, an unusual, pan-tropical duck
- Knob-billed fruit dove, a species of bird in the family Columbidae
- Dorset Knob, a hard dry savoury biscuit made by Moores Biscuits, in the county of Dorset in England
- Expert Knob Twiddlers, an ambient-techno album by Mike Paradinas and Richard D. James
- Hip-knob, in architecture, is the finial on the hip of a roof, between the barge-boards of a gable
- "Insert Knob A In Hole B", a science fiction short story by Isaac Asimov

Disambiguation pages

- Knob (disambiguation)
- The Knob (disambiguation)
