= Frenchman (disambiguation) =

A Frenchman is a French person.

Frenchman may also refer to:

== Places ==
- Frenchman, Nevada, an unincorporated community
- Frenchman Bay, Maine
- Frenchman Bay, within King George Sound (Western Australia)
- Frenchman Butte, Saskatchewan, Canada
- Frenchman Creek (disambiguation)
- Frenchman Hills, Washington
- Frenchman Island, New York
- Frenchman Lake (disambiguation)
- Frenchman Mountain, Nevada
- Frenchman's Pass, Aruba
- Frenchman Range, a mountain range in Nevada
- Frenchman River, Saskatchewan, Canada

== Fictional characters ==
- The Merovingian, also known as "The Frenchman", a minor character in The Matrix series
- The Frenchman (The Boys), also known as "Frenchie", a major character in The Boys series

== Other uses ==
- Nap Lajoie (1874-1959), American Hall-of-Fame Major League Baseball player nicknamed "The Frenchman"
- Viktor Pylypenko (soldier) (born 1986-87), Ukrainian soldier and LGBTQ+ activist nicknamed "the Frenchman"
- "The Frenchman", an episode of the TV series Bonanza
- The Frenchman, a 1976 novel by Velda Johnston
- The Frenchman, a 1997 novelization by Elizabeth Hand of the pilot episode of Millennium

== See also ==
- Scott LeDoux (1940-2011), American politician, heavyweight boxer and professional wrestler nicknamed "The Fighting Frenchman"
- Frenchmans Bluff, a summit in Minnesota
- Frenchmans Cap, a mountain in Tasmania, Australia
- Frenchman's Cay, an island in the British Virgin Islands
- Frenchman Flat, a hydrographic basin in Nevada
- Frenchman Knob, a summit in Kentucky
