= The Knob =

The Knob may refer to:

- The Knob (Indiana)
- The Knob (Montana), a mountain in Custer County, Montana
- The Knob (Greene County, New York)
- The Knob (Oneida County, New York)
- The Knob (South Georgia)
- "The Knob", a character in Squeeze Me (novel)
- The bottom end of the handle of a baseball bat, see Glossary of baseball terms#bat

== See also ==
- List of geographical knobs
- Knob (disambiguation)
- The Knobs
- The Knobz, New Zealand pop band
