= Bald Knob (disambiguation) =

Bald Knob is a summit in West Virginia.

Bald Knob may also refer to:

== Mountain summits ==
- Bald Knob (Missouri), U.S.
- Bald Knob (Franklin County, Virginia), U.S.

== Populated places ==
- Bald Knob, Queensland, Australia
- Bald Knob, Arkansas, U.S.
- Bald Knob, West Virginia, U.S.

== Other uses ==
- Bald Knob National Wildlife Refuge, a wildlife refuge in White County, Arkansas
- Bald Knob Wilderness, a wilderness area in the Shawnee National Forest, Illinois
- Bald Knob Cross, a large white cross in Alto Pass, Illinois

== See also ==
- Bald Knobbers, a 19th-century group of vigilantes in Missouri
