= Knob Lick =

Knob Lick may refer to:

- Knob Lick, Casey County, Kentucky, a ghost town in Casey County, Kentucky
- Knob Lick, Estill County, Kentucky, an unincorporated community in Estill County, Kentucky
- Knob Lick, Metcalfe County, Kentucky, an unincorporated community in Metcalfe County, Kentucky
- Knob Lick, Missouri, an unincorporated community in Saint Francois County, Missouri
