= Red Knob =

Red Knob may refer to:

- Red Knob (amplifier), a type of Fender amplifier
- Red Knob (Custer County, Montana), a mountain in Custer County
- Red Knob (Madison County, Montana), a mountain in Madison County
- Red Knob, West Virginia, unincorporated community in Roane County
