= Nobs =

Nobs or NOBS may refer to:

- The Nobs, an English rock music group
- NOBS, sodium nonanoyloxybenzenesulfonate, an ingredient in cleaning products
- Nobs (surname), a family name common in Switzerland

== See also ==
- Nob (disambiguation)
