= Bread Loaf =

Bread Loaf may refer to:

- Loaf
- Bread Loaf, Vermont
- Bread Loaf Mountain in Vermont
- Breadloaf Wilderness in Vermont
- Bread Loaf School of English at Middlebury College
- Bread Loaf Writers' Conference, held annually at the Bread Loaf Inn, near Bread Loaf Mountain in Vermont
- Loaf of Bread Butte, a mountain in Montana

== See also ==
- Bread
- Bread loafing, a method of processing surgical specimens for histopathology
