= Post Rock =

Post Rock may refer to:

- Post-rock, a form of experimental rock music
- Post Rock (South Georgia), a small promontory near the west end of South Georgia
- Post Rock Limestone, a historic stone post material from Kansas
- Post Rock Scenic Byway, named for the abundant stone posts in the landscape
