= Nube =

Nube(s) can refer to the following:

== People and characters ==
- Nephele (Nube in Latin), a nymph in Greek mythology
- Nūbē, a character in Hell Teacher Nūbē
- a variation of newbie

== Other uses ==
- National Union of Bank Employees
- The Clouds (or Nubes in Latin), an ancient Greek comedy by Aristophanes
- Nube Galaxy, a dark galaxy
- "Nubes (song)", a 2021 song by Rauw Alejandro

== See also ==
- Newbie (disambiguation)
- Newby (disambiguation)
- Newb (disambiguation)
- Noob (disambiguation)
