= Funny Girls (burlesque bar) =

Cabaret bar

- Location in Blackpool
- Former names: Blackpool Odeon
- Address: 5 Dickson Road
- Location: Blackpool, Lancashire, England
- Coordinates: 53.8211°N 3.0515°W
- Owner: Basil Newby
- Operator: Basil Newby
- Type: Showbar

Construction
- Opened: 6 May 1939
- Renovated: 2002

Website
- www.funnygirlsshow.co.uk

Funny Girls is a burlesque cabaret bar on the North Shore of Blackpool, England. Created up in 1994, it is owned by English entrepreneur and businessman Basil Newby. The cast of the show is composed of male dancers and drag performers. The showbar is in what was once the Blackpool Odeon, which was Odeon's largest original cinema in the United Kingdom.

== Venue ==
Funny Girls was originally opened in Blackpool 1994 and was located on the corner of Queen Street and The Strand. Funny Girls relocated to the former Odeon Cinema on Dickson Road in 2002.

The cinema was designed by Robert Bullivant and was opened on 6 May 1939. It has a capacity of 3,000 and is the largest original Odeon cinema. It was converted into a 3-screen cinema in 1975. In 1994, the building was registered as a Grade II listed building. The cinema closed on 5 December 1998.

Basil Newby took over the old Odeon in 2002 and had it re-decorated in the traditional Art Deco style. In 2019, Thwaites Brewery took over the venue, but sold it back to Newby later that year.

== Cast ==
DJ Carmen is the host at Funny Girls.

The Funny Girls cast have performed at various platforms including the Royal Variety Performance. They have also appeared in various television shows either to be interviewed, or where the Funny Girls showbar itself has been the backdrop, such as in the BBC Drama Blackpool.

DJ Carmen

Drag queens performing

The cast in August 2026
