= Frenchman's Cay =

Island in the British Virgin Islands

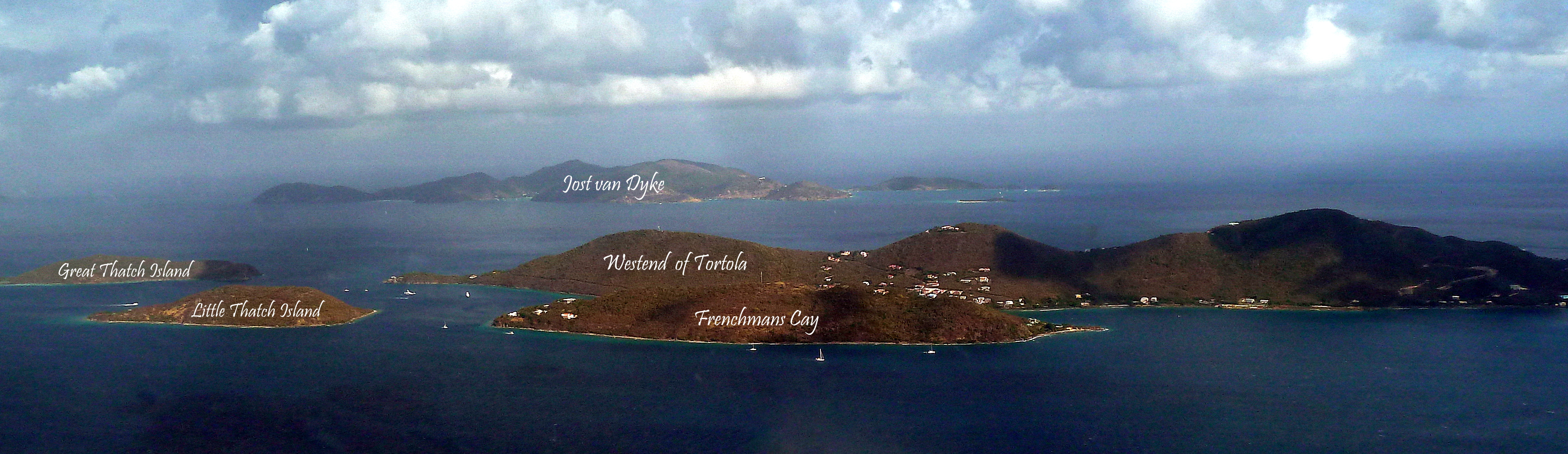
- Frenchman's Cay (front) among neighbouring islands

- The location of Frenchman's Cay within the British Virgin Islands

- Location within British Virgin Islands Location within the Caribbean

Geography
- Location: Caribbean Sea
- Coordinates: 18.383°N 64.700°W
- Archipelago: Virgin Islands

Administration
- United Kingdom
- British Overseas Territory: British Virgin Islands

Additional information
- Time zone: AST (UTC-4)
- ISO code: VG

Frenchman's Cay is an island of the British Virgin Islands in the Caribbean. It is located 2 km (1.2 mi) southeast from Great Thatch and is located just east of Little Thatch by a distance of approximately 400 m (440 yd). Frenchman's Cay is connected to the main island of Tortola by a very short bridge to Tortola's West end. The bridge was demolished and rebuilt by the government of the British Virgin Islands in 2022. The cay is approximately 1.6 km (1 mi) long and about 500 yd (460 m) wide. Frenchman's Cay has a number of houses, restaurants, a yacht harbor, and a resort complex known as Frenchman's hotel.
