= Mark Raymond Harrington =

American archaeologist (1882–1971)

Mark Raymond Harrington (July 6, 1882 – June 30, 1971) was curator of archaeology at the Southwest Museum from 1928 to 1964 and discoverer of ancient Pueblo structures near Overton, Nevada, and Little Lake, California.

== Early life ==
Harrington knew early the rigors and fascinations of academic life. The son of Rose Martha Smith Harrington and Mark Walrod Harrington, a professor of astronomy at the University of Michigan who also held appointments in botany, zoology, and geology, he spent his childhood roaming the area around Ann Arbor, Michigan, his hometown, learning tribal languages from Indian friends and, when his family moved to Mount Vernon, New York, excavating and collecting local artifacts, thus feeding an early and lifelong interest in Native American culture.

== Education and archaeological career ==
When his father's poor health and mental illness forced him to drop out of school, Harrington took some of his finds to Frederic Ward Putnam, then the curator in anthropology at the American Museum of Natural History in New York City. Putnam hired Harrington as an apprentice field archaeologist, a post that eventually allowed him to attend Columbia University, where he studied under the celebrated anthropologist Franz Boas. In 1904, Harrington married Alma V. Cocks. He earned a bachelor of science degree in 1907 and a Master of Arts in anthropology in 1908. That same year, he went to work for George Gustav Heye, the collector of Native American artifacts who later established the Museum of the American Indian in New York City. Harrington spent three years collecting artifacts and documenting tribes in the East and Midwest for Heye. He was assistant curator at the University of Pennsylvania Museum from 1911 to 1915.

In 1912, Harrington met Mabel Dodge Luhan and introduced her and a group of friends to peyote during an impromptu "ceremony" at her apartment in Greenwich Village. Among the participants were anarchist Hutchins Hapgood and his wife, Harrington's cousin, author Neith Boyce Hapgood. This incident became legendary in counterculture circles.

In 1915, Harrington found Patana Cave and native Taíno villagers on eastern Cuba while conducting fieldwork. Later in the 1950s, '60s, and '70s, he brought anthropologists to record the skeletal structure, blood type, and other physical attributes of the villagers.

In 1917, Harrington married Anna Alexander Johns, with whom he had a son, Johns Heye Harrington, born September 5, 1918, and given Anna's maiden name with his middle name recognizing George Gustav Heye. Harrington spent the next 13 years working for Heye as an archaeologist, ethnologist, field collector, and curator in Arkansas, Tennessee, Missouri, Oklahoma, Nevada, Texas, Cuba, and Ecuador.

Beginning in 1925, Harrington made some of his most significant discoveries, ancient dwellings of Pueblo Indians and their precursors, known as “the Basketmakers,” in Nevada. One find was a set of 46 structures, the largest of which contained 100 rooms. Harrington estimated the earliest occupiers to have been there around 1500 BC. More recent studies have determined the artifacts from the site to be much more recent, from between 500 BC to 300 BC. Some of the stone and adobe dwellings appeared to have been made by Pueblo Indians, whose antiquity he also overestimated. Later study showed them to be from 700 to 1150 AD.

Anna died on August 13, 1927, of an unspecified "brief illness." In December of that year, Harrington married Edna L. Parker, a descendant of the famous Seneca religious leader of the Iroquois, Handsome Lake. She was also the sister of Arthur C. Parker, an archaeologist, folklorist, and expert on Native Americans whose Iroquois name was Gawaso Wanneh. Friends knew Edna as Nandaka or Endeka and she often assisted Harrington on excavations.

== Southwest Museum ==
In 1928, Harrington came to Los Angeles to be curator of archaeology at the Southwest Museum, beginning an association that would last until his retirement. During this time, he earned an honorary doctorate from Occidental College. He conducted excavations in Los Angeles, Nevada, and other sites on behalf of the museum. He returned to the site, along the Muddy River, where he had made his earlier discoveries, to conduct a complete survey.

In 1930, Harrington bought the dilapidated Andrés Pico Adobe, also known as the Rómulo Pico Adobe or Ranchito Rómulo, near the San Fernando Rey Mission in the San Fernando Valley. It is one of the oldest residences in Los Angeles. Partial walls still stood, but the floor, roof, a staircase, window, and door frames required rebuilding. Harrington also built an addition to the north wing of the house, put a fireplace in the living room, rebuilt patio walls and added a garage. The couple lived there 15 years.

At the time he undertook the Pico Adobe project, Harrington and a colleague also began to dig in Gypsum Cave in the Frenchman Range in Nevada, where they found Basketmaker artifacts. The archaeologist and ethnologist Bertha Parker (Abenaki, Seneca), who was also Harrington's niece, served as expedition secretary and discovered the skull of an extinct ground sloth. Excavators also found dung along with other parts of the skeleton. Harrington came to the controversial conclusion that humans and the ground sloth had existed at the same time and dated them to 8500 BC. Later studies showed he was in the correct range for the animal bones, but badly mistaken about the human artifacts, which were dated to 900-400 BC. His dating for another site at Tule Springs, near Las Vegas, has equally been called into question. Harrington found a spear point in an apparent fire pit alongside the bones of several ancient animals, which led him to assert in a published article that they were contemporaries and that the site was between 10,000 and 25,000 years old. More recent scrutiny has put his dating in doubt, however.

In 1933, on loan from the museum, Harrington went to work for the National Park Service under the Civilian Conservation Corps. He directed a project to salvage as much as possible of the Pueblo Grande de Nevada archaeological site, also known as Nevada's "Lost City," near Overton, Nevada. The site was about to be destroyed by the new Lake Mead, born of the construction of Hoover Dam. They found 17 new sites and dug until “there was literally water lapping at their boots.”

In 1947, Harrington learned from a friend of an ancient site located about 160 miles northeast of Los Angeles that contained artifacts attributed to the Pinto Culture, believed to have existed in the area as early as 3000 BC. Harrington excavated the location—dubbed the Stahl site for the composer Willy Stahl, its discoverer—for at least the next two years. During this time, on September 20, 1948, Edna died. He married a third time, to author Marie Toma Walsh, on April 23, 1949. Harrington published his report on the Stahl site in 1957.

Harrington retired from the Southwest Museum in 1964. He died in 1971 and is buried at the San Fernando Mission Cemetery in Mission Hills.

== Publications ==
- Certain Caddo Sites in Arkansas. Indian Notes and Monographs. New York: Museum of the American Indian, Heye Foundation, 1920* “The Ozark Bluff-Dwellers.” American Anthropologist 26 (January–March 1924):1–21.
- Religion and ceremonies of the Lenape. New York: Museum of the American Indian, Heye Foundation, 1921.
- "Lovelock Cave." University of California Publication in American Archaeology and Ethnology (1929) : 25(1); Loud, Llewellyn, and M.R. Harrington
- The Ozark Bluff-Dwellers. Indian Notes and Monographs 12. New York: Museum of the American Indian, Heye Foundation, 1960.
- “Reminiscences of an Archeologist.” The Masterkey 36, no. 2 (1962):138–142.
- Dickon among the Lenape Indians. Bell, 1938. Abridged as a Puffin Story Book: Dickon Among the Indians, 1949.
- The Iroquois Trail: Dickon among the Onondagas and Senecas.
