= Newbie (disambiguation) =

A newbie is a slang term for a novice or newcomer.

Newbie may also refer to:

- Newbie, Dumfries and Galloway, including Newbie Barns, a place in Scotland
- A nickname of J.D. (Scrubs)

== See also ==
- Newby (disambiguation)
- Newb (disambiguation)
- Noob (disambiguation)
- Nube (disambiguation)
- Newbee, an eSports team based in China
