= Frenchman Lake =

Frenchman Lake may refer to:

- Frenchman Flat
- Frenchman Lake (California)
- Frenchman Lake (Nova Scotia)
- Frenchman Lake (Yukon)
