= Nevada Industrial Switch =

Small private railroad, in Nevada, United States

Overview
- Headquarters: Las Vegas, Nevada
- Locale: near Lake Mead, Nevada, United States between Apex (UP Milepost 352) - Pabco Gypsum Mine
- Dates of operation: Before 1997–

Technical
- Track gauge: 4 ft 8 1/2 in (1,435 mm) standard gauge

Nevada Industrial Switch is an active private railroad in Nevada, United States. The railroad runs over Union Pacific's former "Fibreboard Spur". The line serves the PABCO Gypsum Mine that produces sheet rock. Nevada Industrial Switch was contracted by PABCO Gypsum to service the mine.

== Directions ==
"Apex" is on Union Pacific Railroad's Caliente Subdivision at Milepost 352. It is located off Exit 58 on Interstate 15/U.S. Route 93 at Apex. Apex is at the top of a 1% grade on the mainline.

== See also ==
- List of Nevada railroads
