= Central Appalachian anomaly =

Area of hot material under Virginia

- The approximate location of the Central Appalachian anomaly
- Country: United States
- State: Virginia, West Virginia
- Province: Appalachian Mountains
- Coordinates: 38°26′10″N 79°19′25″W (approximate)
- Width: 300 kilometres (190 mi)
- Depth: 100–250 kilometres (62–155 mi)
- Last eruption: ~42 Ma Ugly Mountain, WV

The Central Appalachian anomaly or CCA is an area of unusually hot material in the upper mantle under Virginia and West Virginia. This area has been studied using p and s wave behavior which has led to the interpretation of small amounts of magma upwelling under the central Appalachian mountains.

== Geologic history ==
The Appalachian mountains are the result of repeated orogenic and rifting events over the past 1.2 billion years. The ancient supercontinent Rodinia was the first of two major mountain building events. Known as the Grenville Orogeny, it created the first mountain range that would much later become the present day Appalachian mountains.

=== Rifting of Rodinia ===
Around 760 Ma, Rodinia began to rift apart. This resulted in a large flood basalt eruption between 565-555 Ma. This was known as the Catoctin Formation which can still be seen today as green metabasalt rocks. The rifting opened a new ocean known as the Iapetus Ocean.

=== Pangea ===
The next mountain building event took place during 3 separate orogenies: the Taconic Orogeny (~461 to 443 Ma), the Acadian Orogeny, (~406-355 Ma) and the Alleghanian orogeny (~325 to 260 Ma). By 245 Ma, Pangea started to rift apart. But it wasn't until ~201 Ma, that magma made it to the surface in one of Earth's largest flood basalt eruptions: the Central Atlantic magmatic province. This event was the initial stage of what would become the Atlantic Ocean. All of these events played a crucial role in the geology of the Appalachian mountains. These events created numerous zones of weakness along the US East Coast. It also thinned the lithosphere in places, which would eventually allow magma to reach the surface.

== Post rift volcanism ==
The beginning of the Central Appalachian anomaly (CAA) is unknown. After the Newark Supergroup (CAMP) stopped erupting ~201 Ma, the US East Coast became a Passive margin. The Mid-Atlantic Ridge progressively moved off shore, and continues to widen the Atlantic Ocean to present day. However, 2 separate pulses of post rift magmatic events occurred. One ~152 Ma, and the most recent ~47 Ma. Since these eruptions happened in a passive margin, volcanic activity was not expected.

These two volcanic events led geologists to try and understand what was happening below west central Virginia. Research indicated that the present day Appalachian mountains have very different crustal depths. Crustal thickness below the Grenville Terrane is very thick (~140 kilometres (87 mi)). To the east, crustal thickness is thought to be (~110 kilometres (68 mi). Directly beneath the Appalachian mountains however, crustal thickness thins significantly (~80 kilometres (50 mi). It is also offset to the west by ~50 km; directly under the Jurassic and Eocene volcanic centers.

== Theories ==
Many studies have been conducted to understand the CAA. A leading theory is that a small convection pocket in the mantle transports warmer asthenosphere into the thinner crust. As it cools, it will then sink back into the upper mantle. What has been strongly proven is that an upwelling is occurring. The primary evidence is based on seismic tomography maps. These show a region of low-velocity under both New England and Virginia. Large teleseismic P and S wave delays are consistent with temperatures ~770 C (1,418 F) above what the craton temperature is.

Partial melt is estimated to be (~1-2%) in the upper mantle (less than 200 km). This was proven by the electrical conductivity of the anomaly. This can only be explained by the presence of partial melt in the upper mantle. This says that the CCA is the result of lithospheric loss (likely via a gravity-driven Rayleigh–Taylor instability) during the Eocene, with ongoing small-scale mantle flow that has maintained the thin lithosphere through time.

The lower crust in this area may also have lithosphere that is more dense then normal continental crust. The CCA could also act as a removal force of dense continental lithosphere and its replacement with (perhaps continuously upwelling) less dense asthenospheric upper mantle.
