= Rae-rae =

Trans women in Tahitian culture

Rae-rae are transfeminine people in Tahitian culture related to Māhū (meaning "in the middle"), a gender category in Polynesia.

== History ==
=== Connection to French military presence and sex work ===
The development of the Rae-Rae identity coincided with the opening of Fa‘a‘a International Airport and the establishment of the Centre d’Expérimentation du Pacifique (CEP) for nuclear testing, which brought an influx of military personnel and tourists to French Polynesia. This influx led to a booming sex trade, prompting Māhū to adopt a more feminine appearance to attract Frenchmen, thus leading to the distinction of Rae-Rae from traditional Māhū.

The term Rae-Rae emerged in Tahiti in the 1960s to describe a type of Māhū who began expressing their gender more overtly as women in society. Māhū initially provided sexual services to Frenchmen, and over time, those who feminized their gender expression more successfully attracted these foreigners, which led to the emergence of the term "Rae-Rae" to distinguish these more feminized Māhū from others.

== In Polynesian Society ==
=== Comparison with Māhū identity ===
In French Polynesian culture, there are two distinct third-gender categories: Māhū and Rae-Rae. Māhū, indigenous to the Islands, with a long cultural history dating back to the pre-contact period, are often described as "half-man, half-woman," engaging in feminine-coded labor and viewed positively as good advisers and caretakers. Māhū are considered "traditional" and "culturally authentic." While Māhū may dress as men using their given names and occasionally wear women's clothing without typically pursuing body modifications, Rae-Rae are viewed as a more modern category, often living openly as women, adopting women's names, wearing female clothing and makeup, and sometimes undergoing hormone treatment and gender-affirmation surgery. Rae-Rae are often critical of what they perceive as ambiguity and cowardice in Māhū gender expression.

=== Place within French Polynesian society ===
Rae-Rae face varying levels of acceptance across different communities. Unlike Māhū, Rae-Rae often encounter malignment, ridicule, and harassment. On Tahiti, Rae-Rae are frequently marginalized and viewed negatively due to their association with sex work, Western-style transgender identities, and white femininity, which significantly impacts their social acceptance. While they find more acceptance in larger cosmopolitan areas, Rae-Rae face increased marginalization on smaller, conservative islands like Rurutu. On Bora Bora, both Māhū and Rae-Rae are integrated and valued within their families and the tourist industry, with Rae-Rae not being labeled as sex workers despite engaging in similar activities. Although Rae-Rae, like Māhū, are integrated into family structures and social life, they tend to stretch the limits of an accepted third-gender traditional role more than Māhū do. This often leads to Rae-Rae being viewed as incompatible with the traditional Polynesian worldview and sometimes seen as culturally inauthentic due to their associations with French patrons and contemporary lifestyles.

=== Relationships with families ===
Family support is crucial for both Māhū and Rae-Rae individuals in Polynesian society, with Māhū generally experiencing tolerance while Rae-Rae often face rejection and expulsion from their homes. Rae-Rae encounter significant challenges within conservative or religious families, exacerbated by a prevalent belief among older generations that prostitution is their only viable future.

=== Law and recognition of gender identity ===
Despite progressive French laws governing French Polynesia, which provide LGBTQ+ rights and allow legal gender changes without surgery, cultural recognition of Rae-Rae remains limited, especially on smaller islands. Rae-Rae often seek recognition as women rather than a separate third-gender identity, but face negative perceptions in Tahitian society due to their perceived focus on sexuality and Western influences. This lack of acceptance and limited opportunities in conservative communities drive many Rae-Rae to migrate to urban areas or mainland France. Those seeking gender-affirming surgeries often travel abroad to countries like France, Thailand, or Turkey for better healthcare options and lower costs, although these procedures remain expensive.

== Characteristics ==
=== Gender expression and presentation ===
Rae-Rae individuals in Polynesian society express their femininity through various means, characterized by cosmopolitan fashion style and extensive makeup, often emulating Euro-American fashion-model aesthetics. Unlike Māhū, who wear men's clothes and balance masculine and feminine traits, Rae-Rae engage in deliberate feminine expression by adopting female gender roles, wearing women's clothing, and using female names in their daily lives. This commitment to feminine expression extends to participation in transgender beauty contests and taking on roles as advisors on fashion and cosmetics, as well as teachers of traditional dances.

Rae-Rae frequently undergo bodily modifications, including hormone therapy, dieting, breast enlargement, and sometimes gender-affirming surgery, to align their physical appearance with their gender identity. However, the approach to body modification among Rae-Rae is not uniform. While many use hormones to feminize their bodies and seek gender-affirming surgeries, others hesitate due to potential side effects like weight gain or impacts on sexual pleasure.

== Outside French Polynesia ==
=== Intersection with LGBTQ+ identities ===
Both Māhū and Rae-Rae are considered part of the broader LGBTQ+ spectrum in French Polynesia, but they represent different aspects of gender identity. The Rae-Rae identity aligns more closely with Western concepts of transgender women and intersects with Western notions of gay and transgender identities. This Western influence has contributed to a negative perception of Rae-Rae in Tahitian society.
