= Great Thatch ruin =

Coordinates: 18°23′06″N 64°44′20″W

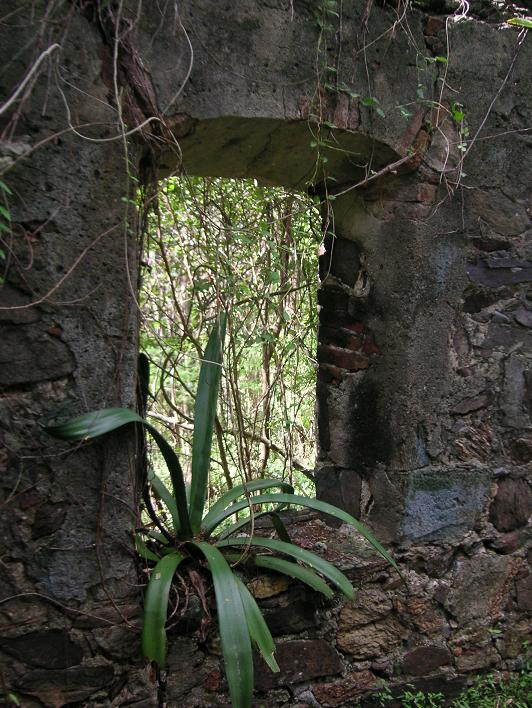
The ruin on Great Thatch

Great Thatch ruin is a ruin on Great Thatch island in the British Virgin Islands.

The ruin probably dates from the sugar plantation era, but may be earlier. It was presumed abandoned during the economic collapse of the British Virgin Islands during the mid-19th century, when many plantations were abandoned. The ruin covers a significant estate, and is an indicator of some wealth.

It is not clear when the ruin was finally fully abandoned, although bottles found on the site from the Portobello bottle company in Edinburgh, Scotland, suggest that it may have been as late as 1907. The cistern on the site does not exhibit the same level of deterioration as similar parts of ruins in the Territory which are known to have been abandoned during the 1850s.

== Images ==
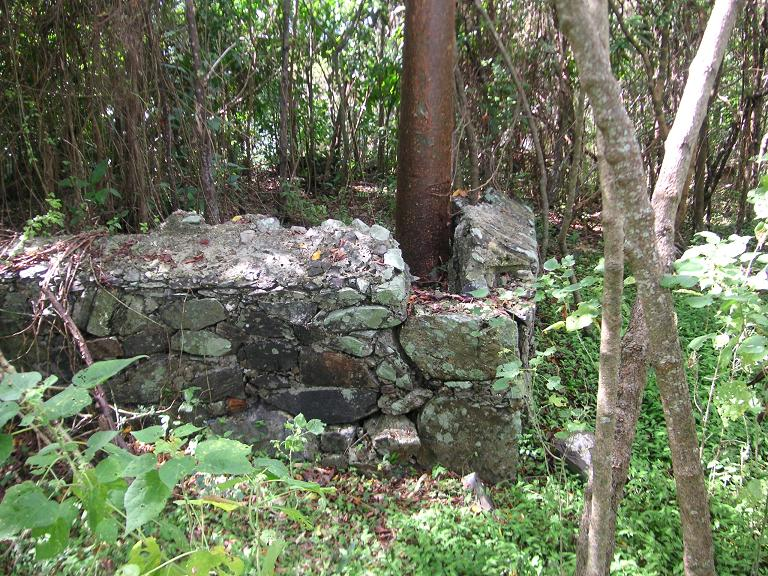

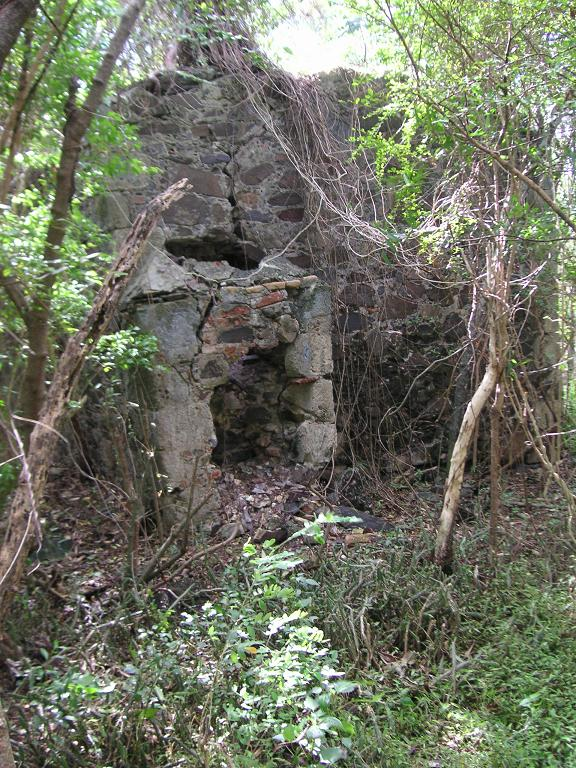

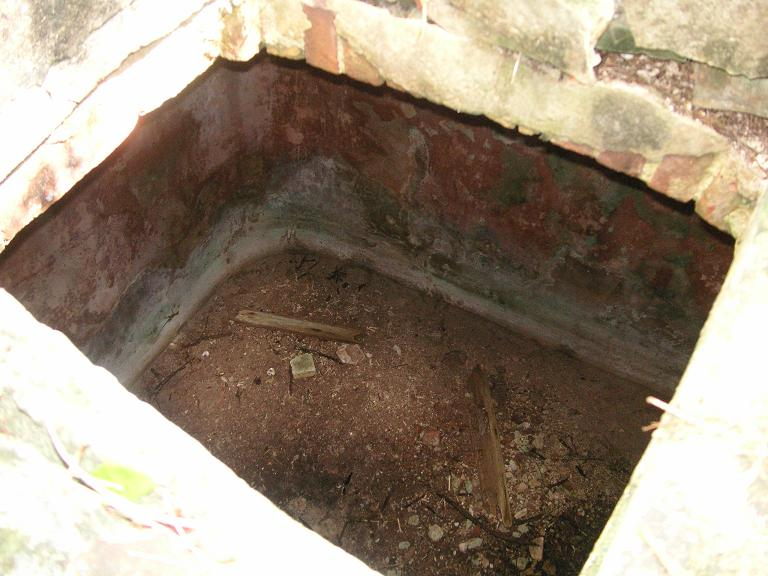

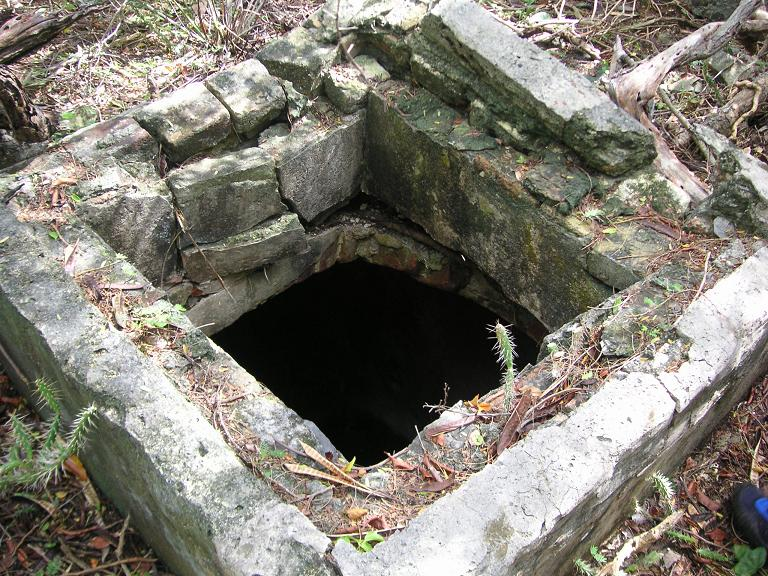

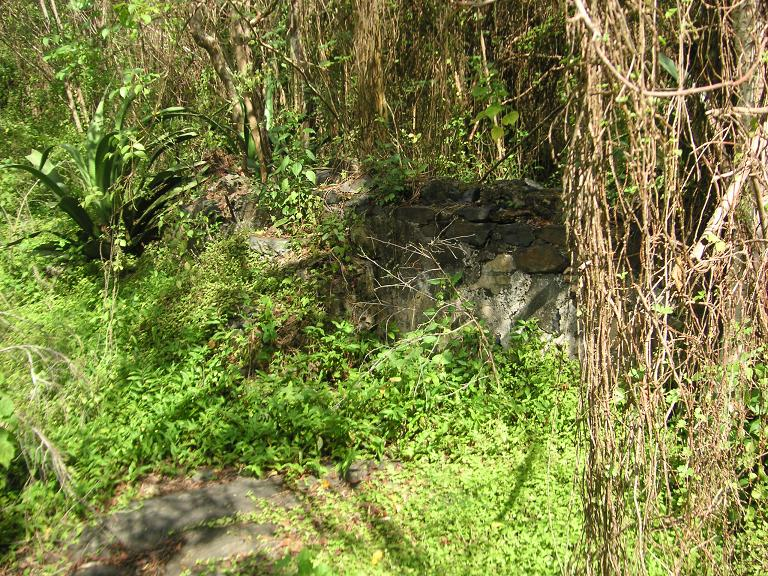

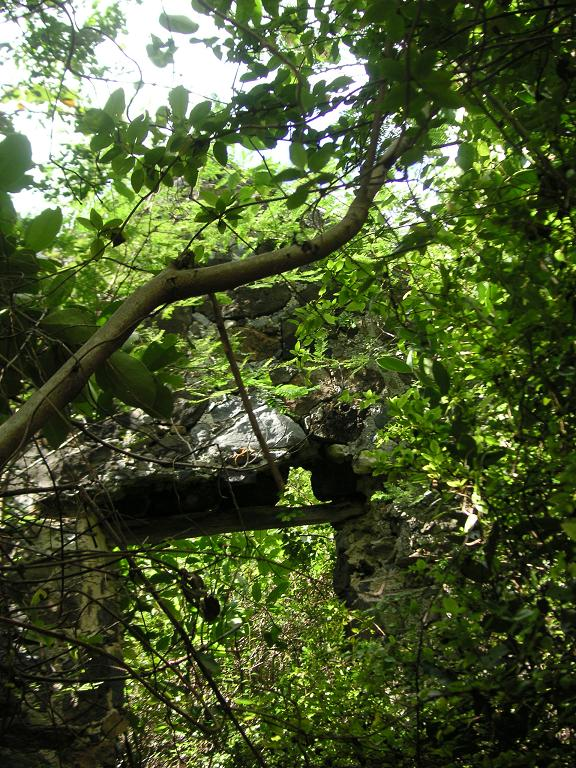
