= Noob (disambiguation) =

Noob is an alternative word for the slang newbie.

Noob may also refer to:

== People and characters ==
- Noob Noob, a fictional character, a member of The Vindicators from Rick and Morty
- Noob Saibot, a fictional character from Mortal Kombat videogame franchise
- “Noob”, a colloquial nickname for a default Roblox avatar from 2006

== Music ==
- "Noob" (1985 song), a song by Kommunity FK off the album Close One Sad Eye
- "Noob" (2017 song), a song by KSI off the EP Disstracktions; see KSI discography
- NOOB (album), a 2007 album by De/Vision; see De/Vision discography

== Stage and screen ==
- Noob, a streaming series, winner of the 2014 4th Streamy Awards
- N00b (TV series) (2024), New Zealand coming-of-age television series

== Other uses ==
- Star Wars Legacy 4: Noob (comics), a 2006 comic book

== See also ==
- Newb (disambiguation)
- Nube (disambiguation)
- NOB (disambiguation)
