= Knob =

Knob or KNOB may refer to:

== Objects ==
- A round handle
  - Doorknob
  - Control knob, controls a device
  - Brodie knob, on a steering wheel
- Tow ball or hitch ball
- Dorset knob, a biscuit

== Landforms ==
- A rounded hill or mountain, particularly in the Appalachians and the Ozarks
- The Knob (Indiana)
- The Knob (Montana), a mountain in Custer County, Montana
- The Knob (Greene County, New York)
- The Knob (Oneida County, New York)
- The Knob (South Georgia)
- "The Knob", a character in Squeeze Me (novel)
- The bottom end of the handle of a baseball bat, see Glossary of baseball terms#bat
- List of geographical knobs
- Knob, a synonym for kame, which is a mound left behind by a glacier
- Knobs region, a geographic region of Kentucky

== Radio stations ==
- KNOB (FM)
- KSFN, which held the call sign KNOB from 1995 to 1997
- KJPG, which held the call sign KNOB from 1988 to 1994
- KLAX-FM, which held the call sign KNOB from 1949 to 1988

== Other uses ==
- KNOB (duo), Israeli musical duo
- Protrusions on the surface of red blood cells in malaria

== See also ==
- Knobs into holes packing, in molecular biology
