= Patana Cave =

- Discovery: 1915

Patana Cave is located near Maisí in the Guantánamo Province of Cuba. This cave is known for its 9 stalagmite idols and abundant fauna. It has also been referred to as the Cave of Water or Deity's Cave. This case holds the Cuban record for a hot cave. This cave was found in 1915 by American archaeologist Mark Raymond Harrington.
