= Mole Hill (Virginia) =

Hill and Extinct volcano in Harrisonburg, Virginia

Coordinates: 38°26′55″N 78°57′12″W

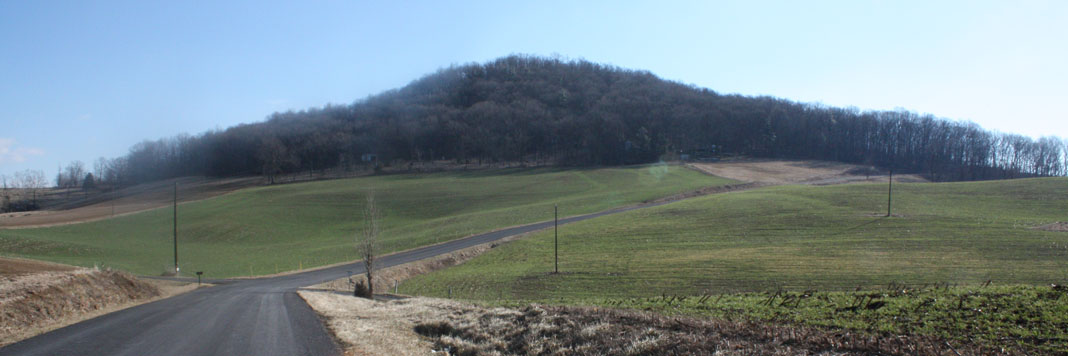
View facing east from Mole Hill Road

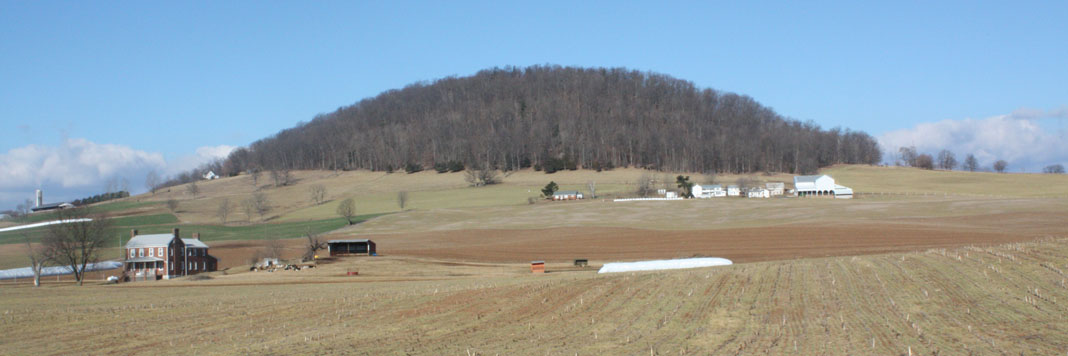
View facing northwest from Swope Road

Mole Hill is a rounded hill composed of basalt, a volcanic rock, formed during the Eocene epoch of the Paleogene period. It is the eroded remnant of what was an active volcano approximately 47 million years ago, making it one of the youngest volcanoes on the east coast of North America. It is located west of Harrisonburg, Virginia, in Rockingham County.

== Description ==
Mole Hill is an isolated, rounded, tree-covered monadnock in an otherwise relatively flat valley, surrounded by farmland. The peak of Mole Hill is approximately 1,893 feet (577 meters) above sea level.

== Geology ==
The basalt outcropping at the crest of the hill is "dark greenish gray to grayish black, medium grained, and moderately porphyritic. It is an olivine-spinel basalt with abundant large pale green pyroxene and minor yellow-brown olivine phenocrysts. There is also evidence for very small amounts of more evolved magma such as trachyandesite, trachydacite, and rhyolite." The basalt intrudes through the Ordovician Beekmantown Group of carbonate rocks.

Mole Hill is part of a larger eruptive period during the Eocene, which happened between 48 and 35 million years ago in Virginia and West Virginia . Geologists have struggled to understand the cause of these eruptions. They were small volume, episodic eruptions that happened far from any plate boundary.

While many different processes have been researched, such as a mantle plume, or edge-driven convection, the leading theory into what caused the eruption of Mole Hill, (and other Eocene volcanoes) is thought to be a result of a large scale change in plate motion between 53.5 and 37.5 million years ago. This caused crutal extension to occur in the Valley and Ridge province of West Virginia and Virginia as the North American Plate adjusted.

Small volumes of magma were produced in a process called decompression melting. This allowed magma to rise through old suture zones created as Pangea was formed and then later rifted apart 200 million years ago. Small pulses of magma reached the surface between 48 and 35 million years ago. Mole Hill was the result of one of the initial pulses of magma around 48 million years ago.

== Age ==
The basalt at Mole Hill (and other igneous dikes in the area) was originally thought to be of Paleozoic age by relative age dating using cross-cutting relationships. In 1969, Fullagar and Bottino used K-Ar and Rb-Sr radiometric dating techniques to date rocks that they thought were temporally related to the Devonian Tioga Bentonite, but discovered that the rocks were actually a much younger age of approximately 47 million years, placing them in the Eocene.

Trimble Knob, located in Highland County, is geologically similar to Mole Hill and thought to be contemporaneous with it, along with other intrusive igneous rocks near Ugly Mountain in Pendleton County, West Virginia.
