= Iron Eyes Cody =

American actor (1904–1999)

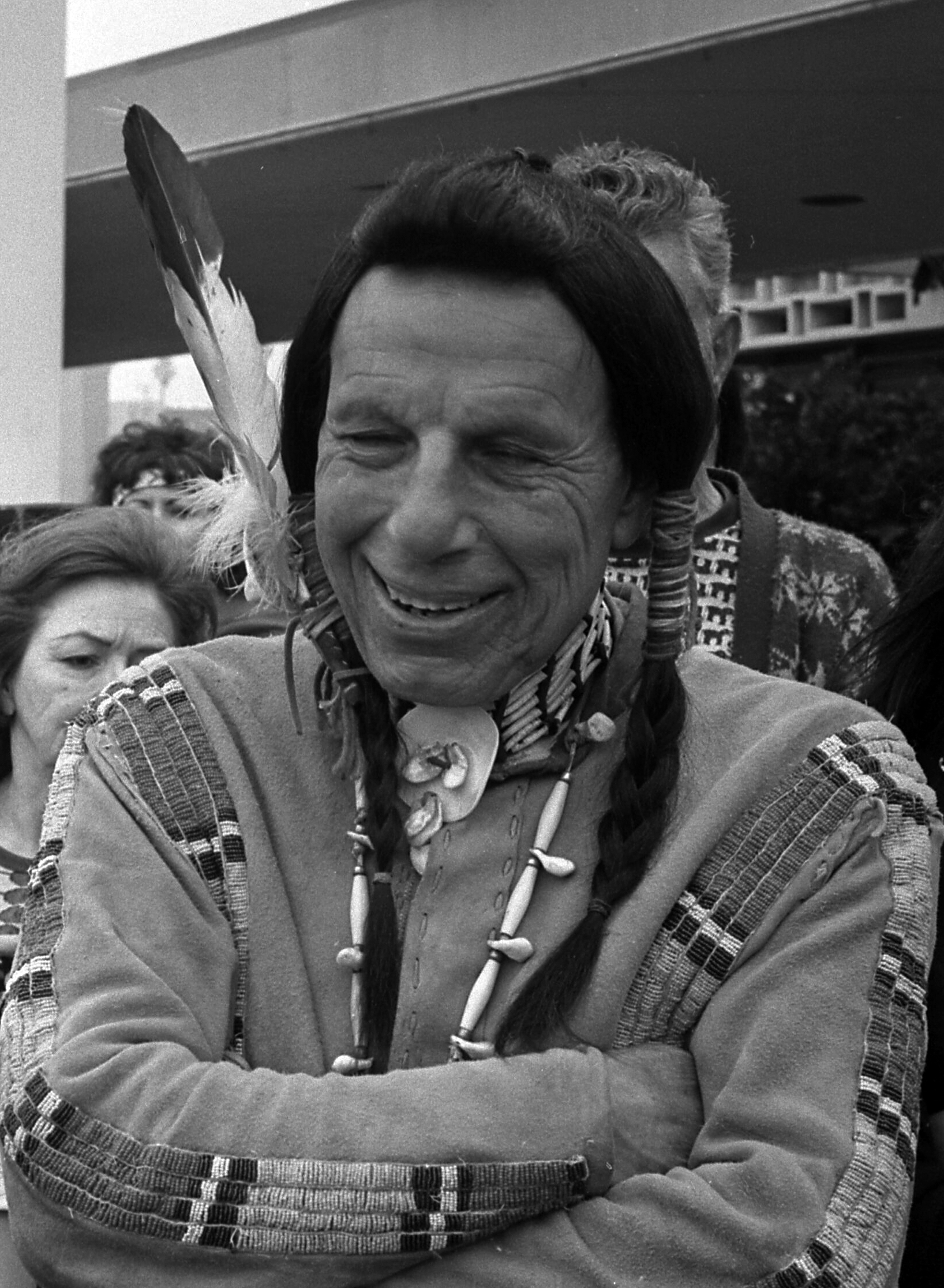
- Cody in 1977
- Born: Espera Oscar de Corti; April 3, 1904; Kaplan, Louisiana, U.S
- Died: January 4, 1999 (aged 94); Los Angeles, California, U.S
- Resting place: Hollywood Forever Cemetery
- Other name: The Crying Indian
- Years active: 1927–1990
- Spouses: Bertha Parker (m. 1936; died 1978) Wendy Foote (m. 1992; div. 1993)
- Children: 2, including Robert Tree Cody

External images
- President Carter with Iron Eyes Cody
- Jimmy Carter with "Iron Eyes" Cody, Cherokee Indian

Iron Eyes Cody (born Espera Oscar de Corti, April 3, 1904 – January 4, 1999) was an American actor who portrayed Native Americans in Hollywood films, including the role of Chief Iron Eyes in Bob Hope's The Paleface (1948). He also played a Native American shedding a tear about pollution in one of the country's most well-known television public service announcements from the group Keep America Beautiful. Living in Hollywood, he began to insist, even in his private life, that he was Native American, over time claiming membership in several different tribes. In 1996, Cody's half-sister said that he was of Italian ancestry, but he denied it. After his death, it was revealed that he was of Sicilian parentage and not Native American at all.

== Early life ==
Cody was born Espera Oscar de Corti on April 3, 1904, in Kaplan in Vermilion Parish, in southwestern Louisiana, a second son of Francesca Salpietra from Sicily and her husband, Antonio de Corti from southern Italy. He had two brothers, Joseph and Frank, and a sister, Victoria. His parents had a local grocery store in Gueydan, Louisiana, where he grew up. His father left the family and moved to Texas, where he took the name Tony Corti. His mother married Alton Abshire and had five more children with him.

When the three de Corti brothers were teenagers, they joined their father in Texas and shortened their last name from de Corti to Corti. Cody's father, Tony Corti, died in Texas in 1924. The brothers moved on to California, where they were acting in movies, and changed their surname to Cody. Joseph William and Frank Henry Cody worked as extras, then moved on to other work. Frank was killed by a hit-and-run driver in 1949.

== Career ==
Cody began acting in the late 1920s. He worked in film and television until his death. Cody claimed his father was Cherokee and his mother Cree, also naming several different tribes, and frequently changing his claimed place of birth. To those unfamiliar with Indigenous American or First Nations cultures and people, he gave the appearance of living as if he were Native American, fulfilling the stereotypical expectations by wearing his film wardrobe as daily clothing—including braided wig, fringed leathers and beaded moccasins—at least when photographers were visiting, and in other ways continuing to play the same Hollywood-scripted roles off-screen as well as on.

He appeared in more than 200 films, including The Big Trail (1930), with John Wayne; The Scarlet Letter (1934), with Colleen Moore; Sitting Bull (1954), as Crazy Horse; The Light in the Forest (1958) as Cuyloga; The Great Sioux Massacre (1965), with Joseph Cotten; Nevada Smith (1966), with Steve McQueen; A Man Called Horse (1970), with Richard Harris; and Ernest Goes to Camp (1987) as Chief St. Cloud, with Jim Varney.

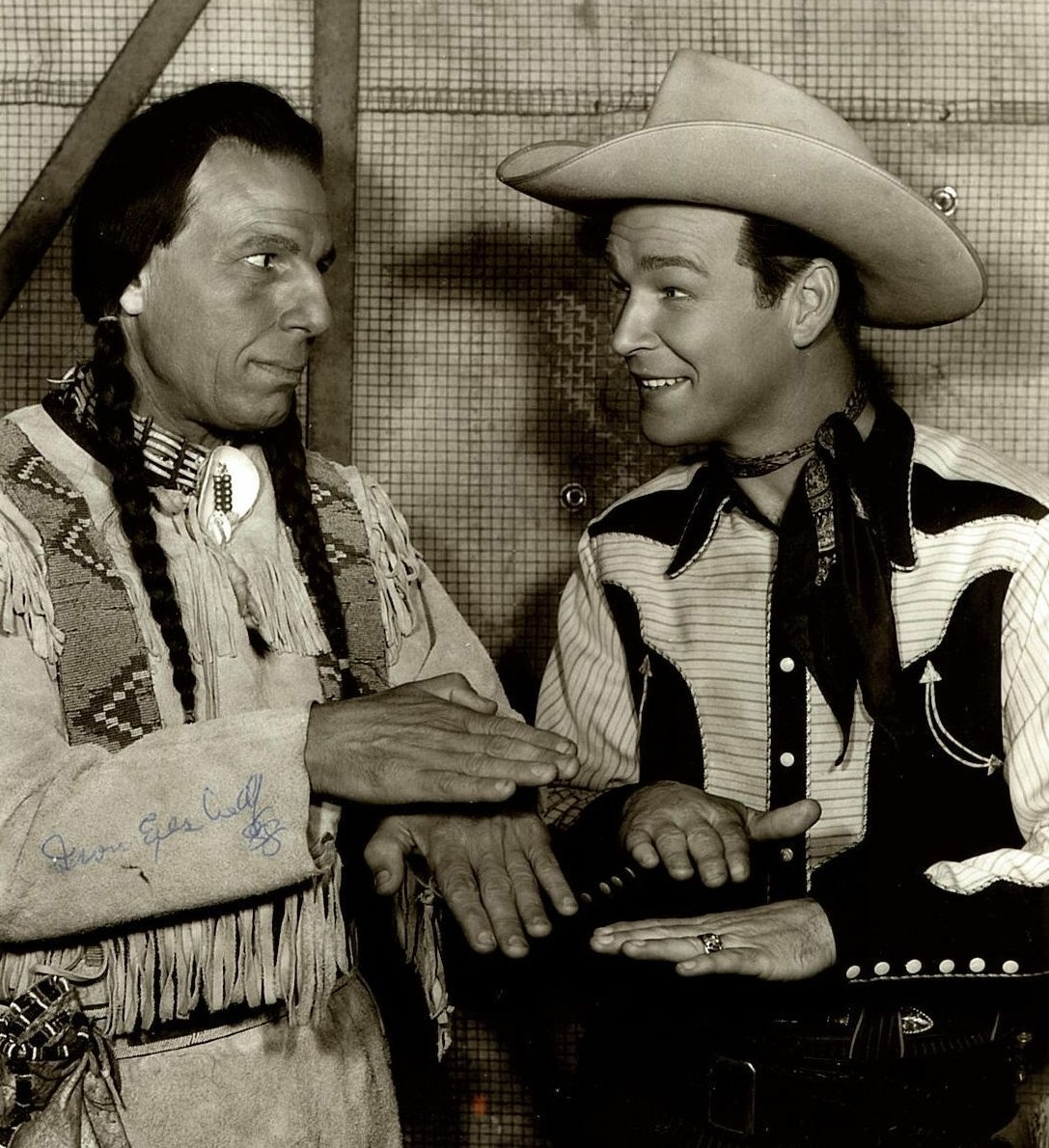
Iron Eyes Cody and Roy Rogers in North of the Great Divide, 1950

He also appeared in over a hundred television programs. In 1953, he appeared twice in Duncan Renaldo's syndicated television series, The Cisco Kid as Chief Sky Eagle. He guest starred on the NBC western series, The Restless Gun, starring John Payne, and The Tall Man, with Barry Sullivan and Clu Gulager. In 1961, he played the title role in "The Burying of Sammy Hart" on the ABC western series, The Rebel, starring Nick Adams. A close friend of Walt Disney, Cody appeared in a Disney studio serial titled The First Americans, and in episodes of The Mountain Man, Davy Crockett and Daniel Boone. In 1964 Cody appeared as Chief Black Feather on The Virginian episode "The Intruders". He played Seeba in S8 E26 "The Jarbo Pierce Story" on Wagon Train, 1965.

Cody was widely seen as the "Crying Indian" in the "Keep America Beautiful" public service announcements (PSA) in the early 1970s. The environmental commercial, first aired on Earth Day in 1971, depicted Cody in a Plains Indians/Hollywood Indian-style costume, shedding a tear after trash is thrown from the window of a car and it lands at his feet. The announcer, William Conrad, says: "People start pollution; people can stop it." The ad won two Clio awards, is believed to have led to increased community involvement, and may have "helped reduce litter by 88% across 38 states", according to one source. Cody was a participant in the documentary series Hollywood (1980), where he discussed early Western filmmaker William S. Hart's use of Plains Indian Sign Language.

The Joni Mitchell song "Lakota", from the 1988 album, Chalk Mark in a Rainstorm, features Cody's chanting. He made a cameo appearance in the 1990 film The Spirit of '76.

== Personal life and death ==
In 1936, Cody married archaeologist Bertha Parker (Abenaki and Seneca descent). She was active in excavations during the late 1920s and early 1930s before becoming an assistant in archaeology at the Southwest Museum. They adopted two children said to be of Dakota-Maricopa origin, Robert Tree Cody and Arthur. The couple remained married until Bertha's death in 1978.

Although the non-Native public who knew him from the movies and television thought of Cody as a Native American, a 1996 story by The Times-Picayune in New Orleans questioned his heritage, reporting that he was a second-generation Italian-American. This was based on an interview with his half-sister, and documents including a baptismal record. Cody, who now wore his Hollywood costumes in daily life, denied the claim.

Cody died at the age of 94 from mesothelioma at home in Los Angeles on January 4, 1999. Before death, he had written this comment: "Make me ready to stand before you with clean and straight eyes. When life fades, as the fading sunset, may our spirits stand before you without shame."

== Honors ==
On April 20, 1983, he was inducted to the Hollywood Walk of Fame at 6601 Hollywood Boulevard.

In 1999, a Golden Palm Star on the Palm Springs, California, Walk of Stars was dedicated to him.

== Partial filmography ==
Film roles
Year	Film	Role	Notes
1927	Back to God's Country	Indian	Uncredited role
1928	The Viking	Indian	Uncredited role
1930	The Big Trail	Indian	Uncredited role
1931	Fighting Caravans	Indian After Firewater	Uncredited role
1931	Oklahoma Jim	War Eagle	Uncredited role
1931	The Rainbow Trail	John Tom	Uncredited role
1932	Texas Pioneers	Little Eagle	
1942	Ride 'Em Cowboy	Indian	Uncredited role
1947	The Senator Was Indiscreet	Indian	
1947	Unconquered	Red Corn	
1947	Bowery Buckaroos	Indian Joe	
1948	Blood on the Moon	Indian	Uncredited role
1948	The Paleface	Chief Iron Eyes	
1948	Indian Agent	Wovoka	
1948	Train to Alcatraz	Geronimo	
1949	Massacre River	Chief Yellowstone	
1950	Broken Arrow	Teese	Uncredited role
1951	Ace in the Hole	Indian Copy Boy	Uncredited role
1952	Lost in Alaska	Canook	Uncredited role
1952	Montana Belle	Indian on horseback	Uncredited role
1954	Sitting Bull	Crazy Horse	Credited as the "Famous T.V. Star" and technical advisor Iron Eyes Cody
1955	White Feather	Indian Chief	
1958	Gun Fever	1st Indian Chief	
1965	The Great Sioux Massacre	Crazy Horse	
1966	Nevada Smith	Taka-Ta	Uncredited role
1970	El Condor	Santana, Apache Chief	
1970	Cockeyed Cowboys of Calico County	Crazy Foot	
1970	A Man Called Horse	Medicine Man #1	
1977	Grayeagle	Standing Bear	
1987	Ernest Goes to Camp	Old Indian 'Chief St. Cloud'	
1990	The Spirit of '76	Himself	Cameo, final film role

Television roles
Year	Title	Role	Notes
1953	The Cisco Kid	Chief Big Cloud / Chief Sky Eagle	Two separate roles, in "Indian Uprising" (1953) as Chief Sky Eagle and "The Gramophone" (1953) as Chief Big Cloud
1955	Cavalcade of America	n/a	Episode, "The Hostage" (1955)
1957	Cheyenne	Grey Wolf	Episode: "Hard Bargain" Season 2, Episode 19
1958	The Restless Gun	George Washington Smith	Episode "A Pressing Engagement"
1959	Rawhide	John Redcloud	Episode: "Incident of the Thirteenth Man" (1959)
1959	Rawhide	Blue Deer	Episode: "Incident of the Tinker's Dam" (1959)
1959	The Lucy-Desi Comedy Hour	Eskimo Pilot	Episode: "Lucy Goes to Alaska" (1959)
1959	Mackenzie's Raiders	n/a	Episode: "Death Patrol" (1959)
1961	The Rebel	Sammy Hart	"The Death of Sammy Hart" (1961) Season 2, Episode 25
1961	Dick Powell's Zane Grey Theatre	Nemanna	Episode: "Blood Red"
1962	Mister Ed	Chief Thundercloud	Episode: "Ed the Pilgrim" (1962) Season 3, Episode 9
1964	The Virginian	Chief Black Feather	Episode: "The Intruders" (1964) Season 2, Episode 23
1967	The Fastest Guitar Alive	1st Indian	
1969	Then Came Bronson	Chief John Carbona	Episode: "Old Tigers Never Die—They Just Run Away" (1969)
1982	Fantasy Island	Nancy's father	Season 5, Episode 21: "Nancy and The Thunderbirds" (1982)
1983	Newhart	Hotel Guest	Episode: "Don't Rain on My Parade" (1983)
1986	The A-Team	Chief Watashi	Episode: "Mission of Peace" (1986)

== Bibliography ==
- Cody, Iron Eyes (1991) [1970]. Indian Talk: Hand Signals of the American Indians. Illustrator: Ken Mansker (First (hardcover) ed.). Healdsburg, California: Naturegraph Publishers. ISBN 0-911010-82-3. OCLC 112881.

== See also ==
- Chief Thundercloud
- Grey Owl
- Jamake Highwater
- Indigenous identity fraud in Canada and the United States
- Rachel Dolezal
- Red Thunder Cloud
- Reel Injun
- Sacheen Littlefeather
- Buffy Sainte-Marie
