= Newb (disambiguation) =

Newb is short for newbie.

Newb or Newbs may also refer to:

== People and characters ==
- John Strong Newberry (1822–1892), U.S. naturalist with the botanical author abbreviation "Newb."
- Jon Newby (born 1978), UK soccer player, nicknamed "Newbs"

== Other uses ==
- Newman University, Birmingham (NEWB); see List of UCAS institutions

== See also ==
- Newbie (disambiguation)
- Newby (disambiguation)
- Nube (disambiguation)
- Noob (disambiguation)
