= Newby =

Newby (from Old Norse Nýbýr lit. 'new farmstead') may refer to:

== Places ==
=== England ===
==== Cumbria ====
- Newby, Cumbria, near Penrith
- Newby Bridge, in Furness

==== Lancashire ====
- Newby, Lancashire, historically in the West Riding of Yorkshire

==== North Yorkshire ====
- Newby, Craven
- Newby, Hambleton, near Stokesley
- Newby Wiske, Hambleton
- Newby, Huby, Harrogate
- Newby, Skelton-on-Ure, Harrogate District
  - Newby Hall, an 18th-century country house
- Newby-on-Swale, Harrogate District, a deserted medieval village
  - Newby Park
- Newby, Scarborough
  - Newby and Scalby, Scarborough
- Newby Head, a former inn, now a farm, near Ribblehead in Craven

== People ==
- Basil Newby (born 1951), British entrepreneur and businessman
- Brendan Newby (born 1996), Irish-American freestyle skier
- Chas Newby (1941–2023), English musician, temporarily bassist for The Beatles
- Chris Newby (born 1957), British film director and screenwriter
- Craig Newby (born 1979), New Zealand rugby player
- Dangerfield Newby (1815–1859), American abolitionist
- Edward W. B. Newby (1804–1870), American soldier
- Eric Newby (1919–2006), English author
- Eric Newby (wheelchair rugby) (born 1988), American wheelchair rugby player
- Frank Newby (1926–2001), eminent structural engineer
- Sir Howard Newby (1947–2010), British sociologist
- Joey Newby (born 1982), American professional baseball player
- Jon Newby (born 1978), British football (soccer) player
- Jonathon Newby, American singer
- Kenneth Newby (born 1956), Canadian composer, performer and media artist
- Marie du Sautoy Newby (1880–1962), English suffragette
- Oliver Newby (born 1984), English cricketer
- Paul Martin Newby (born 1955), American judge
- Paula Newby-Fraser (born 1962), African athlete
- P. H. Newby (1918–1997), English novelist, winner of the first Booker Prize
- Richard Newby, Baron Newby (born 1953), British politician
- Sabra Newby, American politician
- Thomas Cautley Newby (1798–1882), London publisher and printer
- Tim Newby (born 1974) American writer.
- William Newby (Cambridgeshire cricketer) (1836–1932), English cricketer
- William Newby (South African cricketer) (1855–1921), South African cricketer

== See also ==
- Newb (disambiguation)
- Newbie (disambiguation)
- Newbee
