= NOB =

NOB may refer to:

- National Orchestra of Belgium
- Newell's Old Boys, a professional football club in Rosario, Argentina
- Nederlandse Onderwatersport Bond (Dutch Underwater Federation), the Netherlands skin-diving association
- Estrada de Ferro Nor Oeste do Brasil, former railway company in Brazil (see Rail transport in Brazil)
- Nord-Ostsee-Bahn, a German railway company
- NOB, IATA code for Nosara Airport in Costa Rica
- Schweizerische Nord Ost Bahn (Swiss Northeastern Railway( (1853–1902), a former Swiss railway company
- Narodno oslobodilačka borba or narodnoosvobodilni boj ("National Liberation Struggle"), name for World War II in Yugoslavia
- Nitrite-oxidizing bacteria, alternate term for nitrifying bacteria
- Name on Back of team jerseys, see Name (sports)

== See also ==
- Nob (disambiguation)
- Knob (disambiguation)
