= Robert Tree Cody =

American musician (1951–2023)

Robert Cody
- Born: Robert Cody; April 20, 1951; Los Angeles, California, U.S.
- Died: September 14, 2023 (aged 72)
- Height: 6 ft 11 in (211 cm)

Robert Tree Cody (April 20, 1951 – September 14, 2023) was an American musician, dancer, and educator. He graduated from John Marshall High School in 1969. Robert was an adopted son of Hollywood actor Iron Eyes Cody.

== Personal life ==
Robert Tree Cody was the adopted son of the actor Iron Eyes Cody and Cody's wife Bertha Parker, an Assistant in Archaeology at Southwest Museum of the American Indian. Iron Eyes and Bertha adopted Robert and his brother Arthur, who served in the United States Marine Corps during the Vietnam War and died as a result of exposure to Agent Orange. The brothers were of Dakota and Maricopa heritage. Robert was an enrolled member of the Salt River Pima-Maricopa Indian Community. In the Maricopa language, his traditional name was Oou Kas Mah Quet, meaning "Thunder Bear".

Formerly of Big Bear, California, he resided in Santa Ana Pueblo, New Mexico with his wife, Rachel. His nickname, "Tree", came from his height: he was six feet nine and a half inches tall. In 2009, Robert was interviewed about his father in the Canadian documentary Reel Injun.

Cody died on September 14, 2023, at the age of 72.

== Performer and musician ==
Robert Cody played the Native American flute, had released eleven albums with Canyon Records, and toured throughout the Americas, Europe and East Asia. He performed the traditional carved wooden flute on several tracks of The Rippingtons' 1999 album Topaz.

Cody was a featured flautist in the tenth episode of the PBS series Reading Rainbow, entitled "The Gift of the Sacred Dog" (based on the book by Paul Goble). It was filmed at Montana's Crow Agency reservation on June 17, 1983. He performed with Xavier Quijas Yxayotl (Huichol) from Guadalajara for the 2000 new age album Crossroads. He also was on the 5th and 6th season of Longmire. In episode 5, he was one of the singers in the sweat lodge scene.

During the 1950s and '60s and '70s, Cody travelled the pow-wow circuit extensively as a dancer.

In November 2022, Robert Tree Cody was honoured with a Lifetime Achievement Award at the Native American Music Awards. Due to failing health, he was unable to attend.

Cody was previously a multiple award winner of the Native American Music Awards for his albums Native Flamenco, featuring Tony Redhouse and Ruben Romero; Maze, released in 2002; Crossroads, with Xavier Quijas Yxayotl; as well as for a collaboration with Taste of Honey's Janice Marie Johnson on her recording Until the Eagle Falls. He was also nominated for a Grammy at the 49th Annual Grammy Awards for Best Native American Music Album for Heart of the Wind featuring Will Clipman.
