= Nob =

Nob may refer to:

== People ==
- NoB (1964-2025), Japanese singer Nobuo Yamada
- Nob Yoshigahara (1936–2004), Japanese puzzle-maker

== Places ==
- Nob, Israel, a place in the vicinity of Jerusalem
- Nob Hill, San Francisco, a neighborhood in the California city

== Other uses ==
- Nederlandse Onderwatersport Bond, the Dutch Underwater Federation
- Newell's Old Boys, Argentine football team
- Non-occluded baculovirus, a genus of virus
- "One for his nob", a score in cribbage
- A person of social standing (cf. nobility/nabob)
- Derogatory term for a man's penis, typically used as an insult in the UK and Ireland

== See also ==
- Knob (disambiguation)
- NOB (disambiguation)
