= Bertha Parker Pallan =

American archaeologist

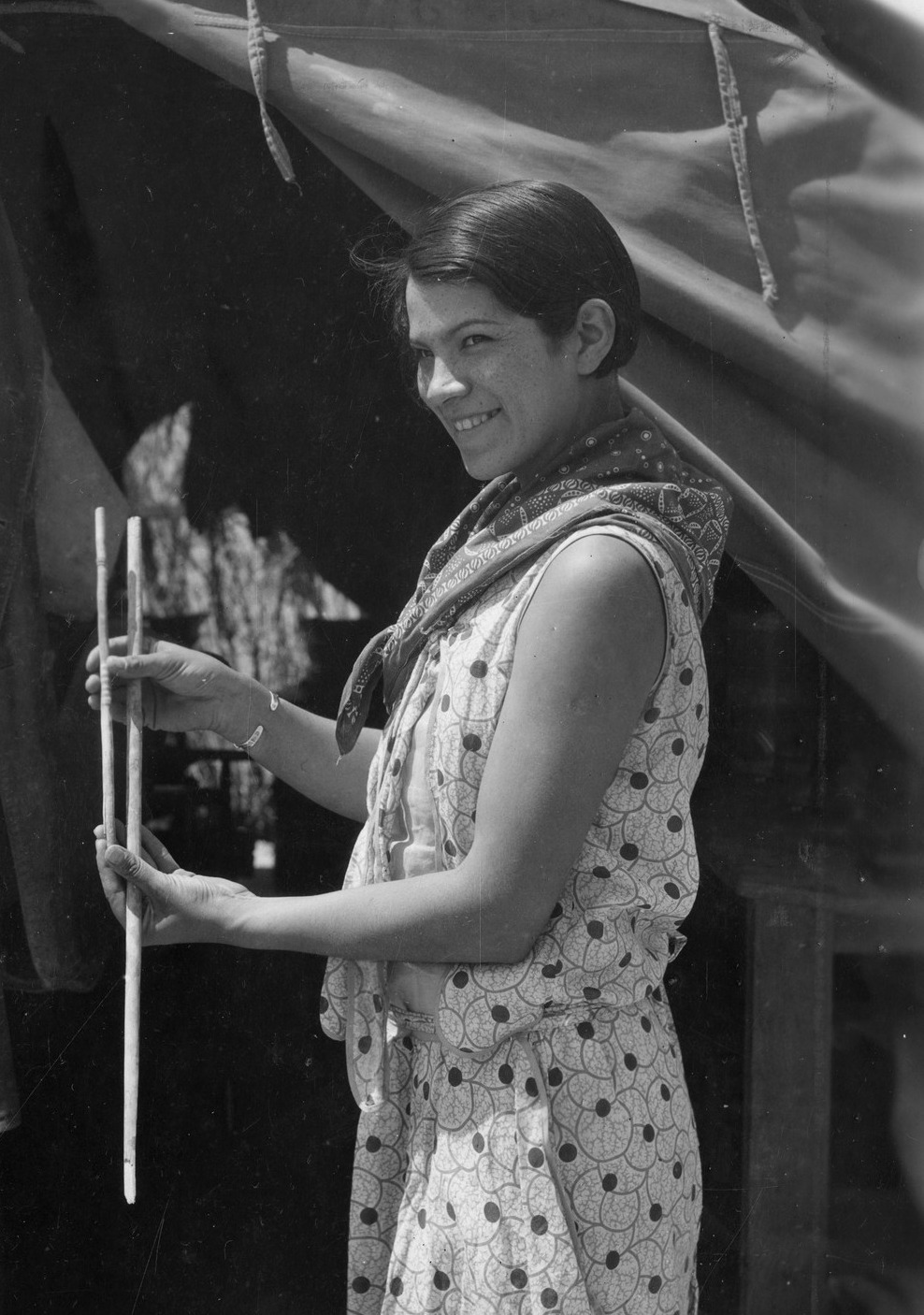
- Pallan, holding atlatl darts during Southwest Museum, Los Angeles, Gypsum Cave expedition, circa 1930.
- Born: Bertha Parker; August 30, 1907; Chautauqua County, New York, United States
- Died: October 8, 1978 (aged 71); Los Angeles, California, United States
- Spouse(s): Joseph Pallan (m. 192?; div. 1929/30) James Thurston (m. 1931; died 1932) Iron Eyes Cody (m. 1936)
- Children: 3, including Robert Tree Cody
- Scientific career
- Fields: Archaeology, ethnology
- Workplaces: Southwest Museum

Bertha Pallan Thurston Cody (née Parker; August 30, 1907 – October 8, 1978) was an American archaeologist, working as an assistant in archaeology at the Southwest Museum. She was also married to actor Iron Eyes Cody. She is thought to be the first Native American archaeologist of Abenaki and Seneca descent.

== Early life ==
Bertha (Yeawas) "Birdie" Parker was born in 1907 in Chautauqua County, New York. Her mother, Beulah Tahamont (later Folsom), was an actress; as a teen, she and her mother reportedly performed with Ringling Bros. and Barnum and Bailey Circus as part of the “Pocahontas” show. Her father, Arthur C. Parker, was an archaeologist and the first president of the Society for American Archaeology. Her maternal grandparents were the actors Elijah "Chief Dark Cloud" Tahamont and Margaret (Dove Eye) Camp. As a child, she assisted her father in his excavations.

Her parents divorced in 1914, and the Tahamonts (Elijah, Margaret, and Beulah) relocated to Los Angeles, with Bertha in tow, to work in Hollywood.

== Family ==
Bertha married Joseph Pallan in the early 1920s and had a daughter. When the marriage ended, she moved to Nevada to work on an archaeological site for the Southwest Museum, directed by Mark Raymond Harrington. Harrington had recently married Bertha's aunt, Endeka Parker. During the Gypsum Cave expedition, Bertha met, in 1930, and later married, in 1931, the paleontologist, James Thurston after the expedition. In 1931, both became ill during their work at the Gypsum Caves; Bertha became ill due to the large amounts of cave guano and Thurston died suddenly from a heart attack while lifting a rock on site. This illness caused Bertha to move back in with her parents for a time in Los Angeles.

She was hired, first as a secretary, and then as an assistant archaeologist and ethnologist, for the Southwest Museum. In 1936, she married the actor Espera Oscar de Corti, also known as Iron Eyes Cody.

In 1942, her 17-year-old daughter Billie was visiting her grandmother Beulah's farm when she died of an accidental gunshot wound. Bertha and Iron Eyes later adopted two sons, Robert "Tree" Cody and Arthur William Cody (1952–1996). Bertha and Iron Eyes were central figures in the success of the Los Angeles Indian Center, a gathering place for urban Indians relocated to Los Angeles.

== Archaeological career ==
Mark Raymond Harrington, her uncle, hired Parker as a camp cook and expedition secretary. shortly after marrying her aunt Endeka. She participated in excavations at the site of Mesa House and other locales, and Harrington taught her archaeological methods in the field. In 1929, she discovered and did a solo excavation at the pueblo site of Scorpion Hill; the finds were exhibited in the Southwest Museum.

Bertha worked at Gypsum Cave in 1930, a site that Harrington promoted as having the earliest evidence for human occupation of North America during the Pleistocene.

As the expedition secretary, Bertha worked at cleaning, repairing, and cataloguing finds; in addition, she explored the rooms of the cave in her spare time and was able to reach into some of the most inaccessible crevices. On one of these occasions she discovered the skull of a species of extinct giant ground sloth, Nothrotherium shastense Sinclair, alongside ancient human tools, in Room 3. Harrington noted that the find was the most important one of the expedition, because it drew the support of additional institutions, notably the California Institute of Technology and later the Carnegie Institution of Washington.

While on this expedition, Bertha also discovered the site of Corn Creek after seeing fossil camel bone protruding from an eroding lake bed.

From 1931 to 1941, Bertha worked as an Assistant in Archaeology and Ethnology at the Southwest Museum. She published a number of archaeological and ethnological papers in the museum journal, Masterkey, from the early 1930s through the 1960s. These included papers such as "California Indian Baby Cradles", "Kachina Dolls" and several articles on the Yurok Tribe, including "Some Yurok Customs and Beliefs".

Bertha Parker Pallan Thurston Cody is notable in the field of archaeology for her role as a ground-breaker: she was one of the first (if not the first) Native American female archaeologists. She was certainly first in her ability to conduct this work at a high level of skill, yet without a university education, making discoveries and gaining insights that impressed the trained archaeologists around her.

== Death ==
Bertha Parker Pallan died in 1978, aged 71. Her gravestone simply reads "Mrs. Iron Eyes Cody".

== Publications ==
The following are listed as they appear in a list compiled by Marge Bruchac.

Masterkey is Southwest Museum’s journal.

Published under the name of Bertha Parker Thurston:

- 1933. "Scorpion Hill." Masterkey. v. VII, pp. 171–177.
- 1933. "A night in a Maidu shaman's house." Masterkey.v.VII, pp. 111–115.
- 1934. "How he became a medicine-man." Masterkey. v. VIII, pp. 79–81.
- 1935. "How a Maidu-medicine man lost his power; related to Bertha Parker Thurston by a Maidu Indian herbalist." Masterkey. v. IX, p. 28–29.
- 1936. "A rare treat at a Maidu medicine-man's feast." Masterkey. v. X, pp. 16–21.

Published under the name of Bertha Parker Cody:

- 1939. "A tale of witchcraft as told by a Tewa Indian of New Mexico." Masterkey. v. XIII, pp. 188–189.
- 1939. "A Maidu myth of the first death; by Bertha Parker Cody, as related by Mandy Wilson of Chico, California." Masterkey. v. XIII, p. 144.
- 1939. "A Maidu myth of the creation of Indian women; by Bertha Parker Cody, as related by Mandy Wilson, Maidu Indian of Chico, California. Masterkey. v. XIII, p. 83.
- 1939. "Kachina dolls." Masterkey. v. XIII, pp. 25–30.
- 1940. "Pomo bear impersonators." Masterkey. 1940. v. XIV, pp. 132–137.
- 1940. "California Indian baby cradles." Masterkey. v. XIV, pp. 89–96. (Southwest Museum Leaflets, No. 12)
- 1940. Photograph: "Amanda Wilson and granddaughter" (Southwest Museum MSS 160:143:58)
- 1941. "A note on basket care." Masterkey. v. XV, pp. 23–24.
- 1941. "Gold ornaments of Ecuador." Masterkey.v. XV, pp. 87–95.
- 1942. "Simply strung on a single strand." Masterkey. v. XVI, pp. 175–176.
- 1942. "Some Yurok customs and beliefs." Masterkey. v. XVII, pp. 81–87.
- 1943. "Some Yurok customs and beliefs." Masterkey. v. XVI, pp. 157–162.
- 1955. "Enrique" crosses the divide." [Obituary]. Masterkey. vol.XXX, p. 102.
- 1961. "Clarence Arthur Ellsworth [1885-1961]; gifted painter of Indians."Masterkey. vol. XXXV, (no. 1), pp. 75–77.

Published under the name of her Yurok interviewee, Jane Van Stralen:

- 1941. "Yurok tales, as told by Jane Van Stralen to Bertha Parker Cody." Masterkey. v. XV, pp. 228–231.
- 1942. "Yurok fish-dam dance; as told by Jane Van Stralen to Bertha Parker Cody." Masterkey. v. XVI, pp. 81–86.
