= Gypsum Cave (Nevada) =

Cave in Clark County, Nevada, US

- U.S. National Register of Historic Places
- Nevada Historical Marker
- Location within Nevada Location within the United States
- Coordinates: 36.222°N 114.900°W
- NRHP reference No.: 10000443
- Marker No.: 103
- Added to NRHP: July 8, 2010

Gypsum Cave is a limestone cave in eastern Clark County, Nevada, United States, about 15 miles (24 km) east of Las Vegas, that is listed on the National Register of Historic Places (NRHP).

== Description ==
The cave contains six rooms and is measured at 320 feet (98 m) long by 120 feet (37 m) wide. The cave was first documented by Mark Raymond Harrington in a 1930 edition of Scientific American. Up until about 11,000 BC (11,000 radiocarbon years ago), Gypsum Cave was inhabited by the Shasta ground sloth.

A few hundreds feet away, the Gypsum Cave Mine contains gypsum, anhydrite and uranium.

== History ==
Human habitation of the cave dates to around 3000 BC. Harrington provided the first documentation of the contents of the cave following excavation in 1930-1931. Habitation occurred at the same time at other local sites like Tule Springs, Lake Mojave and the Pinto Basin.

The skull of the ground sloth Nothrotheriops shastensis Sinclair was found in Room 3 by the archaeologist Bertha Parker, who was Harrington's niece and served as expedition secretary. Excavators also found the dung, backbone, claws and reddish-brown hair of the now-extinct ground sloth (these and other bones from the cave are held by the Natural History Museum of Los Angeles County). Through radiocarbon dating, it was found that the sloth remains date back to 11,000 BC and earlier. The dung has given information about what the environment and vegetation of the area was because the sloth was a herbivore. This ancient plant eater survived on capers, mustards, grasses, agave, yucca, phacelia, borages, mints, grape, globemallow, saltbushes and ephedra. Most of these are still found in the area today, but the agave, yucca and grapes are only found at elevations 800 m and more higher, and close to water in the case of grapes. However, during the ice age, the climate was cooler and wetter. The geology of the area shows that the closest likely water supply was between 6–12 miles (9.7–19.3 km) away.

In 1994, a sign, the Nevada State Historical Marker #103, was put up to indicate to tourists the way to the site. It was removed by the private owner of the Gypsum Cave, PABCO Mining Company, to avoid unwanted tourism on its grounds. In the early 2000s, the Bureau of Land Management launched a survey for the construction of the proposed Harry Allen-Mead 500kV Transmission Line Project. Native tribes identified only 2 sites out of 56 that were highly significant to their culture, one of which was Gypsum Cave.

The cave was listed on the NRHP on July 8, 2010.

In 2017, a team of scientists conducting research on a skull found on-site by Harrington in the 1930s revealed it actually was a type of extinct, stilt-legged horse that died out during the last ice age (around 13,000 BC). The species was found not to be closely related to modern horses and was renamed Haringtonhippus francisci after Canadian scientist Charles Harington.

Local conservationists have proposed the area, along with Frenchman Mountain and Sunrise Mountain, be protected as a national monument.

== See also ==
- List of caves in the United States
- National Register of Historic Places listings in Clark County, Nevada
