= Frenchman Lake (Nova Scotia) =

Lake in Nova Scotia, Canada

- Location within Nova Scotia
- Location: Halifax Regional Municipality, Nova Scotia
- Coordinates: 44°41′55.6″N 63°34′35.5″W
- Basin countries: Canada

Frenchman Lake is a lake of Halifax Regional Municipality, Nova Scotia, Canada in the community of Dartmouth.

== See also ==
- List of lakes in Nova Scotia
