= Old Butt Knob =

Mountain in North Carolina, United States

Coordinates: 35°22′18.5″N 82°50′35.8″W

Old Butt Knob is a summit in Haywood County, North Carolina, in the United States. It is located within Pisgah National Forest. With an elevation of 5,522 feet (1,683 m), Old Butt Knob is the 114th highest mountain in North Carolina.

A hiking trail leads to Old Butt Knob's peak.
