= Nobs (surname) =

Nobs is a Swiss surname. Notable people with this surname include:

- Armindo Nobs Ferreira, Brazilian football manager
- Claude Nobs (1936-2013), Swiss festival director
- Emanuel Nobs (1910–1985), Swiss painter
- Ernst Nobs (1886-1957), Swiss politician
- Heidi Baader-Nobs (born 1940), Swiss composer
- Olivia Nobs (born 1982), Swiss snowboarder
