= Trimble Knob =

Virginian conical hill

- Photo of Trimble Knob, taken December 2011

Highest point
- Coordinates: 38°24′17″N 79°35′16″W

Geography
- Location: Southwest of Monterey, Virginia

Geology
- Rock age: 35.0 ± 0.5 Ma
- Mountain type: Eroded volcano or diatreme
- Last eruption: 35 Ma

Trimble Knob, located southwest of Monterey in Highland County, Virginia, is a conical hill composed of basalt, a volcanic rock, of Eocene (early Tertiary) age. It is the eroded remnant of what was an active volcano or diatreme that last erupted approximately 35 million years ago, making it one of the youngest volcanos on the east coast of North America.

== Description ==
Trimble Knob is an isolated conical hill in an otherwise relatively flat valley, surrounded by farmland. The peak of the hill has an elevation of 3123 ft (952m). U.S. Route 220 lies along the southeast flank of the hill. Trimble Knob is the most obvious of many igneous intrusions in the area.

The central part of the hill is composed of basalt with a diameter of approximately 150 metres (160 yd). The basalt intrudes through the gently dipping Devonian Needmore Formation (fossiliferous shale and calcareous mudstone), and is near the axis of a syncline in the center of the valley.

== Age ==
The basalt at Trimble Knob (and other igneous rock dikes in the area) were originally thought to be of Paleozoic age by relative age dating using cross-cutting relationships. In 1993, Southworth and others give a date of 35.0 ± 0.5 Ma for basalt of Trimble Knob In 2012, Bulas and others studied the other igneous rocks and sampled them to obtain the mineral separates and perform age dating. The amphibole minerals composing the volcanic rock Trachydacite were dated utilizing the Ar-Ar age dating method and found them to be 48.86±.37 million years of age. The age of the volcanic eruption is not explained by the age of the formation of amphibole minerals which formed at a time before the volcanic eruption occurred. There may have been a bi-model or two-stage eruption mechanism responsible for producing the different varieties of mafic and felsic volcanic rock that have been discovered and associated with this volcanism. Both age dates place the earliest age of the eruption to be during the Eocene epoch and further research is needed to better understand the timing and eruption mechanisms responsible for these rock types.

Mole Hill, located in Rockingham County, is geologically similar to Trimble Knob and thought to be contemporaneous with it, along with other intrusive igneous rocks near Ugly Mountain in Pendleton County, West Virginia.
