= Frenchmans Bluff =

Summit in Minnesota

Coordinates: 47°11′44″N 96°10′28″W

Frenchmans Bluff is an irregularly outlined hill of morainic drift in Norman County, Minnesota, in the United States. With an elevation of 1,339 feet (408 m), Frenchmans Bluff is the 62nd highest summit in the state of Minnesota.

Frenchmans Bluff was so named on account of early pioneers finding three ruined log cabins they believed to have been built by French fur traders.
