= Great Thatch =

Island in the British Virgin Islands

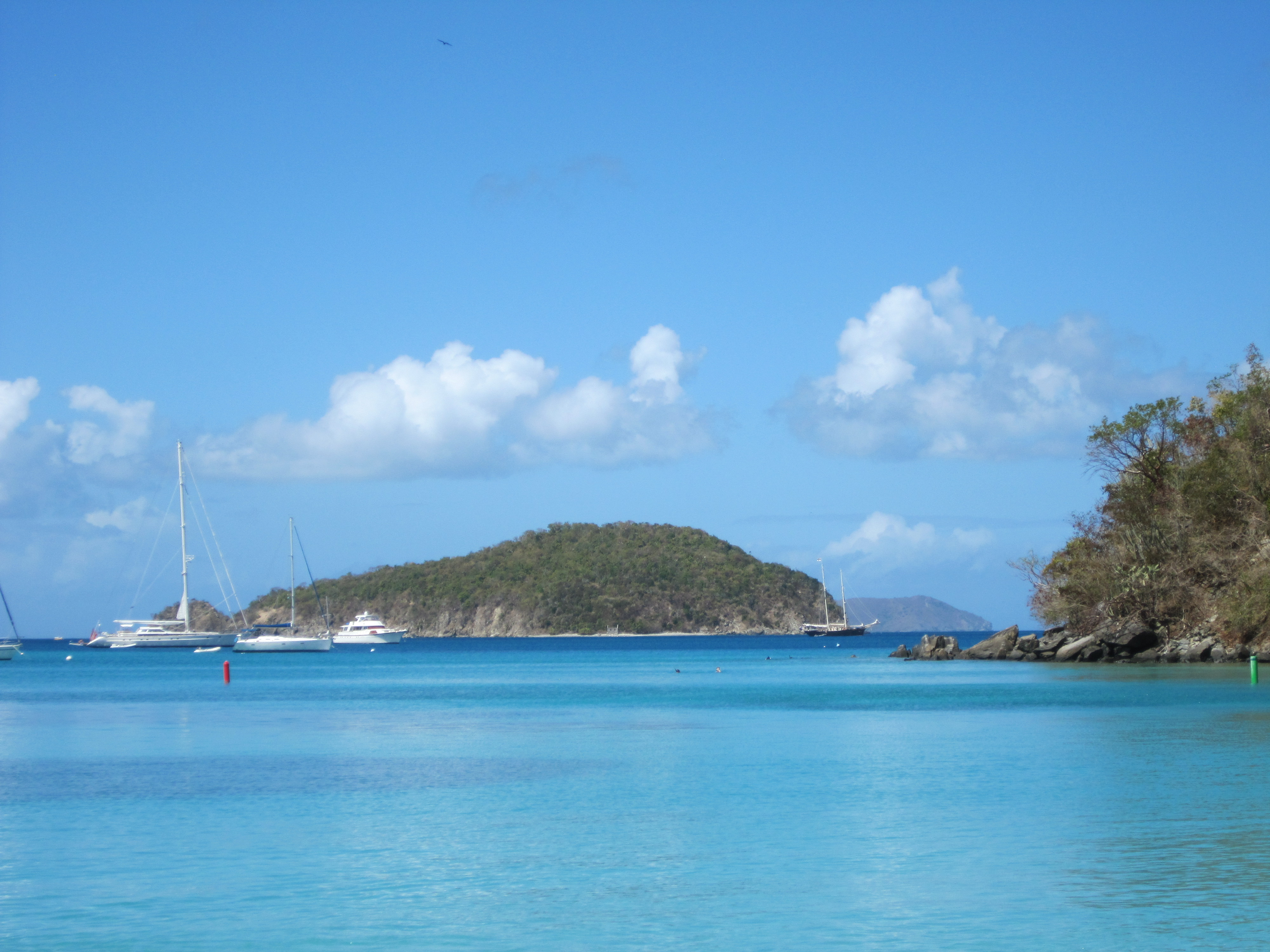

- The location of Great Thatch within the British Virgin Islands

- Location within British Virgin Islands Location within the Caribbean

Geography
- Location: Atlantic Ocean
- Coordinates: 18°23′10″N 64°44′20″W
- Archipelago: Virgin Islands

Administration
- United Kingdom
- British Overseas Territory: British Virgin Islands

Demographics
- Population: 0

Additional information
- Time zone: AST (UTC-4)
- ISO code: VG

Great Thatch is an uninhabited island of the British Virgin Islands in the Caribbean. It is one of the westernmost islands in the territory. It is believed to take its name from the famous pirate, Edward Teach (better known as "Blackbeard"), although there is little evidence Blackbeard ever sailed in the Virgin Islands.

== History ==
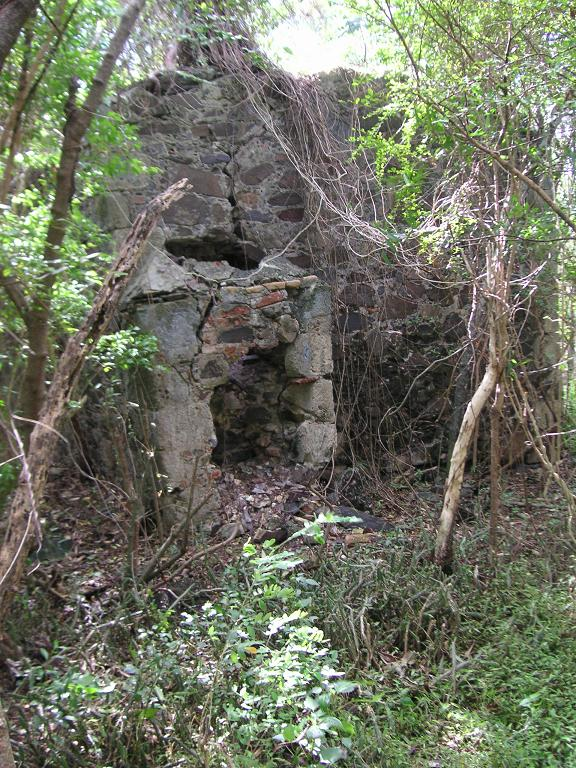
The ruin on Great Thatch.

Although presently uninhabited, it was formerly occupied, and boasted a customs house and mail exchange where the mail would be delivered from Charlotte Amalie by skiff after the packet ships had called there.

The island was the site of significant act of civil disobedience in 1856, three years' after the British community of the British Virgin Islands had largely fled during the insurrection of 1853. On 24 November 1856, the sub-Treasurer of Tortola sought to seize a boat belonging to an inhabitant of Thatch Island, as it was then known, for trading without a licence. He was assaulted and his crew badly beaten. Two days later a force of four constables was dispatched to arrest the offenders, but upon their landing they were obstructed by a crowd of 40 to 50 people. They persisted in making the arrest, and were also severely beaten. The following day, a force of some 30 men, principally rural constables, 12 of whom were armed, landed on the island to quell the insubordination and apprehend the perpetrators of the violence. In the event, it was only the intervention of Wesleyan missionaries who were influential amongst the inhabitants which enabled arrests to be made without further violence. Isaac Dookhan cites this as an example of the general spirit of unrest which prevailed in the Territory during the 1850s.

== Ruin ==
There remains a significant ruin on the island, although it is extremely difficult to access as the paths are all heavily overgrown.

== National park ==
The island was formerly in private hands, but was repurchased by the government of the territory in September 1997, and is now a national park.

The island provides habitat for the crested anole (Anolis cristatellus wileyae), the barred anole (Anolis stratulus), and the big-scaled least gecko (Sphaerodactylus macrolepis macrolepis).
