= Frenchman Lake (Yukon) =

Lake in Yukon, Canada

- Location within Yukon
- Location: Yukon
- Coordinates: 62°10′N 135°50′W
- Basin countries: Canada
- Surface area: 1,441 ha (3,560 acres)
- Average depth: 14.6 m (48 ft)
- Max. depth: 65 m (213 ft)
- Surface elevation: 575 m (1,886 ft)

Frenchman Lake is a lake located in Carmacks, Yukon, Canada. The lake is located at an elevation of 575 m (1,886 ft), has an area of 1,441 ha (3,560 acres), a maximum depth of 65 m (213 ft) and an average depth of 14.6 m (48 ft).
