= Rattlesnake Knob =

Coordinates: 43°37′26″N 89°52′28″W

Rattlesnake Knob is a summit in Sauk County, Wisconsin, in the United States. With an elevation of 1,204 feet (367 m), Rattlesnake Knob is the 105th highest summit in the state of Wisconsin. The summit lies adjacent to the Haystack Hills and about five miles west of Wisconsin Dells, Wisconsin along route H.

Rattlesnake Knob was named for the rattlesnakes seen there by settlers.
