= Ugly Mountain =

Mountain in West Virginia, United States

Highest point
- Elevation: 2,632 ft (802 m)
- Prominence: 273 ft (83 m)

Geography
- Location: Pendleton County, West Virginia
- Country: United States
- State: West Virginia
- Region: Valley and Ridge
- Range coordinates: 38°26′10.64″N 79°19′25″W
- Parent range: Appalachian Mountains

Geology
- Formed by: delimitation caused by large scale plate motion change.
- Rock age: 42.8 ± 0.5 Ma
- Mountain type: Dike plug
- Rock type(s): Dacite, Rhyolite
- Last eruption: 42.8 ± 0.5 Ma

Location of Ugly Mountain

Ugly Mountain is a summit in Pendleton County, West Virginia, in the United States. With an elevation of 2,598 feet (792 m), Ugly Mountain is the 507th highest summit in the state of West Virginia.

Ugly Mountain is a volcanic neck with a diatreme breccia that formed during the Middle Eocene.

== Background ==
Ugly Mountain is a part of the larger Eocene Epoch volcanic flare up in western Virginia and far eastern West Virginia. These volcanoes erupted between 48-42 Ma and are the youngest known volcanoes along the US East Coast, happening over 150 Ma since the Central Atlantic magmatic province during the rifting of Pangea. Unlike volcanoes further east, (Trimble Knob and Mole Hill having mafic lava's), Ugly Mountains volcanics are younger (~4-5 Ma), and more felsic in nature.

== See also ==
- Trimble Knob
- Mole Hill (Virginia)
