= Chestnut Knob, West Virginia =

Unincorporated community in West Virginia, United States

- Unincorporated community
- Location within the state of West Virginia Chestnut Knob, West Virginia (the United States)
- Coordinates: 37°24′21″N 80°54′22″W
- Country: United States
- State: West Virginia
- County: Mercer
- Elevation: 2,749 ft (838 m)
- Time zone: UTC-5 (Eastern (EST))
  - Summer (DST): UTC-4 (EDT)
- Area codes: 304 & 681
- GNIS feature ID: 1549624

Chestnut Knob is an unincorporated community in Mercer County, West Virginia, United States. Chestnut Knob is 6 miles (9.7 km) east-southeast of Athens.
