= Little Thatch =

Island in the British Virgin Islands

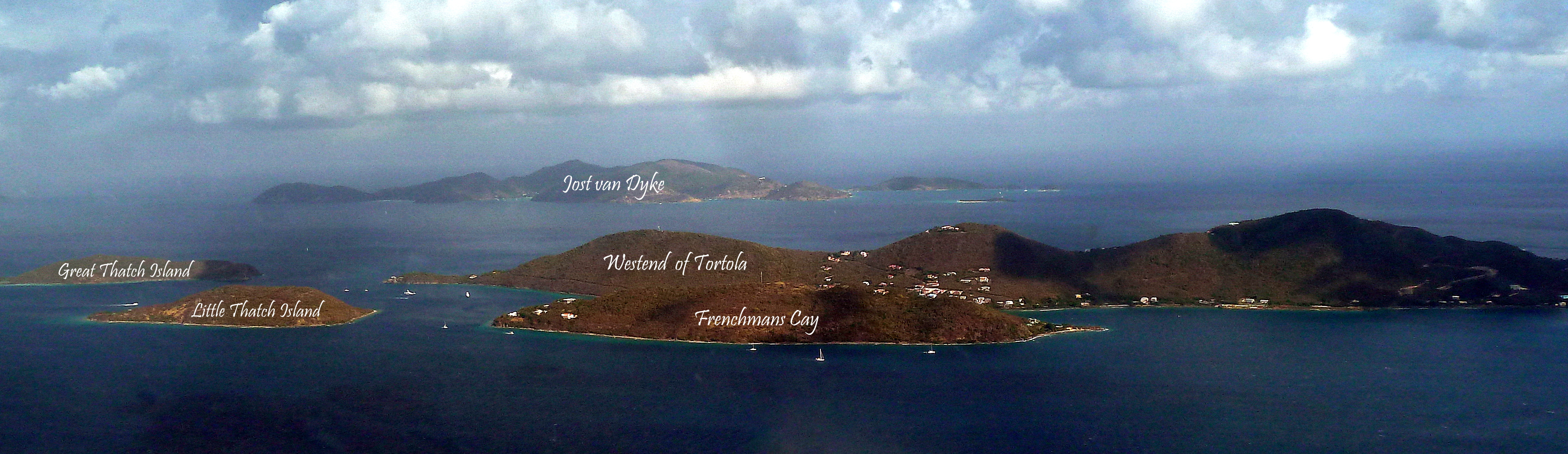
- Little Thatch on the left

- The location of Little Thatch within the British Virgin Islands

- Location within British Virgin Islands Location within the Caribbean

Geography
- Location: Caribbean Sea
- Coordinates: 18.3815°N 64.7160°W
- Archipelago: Virgin Islands

Administration
- United Kingdom
- British Overseas Territory: British Virgin Islands

Additional information
- Time zone: AST (UTC-4)
- ISO code: VG

Little Thatch is a privately owned island of the British Virgin Islands in the Caribbean, upon which a resort has been built. The island is located less than 500 yards (460 m) from the western end of Tortola, and is less than 1 mile (1.6 km) away from Saint John, United States Virgin Islands. The island was sold by John and Jill Maynard in December 2014 to the owners of OtterBox, Curt and Nancy Richardson.

It is believed to take its name from the famous pirate, Edward Teach (better known as "Blackbeard"), although there is little evidence Blackbeard ever sailed in the Virgin Islands.

The island provides habitat for the big-scaled least gecko (Sphaerodactylus macrolepis macrolepis).
