= Gypsum Cave Mine (Nevada) =

Mine in Clark, Nevada, United States

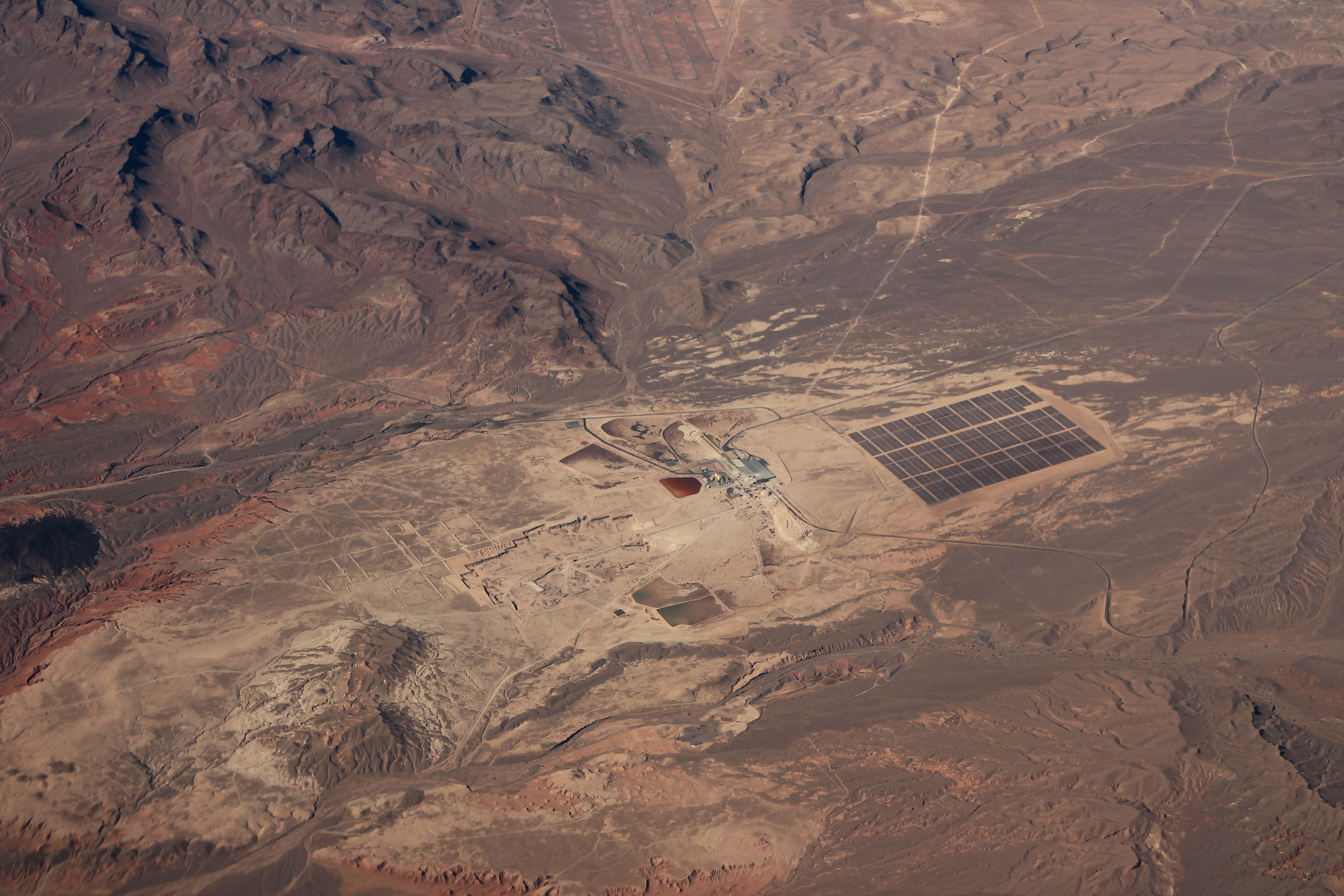
- Aerial view of the gypsum processing plant and surrounding area

- Location within Nevada Location within the United States
- Location: Clark, Nevada, United States; 36.2239°N 114.89940°W
- Products: Gypsum, anhydrite, uranium
- Company: Bureau of Land Management

The Gypsum Cave Mine is a gypsum-anhydrite and uranium mine located in Clark County, Nevada, United States, on the Intermontane Plateaus, 12 miles (19 km) east of North Las Vegas.

== Description ==
The mines primary products are gypsum and anhydrite, and its tertiary product is uranium. It is managed by the Bureau of Land Management. The excavation of its primary products is considered viable, but not the case for its uranium. The Gypsum Cave Mine is also located a mile (1.6 km) northeast the Gypsum Cave, which is a limestone cave that is listed on the National Register of Historic Places.
