= Hairy Knob =

Mountain in Texas, United States

Coordinates: 30°54′11″N 99°3′20″W

Hairy Knob is a summit in Mason County, Texas, in the United States. At an elevation of 1,808 feet (551 m), Hairy Knob is the 908th tallest peak in Texas.
