= Bald Knob (Missouri) =

Mountain in Missouri, U.S.

- Location within Missouri Location within the United States

Highest point
- Elevation: 1,574 ft (480 m)
- Prominence: 94 ft (29 m)
- Isolation: 0.54 mi (0.87 km)
- Coordinates: 37.71477°N 90.709333°W

Geography
- Location: Missouri
- Parent range: St. Francois Mountains

Bald Knob is a summit in St. Francois County, Missouri, United States. It has an elevation of 1,574 feet (480 m), and was named after its treeless peak.
