= Sidneys Knob =

Landform in Pennsylvania, United States

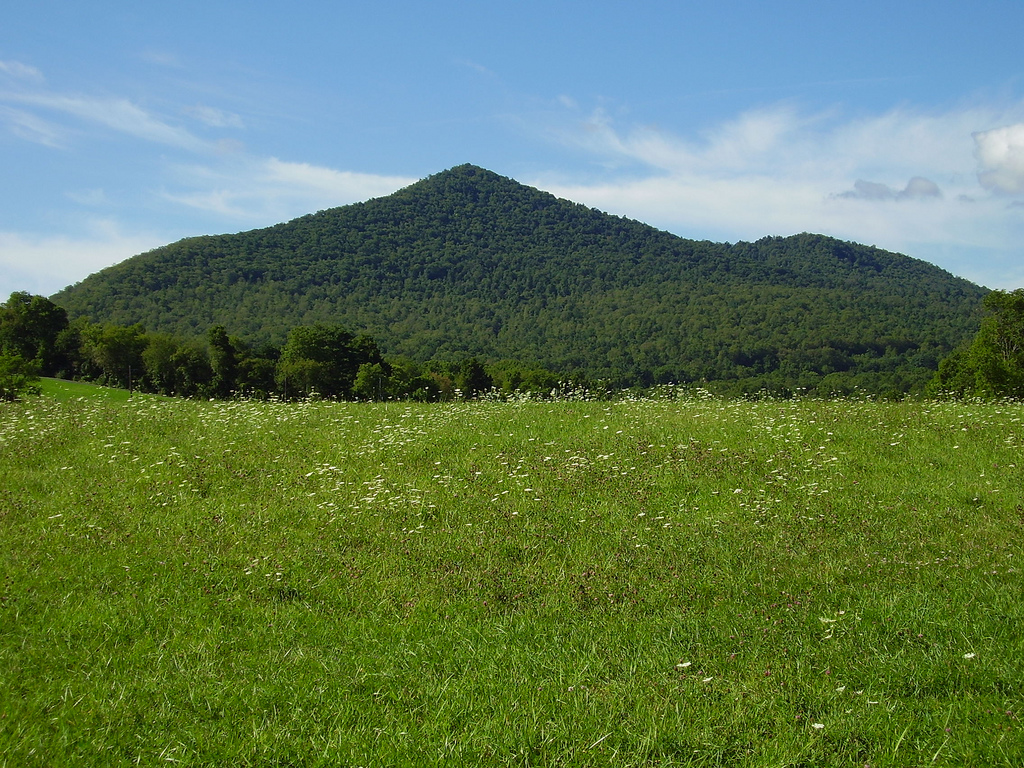
- Sidneys Knob

Highest point
- Elevation: 2,115 ft (645 m)
- Coordinates: 40°03′50″N 77°54′01″W

Geography
- Location: Fulton County, Pennsylvania, U.S.
- Parent range: Appalachian Mountains
- Topo map: USGS Burnt Cabins (PA) Quadrangle

Sidneys Knob appears to be an atypical mountain for Pennsylvania when viewed from the northeast. Most of the mountains in the Commonwealth are long linear ridges or flatted topped plateau mountains. Sidneys Knob is part of a bifurcated ridgeline as seen in the topographic map below.

The mountain is seen on postcards, mainly viewed from the Pennsylvania Turnpike, as vehicles exit west out of the Tuscarora Mountain Tunnel northeast of the peak. Sometimes referred to as "Pyramid Point" or on early postcards as Henry's Knob, this landmark is one of the most noted on the turnpike.

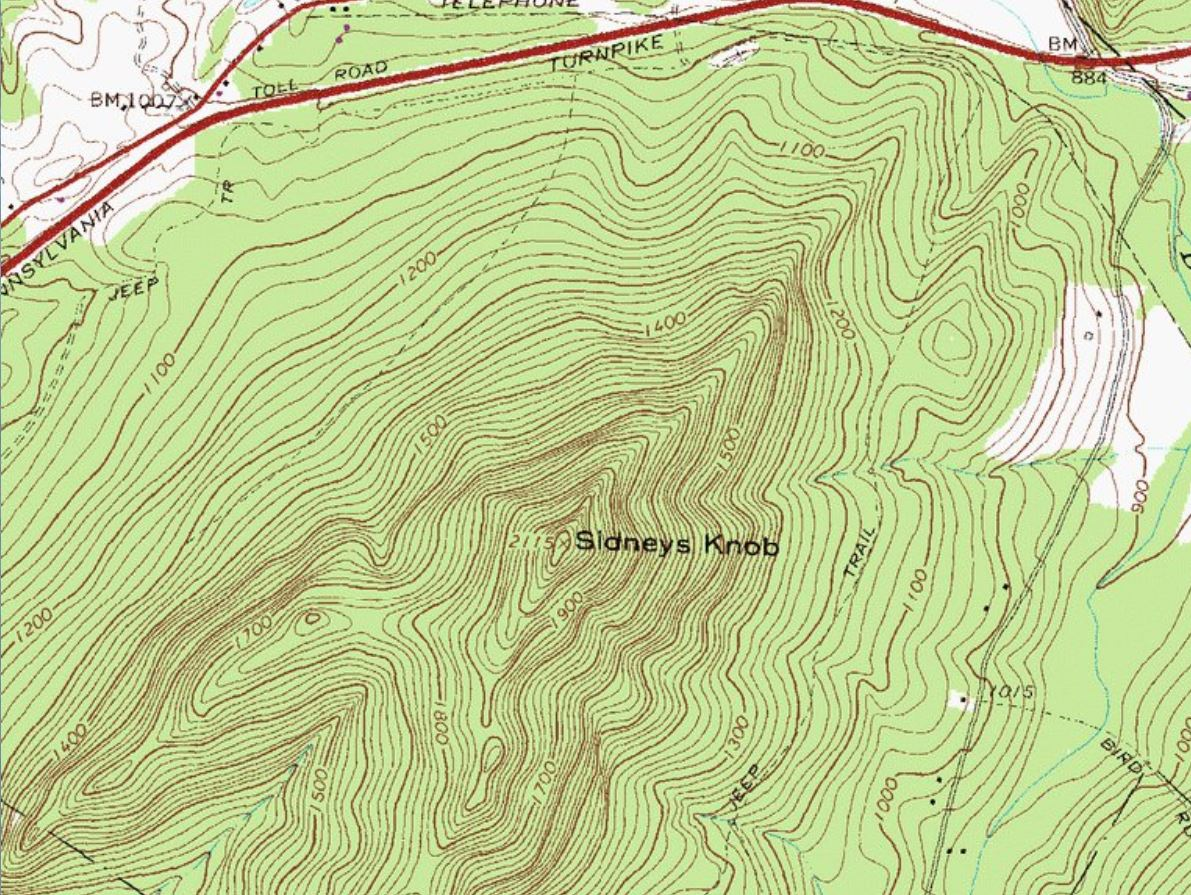
Portion of the Burnt Cabins, PA 7.5 Minute USGS Topographic Quadrangle, 1984 ed. showing the location and shape of Sidneys Knob
