= Loaf of Bread Butte =

Mountain in Montana, United States

Coordinates: 46°09′52″N 105°29′37″W

Loaf of Bread Butte is a summit in Custer County, Montana, in the United States. With an elevation of 2,818 feet (859 m), Loaf of Bread Butte is the 3139th highest summit in the state of Montana.
