= Knob Lick, Casey County, Kentucky =

Knob Lick
- Unincorporated community
- Location within the state of Kentucky Knob Lick (the United States)
- Coordinates: 37°29′59″N 84°52′5″W
- Country: United States
- State: Kentucky
- County: Casey
- Elevation: 1,352 ft (412 m)
- Time zone: UTC-6 (Central (CST))
  - Summer (DST): UTC-5 (CST)
- GNIS feature ID: 2568412

Knob Lick was an unincorporated community in Casey County, Kentucky, United States. It is now a ghost town.
