= Frenchman Knob =

Summit in Kentucky, United States

- Location within Kentucky

Highest point
- Elevation: 1,158 ft (353 m)
- Coordinates: 37°21′17″N 085°52′25″W

Geography
- Location: Hart County, Kentucky

Frenchman Knob is a summit in Hart County, Kentucky, in the United States. With an elevation of 1,158 feet (353 m), Frenchman Knob is the 537th highest summit in the state of Kentucky.

It was so named because a Frenchman was scalped upon it.
