= Basil Newby =

British businessman

Joseph Warren Basil Newby MBE (born 1 October 1951) is an English entrepreneur and businessman. Simply known as Basil, he was born in the Fylde coast town of Blackpool, Lancashire, where he has lived and worked all his life.

Newby worked as a bluecoat at Pontins in the early 1970s. His first business was the 'Gone Gay' fancy goods shop in Blackpool. In 1979 Newby took over The Flamingo, a nightclub on Talbot Road, which he reopened as Blackpool's first gay nightclub, later expanding to use more of the building, with capacity for 2,000 customers. He has since expanded his In The Pink Leisure Ltd empire to include several bars.

The Flamingo building was demolished in 2007, but Newby went on further success with his burlesque show Funny Girls, which has been described as "a Broadway musical meets rock concert meets Lily Savage", adding millions of pounds to his fortune.

In 2003, Newby reportedly had a personal fortune of over £15 million.

Newby was awarded an MBE in the 2014 New Year Honours list.
