= Red Knob, West Virginia =

Red Knob
- Unincorporated community
- Location within the state of West Virginia
- Coordinates: 38°43′29″N 81°30′46″W
- Country: United States
- State: West Virginia
- County: Roane
- Elevation: 971 ft (296 m)
- Time zone: UTC-5 (Eastern (EST))
  - Summer (DST): UTC-4 (EDT)
- GNIS ID: 1555453

Red Knob is an unincorporated community in Roane County, West Virginia, United States.
