= Bald Knob (Franklin County, Virginia) =

Summit in Franklin County, Virginia

Coordinates: 36°59′56.4″N 79°52′53.9″W

Bald Knob is a summit located in Franklin County, Virginia. The summit has an elevation of 1400 feet and is a familiar landmark overlooking the county seat, Rocky Mount.
