= List of mountains in Custer County, Montana =

There are at least 49 named mountains in Custer County, Montana.

- Angelwing Butte, 46°22′52″N 105°44′01″W, el. 3,100 feet (940 m)
- Badland Butte, 46°26′15″N 105°44′04″W, el. 2,687 feet (819 m)
- Baldy Butte, 46°04′56″N 106°09′54″W, el. 3,268 feet (996 m)
- Baldy Butte, 46°14′31″N 105°09′55″W, el. 3,232 feet (985 m)
- Baldy Peak, 46°26′06″N 105°25′52″W, el. 3,232 feet (985 m)
- Big Hill, 46°29′23″N 105°55′05″W, el. 2,700 feet (820 m)
- Big Peak, 46°30′42″N 105°25′08″W, el. 3,153 feet (961 m)
- Blue Mountain, 46°28′20″N 105°24′45″W, el. 3,287 feet (1,002 m)
- Blue Mountains, 46°26′50″N 105°24′47″W, el. 3,035 feet (925 m)
- Bracket Butte, 46°26′55″N 104°57′46″W, el. 3,205 feet (977 m)
- Buck Mountain, 46°27′43″N 105°26′18″W, el. 3,314 feet (1,010 m)
- Camelsback, 46°23′04″N 105°51′25″W, el. 2,490 feet (760 m)
- Carbon Hill, 46°23′50″N 105°49′06″W, el. 2,526 feet (770 m)
- Chalk Butte, 46°50′33″N 106°04′43″W, el. 3,028 feet (923 m)
- Chimney Butte, 45°50′52″N 105°07′34″W, el. 3,300 feet (1,000 m)
- Corral Butte, 46°31′33″N 105°25′51″W, el. 3,018 feet (920 m)
- Dug Long Hill, 46°12′10″N 105°39′13″W, el. 2,661 feet (811 m)
- Government Hill, 46°24′34″N 105°40′04″W, el. 2,982 feet (909 m)
- Gravel Hill (Montana), 46°12′14″N 105°40′17″W, el. 2,713 feet (827 m)
- Green Mountain, 46°29′26″N 105°24′40″W, el. 3,287 feet (1,002 m)
- Harris Buttes, 45°56′57″N 105°34′55″W, el. 3,264 feet (995 m)
- Hayes Point, 45°49′03″N 106°01′34″W, el. 3,766 feet (1,148 m)
- Henry Woods Mountain, 46°23′31″N 105°03′02″W, el. 3,241 feet (988 m)
- Horse Creek Hill, 46°41′41″N 105°58′24″W, el. 3,133 feet (955 m)
- Ingersol Butte, 46°46′35″N 105°41′15″W, el. 2,884 feet (879 m)
- Kirkpatrick Hill, 45°58′01″N 105°40′20″W, el. 3,258 feet (993 m)
- Loaf of Bread Butte, 46°09′52″N 105°29′37″W, el. 2,825 feet (861 m)
- Lookout Butte, 46°25′10″N 106°03′22″W, el. 2,808 feet (856 m)
- Maxwell Butte, 45°54′46″N 105°16′58″W, el. 3,720 feet (1,130 m)
- Montague Butte, 46°24′25″N 105°05′09″W, el. 3,192 feet (973 m)
- Rattlesnake Butte, 46°27′30″N 105°06′07″W, el. 3,189 feet (972 m)
- Red Butte, 46°00′29″N 105°45′00″W, el. 3,189 feet (972 m)
- Red Butte, 45°47′22″N 106°07′45″W, el. 3,678 feet (1,121 m)
- Red Knob, 46°17′18″N 105°07′36″W, el. 3,212 feet (979 m)
- Saddle Horse Butte, 45°59′35″N 105°26′49″W, el. 3,251 feet (991 m)
- Signal Butte, 46°23′22″N 105°45′25″W, el. 3,097 feet (944 m)
- Snake Butte, 45°51′10″N 105°12′30″W, el. 3,399 feet (1,036 m)
- Steamboat Butte, 46°33′17″N 105°45′39″W, el. 2,451 feet (747 m)
- Strawberry Hill, 46°25′22″N 105°40′28″W, el. 3,113 feet (949 m)
- Sundown Butte, location unknown, el. 2,943 feet (897 m)
- Sunrise Peak, 46°27′32″N 105°27′34″W, el. 3,068 feet (935 m)
- Tepee Butte, 46°06′12″N 105°01′24″W, el. 3,008 feet (917 m)
- The Knob, 46°28′21″N 105°33′41″W, el. 3,218 feet (981 m)
- Tower Butte, 46°29′05″N 105°39′25″W, el. 2,838 feet (865 m)
- Twin Buttes, 45°52′21″N 105°10′20″W, el. 3,487 feet (1,063 m)
- Twin Buttes, 46°01′43″N 106°04′22″W, el. 3,025 feet (922 m)
- Twin Buttes, 46°29′22″N 105°06′03″W, el. 3,176 feet (968 m)
- White Knob, 46°16′43″N 105°03′50″W, el. 3,166 feet (965 m)
- Wild Horse Mountain, 45°54′34″N 105°35′57″W, el. 3,419 feet (1,042 m)

== See also ==
- List of mountains in Montana
- List of mountain ranges in Montana
