= Frenchman Range =

Mountain range in Clark County, Nevada, United States

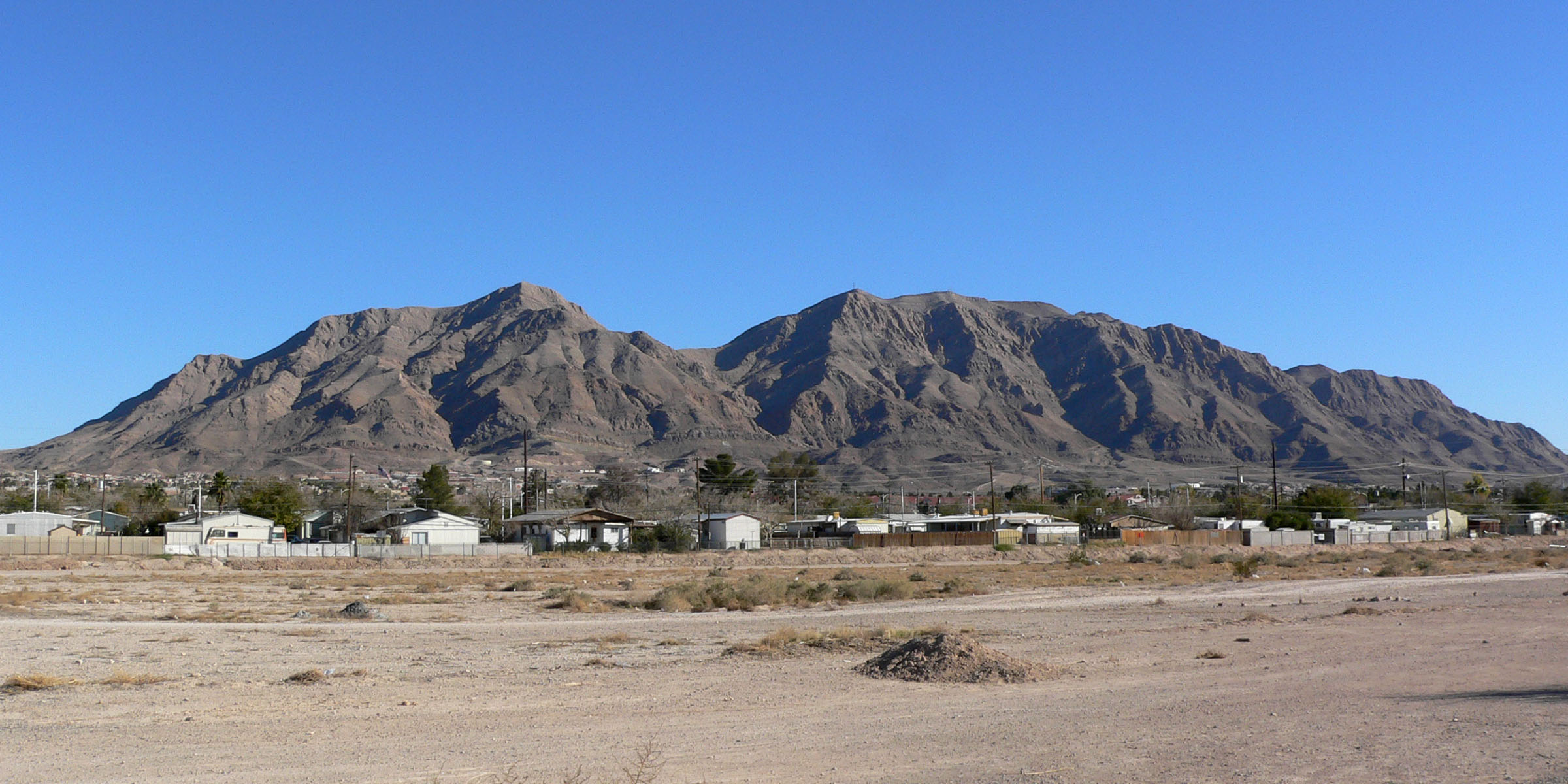
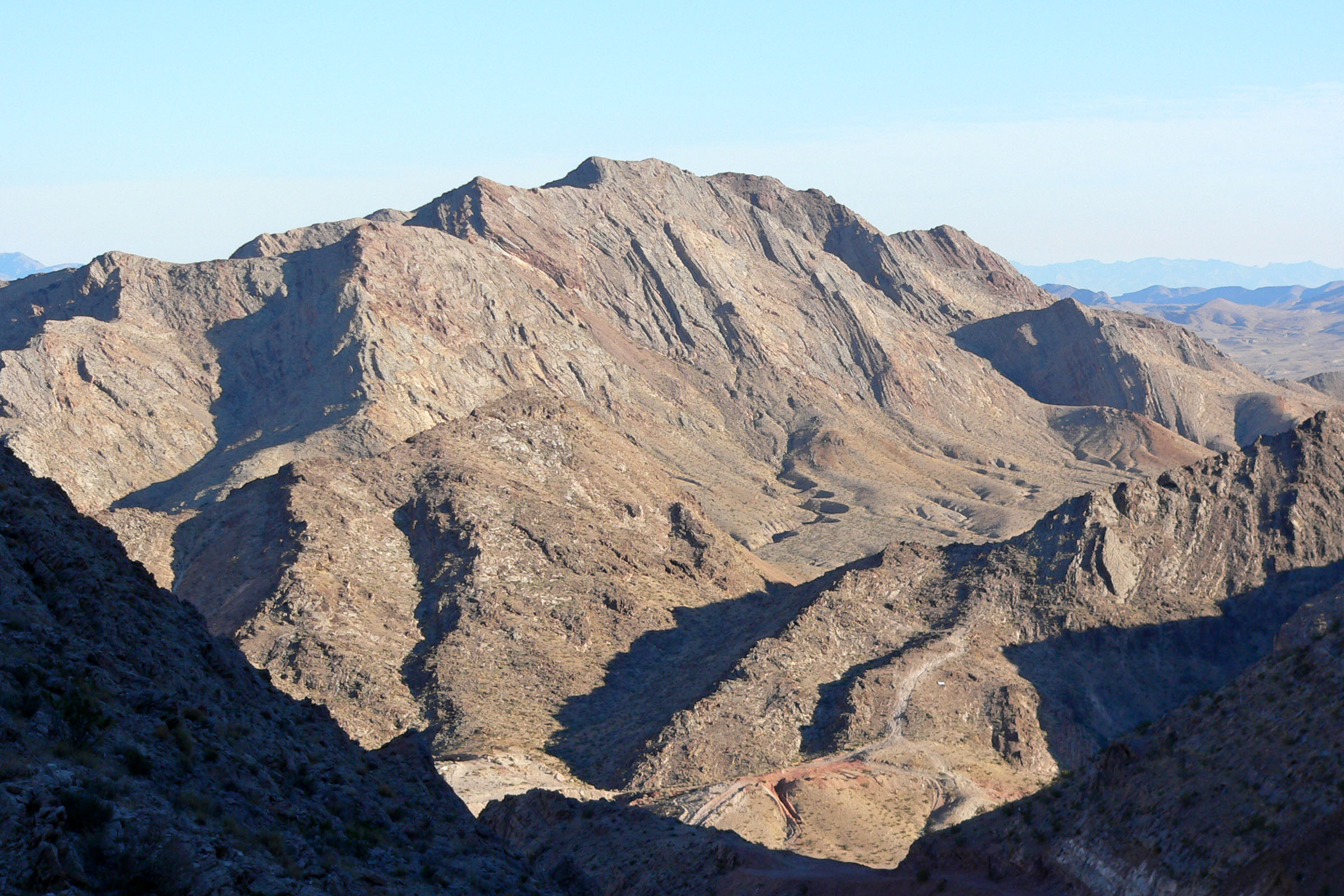
- Frenchman Mountain Sunrise Mountain

Highest point
- Peak: Frenchman Mountain
- Elevation: 1,235.0496 m (4,052.000 ft)

Geography
- Location within Nevada
- Country: United States
- State: Nevada
- District: Clark County
- Range coordinates: 36°9′52.906″N 114°57′57.986″W
- Topo map(s): USGS USGS Frenchman Mountain, NV

The Frenchman Range is a mountain range in Clark County, Nevada. The short range is composed of only two mountains including Frenchman Mountain and Sunrise Mountain.
