= Knob Lick, Estill County, Kentucky =

Unincorporated community in Kentucky, United States

Knob Lick, Kentucky
- Unincorporated community
- Location within Kentucky
- Coordinates: 37°37′48″N 84°06′29″W
- Country: United States
- State: Kentucky
- County: Estill
- Elevation: 899 ft (274 m)
- Time zone: UTC-5 (Eastern (EST))
  - Summer (DST): UTC-4 (EDT)
- Area code: 606
- GNIS feature ID: 2440457

Knob Lick is an unincorporated community in Estill County, Kentucky, United States. Knob Lick is 9 miles (14 km) west-southwest of Irvine.
