= The Knob (Indiana) =

- Location within Indiana

Highest point
- Elevation: 1,051 ft (320 m)
- Coordinates: 41°39′08″N 85°21′15″W

Geography
- Location: LaGrange County, Indiana, United States
- Topo map: USGS Mongo

The Knob (elevation 1,051 feet/320 meters) is the fourth highest named point in the U.S. state of Indiana after Weed Patch Hill, Sand Hill, and Hoosier Hill. It is located in Bloomfield Township in LaGrange County, approximately three miles east of the town of LaGrange.
