= Elsehul =

Embayment in South Georgia Island

Coordinates: 54.0166667°S 37.9833333°W

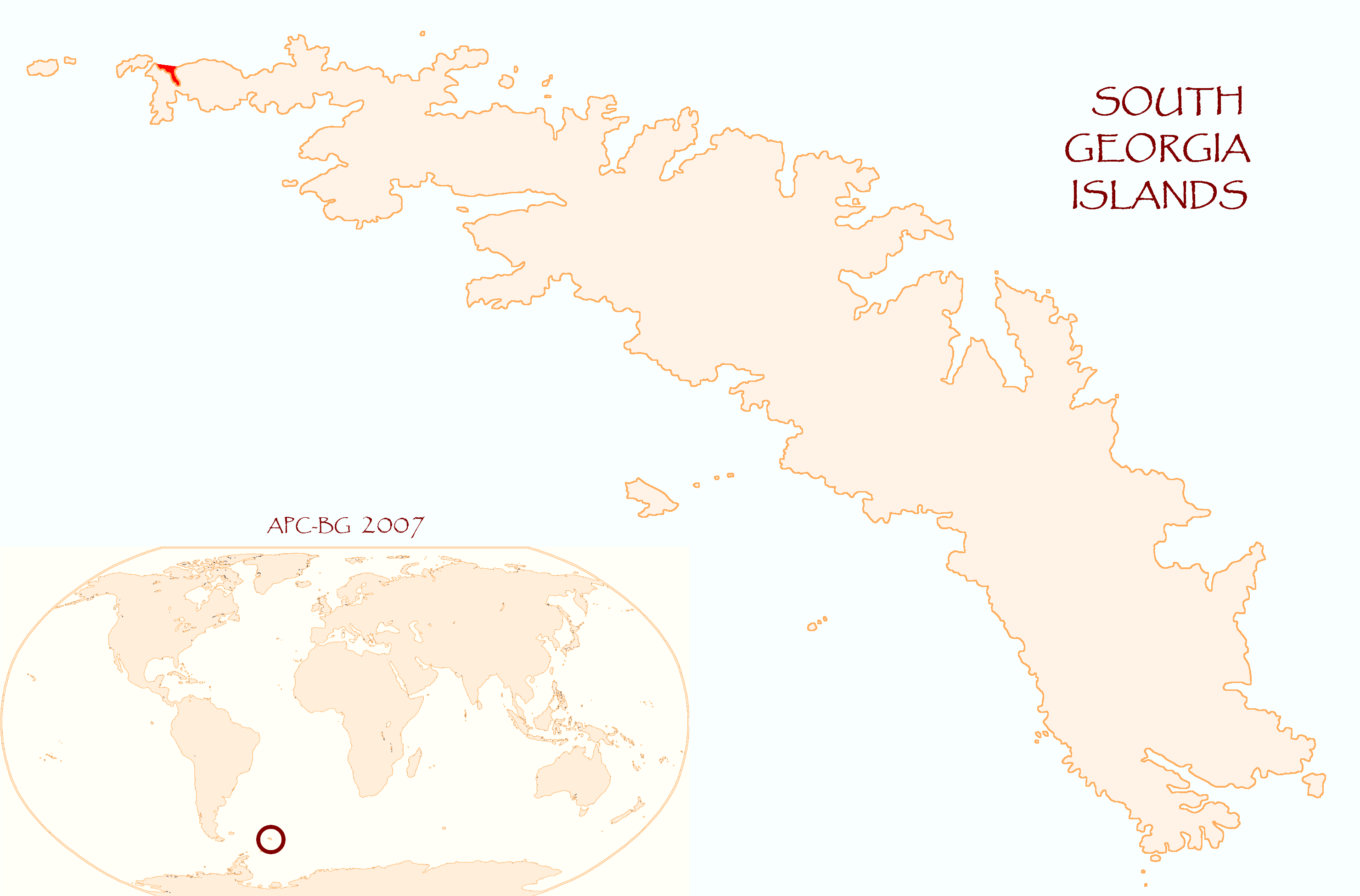
Location of Elsehul on South Georgia Island

Elsehul (also Paddocks Cove, Else Cove, Elsie Bay, Elsa Bay, Else's Hole, and Else Bay) is a bay along the north coast of South Georgia Island in the southern Atlantic Ocean. Elsehul is approximately 0.5 miles (0.8 km) wide, and is separated from nearby Undine Harbour by the narrow Survey Isthmus. The name "Elsehul" dates back to the period 1905–12 and was probably applied by Norwegian sealers and whalers working in the area. The Discovery Investigations (DI) expedition of 1930 surveyed Elsehul and the surrounding area, naming many features. A British Admiralty chart dating to 1931 provided the first instance of many other names; unless otherwise specified, features noted in this article were first named on this chart.

== Named features ==
=== Western shore ===
A shoal known as Fairway Patch lies in the entrance of the bay. The west side of the entrance is a small promontory 40 m (130 ft) high called Post Rock.

During their 1930 survey, DI personnel charted and named The Knob, a conspicuous 40 m (130 ft) high dome-shaped rock on the west side of the bay. The Knob defines the east coast of a small cove, Joke Cove. South of The Knob is Inner Bay, which comprises the entire southern portion of Elsehul.

=== Eastern shore ===
On the eastern shore, Pyramid Point defines the eastern boundary of Inner Bay. Continuing north, Pull Point sits half a nautical mile (.93 km) south of Cape Pride, which marks the east side of the entrance to Elsehul. Cape Pride appears to have been named by DI personnel. Just northwest is Stina Rock, a conical rock 35 m (115 ft) high. It was originally named "Pillar Rock," but renamed to avoid confusion with another feature of that name. The name Stina Rock was proposed by the United Kingdom Antarctic Place-Names Committee (UK-APC) in 1957.

Sørn and Bernt are two conspicuous rocks that sit 2 nautical miles (3.7 km) northeast of Cape Pride. The name appears on a chart based upon surveys by DI personnel between 1926 and 1930, and comes from Søren Berntsen and Herman Berntsen, managers of the Tønsberg Hvalfangeri whaling station at Husvik.
