= Aikane (film) =

2023 Hawaii animated short film

- Directed by: Daniel Sousa, Dean Hamer, Joe Wilson
- Written by: Dean Hamer
- Produced by: Hinaleimoana Wong-Kalu, Daniel Karslake, Judith Light
- Music by: Dan Golden
- Production company: Qwaves in association with Kanaka Pakipika
- Release date: 2023
- Running time: 14 minutes
- Country: United States

Aikāne is a 2023 animated short film based on a mythical love and adventure story rooted in the Hawaiian tradition of aikāne, or intimate partners of the same sex. The film is directed by Daniel Sousa, Dean Hamer, and Joe Wilson, produced by Kumu Hinaleimoana Wong-Kalu, and executive produced by Judith Light and Daniel Karslake. It premiered at the Animayo and Seattle International Film Festivals, was awarded at multiple children's, indigenous, LGBTQ+ and other film festivals around the world, and qualified for the 96th Academy Awards by winning top jury awards at the New Hampshire and Hawaii International Film Festivals.

== Plot ==
A warrior, wounded in battle against foreign invaders, is rescued from an underwater world by an octopus, who transforms into a handsome young man. The pair falls in love.

== Production ==
Co-directors Hamer and Wilson, a married couple, were inspired to make the film by their belief that everybody, especially young people, deserve to see a queer love story with a happy ending. The idea for the plot came to them while free-diving in the ocean near their home in Hawaiʻi. The film, which has no dialogue, reflects this theme by portraying the underwater world as a place of peace and connection contrasted to the world above which is full of noise and conflict.

Co-director and animator Sousa created the animatic, designed the characters and backgrounds, and did the animation and the compositing using Adobe Animate, Photoshop, After Effects and Blender. Sousa, who previously worked with the team on their animated short Kapaemahu, approached the project from a painters perspective, using light as the motif to connect the different worlds depicted by the film.

== Reception ==
Aikāne received press attention and positive reviews in several publications including Variety, which called the film "radiant," Zippy Frames, which described it as "tender and strong," and Them, which described it as "a universal love story rooted in Native Hawaiian tradition." It was selected in film festivals around the world.

Festival / Organization	Award	Result
Provincetown International Film Festival	Best Animated Short	Won
New Hampshire Film Festival	Best Animation	Won
Newport Beach Film Festival	Audience Award	Won
Hawai'i International Film Festival	Best Made in Hawai'i Short	Won
Chicago International Childrenʻs Film Festival	Embrace Award	Won
DeadCenter Film Festival	Best Pride SHort	Won
DC Asian Pacific American Film Festiv	Best Narrative Short	Won
Out at the Movies Film Festival	Best Narrative Short	Won
AmiCorti Film Festival	Best Animated Short	Won
Animotion	Best Director	Won
Virginia Queer Film Festival	Best Animated SHort	Won
Animotion	Best Director	Won
New Orleans Film Festival	Best Animated Short	Nominated
Iris Prize	Best Short	Nominated
Palm Springs International ShortFest	Best Animated Short	Nominated
Seattle International Film Festival	Best Animated Short	Nominated
Indy Shorts International Film Festival	Best Animated Short	Nominated
