= Joe Wilson (director) =

American film director and producer (born 1964)

Joseph Hall Wilson (born February 8, 1964) is an American film director and producer, best known for documentaries and impact campaigns that explore oppression and empowerment among gender and sexual minority communities. He has received an Emmy, GLAAD Media and several film festival awards, and his work has been supported by the Sundance Institute, Ford Foundation, ITVS and Pacific Islanders in Communications.

== Life and career ==
Wilson was born and raised in Oil City, Pennsylvania. He graduated from the University of Pittsburgh in 1986 and served as a Peace Corps Volunteer in Mali from 1988 to 1990. Prior to filmmaking, he served as Director of the Human Rights program at the Public Welfare Foundation in Washington, D.C.

Wilson's 2010 film Out in the Silence focused on the challenges of LGBT people in his small hometown of Oil City, Pennsylvania. It was motivated by the controversy that occurred when the local paper published the announcement of his wedding to partner and fellow filmmaker Dean Hamer. Out in the Silence was supported by the Sundance Institute, premiered at the Human Rights Watch International Film Festival, and received an Emmy Award for its PBS broadcast. It also won a Special Jury Prize for Bravery in Storytelling from the Nashville Film Festival and Alternative Spirit Award from the Rhode Island International Film Festival. Subsequently, Wilson led a multi-year national film impact campaign that took the film to small towns and rural communities in every county in Pennsylvania and many locations across the United States. The campaign was highlighted in reports by the Center for Social Media at American University and the Fledgling Fund.

Wilson and Hamer's 2014 PBS films Kumu Hina and A Place in the Middle were filmed in Hawaii and focused on Polynesian cultural perspectives on gender diversity and inclusion. Kumu Hina was produced in association with Pacific Islanders in Communications and ITVS, won the Audience Award for its national PBS broadcast on Independent Lens, and received the GLAAD Media Award for Outstanding Documentary. It premiered as the closing night film at the Hawaii International Film Festival in the Hawaii Theater and won the Jury Award for Documentary at Frameline and a Special Jury award at the Pacific International Film Festival Tahiti. The accompanying educational short film A Place in the Middle premiered at the Berlin International and Toronto International Film Festivals. It was distributed to every school in Hawaii, and was also used in a national educational campaign to “make a place in the middle in every classroom” in collaboration with PBS Learning Media and Teaching Tolerance.

When a transgender student in Hawaii was denied the opportunity to participate in her graduation ceremony, Wilson produced a Youtube video about her case that was used to demand fair and consistent treatment of students across the gender spectrum. This motivated the Hawaii Department of Education to adopt policies and guidelines that protect students against discrimination based on their gender identity and expression, despite the erosion of such principles at the federal level.

In 2018, Wilson and Hamer released the feature documentary Leitis in Waiting about transgender life in the Kingdom of Tonga. The film was co-produced by the protagonist of Kumu Hina, Hinaleimoana Wong-Kalu, premiered at the British Museum in London, broadcast on the PBS series Pacific Heartbeat, and was nominated for a GLAAD Media Award. The accompanying documentary short Lady Eva premiered at the LA Film Festival and AFI Docs. Wilson and Joey Joleen Mataele, the film's protagonist and a leading Tongan human rights advocate, led an impact campaign to galvanize public support for a petition calling for the decriminalization of LGBTI people in the seven Pacific Island nations where such laws are still on the books.

In 2020, Wilson, Hamer, and Wong-Kalu continued their collaboration by co-producing and directing the animated short film Kapaemahu. It is based on the hidden history of four stones on Waikiki Beach placed there as a tribute to four legendary mahu who first brought the healing arts from Tahiti to Hawaii. The film is narrated in Olelo Niihau, the only form of the Hawaiian language unbroken by Western contact and colonization. Kapaemahu premiered and won the Special Jury Prize at the Tribeca Film Festival, screened theatrically, won four Oscar-qualifying jury awards, and was shortlisted for Best Animated Short Film at the 93rd Academy Awards. In 2022, Kokila published a children's book by the same name.
