= Kapaemahu =

Cultural monument in Hawaii

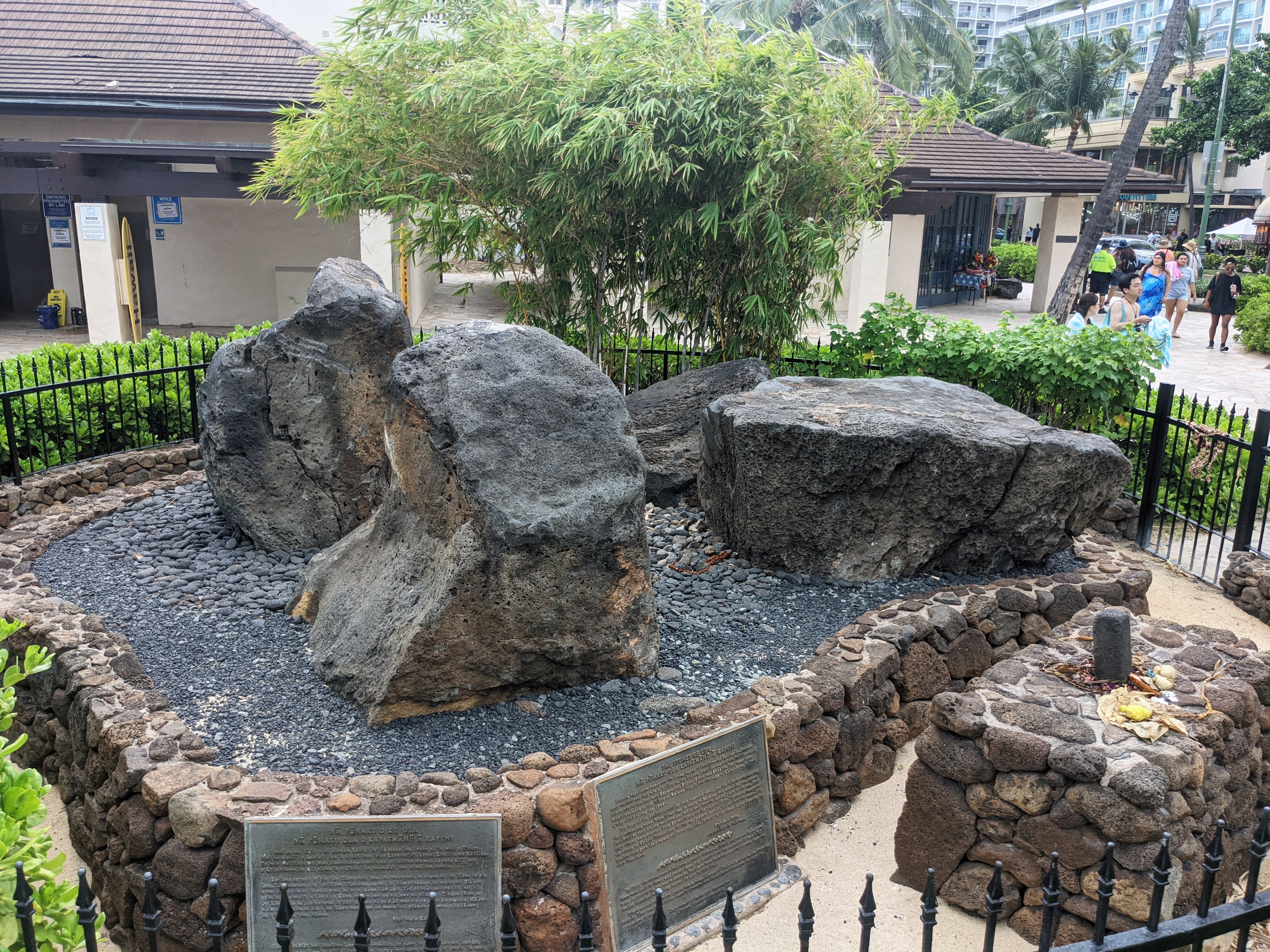
Kapaemahu (The Stones of Life) in Waikīkī.

Kapaemahu (Note: Note on orthography: this article follows the spelling conventions used in Hawaiian newspapers at the time the story of Kapaemahu was introduced to the public. In modern orthography, Kapaemahu is written as Kapaemāhū, and mahu is written as māhū.) refers to four stones on Waikīkī Beach that were placed there as tribute to four legendary mahu (third-gender individuals) who brought the healing arts from Tahiti to Hawaiʻi centuries ago. It is also the name of the leader of the healers, who according to tradition, transferred their spiritual power to the stones before they vanished. The stones are currently located inside a City and County of Honolulu monument in Honolulu at the western end of Kuhio Beach Park, close to their original home in the section of Waikiki known as Ulukou. Kapaemahu is considered significant as a cultural monument in Waikiki, an example of sacred stones in Hawaiʻi, an insight into indigenous understandings of gender and healing and the subject of an animated film and documentary film.

== Tradition of Kapaemahu ==
The tradition of Kapaemahu, like all pre-contact Hawaiian knowledge, was orally transmitted. The first written account of the story is attributed to James Harbottle Boyd, and was published by Thomas G. Thrum under the title “Tradition of the Wizard Stones Ka-Pae-Mahu” in the Hawaiian Almanac and Annual for 1907, and reprinted in 1923 under the title “The Wizard Stones of Ka-Pae-Mahu” in More Hawaiian Folk Tales. The Hawaiian name for the stones, described in the Hawaiian language newspaper Ka Nupepa Kuokoa, is "Ka Pohaku Kahuna Kapaemahu."

The story begins with the journey of four mystical figures, identified as “wizards or soothsayers,” from “the land of Moaulanuiakea (Tahiti)... to Hawaii long before the reign of King Kākuhihewa.” Their names were Kapaemāhū, who was the leader, Kinohi, Kahaloa, and Kapuni. After touring the islands of Hawaii, they settled at Ulukou in Waikīkī.

According to the moolelo, the visitors were “unsexed by nature, and their habits coincided with their feminine appearance although manly in stature and bearing,” indicating that they were mahu – a Polynesian term for third gender individuals who are neither male nor female but a mixture of both in mind, heart, and spirit. They were also described as having “courteous ways and kindly manners”' and “low, soft speech.” The “quartette of favorites of the gods” were adept in the science of healing. They effected many cures by the “laying on of hands,” and became famous across O'ahu.

When it came time for the healers to depart, there was a desire to construct a “most permanent reminder” so that “those who might come after could see the appreciation of those who had been succored and relieved of pain and suffering by their ministrations during their sojourn among them." The four mahu "gave their decision to the people as a voice from the gods."

On the night of Kāne, the people gathered near a famous “bell rock” in Kaimukī and selected four giant boulders which were moved to Waikīkī. Two were placed in the ground near their living place and two in the sea at their bathing place. Kapaemahu began a series of ceremonies and chants to embed the healers' powers within the stones, burying idols indicating the dual male and female spirit of the healers under each one. The legend also states that “sacrifice was offered of a lovely, virtuous chiefess,” and that the “incantations, prayers and fasting lasted one full moon.” Once their spiritual powers had been transferred to the stones, the four mahu vanished, and were never seen again.

== History ==
=== Traditional times ===
The stones are thought to have remained at Waikīkī from before the time of Kakuhihewa, the 16th century Alii Aimoku of Oahu, to the modern era, two on the stretch of beach now known as Kahaloa, and two in the ocean at the surf spot called Kapuni. There they served as both a sacred site for healing and a marker for a dangerous section of the outer reef known as the “Cave of the Shark God.”

=== 1905–1941 ===
The first printed mention of the stones occurred in The Pacific Commercial Advertiser in 1905. The article described how Archibald Scott Cleghorn, a Scottish-born businessman who married Princess Likelike and fathered Princess Kaʻiulani, had for two decades noticed a stone outcropping on their beach property that he thought might have religious significance. The stone was located near Likelike's customary bathing spot, and she and her daughter placed seaweed lei on it before bathing in the ocean.

While erecting a beach house on the property, Cleghorn had the approximately eight-ton boulder excavated and placed on the surface. It was judged to be of a different class than typically found on or near the beach, more likely from the hills of Kaimuki behind Kapiolani park. Another large stone, estimated to weigh 10 tons, was discovered in an adjacent lot, followed by two more, all in a straight line. The four large boulders were unearthed and placed together in the front yard of Cleghorn's beach property. According to the article, during the excavation the remains of a human skeleton with intact jawbone were discovered under the 10-ton rock. Also discovered were the remnants of four or five stone idols, two of which were cemented on top of the rocks.

When Cleghorn died in 1910, his will stipulated that “the historical stones now upon the premises . . . shall not be defaced or removed from said premises.” Nevertheless, in 1941, the Honolulu Star Bulletin reported that the stones were to be removed to make way for an air-conditioned bowling alley called Waikiki Bowls. The proposed removal of the stones was protested by Native Hawaiians, who believed that "these stones should be preserved for their traditional value and in order to retain our individuality as a community.”. The developer of the bowling alley promised to place the stones in a prominent spot, thereby gaining approval from the planning commission, but in fact the stones were buried in the foundation of the new building, where they remained for two decades.

=== Late 20th Century ===
The City and County of Honolulu condemned the Cleghorn property for a public beach in 1958, and the stones were re-identified four years later when the bowling alley was demolished and the beach area restored. In recognition of their historical significance, the stones were embedded in the sand at the new Kuhio Beach Park and marked by a plaque titled “Wizard Stones of Kapaemahu.” The 1963 dedication ceremony was attended by Hawaiian language and cultural expert Mary Kawena Pukui and Honolulu Mayor Neal Blaisdell.

The stones remained at this position until 1980, when they were moved about 50 feet further from the sea to make room for a new public restroom and concession stand. Some Hawaiian traditionalists were irate that the boulders were initially placed next to water and sewer pipes, and used by some beachgoers as a towel rack and sunbathing spot, but they were soon given a more prominent position marked by an historical plaque.

In 1997, as part of an effort led by George Kanahele to "Restore Hawaiianness to Waikiki," the stones were lifted out of the sand and placed on the stone platform of a new City and County of Honolulu cultural site constructed under the supervision of a committee led by traditional healer Papa Henry Auwae and funded by the Queen Emma Foundation. The committeeʻs vision for the healing stones emerged from the goals of protecting, revitalizing and beautifying the stones as a wahi pana, or sacred site, and included ceremonies and rituals led by Papa Auwae at auspicious times. The resulting placement and arrangement of the stones was enhanced with an altar and platform by artist and traditional sculptor Billy Fields as a sculptural public art installation titled The Stones of Life.

=== 21st Century ===
Thrumʻs original handwritten manuscript of the moolelo was discovered in the University of Hawaii archives In 2023 by filmmaker and researcher Dean Hamer, who collaborated with his partner and husband Joe WIlson and Hawaiian cultural collaborator Kumu Hinaleimoana Wong-Kalu to bring the work to public attention through a variety of platforms. In 2023, the City and County of Honolulu, at the urging of multiple community groups and advocates, added new interpretive signage to the stones of Kapaemahu. A bronze plaque, mounted on a small stone from Kaimuki, remarks briefly on the duality of male and female spirit of the healers and provides a QR code for Kapaemahu.info, which includes an augmented reality guided tour of the monument. The contextualization of the site received local, national, and Hawaiian cultural news coverage.

== Interpretations ==
The literal interpretation of Kapaemahu is “a row of mahu”: Ka is the definite singular article; pae is a row, cluster or group; and mahu is a third gender category referring to individuals with a mixture of male and female attributes.

The easiest recorded Hawaiian name of the stones was "Ka Pohaku Kahuna Kapaemahu," or the Healer Stones of Kapaemahu, correctly interpreting "Kahuna" as an expert in any field, in this case healing; however, the translation given at that time was the "Wizard Stones," which seems disrespectful by current standards. The more recently coined name "Nā Pōhaku Ola O Kapaemāhū Ā Kapuni," which translates as “The Stones of Life of Kapaemahu at Kapuni," changes the original meaning of the stones as a memorial to the four visitors and de-emphasizes the connection of the site to mahu by adding on the name Kapuni at the end.

The role of gender in the legend of Kapaemahu has been the subject of several interpretations and revisions. The mahu status of the healers was prominent in the original publication and 1941 newspaper description of the legend. However, when the stones were first recovered on Kuhio Beach in 1963, during a period of legal discrimination against mahu, the accompanying historical plaque and newspaper article made no mention of the healers' gender. A 1980 newspaper article cited Leatrice Ballesteros, a Filipino fortune teller and “Madame Pele devotee”, describing the stones as representing the spirits of two males and two females. Although this speculation has no basis in Hawaiian history or culture, it was nevertheless widely repeated in subsequent accounts of the stones. During the 1997 restoration, Hawaiian tourism advocate George Kanahele asserted that “the name Kapaemahu reflects that, 'Kapae' means 'to set aside'; mahu means 'homosexual desire", but this interpretation of Kapaemahu as “the non-homosexual stones” is inconsistent with Hawaiian usage and grammar and is not accepted by native speakers or Hawaiian scholars. The lack of any reference to mahu or gender at the site of the stones was an impetus for the community movement that led to the addition of new contextualizing signage to the stones in 2023.

== Arts and Culture ==
In an effort to restore the stones of Kapaemahu as a permanent reminder of this aspect of Hawaiian history, the original manuscript of the moolelo was used as the basis for an animated film depicting the contributions of the four mahu to healing and the subsequent suppression of their story. The animation, titled Kapaemahu, is narrated in the Niihau dialect, the only form of Hawaiian that has been continuously spoken and is the closest to the language that would have been spoken by the healers. The film premiered at the Tribeca Film Festival and was shortlisted for an Oscar at the 93rd Academy Awards. An historical account of the stones and their story was presented as a PBS documentary titled The Healer Stones of Kapaemahu, which was nationally broadcast on Pacific Heartbeat. The Bishop Museum presented an immersive multimedia exhibition, also titled The Healer Stones of Kapaemahu, that explored the relationship of the stones to healing and Oceanic history. Elements of the exhibit were subsequently put on permanent display at the Hawaii Convention Center. A hula show based on the story, The Return of Kapaemahu, was written and directed by Kumu Patrick Makuakāne and performed on the Kūhiō Beach hula mound, close to the current location of the stones, as part of the Lei Pua ʻAla Queer Histories of Hawaiʻi project.
