= Leitis in Waiting =

2018 documentary on transgender rights in Tonga

- Directed by: Dean Hamer; Joe Wilson; Hinaleimoana Wong-Kalu
- Produced by: Dean Hamer; Joe Wilson; Hinaleimoana Wong-Kalu
- Release date: April 2018 (Festival of Commonwealth Films)

Leitis In Waiting is a 2018 feature-length documentary about transgender rights in Tonga. It was produced and directed by Dean Hamer, Joe Wilson and Hinaleimoana Wong-Kalu. The filmmakers previously explored trans rights in the Pacific in their films Kumu Hina and A Place in the Middle.

== Synopsis ==
Leitis in Waiting is the story of Tonga leitīs, native transgender women fighting a rising tide of religious fundamentalism and intolerance in their South Pacific kingdom. They are led by LGBT rights activist Joleen Mataele, who founded the Tonga Leitis Association, which provides support and shelter to transgender women. The film centers on the Miss Galaxy Queen pageant, an annual beauty competition for leitīs, and on a national consultation on LGBT rights initiated by Mataele.

== Production and release ==
Dean Hamer and Joe Wilson met Joleen Mataele during a screening of Kumu Hina arranged by her long-time friend Hinaleimoana Wong-Kalu. They had originally intended to make a short film about the Miss Galaxy Queen pageant (which was later released as Lady Eva), but expanded the project when Mataele launched a national discussion in 2016 on LGBT rights in Tonga, documenting the opposition she faced from conservative church groups. Leitis In Waiting was presented at the Documentary Edge Festival's DOC Pitch Competition 2017 as a project-in-development.

Hamer has explained that discussion of LGBT issues in Tonga are often dominated by outside voices from countries like Australia, and that part of the motivation for making the film was to raise the profile of Tongan voices. He has also cited the continued existence of anti-sodomy laws as an important part of the discussion. “Colonial era laws are still on the books in eight Pacific countries. We want to bring more awareness to these issues across the Commonwealth.” Leitis in Waiting would later have its European premiere at the inaugural Festival of Commonwealth Film.

According to Mataele, the film is a means of speaking plainly and directly to decision makers:

I’ve always wanted to have a document of the work that we do. This film can help us advocate and make our voices heard internationally. There’s no substitute for putting your story out there without concealment. We’re telling it like it is.

The filmmakers employed an unusual release strategy. Alongside major festival screenings, they screened the film across the Pacific and worked with Pacific LGBT groups to create advocacy events, where the film screening was a means to gather people and resources in different communities.

The film was produced in association with Pacific Islanders in Communications and was broadcast on PBS television.

== Reception and viewing link ==
Leitis in Waiting and Lady Eva were screened at over 50 film festivals worldwide, including Margaret Mead Film Festival, AFI Docs, LA Film Festival, Doc Edge, Frameline, Outfest, Melbourne Queer Film Festival and Shanghai Queer Film Festival. The feature won the 2018 Audience Award at Festival of Commonwealth Film and Special Jury Prize at FIFO Tahiti while the short won the Asia Pacific Queer Film Festival Alliance (APQFFA) Award. Leitis in Waiting was nominated for the 2019 GLAAD Media Award for Outstanding Documentary.

The complete film can be viewed for free on the producersʻ Vimeo site: https://vimeo.com/268130098?share=copy&fl=sv&fe=ci
