= KUMU =

KUMU may refer to:

- KUMU (museum), an art museum in Estonia
- KHKA, a radio station (1500 AM) licensed to Honolulu, Hawaii, United States formerly known as KUMU
- KUMU-FM, a radio station (94.7 FM) licensed to Honolulu, Hawaii, United States
- Kumu (social network), a mobile social networking service in the Philippines
- Kumu (Data Visualisation Tool), a web-based data visualization tool for tracking and visualizing relationships
- Kumu (Dual! Parallel Trouble Adventure), an evil alien entity in the anime Dual! Parallel Trouble Adventure
- Kumu (Halau School or Studio), a hula master, or master teacher, at a (Hawaiian) halau (school) or studio
- Kumu Drums, a custom drum manufacturer in Hämeenlinna, Finland
- Kuusankosken Kumu, a football club disestablished in 1992, from Kuusankoski, Finland
