= Patrick Makuakāne =

- Born: Honolulu, Hawaiʻi
- Awards: 2023 MacArthur Fellow
- Website: https://naleihulu.org

Patrick Makuakāne (born 1961) is a Hawaiian dancer, chanter, kumu hula and cultural preservationist. In 2023 Makukāne was received a MacArthur Award, colloquially known as the "genius grant." He is the founder of the dance company Nā Lei Hulu i ka Wēkiu.

== Career ==
In 1985, he founded a company of dancers, known as Nā Lei Hulu i ka Wēkiu in San Francisco.

The company's style blends traditional movements with non-Hawaiian music like opera, electronic, dance, alternative, and pop. The company's stage productions showcase both hula mua and authentic, traditional pieces.

He frequently incorporates English-language lyrics, popular music, and modern attire and theatrical presentations. His extended narrative performances challenge stereotypes and delve into both historical and contemporary threats to Native Hawaiian people and culture. The Natives Are Restless (1996) examined the history of colonialism and the ongoing occupation of Hawai’i, highlighting the overthrow of the Hawaiian Kingdom and the push for sovereignty by Native Hawaiians. “Salva Mea,” a frenetic, communal dance set to progressive house music, illustrates the damage caused by Christian missionaries in the nineteenth century.

The creation and performances of The Natives Are Restless were documented in Constance Hale's 2016 book of the same name.

In 2000, he began intensive traditional studies with hula master Mae Kamāmalu Klein in Hawai‘i and, after three years, achieved the recognized status of kumu hula. This achievement culminated in a traditional ‘uniki ‘ailolo graduation ceremony, connecting Makuakāne to a hula lineage stretching back for generations.

Makuakāne is dedicated to preserving Hawaiian language, history, and culture through his choreography and hālau (school), which provides classes for both adults and children. He was inspired to create Ka Leo Kānaka, The Voice of the People, in 2013 after his hālau participated in a project aimed at digitizing Hawaiian-language newspapers. Nā Lei Hulu transcribed more than 1,200 pages, securing a first-place position. Makuakāne considers this as one of the most important achievements of the hālau. This work narrates stories from twentieth-century Hawai’i, set to a variety of musical genres from that era.

In 2022, Makuakāne and his company collaborated with Hawaiian transgender artists to produce the full-length piece MĀHŪ. In 2025, he wrote and directed The Return of Kapaemahu, a hula based on the animated film telling of the moʻolelo of four māhū who brought the healing arts from Tahiti to Hawaiʻi. This piece was performed weekly on the Waikīkī Beach hula mound adjacent to the Kapaemahu stones as part of the Lei Pua Ala Queer Histories of Hawaiʻi project.

Makuakāne has performed numerous times at the Burning Man festival.

Alongside his role as a kumu hula at his school, Makuakāne also acts as a spiritual and cultural advisor for the Native Hawaiian Religious Group at San Quentin Rehabilitation Center.

He directs the upcoming Hawaiian language opera Kamalehua: The Sheltering Tree based on the story of Haʻalilio's service under Kamehameha III for the Hawaii Opera Theatre, the opera opens in the Neal S. Blaisdell Concert Hall in May 2026.

== Awards and honors ==
- 2018 - lifetime of achievement by the San Francisco Arts Commission's Legacy Award
- 2019 - received a Dance/USA Fellowship for his emphasis on dance for social change
- 2020 - recipient of the Hewlett 50 Arts Commission, supporting the creation and premier of 50 exceptional works by world-class artists
- 2023 - MacArthur Fellows Program recipient

He was featured on the podcast This Is Love, on the episode "Hula with Teeth".
