= Na Lei Hulu I Ka Wekiu =

Hawaiian dance company and school

Nā Lei Hulu I Ka Wēkiu is a Hawaiian dance company or hālau hula led by kumu hula (hula master) Patrick Makuakāne.

Makuakāne founded Nā Lei Hulu in San Francisco in 1985. As a young dancer in Hawai'i, he trained under kumu hula Robert Cazimero, a member of the musical duo The Brothers Cazimero. In 2003, Makuakāne completed intensive traditional hula training under Mae Kamāmalu Klein and earned the title of kumu hula.

The dance company of about 25 women and 15 men has performed in many locations around the United States, including New York City, New Orleans, Honolulu, San Francisco, and Napa. The hālau also offers hula classes to beginning and intermediate level dancers.

What makes Nā Lei Hulu different from other hula hālau is Makuakāne's trademark style, called hula mua, or "hula that evolves." Hula mua consists of classic or hula-inspired movements set to non-Hawaiian music such as techno, pop, opera, Spanish, hip-hop, and disco. The group's shows typically feature a combination of both hula mua and traditional hula.

According to arts critic George Heymont of The Huffington Post, Makuakāne has "strength as a showman and choreographer with a keen artistic vision" and the group's performances are "wondrously rich in costume, song, and Hawaiian history."

Makuakāne and his hālau were profiled in the PBS documentary film American Aloha: Hula Beyond Hawai'i, originally broadcast in 2003.
