= Māhū =

People of dual male and female spirit in traditional Hawaiian and Tahitian cultures

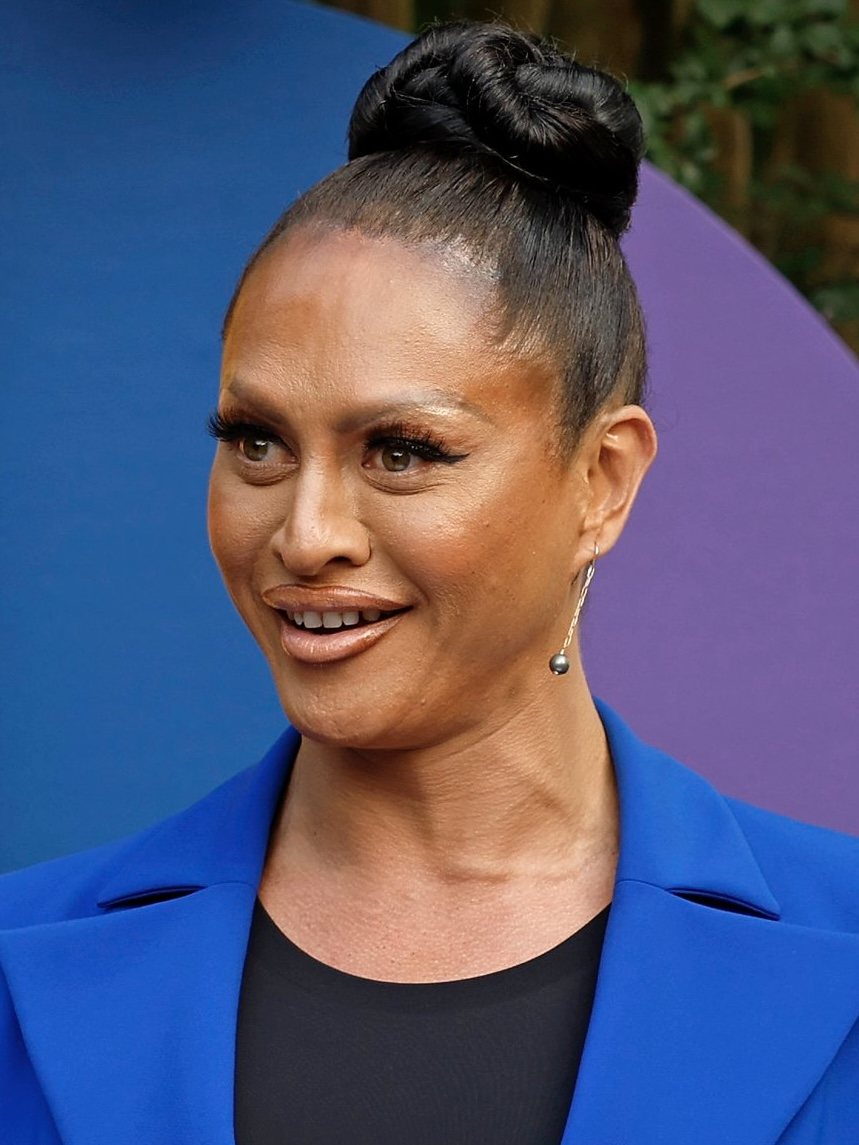
Sasha Colby, a māhū woman.

Māhū in Native Hawaiian and Tahitian cultures are people who embody both male and female spirit. They have traditional spiritual and social roles within the culture, similar to Tongan fakaleiti and Samoan fa'afafine. The terms “third gender” and “in the middle” have been used to help explain māhū in the English language.

According to present-day māhū kumu hula Kaua'i Iki:

Māhū were particularly respected as teachers, usually of hula dance and chant. In pre-contact times māhū performed the roles of goddesses in hula dances that took place in temples which were off-limits to women. Māhū were also valued as the keepers of cultural traditions, such as the passing down of genealogies. Traditionally parents would ask māhū to name their children.

Historically, māhū was a respectful term for people, but with colonization the word was denigrated and used as an insult to refer to homosexuals. More recently, there has been an effort to recapture the original dignity and respect accorded the term māhū.

== History ==
In the pre-colonial history of Hawai'i, māhū were notable healers, although much of this history was elided through the intervention of Christian missionaries. According to Joan Roughgarden, the māhū lacked access to political power, were unable to aspire to leadership roles, and "Perceived as always available for sexual conquest by men." The first published description of māhū occurs in Captain William Bligh's logbook of the Bounty, which stopped in Tahiti in 1789, where he was introduced to a member of a "class of people very common in Otaheitie called Mahoo... who although I was certain was a man, had great marks of effeminacy about him."

A surviving monument to this history is the Healer Stones of Kapaemāhū on Waikiki Beach, which commemorate four important māhū who first brought the healing arts from Tahiti to Hawaiʻi. These are referred to by Hawaiian historian Mary Kawena Pukui as pae māhū, or literally a row of māhū. The term māhū is misleadingly defined in Pukui and Ebert's Hawaiian dictionary as "n. Homosexual, of either sex; hermaphrodite." The assumption of same-sex behavior reflects the conflation of gender and sexuality that was common at that time. (Note: The term "transgender" was not in use yet during the time the earliest sources were written, and has undergone significant changes in definition over time. While technically coined in the 1960s, the term transgender was rarely published until the 1990s and did not see wide usage until the 2000s.) The idea that māhū are biological mosaics appears to be a misunderstanding of the term hermaphrodite (now known as intersex), which in early publications by sexologists and anthropologists was used generally to mean "an individual which has the attributes of both male and female;" this led to homosexual, bisexual, and gender nonconforming individuals being mislabeled as "hermaphrodites" in the medical literature. The history of Kapaemahu was revived through an animated film, a picture book, and a museum exhibition at the Bishop Museum.

In 1891, when painter Paul Gauguin first came to Tahiti, he was thought to be a māhū by the indigenous people, due to his flamboyant manner of dress during that time. His 1893 painting Papa Moe (Mysterious Water) depicts a māhū drinking from a small waterfall.

Missionaries to Hawai'i introduced biblical laws to the islands in the 1820s; under their influence, Hawai'i's first anti-sodomy law was passed in 1850. These laws led to the social stigmatization of the māhū in Hawai'i. Beginning in the mid-1960s, the Honolulu City Council required trans women to wear a badge identifying themselves as male.

In American artist George Biddle's Tahitian Journal (1920–1922) he writes about several māhū friends in Tahiti, of their role in native Tahitian society, and of the persecution of a māhū friend Naipu, who fled Tahiti due to colonial French laws that sent māhū and homosexuals to hard labor in prison in New Caledonia. Rae rae is a social category of māhū that came into use in Tahiti in the 1960s, although it is criticized by some māhū as an abject reference to sex.

== In contemporary cultures ==
In the 1980s, māhū and fa'afafine of Samoa began organizing, as māhū. In 2021, a group of Kānaka Maoli formed a subgroup of the Hawaiʻi LGBT Legacy Foundation called the māhūi that developed a ceremony to open Honolulu Pride month at the Kapaemahu monument in Waikīkī, now repeated every October.

In 2003, the term mahuwahine was coined within Hawaii's queer community: māhū (in the middle) + wahine (woman), the structure of the word is similar to Samoan fa'a (the way of) + fafine (woman/wife). The term mahuwahine resembles a transgender identity that coincides with Hawaiian cultural renaissance. The corresponding term is mahukane (māhū + kane (man)). However, in contemporary usage, māhū is used for all genders.

Notable contemporary māhū, or mahuwahine, include activist and kumu hula Hinaleimoana Kwai Kong Wong-Kalu, kumu hula Kaumakaiwa Kanaka'ole, and kumu hula Kaua'i Iki; and within the wider māhū LGBTQ+ community, historian Noenoe Silva, activist Ku‘u-mealoha Gomes, singer and painter Bobby Holcomb, and singer Kealii Reichel.

In many traditional communities, māhū play an important role in carrying on Polynesian culture, and teaching "the balance of female and male throughout creation". Modern māhū carry on traditions of connection to the land, language preservation, and the preservation and revival of cultural activities including traditional dances, songs, and the methods of playing culturally-specific musical instruments. Symbolic tattooing is also a popular practice. Modern māhū do not alter their bodies through what others would consider gender reassignment surgery, but, just as any person in Hawaiian/Tahitian society, dress differently for work, home, and nights out.

Strong familial relationships are important in māhū culture, as kinship bonds within all of Hawaiian/Tahitian cultures are essential to family survival. When possible, the māhū maintain solid relationships with their families of origin, often by becoming foster parents to nieces and nephews, and have been noted for being especially "compassionate and creative". This ability to bring up children is considered a special skill specific to māhū people. Māhū also contribute to their extended families and communities through the gathering and maintaining of knowledge, and the practicing and teaching of hula traditions, which are traditionally handed down through women.

In situations where they have been rejected by their families of origin, due to homophobia and colonization, māhū have formed their own communities, supporting one another, and preserving and teaching cultural traditions to the next generations. In the documentary Kumu Hina, Hinaleimoana Wong-Kalu visits one of these communities of elders up in the mountains, and meets with some of the māhū who were her teachers and chosen family when she was young.

== See also ==
- Hinaleimoana Wong-Kalu – contemporary māhū, teacher and Hawaiian cultural worker
  - Kumu Hina (2014) – documentary film about Hinaleimoana Wong-Kalu
- Kapaemahu - cultural monument in Hawaiʻi
- LGBT rights in Hawaii
- Rae-rae
- Fa’afafine, similar group in Samoa and American Samoa
- Bakla, similar third gender concept in the Philippines
- Bissu, similar third gender concept among the Bugis people of Indonesia
- Two-spirit, a pan-Indigenous umbrella term for all traditional Native American identities that do not fit into the Western gender binary or heterosexual roles

== References and sources ==
- Eisenman, Stephen F., (1999). Gauguin's Skirt. London: Thames and Hudson. ISBN 978-0500280386.
- Matzner, Andrew (2001). O Au No Keia: Voices from Hawai'i's Mahu and Transgender Communities
