= Xq28 =

Genetic marker at the lower tip of human X chromosome

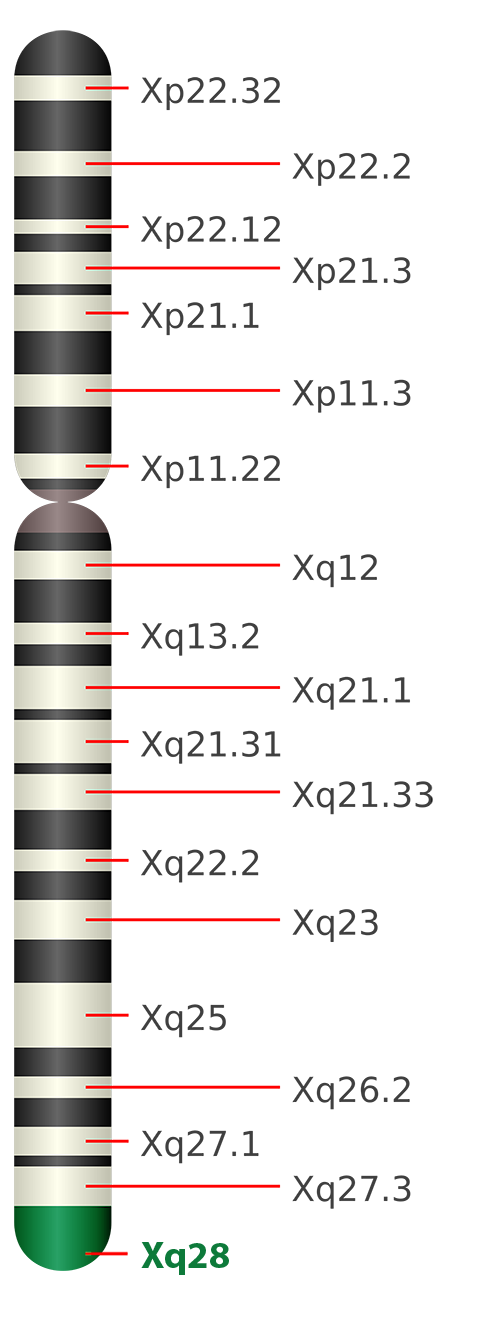
The human X chromosome with Xq28 (green) located at the tip of the long arm of the chromosome. Studies of the X chromosome as well as the entire human genome have linked Xq28 to the heredity of homosexuality in human males.

Xq28 is a chromosome band and genetic marker situated at the tip of the X chromosome which has been studied since at least 1980. The band contains three distinct regions, totaling about 8 Mbp of genetic information. The marker came to the public eye in 1993 when studies by Dean Hamer and others indicated a link between the Xq28 marker and male sexual orientation.

== Initial linkage ==
The 1993 study by Hamer et al. examined 114 families of gay men in the United States and found increased rates of homosexuality among maternal uncles and cousins, but not among paternal relatives. This pattern of inheritance suggested that there might be linked genes on the X chromosome, since males always inherit their copy of the X chromosome from their mothers. Polymorphisms of genetic markers of the X chromosome were analyzed for 40 families to see if a specific marker was shared by a disproportionate amount of brothers who were both gay. The results showed that among gay brothers, the concordance rate for markers from the Xq28 region were significantly greater than expected for random Mendelian segregation, indicating that a link did exist in that small sample. It was concluded that at least one form of male homosexuality is preferentially transmitted through the maternal side and is genetically linked to the Xq28 region.

A follow-up study, Hu et al. (1995), conducted by the Hamer lab in collaboration with two groups of statistical experts in 1995, corroborated the original results for males with homosexual brothers sharing Xq28 at significantly elevated rates. This study also included heterosexual brothers, who showed significantly less than expected sharing of the Xq28 region, as expected for a genetic locus that in one form is associated with same-sex attraction and in another form is associated with opposite-sex attraction. In this study no link to Xq28 was found among homosexual females, indicating a different genetic pathway as for most sex-specific phenotypes.

Hamer's findings were highlighted in scientific journals including Science, Nature and the topic of a mini-symposium in Scientific American.

=== Controversy ===
In June 1994, an article in the Chicago Tribune by John Crewdson stated that an anonymous junior researcher in Hamer's laboratory alleged that Hamer selectively presented the data in his 1993 paper in the journal "Science". The junior researcher had assisted in the gene mapping in Hamer's 1993 study. Shortly after voicing her questions, she was summarily dismissed from her post-doctoral fellowship in Hamer's lab; who dismissed her could not be determined. Later, she was given another position in a different lab. Hamer stated that Crewdson's article was "seriously in error" and denied the allegations made against him. An official inquiry launched by the Office of Research Integrity (ORI) to investigate the allegations of selective presentation of the data ended in December 1996. It determined that Hamer had not committed any scientific misconduct in his study.

== Subsequent studies ==
Two further studies in the 1990s gave mixed results. One was an X chromosome linkage analysis of 54 pairs of gay brothers carried out by the independent research group of Sanders et al. in 1998. The results of the study were indistinguishable from the results of the study by Hu et al.: both reported that the chromosomal location of maximum sharing was locus DXS1108 and both reported similar degrees of allele sharing (66% versus 67%). The second study by Rice et al. in 1999 studied 52 pairs of Canadian gay brothers and found no statistically significant (Note: The linkage analysis by Rice et al. (1999) did report that gay brothers shared approximately 46% of their alleles at the Xq28 region. However, this result was not statistically significant because to show that male sexual orientation is influenced by a gene (or genes) at Xq28 in a statistically significant manner, their linkage analysis needed to find that gay brothers share more than 50% of their alleles at the Xq28 region. In contrast, analyses by Hamer et al. (1993), Hu et al. (1995) and the 1998 study by Sanders et al. did find greater than 50% allele sharing at Xq28 in gay brothers, thus yielding statistically significant results.) linkage in alleles and haplotypes. Consequently, they concluded against the possibility of any gene in the Xq28 region having a large genetic influence on male sexual orientation (though they could not rule out the possibility of a gene in this region having a small influence). Rice et al. also asserted that their results do not exclude the possibility of finding male homosexuality genes elsewhere in the genome. Hamer criticized the study for not selecting families for their study population based on maternal transmission as selecting only families that show an excess of maternal gay relatives is necessary to detect the Xq28 linkage. A meta-analysis of all data available at that time (i.e., Hamer et al. (1993), Hu et al. (1995), Rice et al. (1999), and the unpublished 1998 study by Sanders et al. indicated that Xq28 has a significant but not exclusive role in male sexual orientation.

The authors of the meta-analysis (which included three authors of the Rice et al. study, Rice, Risch and Ebers) presented several methodological reasons due to which Rice et al. (1999) may have been unable to detect statistically significant linkage between Xq28 and male sexual orientation: the families genotyped by Rice et al. were non-representative as they had an excess of paternal instead of maternal gay relatives thus obscuring the display of any X-chromosome linkage; the statistical power of their sample was insufficient to adequately detect linkage (Note: There was a 35% chance that Rice et al. would not detect Xq28's linkage with homosexuality simply by chance.) and they lacked definite criteria for what constituted as homosexuality (the researchers depended on their own judgement and sometimes based their judgement on a single question to the subject). They also lacked criteria "to select appropriate families for the study of a putative X-linked locus" — as they did not select families based on the presence of maternal transmission of homosexuality, the Xq28 contribution to male sexual orientation may have been hidden. In addition, the meta-analysis revealed that the family pedigree data of Rice et al. (1999), in contrast to the genotyping data, seemed to support X chromosome linkage for homosexuality. (Note: Rice et al. did not include the family pedigree data in their April 1999 report, which described only the genotyping results for a subset of 48 families. The realization that the family pedigree data actually supported X chromosome linkage came later when the data was analysed during the meta-analysis published in August 1999.)

In 2012, a large, comprehensive genome-wide linkage study of male sexual orientation was conducted by several independent groups of researchers. The study population included 409 independent pairs of gay brothers from 384 families, who were analyzed with over 300,000 single-nucleotide polymorphism markers. The study confirmed the Xq28 linkage to homosexuality by two-point and multipoint (MERLIN) LOD score mapping. Significant linkage was also detected in the region near the centromere of chromosome 8, overlapping with one of the regions detected in a previous genomewide linkage study by the Hamer lab. The authors concluded that "our findings, taken in context with previous work, suggest that genetic variation in each of these regions contributes to development of the important psychological trait of male sexual orientation." It was the largest study of the genetic basis of homosexuality to date and was published online in November 2014.

In August 2019, a genome-wide association study of 493,001 individuals concluded that hundreds or thousands of genetic variants underlie homosexual behavior in both sexes, with 5 variants in particular being significantly associated. They stated that in contrast to linkage studies that found substantial association of sexual orientation with variants on the X-chromosome, they found no excess of signal (and no individual genome-wide significant variants) on Xq28 or the rest of the X chromosome.

== Other contents ==
Xq28 is a large, complex, and gene-dense region. Among its various genes are the 12 genes of the melanoma-associated antigen (MAGE) family, of which MAGEA11 has been identified as a coregulator for the androgen receptor. Mutations involving the production of extra copies of the MECP2 and IRAK1 genes within Xq28 have been associated with phenotypes including anxiety and autism in mice.

== See also ==
- Biology and sexual orientation
- Daily Mail#Gay gene controversy
- The Science of Desire
- Gender differences in suicide
