= Dean Hamer =

American geneticist (born 1951)

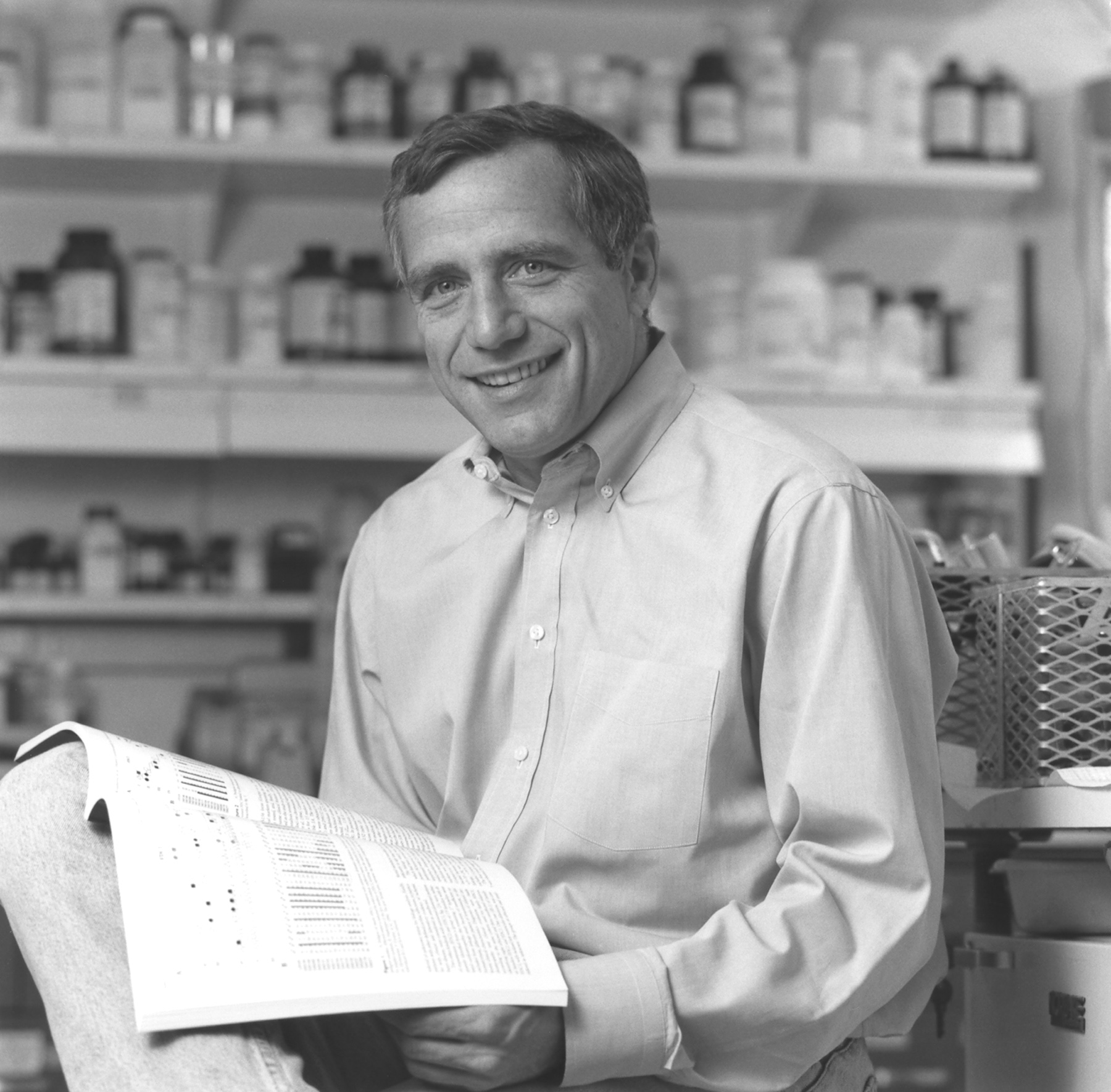
- Hamer in 1995
- Born: May 29, 1951 (age 75); Montclair, New Jersey, U.S.
- Education: Harvard Medical School
- Known for: Xq28, God gene, Out in the Silence
- Scientific career
- Fields: Genetics, documentary film
- Workplaces: National Institutes of Health, Sundance Institute

Dean Hamer (/ˈheɪmər/; born May 29, 1951) is an American geneticist, author, and filmmaker. He is known for his research on the role of genetics in sexual orientation and for a series of popular books and films that have changed scientific and public understandings and perceptions of human sexuality and gender.

== Education and career ==
Born in Montclair, New Jersey, Hamer obtained his BA at Trinity College in Connecticut, and his PhD from Harvard Medical School. He was an independent researcher at the National Institutes of Health for 35 years, where he was the Chief of Gene Structure and Regulation Section at the U.S. National Cancer Institute; upon retirement in 2011 he was designated Scientist Emeritus. Hamer has won numerous awards including the Trinity College Thompson History Prize, Maryland Distinguished Young Scientist Award, Ariens Kappers Award for Neurobiology, New York Times book-of-the year author, and an Emmy Award.

== Biotechnology research ==
Hamer invented the first method for introducing new genes into animal cells using SV40 vectors while a graduate student at Harvard Medical School. This approach was used to produce a variety of biomedical products including human growth hormone and a vaccine for Hepatitis B, resulting in 4 US patents.

At NIH, Hamerʻs lab initially focused on the metallothionein gene system. They elucidated the mechanism of induction of yeast metallothionein by copper ions, one of the first eukaryotic gene regulatory systems to be understood at the molecular level and a useful method for regulating therapeutic protein production.

== Human sexual orientation and behavior genetics ==
In the 1990s Hamer began studies on the genetics of human behavior, which led to the first molecular evidence for genes that influence human sexual orientation. His research group's first paper, published in Science in 1993, reported that the maternal but not paternal male relatives of gay men had increased rates of same-sex orientation, suggesting the possibility of sex-linked transmission in a portion of the population. A genetic linkage analysis of DNA samples from these families showed that gay brothers had an increased probability of sharing polymorphic markers on the subtelomeric region of the long arm of the X chromosome, Xq28, providing statistically significant evidence for linkage to the sexual orientation phenotype. This finding was replicated in two other studies in the United States whereas a study in Canada found contrary results; meta-analysis of all data available at that time suggested that Xq28 has a significant but not exclusive effect. Subsequently, a genomewide scan by Hamerʻs group revealed additional regions on autosomes that were moderately linked to male sexual orientation.

Hamer's results were supported in 2014 in a large, multi-center genetic linkage study of male sexual orientation. This study's analysis of 409 pairs of gay brothers with over 300,000 single-nucleotide polymorphism markers confirmed the Xq28 linkage by two-point and multipoint LOD score mapping. Significant linkage was also detected in the pericentromeric region of chromosome 8, overlapping with one of the regions detected in the Hamer lab's previous genomewide study. The authors concluded, "Results, especially in the context of past studies, support the existence of genes on pericentromeric chromosome 8 and chromosome Xq28 influencing development of male sexual orientation."

In 2019, a genome-wide association study of 493,001 individuals concluded that hundreds or thousands of genetic variants underlie same-sex sexual behavior in both sexes, but in contrast to linkage studies they found no excess of signal on Xq28 or the rest of the X chromosome. This study was questioned on account of its reliance on a dichotomous ever/never measure that lumped together predominantly heterosexual, bisexual and homosexual individuals, including those who only experimented once with a same-sex partner, possibly resulting in misleading associations to personality traits. Hamer said that the findings of the 2019 study do not reveal any biological pathways for sexual orientation, but stated he hoped it would be the first of many to come.

Hamer's findings provoked extensive public reaction, often based on misunderstanding of the science, which led to his interest in explaining the data to a wide audience through a book written in collaboration with a journalist. A 2016 article "Sexual Orientation, Controversy, and Science" includes a review of molecular genetics studies related to sexuality, starting with Hamer's work. The article cites the attempts to replicate Hamer's work, some supportive and some not. It concludes, "Although it is encouraging that the largest study replicated some findings from smaller studies, the case is not closed. Still larger studies are needed to provide the degree of certainty now expected in molecular genetics, and in any case, the mapping case is not closed in molecular genetics until one has identified the genes that affect a trait."

Hamer and colleagues also investigated the genetic roots of anxiety and found that a promoter region polymorphism in the gene for the serotonin transporter, which is the target of antidepressant drugs such as Prozac, is associated with mood and personality. This finding has been extensively replicated and extended and its activity has been confirmed by direct brain imaging studies.

In 2004, Hamer used data from ongoing behavioral genetics studies in his lab to explore the possibility of genetic influences on spirituality. In The God Gene: How Faith is Hardwired into our Genes, he proposed that a quantitative measure of self-transcendence is partially heritable and may be correlated to a specific gene, VMAT2, involved in monamine metabolism. Hamer's speculations on the possible role of genetics in religious experience were featured in a cover story in Time magazine.

== HIV/AIDS treatment and prevention ==
Hamer's lab developed several biotechnological strategies to treat and reduce the transmission of HIV/AIDS. As a means to reduce the latent pools of virus responsible for viral persistence, they discovered novel chemical agent to induce integrated virus, and molecularly-engineered immunotoxins to destroy the infected cells. They also collaborated with Osel, Inc. on a novel "live microbial microbicide" approach to HIV/AIDS prevention. By genetically engineering normal vaginal bacteria to produce a potent anti-HIV peptide, significant protection against viral infection was provided in a durable and obtainable fashion for up to one month. The methodology was shown to be applicable to both rectal and vaginal use and is in the initial stages of preclinical testing.

== Films and media ==
Hamer turned to documentary filmmaking to address complex scientific and social issues often overlooked by the mainstream media. In 2005, he and partner Joe Wilson formed Qwaves with the mission of producing "insightful and provocative films that emanate from the voices of those on the outside and compel us to question and to act." Their short films won multiple awards including winner of the PBS Independent Lens Shorts Festival and Seeds of Tolerance Award.

Out in the Silence, the first feature film from Qwaves, documented the controversy that was ignited by Hamer and Wilson's wedding announcement in Wilson's conservative small hometown in Pennsylvania The film was supported by the Sundance Documentary Film Program and won an Emmy Award for achievement in documentary. The Out in the Silence Youth Activism Award was initiated in 2011 to highlight the contributions of young people to achieving respect, inclusion and equality for lesbian, gay, bisexual and transgender people.

In 2011, Hamer and Wilson moved to Hawaiʻi to begin a series of films about Pacific Islander lives and voices and long tradition of acceptance of sexual and gender minorities. Their feature documentary Kumu Hina, about transgender native Hawaiian teacher and cultural icon Hinaleimoana Wong-Kalu, was supported by ITVS, Pacific Islanders in Communications and the Ford Foundation and won the GLAAD Media Award for Outstanding Documentary and the Independent Lens Audience Award on PBS

In 2017, Hamer and Wilson, with Hinaleimoana Wong-Kalu as producer, released Leitis in Waiting and Lady Eva, which documented the lives of transgender women in the conservative South Pacific Kingdom of Tonga.This was followed in 2019 by The Rogers, about transgender men in Samoa. These films became part of a campaign to decriminalize same-sex relationships across the Pacific.

Hamer, Wilson and Wong-Kalu continued their collaboration in 2020 with the animated short film Kapaemahu, based on the hidden history of four stones on Waikiki Beach placed there as a tribute to four legendary mahu who first brought the healing arts from Tahiti to Hawaii. It premiered and won the Special Jury Prize at the Tribeca Film Festival and was shortlisted for an Oscar as Best Animated Short Film at the 93rd Academy Awards. The animated film was followed by a children's book published by Kokila, a PBS feature documentary, a multimedia exhibition at the Bishop Museum, permanent display at the Hawaiʻi Convention center, and inclusion in new interpretative signage at the Kapaemahu monument in Waikiki.

The team's most recent film is Aikane, an animated short based on the Hawaiian term for intimate friends of the same sex. It won two Academy Award-qualifying film festival awards and was nationally distributed by Conde Nast on the Them platform.

In 2024, Hamer initiated a multimedia community engagement and storytelling effort on the "Queer Histories of Hawaiʻi." Funded by the Mellon Foundation, the project aims to document and memorialize gender and sexual diversity across the multicultural landscape of the Hawaiian islands.

Hamer is a frequent guest on TV documentaries and news shows including Good Morning America, Nightline and The Oprah Winfrey Show. He is featured in the Barbara Walters' special Heaven and Bill Maher documentary Religulous, and has been profiled in Time magazine.

== Scholarly influence ==
According to Google Scholar, Hamer's works have been cited over 33,000 times and he has an h-index of 72 as of August 2020.

== Books ==
- The Science of Desire: The Search for the Gay Gene and the Biology of Behavior (Simon and Schuster, 1994) ISBN 0-684-80446-8
- Living with Our Genes: Why They Matter More Than You Think with Peter Copeland (Anchor, 1999) ISBN 0-385-48584-0
- The God Gene: How Faith Is Hardwired into our Genes (Doubleday, 2004) ISBN 0-385-50058-0

== Films ==
- Out in the Silence (Dir Joe Wilson, Dean Hamer, 2009). WPSU website
- Kumu Hina" (Dir. Dean Hamer, Joe Wilson, 2014). PBS website
- Leitis in Waiting (Dir Dean Hamer, Joe Wilson, Prod Hinaleimoana Wong-Kalu, 2018). PBS website
- Kapaemahu (Dir Hinaleimoana Wong-Kalu, Dean Hamer, Joe Wilson, 2020). Kanak Pakipika website

== See also ==
- Biology and sexual orientation
- Serotonin transporter
