= Kapaemahu (film) =

2020 American animated short film

- Directed by: Hinaleimoana Wong-Kalu; Dean Hamer; Joe Wilson; Daniel Sousa (Animation Director)
- Written by: Dean Hamer
- Produced by: Hinaleimoana Wong-Kalu; Dean Hamer; Joe Wilson
- Music by: Dan Golden; Kaumakaiwa Kanakole (Chant)
- Animation by: Daniel Sousa
- Production companies: Kanaka Pakipika; Pacific Islanders in Communications
- Release date: April 18, 2020
- Running time: 8 min
- Country: United States
- Language: Hawaiian (Niʻihau dialect)

Kapaemahu is a 2020 animated short film produced and directed by Hinaleimoana Wong-Kalu, Dean Hamer and Joe Wilson with director of the animation Daniel Sousa. It is based on the long-hidden history of four healing stones on Waikiki Beach placed there as a tribute to four legendary mahu who first brought the healing arts to Hawaii. The film is narrated in Olelo Niihau, the only unbroken form of the Hawaiian language. Kapaemahu premiered at the Tribeca Film Festival, was screened in over 160 film festivals and 200 theaters worldwide, won multiple Oscar-qualifying jury awards, and was shortlisted for Best Animated Short Film at the 93rd Academy Awards®.

== Production ==
The film was conceived in 2010 when Wong-Kalu introduced Hamer and Wilson to the stones of Kapaemahu, which she had known since childhood, while they were filming her in Waikīkī for the documentary Kumu Hina. Recognizing the potential of the site to act as a monument to Hawaiian concepts of healing and gender diversity, the team began researching the history of the stones, which had long been hidden from the public. This led to Hamer's discovery of the first recorded version of the oral tradition, a handwritten manuscript in the archives of the University of Hawai'i that became the basis for the film script. It was decided to narrate the film in Olelo Niihau, which is the only form of Hawaiian spoken continuously since prior to Western contact and closest to the language that would have been spoken by the healers. Sousa developed a hand-painted art style and palette for the project that is rooted in the Polynesian art forms of tapa making and lauhala weaving.

== Release and Reception ==
The film world premiered at the 2020 Tribeca Film Festival, where it was awarded the Special Jury Mention. It received favorable reviews from several critics. Sharmindrila Paul of AnimationXpress wrote “ The film looks like poetry in motion. The animation technique is unique and evokes a feeling of witnessing the legend and its history in person”. It was characterized by Animation Magazine as “a vivid animation seen through the eyes of a child," by Filmmaker Magazine as a "rich standout," by Zippy Frames as a "thoughtful film about connecting the past to the future, inviting understanding, and executed in a uniquely empathetic way," and by IndieWire as "a transgender, Hawaiian breakthrough."

== Book, Documentary, Exhibition, Hula, and Monument ==
The animated film was used as the basis for a children's picture book called Kapaemahu published by Penguin Random House. It was also used as the primary storytelling device for the moolelo in a PBS documentary film and an immersive multimedia exhibition at the Bishop Museum, both titled The Healer Stones of Kapaemahu. In 2023, the animated film was incorporated into the commemorative landscape of Hawaii through a permanent display about the stones at the Hawaii Convention Center and new interpretive signage at the Kapaemahu monument in Waikiki, both of which use the animated film as the storytelling device for the moolelo. In 2025 a hula show based on the story, The Return of Kapaemahu, was written and directed by Kumu Patrick Makuakāne and performed on the Kūhiō Beach hula mound, close to the current location of the stones.

== Selections and awards ==
Year	Festival	Location	Award/Category
2020	Tribeca Film Festival	New York City, NY	Special Jury Mention
2020	Animayo International Film Festival	Canary Islands, Spain	Grand Jury Prize
2020	Atlanta Film Festival	Atlanta, GA	Best Animated Short
2020	Foyle Film Festival	Derry, Northern Ireland	Best Animated Short
2020	Hiroshima International Animation Festival	Hiroshima, Japan	Special Jury Prize
2020	Nashville Film Festival	Nashville, TN	Audience Award
2020	Outfest Los Angeles LGBT Film Festival	Los Angeles, CA	Audience Award
2020	Rhode Island International Film Festival	Providence, Rhode Island	Best Animation Short
2020	Chicago International Children's Film Festival	Chicago, Illinois	Children's Jury Best Animated Short
2020	imagineNATIVE	Toronto, Canada	Best Native Language Production
2020	Bengalaru International Short Film Festival	Bangalore, India	Best Animated Film
2020	Boston International Kids Film Festival	Boston, MA	Best Foreign Language Film
2020	New Zealand International Film Festival	Auckland, New Zealand	Special Jury Mention
2020	Annecy International Animated Film Festival	Annecy, France	Nominated City of Annecy Award
2020	Ottawa International Animation Film Festival	Ottawa, Canada	Nominated Best Children's Film
2020	Palm Springs International Short Fest	Palm Springs, California	Nominated Best LGBT Short
2020	Indy Shorts International Film Festival	Indianapolis, IN	Nominated Grand Prize
2020	Zlin International Film Festival for Children and Youth	Zlin, Czech Republic	Nominated Golden Slipper
2020	Melbourne International Film Festival	Melbourne, Australia	Nominated City of Melbourne Award
2021	93rd Academy Awards®	Los Angeles, CA	Shortlisted Best Animated Short Film
