= Hālau =

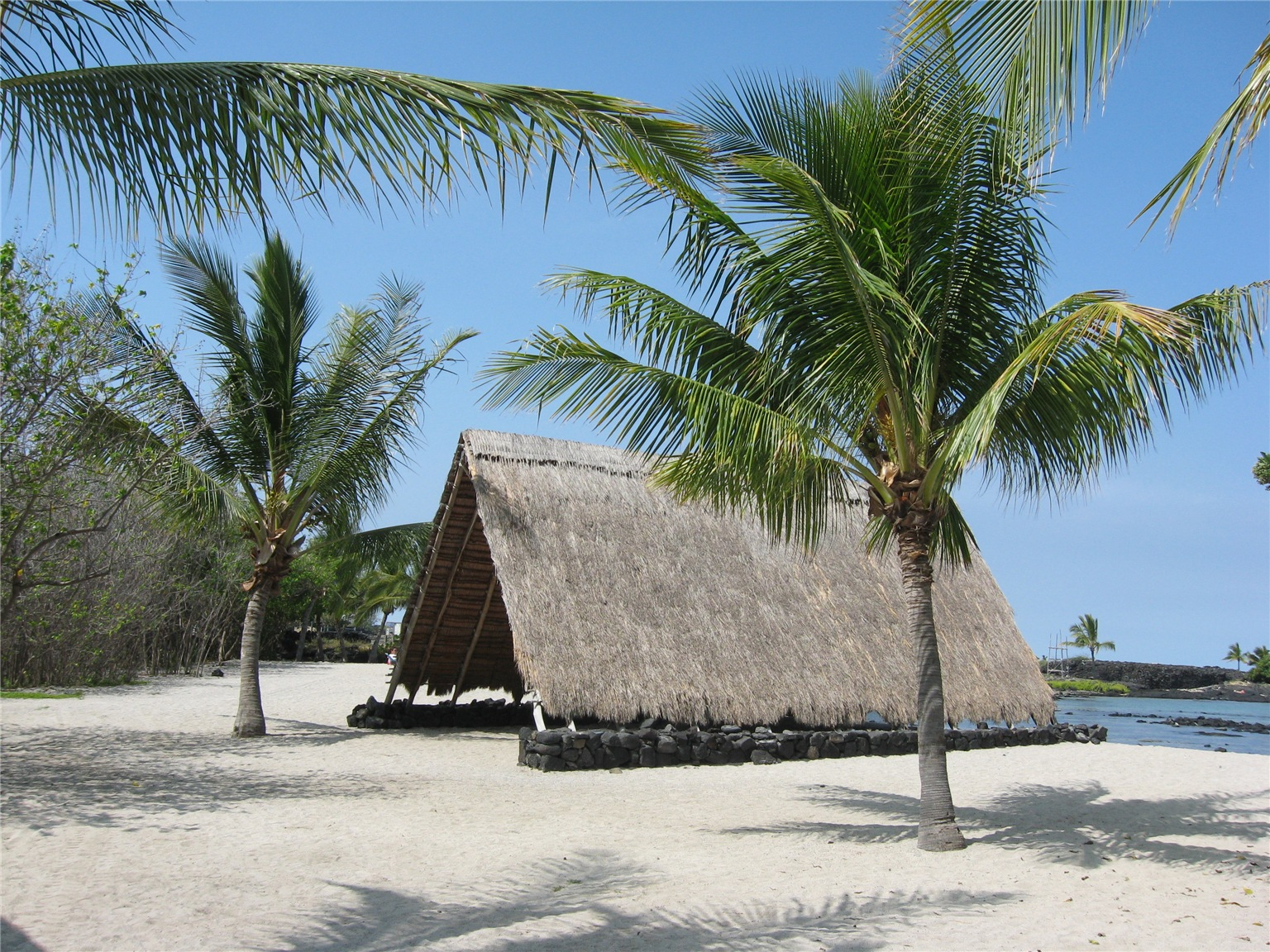
Hālau at Honokōhau park

A hālau is Hawaiian word meaning a school, academy, or group. Literally, the word means "a branch from which many leaves grow." Today a hālau usually describes a hula school (hālau hula).

The teacher at the hālau is the kumu hula, where kumu means source of knowledge, or literally just teacher. Often you will find that there is a hierarchy in hula schools - starting with the kumu (teacher), alaka'i (leader), kokua (helpers), and then the 'olapa (dancers) or haumana (students).

The word was also used for the long open-air houses, often constructed at the shores, where the instruction took place.

An example has been reconstructed at the Kaloko-Honokōhau National Historical Park.

A common Hawaiian adage is " ʻAʻohe pau ka ʻike i ka hālau hoʻokahi," which means, "All knowledge is not contained in only one school."
