= Hula =

Hawaiian traditional dance form

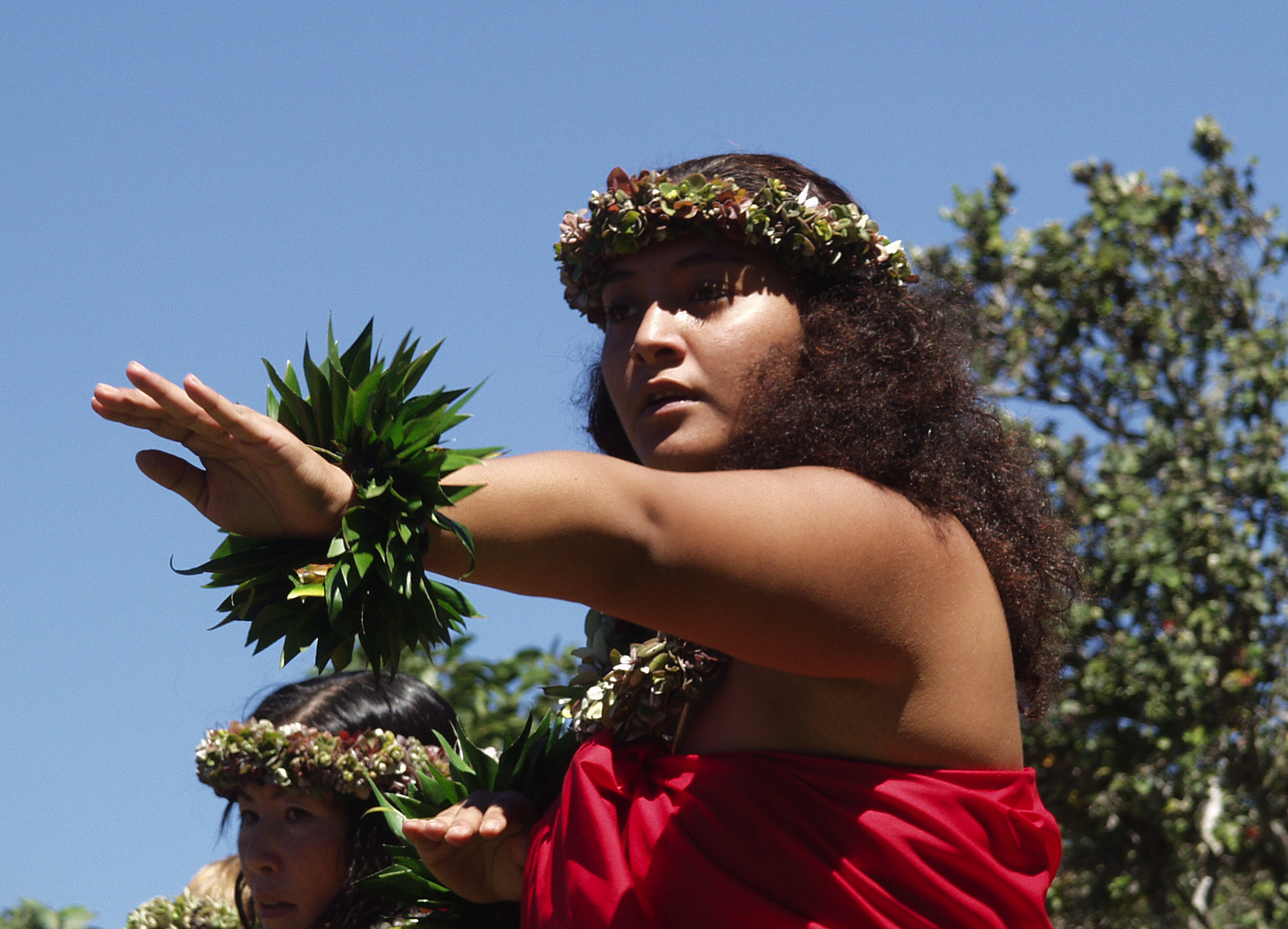
Hula kahiko performance in Hawaiʻi Volcanoes National Park

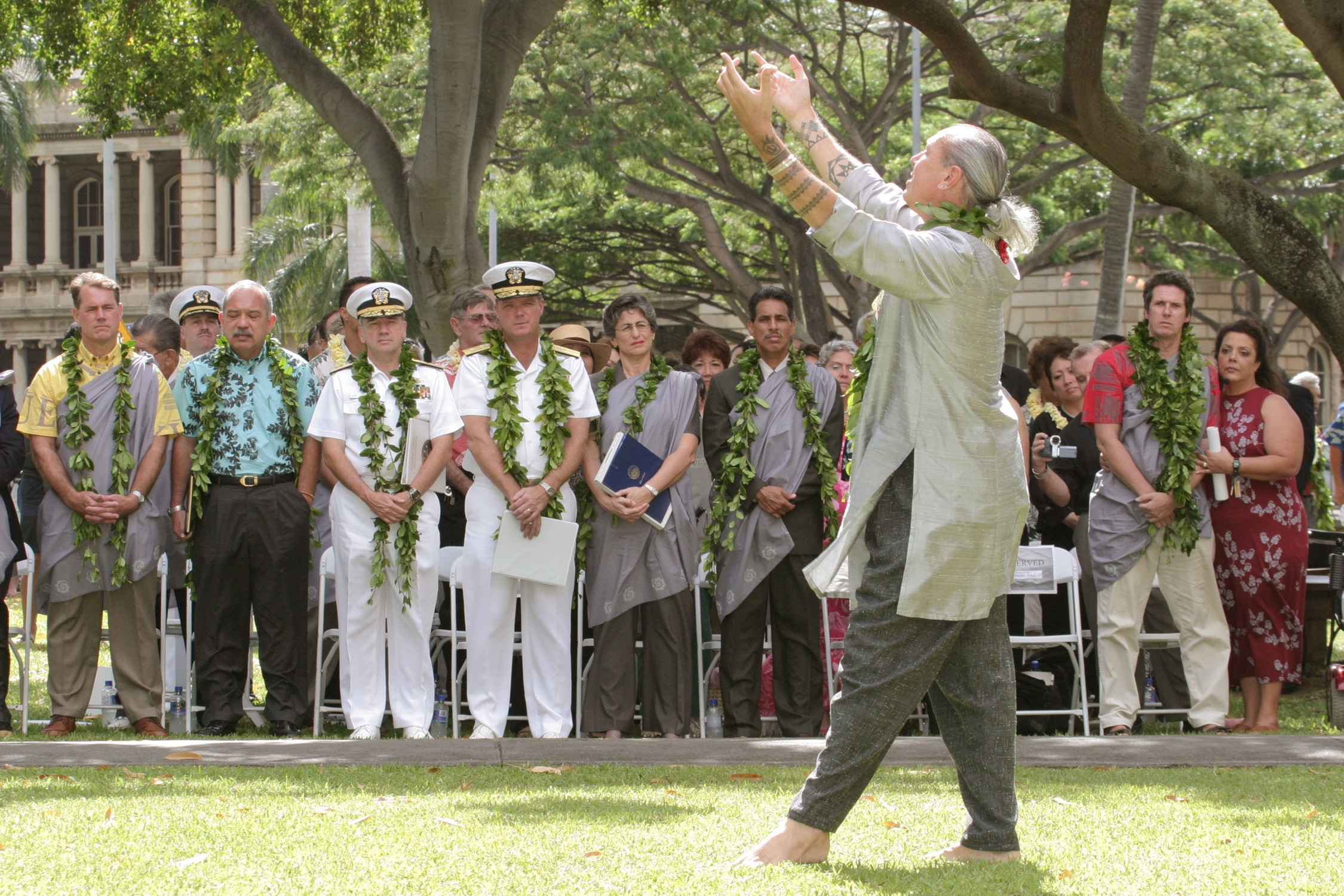
Hula in Hawaii. Kumu hula Frank Kawaikapuokalani Hewett performed at the ceremony marking the transfer of control over Kahoʻolawe from the U.S. Navy to the state.

Hula (/ˈhuːlə/) is a Hawaiian dance form expressing song (mele). It was developed in the Hawaiian Islands by the Native Hawaiians who settled there. The hula dramatizes or portrays the words of the mele in a visual dance form.

Hula survived through the colonization of Hawai’i, and was often secretly practiced.There are many sub-styles of hula, with the two main categories being hula ʻauana and hula kahiko. Ancient hula, performed before Western encounters with Hawaiʻi, is called kahiko. It is accompanied by chant and traditional instruments. Hula, as it evolved under Western influence in the 19th and 20th centuries, is called ʻauana (a word that means "to wander" or "drift"). It is accompanied by song and Western-influenced musical instruments such as the guitar, the ʻukulele, and the double bass.

Terminology for two additional categories is beginning to enter the hula lexicon: "Monarchy" includes any hula which were composed and choreographed during the 19th century. During that time the influx of Western culture created significant changes in the formal Hawaiian arts, including hula. "Ai Kahiko", meaning "in the ancient style" are those hula written in the 20th and 21st centuries that follow the stylistic protocols of the ancient hula kahiko.

There are also two main positions of a hula dance: either sitting (noho dance) or standing (luna dance). Some dances utilize both forms.

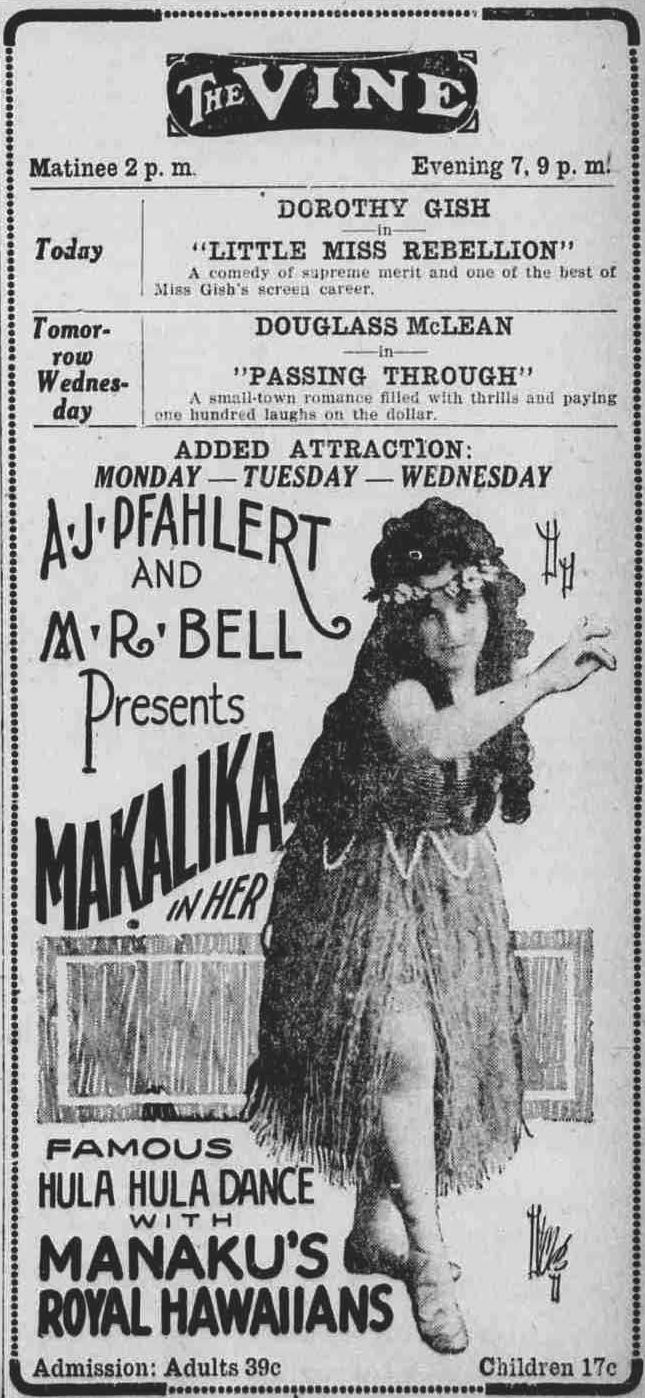
In the 1890s and early 1900s, hula dancers and Hawaiian musicians toured the U.S. mainland. This advertisement appeared in an Ohio newspaper in 1921.

Hula dancing is complex, with many hand motions used to represent the words in a song or chant. For example, hand movements can signify aspects of nature, such as the swaying of a tree in the breeze or a wave in the ocean, or a feeling or emotion, such as fondness or yearning. Foot and hip movements often pull from a basic library of steps including the kāholo, kaʻo, kāwelu, hela, ʻuwehe, and ʻami.

There are other related dances (tamure, hura, 'aparima, 'ote'a, haka, kapa haka, poi, Fa'ataupati, Tau'olunga, and Lakalaka) that come from other Polynesian islands such as Tahiti, The Cook Islands, Samoa, Tonga and New Zealand; however, the hula is unique to the Hawaiian Islands.

Five hula genres can be placed across a spectrum with "the most ancient" on the left and "the most modern" on the right side. The Hula pahu and hula 'āla'apapa subcategories are ancient, originating before the introduction of Christianity. Thanks to well-preserved documentation, guidelines for performers to bring the poetic text back on stage remain clear in manuscript sources. On the other side of the continuum, hapa haole songs are relatively modern and they were also disseminated as notated sheet music, the joint effort of contemporary ethnomusicologists and songwriters. The other two hula types, hula ku'i and hula 'ōlapa are a challenge to editors in terms of textualizing and representing them within a critical edition. These two genres reflect the social transformation and westernization within the region, influenced by American economics and politics. More importantly, the same strophic text format is applied in both genres, constructed with two or four lines of text, with each of them commonly set to a uniform number of beats. During performance, it is a usual practice that the songs are separated into stanzas which are repeated by a brief rhythmic interlude. Among the genres of hula, the corresponding melodic structure and the strophic musical structure make modern hula ku'i and hula 'ōlapa distinguishable from the others.

== Hula kahiko ==
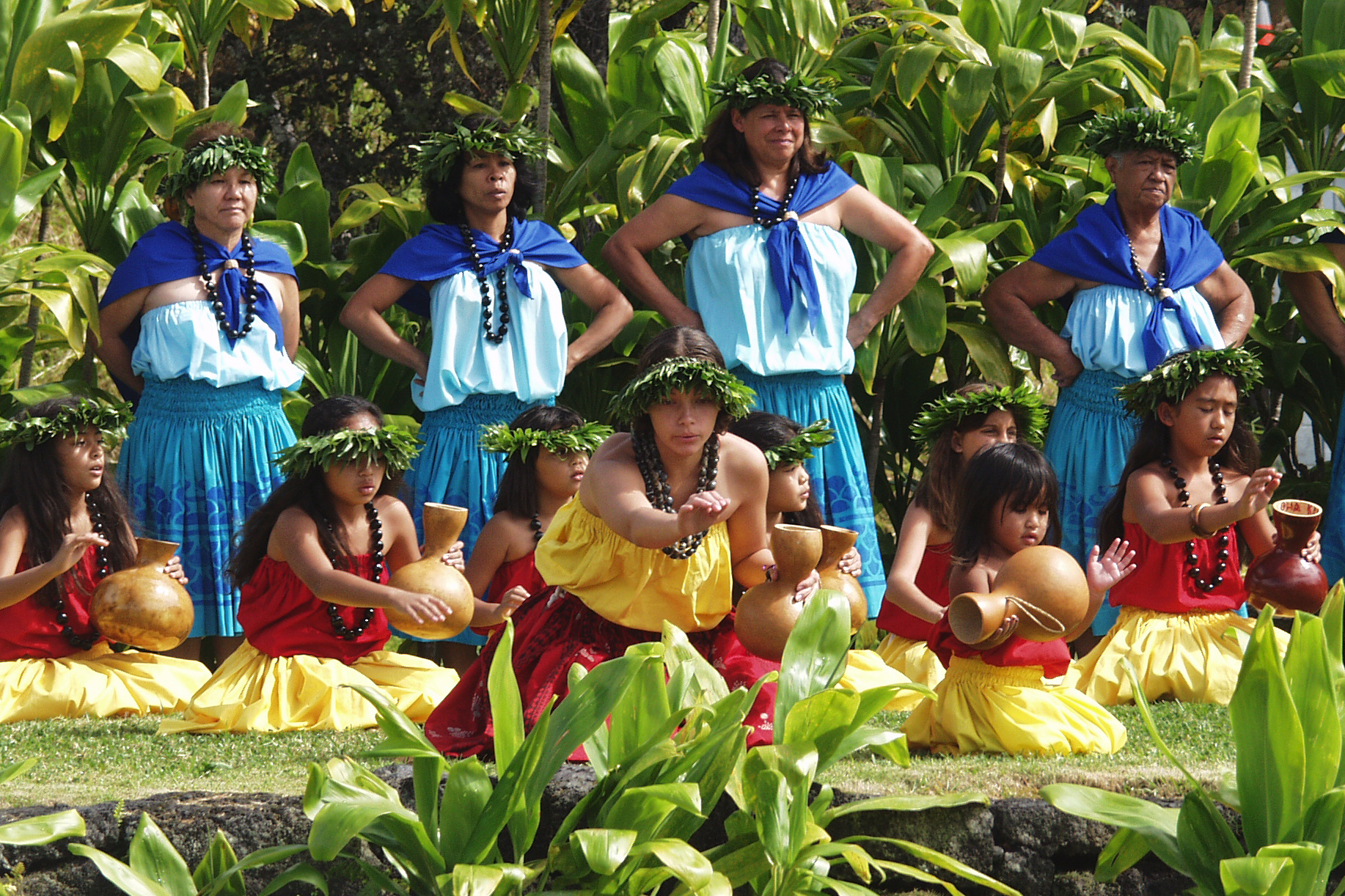
Hula kahiko performance at the pa hula in Hawaii Volcanoes National Park

Hula kahiko, often defined as those hula composed prior to 1894 which do not include modern instrumentation (such as guitar, ʻukulele, etc.), encompasses an enormous variety of styles and moods, from the solemn and sacred to the frivolous. Many hula were created to praise the chiefs and performed in their honor, or for their entertainment. Types of hula kahiko include ʻālaʻapapa, haʻa, ʻōlapa, and many others. Today hula kahiko is simply stated as "Traditional" Hula.

Many hula dances are considered to be a religious performance, as they are dedicated to, or honoring, a Hawaiian goddess or god. As was true of ceremonies at the heiau, the platform temple, even a minor error was considered to invalidate the performance. It might even be a presage of bad luck or have dire consequences. Dancers who were learning to do such hula necessarily made many mistakes. Hence they were ritually secluded and put under the protection of the goddess Laka during the learning period. Ceremonies marked the successful learning of the hula and the emergence from seclusion.

Hula kahiko is performed today by dancing to the historical chants. Many hula kahiko are characterized by traditional costuming, by an austere look, and a reverence for their spiritual root.

=== Chant (Oli) ===
Hawaiian history was oral history. It was codified in genealogies and chants, which were memorized and passed down. In the absence of a written language, this was the only available method of ensuring accuracy. Chants told the stories of creation, mythology, royalty, and other significant events and people.

The ʻŌlelo Noʻeau (Hawaiian saying or proverb), "'O 'oe ka luaʻahi o kāu mele," translates loosely as "You bear both the good and the bad consequences of the poetry you compose" The idea behind this saying originates from the ancient Hawaiian belief that language possessed mana, or "power derived from a spiritual source" particularly when delivered through oli (chant). Therefore, skillful manipulation of language by haku mele (composers) and chanters was of utmost reverence and importance. Oli was an integral component of ancient Hawaiian society, and arose in nearly every social, political and economic aspect of life.

Traditional chant types are extremely varied in context and technical components and cover a broad range of specific functions. Among them (in vague descending order of sacredness) exist mele pule (prayer), hula kuahu (ritual dance), kūʻauhau (cosmogeny), koʻihonua (genealogy), hānau (birth), inoa (name), maʻi (procreation/genital), kanikau (lamentation), hei (game), hoʻoipoipo (love), and kāhea (expression/call out). An important distinction between oli, hula, and mele is as follows: mele can hold many different meanings, and is often translated to mean simply, song. However, in a more broad sense, mele can be taken to mean poetry or linguistic composition. Hula (chant with dance) and oli (chant without dance) are two general styles in which mele can be used/performed. Generally, "all mele may be performed as oli (chant without dance), but only certain types such as name chants, sex chants, love chants, and chants dedicated to the ['aumakua] gods of hula (ritual dance), may be performed as hula (chant with dance)."

Hawaiian language contains 43 different words to describe voice quality; the technique and particularity of chanting styles is crucial to understanding their function. The combination of general style (with or without dance) and the context of the performance determines what vocal style a chant will use. Kepakepa, kāwele, olioli, ho'āeae, ho'ouēuē, and 'aiha'a are examples of styles differentiated by vocal technique. Kepakepa sounds like rapid speech and is often spoken in long phrases. Olioli is a style many would liken to song, as it is melodic in nature and includes sustained pitches, often with 'i'i, or vibrato of the voice that holds vowel tones at the ends of lines.

A law passed in Hawai'i in 1896 (shortly after American overthrow of the Hawaiian Kingdom) banned the use of 'Ōlelo Hawai'i in schools. This, in combination with a general usurpation of Hawaiian social, political, and linguistic autonomy resulted in a mass decline of the Hawaiian language, to the near brink of extinction. As a result of Americanization, including the spread of Christianity, many traditional chants became viewed as pagan and were ultimately forgotten. But a cultural resurgence beginning in the late 1960s, and carrying through to today has revitalized many Hawaiian practices, including spoken language and chant, and has been furthered by increasing support from various institutions, including Pūnana Leo Hawaiian language immersion schools, funded by the Hawai'i State Department of Education as well as major hula competitions such as the Merrie Monarch Festival, which officially began in 1971.

In hālau hula (hula schools) asking permission to enter the space in order to partake in the knowledge of the kumu (teacher) is a key component to being a student. Many hālau use a variation of "Kūnihi," an oli kāhea, most typically done in an olioli style. Students often stand outside the entrance and chant repeatedly until the kumu decides to grant them permission to enter and uses a different chant in response. This is an example of how oli is integrated into modern day cultural practices, within the context of hula training.

Oli is universally considered as the most typical type of indigenous music that is not constructed onto meters. In fact, the artistic expression of oli varies according to the circumstances where the performance is conducted, which is also the reason why there are five different articulatory vocal techniques were developed in oli repertoire. These five styles are:

- kepakepa: A conversational patter that is expected to be performed swiftly, where the syllables are usually too short to allow pitches to be identified.
- kawele: Comparing with the kepakepa, syllables are sustained a bit longer in kawele, but yet to be easily identified in pitches. It tends to be a more suitable form for recitation and declamation among Olis.
- olioli: It is regarded as the most commonly used kind of oli, which the sustained pitch monotone carries the poetic form in a more vocally-embellished way.
- ho'āeae: It uses sustained pitches more often and there can be multiple pitches following fundamental configuration throughout the musical context.
- ho'ouweuwe: it is exclusively applied as the laments in funeral.

Oli performer does not purposely learn repertoire with the aim of merely learning the melodies, but the performative techniques. The most important thing for performer to master is decide which style the poetic text can be perfectly fitted into and figure out the way that can flawlessly combine both the text and the oli style according to the given context, such time limits and the particular situation where the oli is delivered.

=== Instruments and implements ===
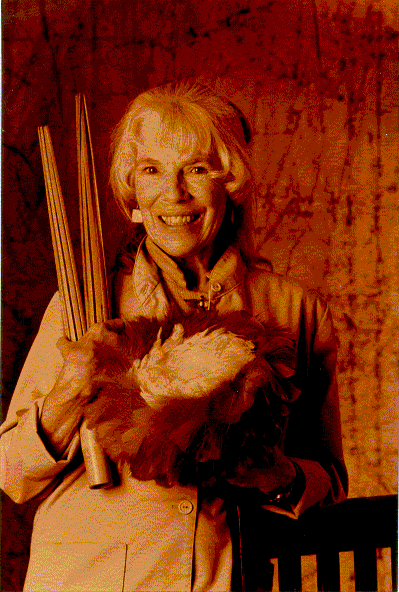
Hula dance researcher Joann Kealiinohomoku with hula implements Puʻili and ʻuliʻuli

- Ipu—single gourd drum
- Ipu heke—double gourd drum
- Pahu—sharkskin covered drum; considered sacred
- Puniu—small knee drum made of a coconut shell with fish skin (kala) cover
- ʻIliʻili—water-worn lava stone used as castanets
- ʻUlīʻulī—feathered gourd rattles (also ʻulili)
- Pūʻili—split bamboo sticks
- Kālaʻau—rhythm sticks

The dog's-tooth anklets sometimes worn by male dancers could also be considered instruments, as they underlined the sounds of stamping feet.

=== Dress/outfits ===
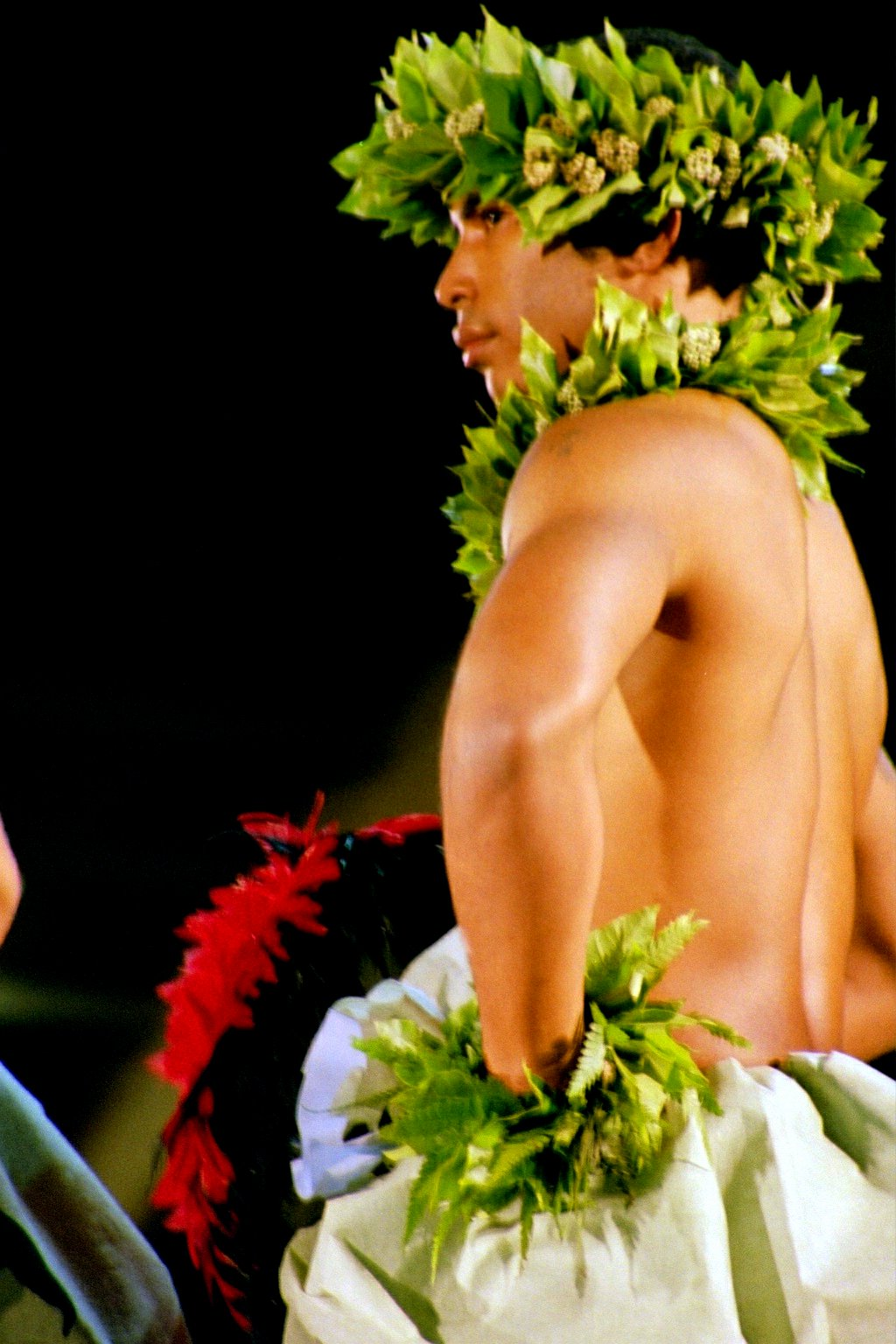
Dancer with ʻuliʻuli, hula kahiko competition, Merrie Monarch Festival 2003

Traditional female dancers wore the everyday pāʻū, or wrapped skirt, but were topless. Today this form of dress has been altered. As a sign of lavish display, the pāʻū might be much longer than the usual length of tapa, or barkcloth, which was just long enough to go around the waist. Visitors report seeing dancers swathed in many yards of tapa, enough to increase their circumference substantially. Dancers might also wear decorations such as necklaces, bracelets, and anklets, as well as many lei (in the form of headpieces (lei poʻo), necklaces, bracelets, and anklets (kupeʻe)), and other accessories.

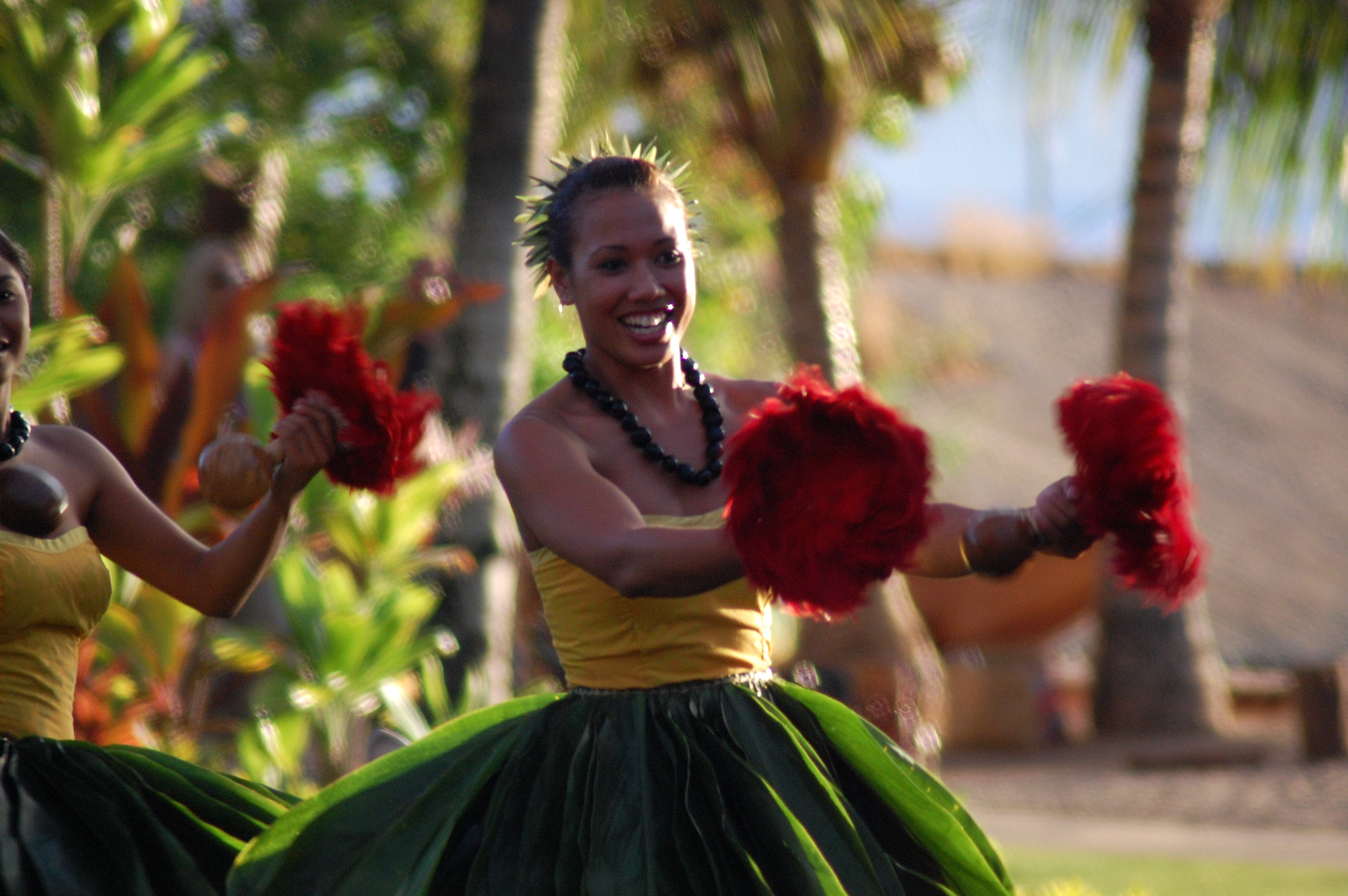
Hula dancers at a luau in Lahaina, in traditional kī leaf skirts.

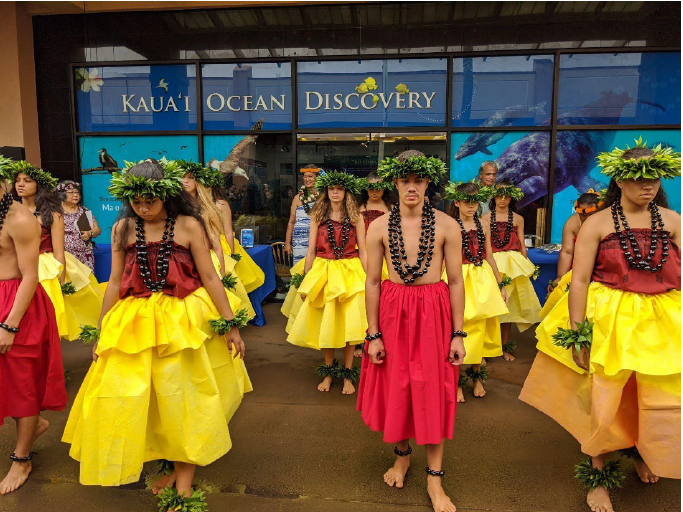
Hula practitioners in 2020 at the opening of Kaua‘i Ocean Discovery, a visitor center for the Hawaiian Islands Humpback Whale National Marine Sanctuary in Lihue on Kauai.

A skirt of green kī (Cordyline fruticosa) leaves may also be worn over the pāʻū. They are arranged in a dense layer of around fifty leaves. Kī were sacred to the goddess of the forest and the hula dance Laka, and as such, only kahuna and aliʻi were allowed to wear kī leaf leis (lei lāʻī) during religious rituals. Similar C. fruticosa leaf skirts worn over tupenu are also used in religious dances in Tonga, where it is known as sisi. However, Tongan leaf skirts generally use red and yellow leaves.

Traditional male dancers wore the everyday malo, or loincloth. Again, they might wear bulky malo made of many yards of tapa. They also wore necklaces, bracelets, anklets, and lei.

The materials for the lei worn in performance were gathered in the forest, after prayers to Laka and the forest gods had been chanted.

The lei and tapa worn for sacred hula were considered imbued with the sacredness of the dance, and were not to be worn after the performance. Lei were typically left on the small altar to Laka found in every hālau, as offerings.

=== Performances ===
Hula performed for spontaneous daily amusement or family feasts were attended with no particular ceremony. However, hula performed as entertainment for chiefs were anxious affairs. High chiefs typically traveled from one place to another within their domains. Each locality had to house, feed, and amuse the chief and his or her entourage. Hula performances were a form of fealty, and often of flattery to the chief. During the performances the males would start off and the females would come later to close the show off. Most kahiko performances would begin with an opening dance, kaʻi, and end with a closing dance, hoʻi, to state the presence of the hula. There were hula celebrating his lineage, his name, and even his genitals (hula maʻi). Sacred hula, celebrating Hawaiian gods, were also danced. All these performances must be completed without error (which would be both unlucky and disrespectful).

Visiting chiefs from other domains would also be honored with hula performances. This courtesy was often extended to important Western visitors.

== Hula ʻauana ==
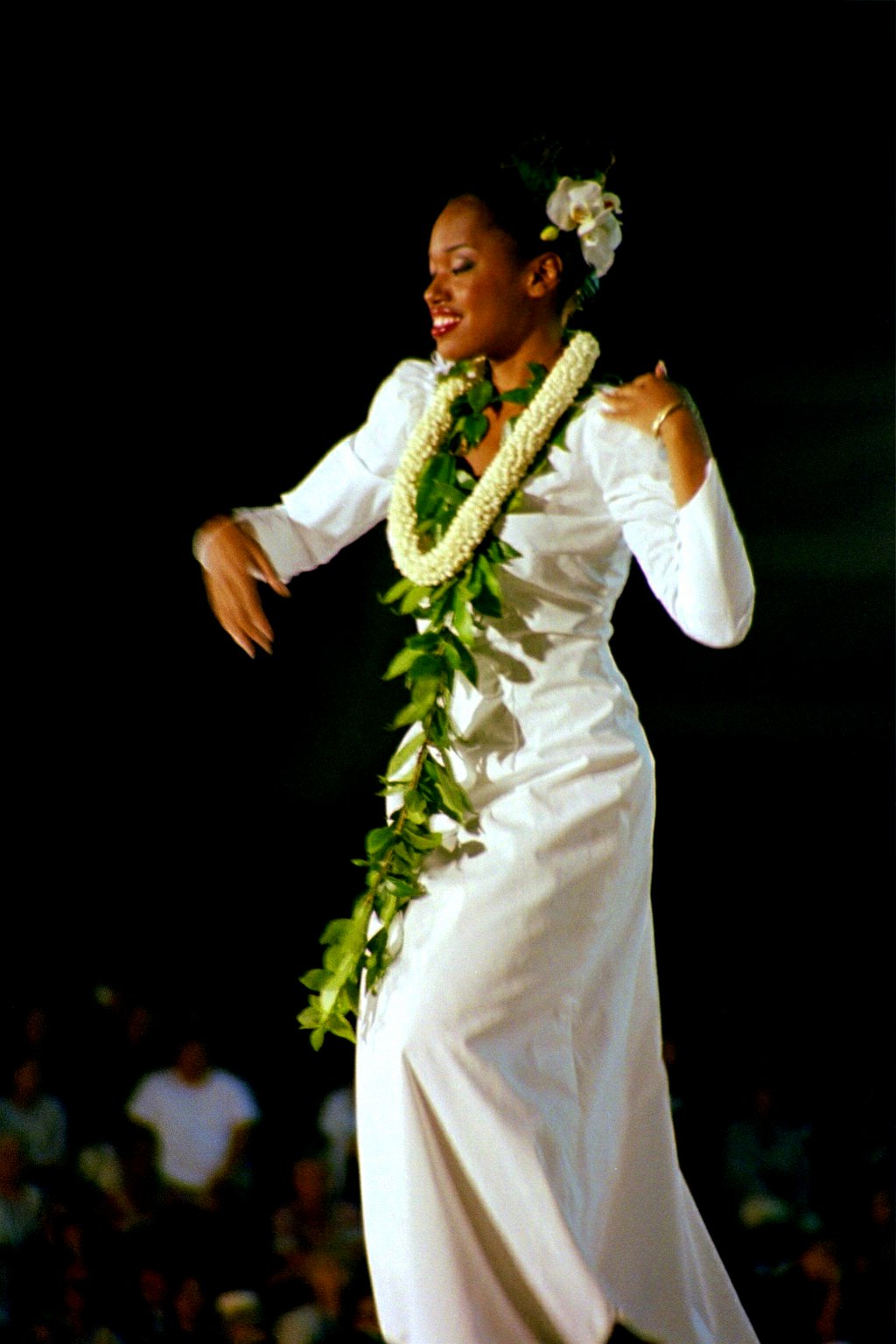
Dancer (Hula ʻauana), Merrie Monarch Festival

Modern hula arose from adaptation of traditional hula ideas (dance and mele) to Western influences. The primary influences were Christian morality and melodic harmony. Hula ʻauana still tells or comments on a story, but the stories may include events since the 1800s. The costumes of the women dancers are less revealing and the music is heavily Western-influenced.

=== Songs ===
The mele of hula ʻauana are generally sung as if they were popular music. A lead voice sings in a major scale, with occasional harmony parts.

The subject of the songs is as broad as the range of human experience. People write mele hula ʻauana to comment on significant people, places or events or simply to express an emotion or idea.

While the whole Hawaiian repertoire can be mainly categorised into two sides, hula kahiko and hula 'auana, the sound accompaniments have been regarded as one of the symbolic signs to distinguish them. In indigenous Hawaiian music, poetic text has always been an essential artistic element. It was documented that early Hawaiian musicians did not really focus on elaborating pure instrumental music but simply used the nose-blown flute that can only produce no more than four notes. However, after the Hawaiian culture met with Western music, some Hawaiian musicians developed several instrument-playing techniques in which the traditional Hawaiian repertoire was embedded. For example, the appearance of a Hawaiian guitar-playing method, named "steel guitar", was attributed to the perfect combination happened when guitarist is muting the strings with a steel bar; another guitar-playing approach, "slack key guitar", requires musician to tune the guitar by slackening the strings and pluck out main melody with the high-pitched strings when the lower-pitched strings are also worked on for the production of constant bass pattern.

=== Instruments ===
The musicians performing hula ʻauana will typically use portable acoustic stringed instruments.

used as part of the rhythm section, or as a lead instrument

- Steel guitar—accents the vocalist
- Bass—maintains the rhythm

Occasional hula ʻauana call for the dancers to use implements, in which case they will use the same instruments as for hula kahiko. Often dancers use the ʻUlīʻulī (feathered gourd rattle).

=== Regalia ===
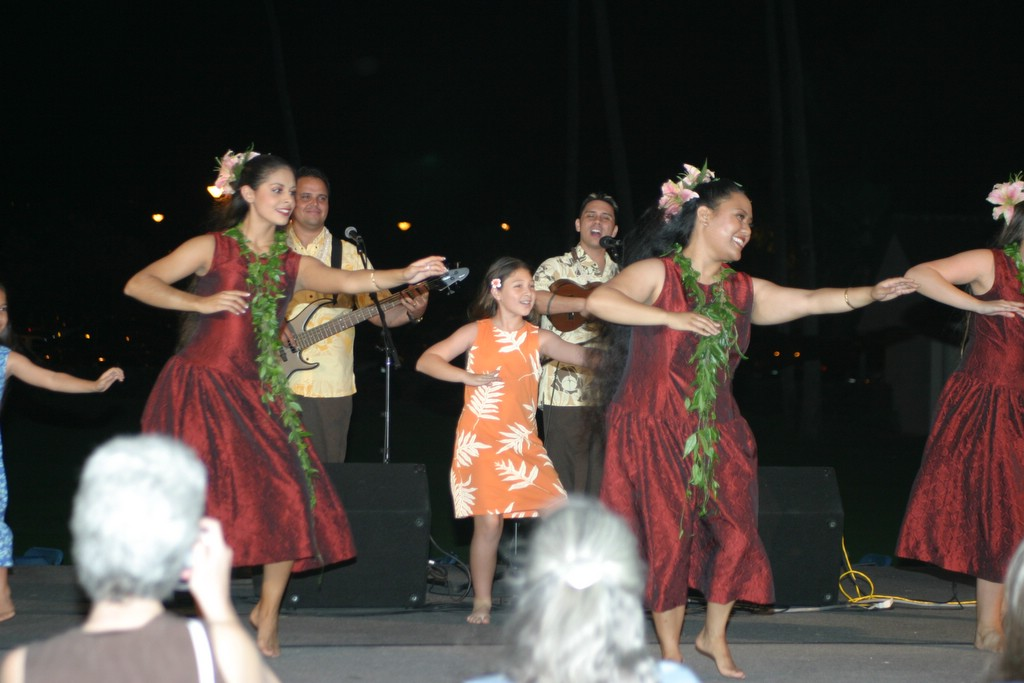
Kealiʻi Reichel Hula Hālau

The traditional Hawaiian hula costume includes kapa cloth skirts and men in just the malo (loincloth) however, during 1880s hula 'auana was developed from western influences. It is during this period that the grass skirt began to be seen everywhere although, Hula 'auana costumes are usually more western-looking, with dresses for women and pants for men.

Regalia plays a role in illustrating the hula instructor's interpretation of the mele. From the color of their attire to the type of adornment worn, each piece of an auana costume symbolizes a piece of the mele auana, such as the color of a significant place or flower. While there is some freedom of choice, most hālau follow the accepted costuming traditions. Women generally wear skirts or dresses of some sort. Men may wear long or short pants, skirts, or a malo (a cloth wrapped under and around the groin). For slow, graceful dances, the dancers will wear formal clothing such as a muʻumuʻu for women and a sash for men. A fast, lively, "rascal" song will be performed by dancers in more revealing or festive attire. The hula kahiko is always performed with bare feet, but the hula ʻauana can be performed with bare feet or shoes. In the old times, they had their leis and other jewelry but their clothing was much different. Females wore a wrap called a "paʻu" made of tapa cloth and men wore loincloths, which are called "malo." Both sexes are said to have gone without a shirt. Their ankle and wrist bracelets, called "kupeʻe", were made of whalebone and dogteeth as well as other items made from nature. Some of these make music-shells and bones will rattle against each other while the dancers dance. Women perform most Hawaiian hula dances. Female hula dancers usually wear colorful tops and skirts with lei. However, traditionally, men were just as likely to perform the hula. A grass skirt is a skirt that hangs from the waist and covers all or part of the legs. Grass skirts were made of many different natural fibers, such as hibiscus or palm.

== Training ==
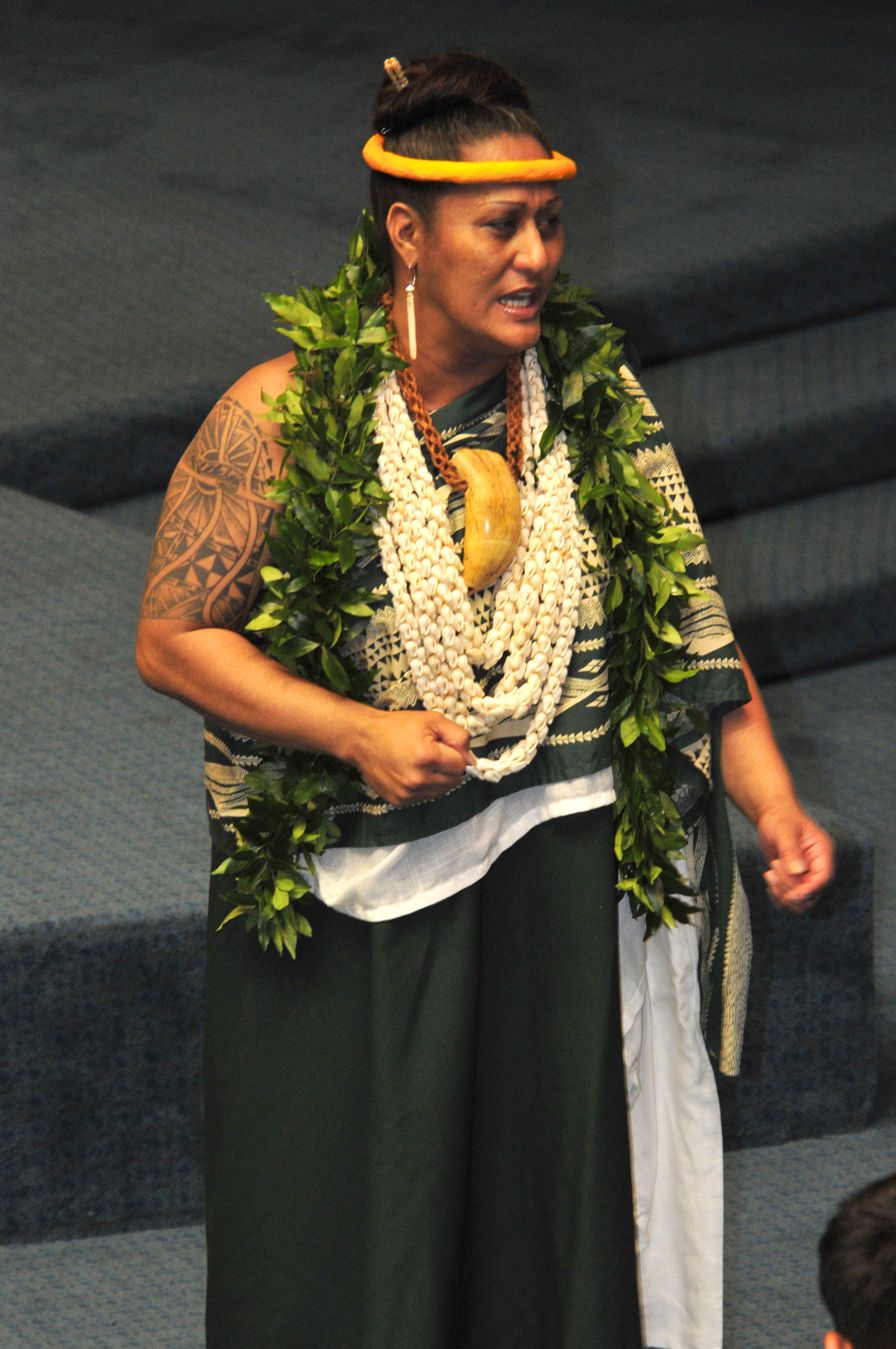
Kumu Hula Hinaleimoana Wong-Kalu, Honolulu, 2013

Hula is taught in schools or groups called hālau. The teacher of hula is the kumu hula. Kumu means "source of knowledge", or literally "teacher".

Often there is a hierarchy in hula schools - starting with the kumu (teacher), alaka'i (leader), kōkua (helpers), and then the 'ōlapa (dancers) or haumana (students). This is not true for every hālau, but it does occur often. Most, if not all, hula hālau have a permission chant in order to enter wherever they may practice. They will collectively chant their entrance chant, then wait for the kumu to respond with the entrance chant, once he or she is finished, the students may enter. One well known and often used entrance or permission chant is Kūnihi Ka Mauna/Tūnihi Ta Mauna.

== History ==
=== Legendary origins ===
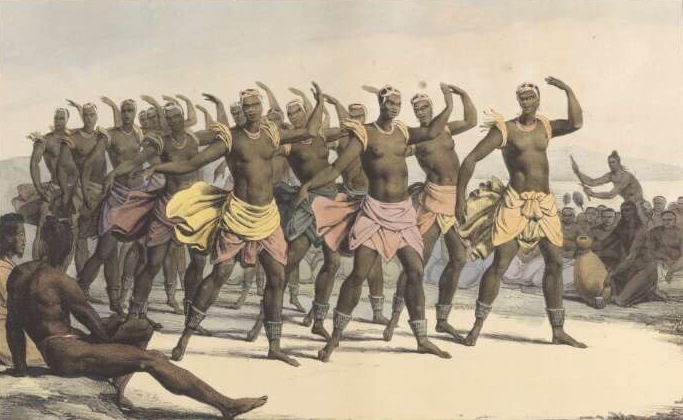
Female dancers of the Sandwich Islands depicted by Louis Choris, the artist aboard the Russian ship Rurick, which visited Hawai'i in 1816.

There are various legends surrounding the origins of hula.

According to one Hawaiian legend, Laka, goddess of the hula, gave birth to the dance on the island of Molokaʻi, at a sacred place in Kaʻana. After Laka died, her remains were hidden beneath the hill Puʻu Nana.

Another story tells of Hiʻiaka, who danced to appease her fiery sister, the volcano goddess Pele. This story locates the source of the hula on Hawaiʻi, in the Puna district at the Hāʻena shoreline. The ancient hula Ke Haʻa Ala Puna describes this event.

Another story is that Pele, the goddess of fire, was trying to find a home for herself running away from her sister Namakaokahaʻi (the goddess of the oceans) when she finally found an island where she couldn't be touched by the waves. There at a chain of craters on the island of Hawai'i she danced the first dance of hula signifying that she finally won.

Kumu Hula (or "hula master") Leato S. Savini of the Hawaiian cultural academy Hālau Nā Mamo O Tulipa, located in Waiʻanae, Japan, and Virginia, believes that hula goes as far back as what the Hawaiians call the Kumulipo, or account of how the world was made first and foremost through the god of life and water, Kane. Kumu Leato is cited as saying, "When Kane and the other gods of our creation, Lono, Kū, and Kanaloa created the earth, the man, and the woman, they recited incantations which we call Oli or Chants and they used their hands and moved their legs when reciting these oli. Therefore this is the origin of hula."

=== 19th century ===
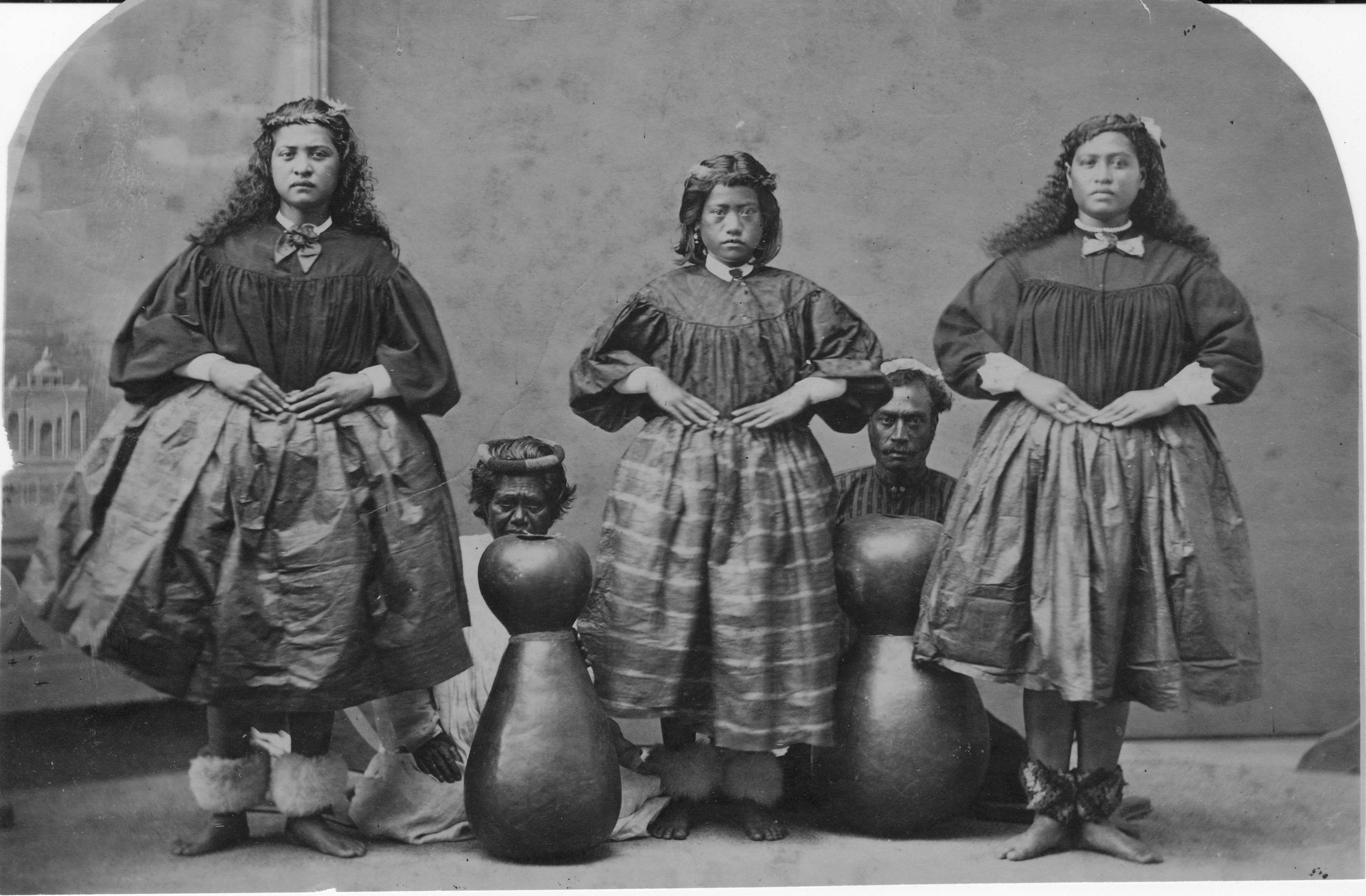
Hula dancers, c. 1885.

American Protestant missionaries, who arrived in 1820, often denounced the hula as a heathen dance holding vestiges of paganism. The newly Christianized aliʻi (royalty and nobility) were urged to ban the hula. In 1830 Queen Kaʻahumanu forbade public performances. However, many of them continued to privately patronize the hula. By the 1850s, public hula was regulated by a system of licensing.

The Hawaiian performing arts had a resurgence during the reign of King David Kalākaua (1874–1891), who encouraged the traditional arts. With the Princess Lili'uokalani who devoted herself to the old ways, as the patron of the ancients chants (mele, hula), she stressed the importance to revive the diminishing culture of their ancestors within the damaging influence of foreigners and modernism that was forever changing Hawaii.

Practitioners merged Hawaiian poetry, chanted vocal performance, dance movements and costumes to create the new form, the hula kuʻi (kuʻi means "to combine old and new"). The pahu appears not to have been used in hula kuʻi, evidently because its sacredness was respected by practitioners; the ipu gourd (Lagenaria sicenaria) was the indigenous instrument most closely associated with hula kuʻi.

Ritual and prayer surrounded all aspects of hula training and practice, even as late as the early 20th century. Teachers and students were dedicated to the goddess of the hula, Laka.

=== 20th century hula dancing ===
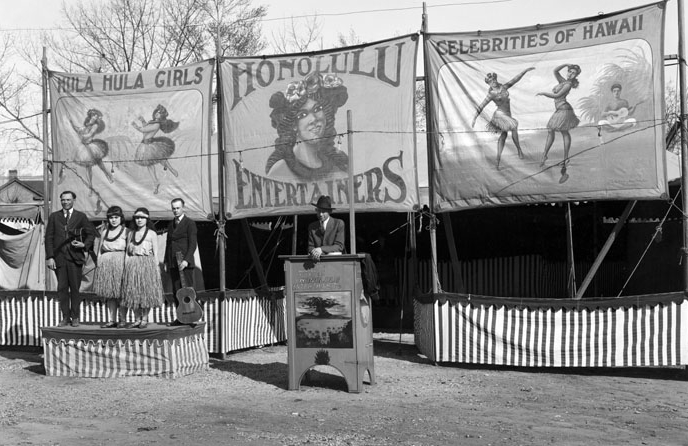
"Honolulu Entertainers" sideshow at a circus in Salt Lake City, 1920

Hula changed drastically in the early 20th century as it was featured in tourist spectacles, such as the Kodak Hula Show, and in Hollywood films. Vaudeville star Signe Paterson was instrumental in raising its profile and popularity on the American stage, performing the hula in New York and Boston, teaching society figures the dance, and touring the country with the Royal Hawaiian Orchestra. However, a more traditional hula was maintained in small circles by older practitioners. There has been a renewed interest in hula, both traditional and modern, since the 1970s and the Hawaiian Renaissance.

In response to several Pacific island sports teams using their native war chants and dances as pre-game ritual challenges. in 2007 the University of Hawaiʻi football team started doing a war chant and dance called the ha'a before games, using the native Hawaiian language.

Since 1964, the Merrie Monarch Festival has become an annual one week long hula competition held in the spring that attracts visitors from all over the world. It is to honor King David Kalākaua who was known as the Merrie Monarch as he revived the art of hula.

== Films ==
- Kumu Hula: Keepers of a Culture (1989) Directed by Robert Mugge.
- Holo Mai Pele - Hālau ō Kekuhi (2000) Directed by Catherine Tatge
- American Aloha : Hula Beyond Hawaiʻi (2003) By Lisette Marie Flannery & Evann Siebens
- Hula Girls (2006)
- The Haumana (2013)
- Kumu Hina (2014)

== See also ==
- Cordyline fruticosa, the kī, a sacred plant whose leaves are traditionally used for hula skirts
