= Hinaleimoana Wong-Kalu =

Native Hawaiian filmmaker, artist, activist and community leader

Hina Wong-Kalu
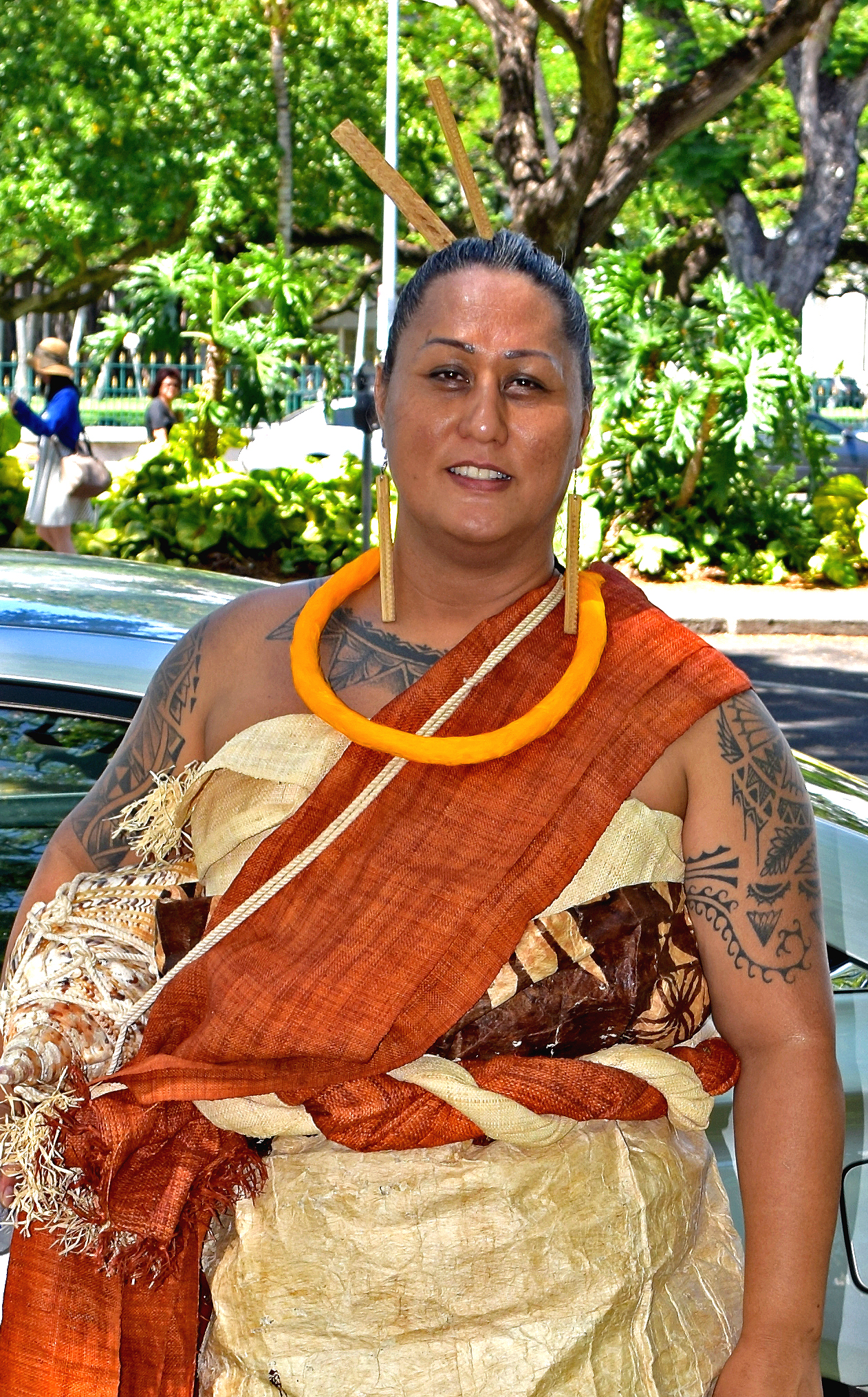
- Wong-Kalu at the Kamehameha Day lei draping ceremony, 2016
- Born: May 15, 1972 (age 54); Nuʻuanu, Hawaiʻi, U.S.
- Other name: Kumu Hina
- Education: University of Hawaiʻi, Mānoa (BA, BEd)

Hinaleimoana Kwai Kong (Hina) Wong-Kalu (born May 15, 1972) is a Native Hawaiian māhū – a traditional third gender person who occupies "a place in the middle" between male and female – and a modern transgender woman. She is commonly known as Kumu Hina, a name that became widespread after the documentary of the same name introduced her to a broader audience. She is known for her work as a kumu hula ("hula teacher"), as a filmmaker, artist, activist, and as a community leader in the field of Kānaka Maoli language and cultural preservation. She teaches Kānaka Maoli philosophy and traditions that promote cross-cultural alliances throughout the Pacific Islands. Kumu Hina is known as a "powerful performer with a clear, strong voice" and has been hailed as "a cultural icon".

== Early life and education ==
Wong-Kalu was born on May 15, 1972, in the Nuʻuanu district of Oʻahu. Her mother is of English, Hawaiian, and Portuguese descent and her father is of Chinese descent. She is the youngest of four siblings. She attended Kamehameha School (1990) and the University of Hawaiʻi at Mānoa (1996–2004) where she began her activism.

== Career ==
Wong-Kalu is Cultural Ambassador for the Council for Native Hawaiian Advancement.

Wong-Kalu is a founder of the Kulia Na Mamo transgender health project and cultural director of a Hawaiian public charter school. She is also a former Hawaiian-language kumu at Leeward Community College. As a candidate for the Office of Hawaiian Affairs, she was one of the first transgender candidates for statewide political office in the United States. She also served as the Chair of the Oʻahu Island Burial Council, which oversees the management of Native Hawaiian burial sites and ancestral remains.

Wong-Kalu was the subject of the feature documentary film Kumu Hina, directed and produced by Dean Hamer and Joe Wilson. Kumu Hina premiered as the closing night film in the Hawaiʻi International Film Festival in 2014 and won several awards including best documentary at the Frameline Film Festival and the GLAAD Media Award for Outstanding Documentary. It was nationally broadcast on PBS in 2015 where it won the Independent Lens Audience Award. In 2022, Wong-Kalu was one of the curators for a Bishop Museum exhibit on the Waikīkī's Healer Stones of Kapaemāhū.

=== Filmmaker ===
Subsequent to the release of Kumu Hina, Wong-Kalu helped make an educational children's version of the film, A Place in the Middle, which premiered at the Berlin International Film Festival and Toronto International Film Festival for Kids and is featured on PBS learning media.

Wong-Kalu, along with directors Dean Hamer and Joe Wilson, co-produced the short film, Lady Eva and feature documentary Leitis in Waiting about the struggle of the indigenous transgender community in the South Pacific Kingdom of Tonga. These films were recognized and won awards at AFI Docs, the LA Film Festival, Margaret Mead Film Festival, FIFO film festival, and Festival of Commonwealth Film, won the GLAAD Media Award for documentaries that accurately portray issues among LGBTQI+ communities globally, andwere broadcast on PBS/Pacific Heartbeat, ARTE, Maori TV, TV France and NITV.

In 2020, Wong-Kalu collaborated with Dean Hamer and Joe Wilson to co-diirect, produce, and narrate Kapaemahu, an animated short film based on the Hawaiian story of four legendary māhū who brought the healing arts from Tahiti to Hawaiʻi and imbued their powers on giant boulders that still stand on Waikīkī Beach after the introduction of the U.S. government and tourism. Narrated in the rare Ni'ihau dialect of Hawaiian, the film premiered at the Tribeca Film Festival and was shortlisted for an Oscar for Best Animated Short Film at the 93rd Academy Awards In 2022, a book based on the film was published.

== Awards and honors ==
She is a recipient of the National Education Association Ellison Onizuka Human and Civil Rights Award, Native Hawaiian Community Educator of the year, and is a White House Champion of Change. USA Today named Wong-Kalu one of ten Women of the Century from Hawaiʻi. Wong-Kalu is also featured in Naomi Hirahara's 2022 anthology We Are Here: 30 Inspiring Asian Americans and Pacific Islanders Who Have Shaped the United States that was published by the Smithsonian Institution and Running Press Kids.

== Personal life ==
Wong-Kalu was married to Haemaccelo Kalu, a native of Tonga.

== Filmography ==
- Lady Eva
- Leitis in Waiting
- A Place in the Middle
- Kapaemahu (2020)

== See also ==
- List of people with non-binary gender identities
