= Out in the Silence =

- Directed by: Joe Wilson and Dean Hamer
- Produced by: Joe Wilson and Dean Hamer
- Edited by: Nels Bangerter
- Music by: Namoli Brennet, Joel Douek
- Distributed by: Garden Thieves
- Release date: August 5, 2009 (Rhode Island)
- Running time: 65 minutes
- Country: United States
- Language: English
- Budget: $245,000

Out in the Silence is a 2009 documentary film directed by Joe Wilson and Dean Hamer. It chronicles the chain of events that occur when the severe bullying of a gay teenager draws Wilson and his partner back to the conservative rural community of Oil City, Pennsylvania, where their own same-sex wedding announcement had previously ignited a controversy. The film focuses on the widely varying, emotional reactions of the town's residents including the teenager and his mother, the head of the local chapter of the American Family Association, and an evangelical pastor and his wife.

== Community engagement campaign ==
The Out in the Silence Campaign for Fairness and Equality in Rural and Small Town America used the film as a tool to raise the visibility of lesbian, gay, bisexual and transgender (LGBT) people and promote dialogue and bridge building. The campaign held over 500 grassroots screenings in town halls, schools, churches, and community centers, many in isolated areas that had not previously experienced openly LGBT events. The Center for Social Media and the BRITDOC Foundation highlighted the campaign as an example of using film for social change.

In 2011, the Campaign initiated the Out in the Silence Youth Activism Award to highlight the work of young people on LGBT inclusion and equality.

In 2022, Frameline Film Festival established the Out in the SIlence award to recognize outstanding film projects that highlight brave acts of LGBTQ+ visibility in places where such acts are not common. Winners of the award include Black as U R (2022), All the Colors of the World are Between Black and White (2023), Any Other Way: The Jackie Shane Story (2024), The Secret of Me (2025), and Trial of Hein (2026).

== Awards and recognition ==
=== Festival awards and recognition ===
- Premiere, Human Rights Watch International Film Festival, Lincoln Center, NYC
- Winner, Special Jury Prize for Bravery in Storytelling, Nashville Film Festival
- Winner, Special Jury Prize for Social Significance, South Dakota Film Festival
- Winner, Alternative Spirit Award, Rhode Island International Film Festival
- Winner, Audience Award, Hardacre Film and Cinema Festival
- Winner, Best Documentary, Rehoboth Beach Independent Film Festival
- Winner, Best Documentary, Long Island Gay and Lesbian Film Festival
- Winner, Best Documentary, Out Takes New Zealand Gay Lesbian Film Festival
- Winner, Rosebud Award, Rosebud Film Festival
- Featured presentation, Tribeca Documentary Series

=== Television broadcast and awards ===
- Broadcast premiere, PBS, 2010
- Encore broadcasts, World Channel, 2010; PBS, 2011
- America Reframed broadcast, World Channel, 2015
- Emmy Award, Outstanding Achievement in Documentary, National Academy of Television Arts and Sciences Mid-Atlantic Chapter
