= Kapaemahu (book) =

2022 picture book

- First edition book cover
- Author: Hinaleimoana Wong-Kalu, Dean Hamer, and Joe Wilson
- Illustrator: Daniel Sousa
- Publisher: Kokila
- Publication date: June 7, 2022
- Awards: Lambda Literary Award
- ISBN: 9780593530061

Kapaemahu is a 2022 picture book written by Hinaleimoana Wong-Kalu, Dean Hamer, and Joe Wilson, and illustrated by Daniel Sousa. The book, which was originally produced as an animated short film, provides a retelling of an ancient Indigenous Hawaiian legend and is written in both ʻŌlelo Niʻihau and English.

In 2023, Kapaemahu was a finalist for the Lambda Literary Award for Children's Literature, as well as a Stonewall Book Award honor book.

== Plot ==
Kapaemahu recounts an ancient Hawaiian legend about four spirits: Kapaemahu, Kapuni, Kinohi, and Kahaloa. Each spirit was mahu, meaning they embodied both feminine and masculine aspects in mind, heart, and spirit; they also possessed unique healing abilities: Kapaemahu healed through touch, Kapuni addressed spiritual healing, Kinohi could diagnose ailments, and Kahaloa could heal from a distance.

Centuries ago, these mahu traveled from Tahiti to Waikiki, sharing their healing knowledge with the locals. As a tribute, the islanders constructed a monument by transporting four large boulders from the mountain to the beach. The mahu transferred their powers to these rocks before disappearing.

The monument stood on the beach for many generations, but with time, the monument and the stories and wisdom it represented faded from memory.

== Reception ==
Kapaemahu received starred reviews from Kirkus Reviews, School Library Journal, and Shelf Awareness.

Kirkus Reviews called Kapaemahu "a poignant monument to the power of hidden Indigenous histories", noting that the book "underscores the importance of preserving sacred spaces". They also highlighted how "the book pays homage to Indigenous Hawaiian healing traditions and affirms two-spirit people".

Terry Hong, writing for Shelf Awareness, highlighted the book's illustrations: "Sousa's full-page bleeds and saturated palette of predominantly deep earth colors display potent images. Light heightens Sousa's superb imagery: glowing golds underscore gentle strength; soft, wispy white captures healing energy." Hong concluded that the illustration's "power continues to flow through transparent prose and magnificent visuals, gifting audiences with insights celebrating acceptance and inspiring strength".

Elizabeth Bush, writing for The Bulletin of the Center for Children's Books, also praised the Sousa's illustrations, which "portray the healers as chiseled, monumental forms reminiscent of the stones that house their spirits". Bush further stated that "the inky shadows and rich red-gold light of the ancient tale contrasts dramatically with the sand-reflected brightness of modern Waikiki".

Booklist also reviewed the book.

== Awards and honors ==
School Library Journal and Shelf Awareness included Kapaemahu on their list of the best children's books of 2022. School Library Journal also included the audiobook on their list of the top ten audiobooks of 2022.

Awards for Kapaemahu
Year	Award	Result	Ref.
2023	Lambda Literary Award for Children's Literature	Finalist	
2023	Stonewall Book Award	Honor	
