= Kumu Hina =

2014 American LGBTQ documentary film

- Directed by: Dean Hamer; Joe Wilson
- Written by: Dean Hamer; Joe Wilson
- Produced by: Dean Hamer; Joe Wilson
- Cinematography: Dean Hamer; Joe Wilson
- Edited by: Nels Bangerter
- Music by: Makana
- Production companies: Qwaves and Independent Television Service; Pacific Islanders in Communications
- Distributed by: Passion River Films; Alexander Press
- Release date: April 10, 2014 (Hawaii International Film Festival)
- Running time: 77 minutes
- Country: United States
- Languages: English; Hawaiian; Tongan
- Budget: $410,000

Kumu Hina is a 2014 American LGBTQ related documentary film co-produced and co-directed by Dean Hamer and Joe Wilson. It is based on the story of Hina Wong-Kalu, and stars Wong-Kalu, Haemaccelo Kalu and Hoʻonani Kamai. The film premiered at the Hawaii International Film Festival on April 10, 2014, and had its television debut on Independent Lens in May 2015.

== Synopsis ==
Hina Wong-Kalu is a māhū - a Native Hawaiian term for individuals of dual male and female mind, heart, and spirit - who serves her community as a kumu (teacher), activist and cultural icon. She lives her life "in the middle", in between the traditional ways of Hawaii's indigenous māhū culture and as a modern transgender person in contemporary Hawaii, trying to preserve and pass on the indigenous culture to the younger generations. Māhū were once valued and respected as caretakers, healers, and teachers of ancient traditions who passed on sacred knowledge, but missionaries who arrived imposed their language and religious strictures across the Hawaiian islands, and pushed against this concept.

During the year covered by the film, Kumu Hina mentors one of the students, Hoʻonani, who also finds herself "in the middle" when she wants to join the all-male hula group in her school. The film also follows Kumu Hina's personal life as she seeks a committed romantic relationship with a man from Tonga, and travels into the hills to meet her elders, the traditional third gender māhū who live together on the land and provide her with spiritual guidance.

== Cast ==
- Haemaccelo Kalu as self
- Hoʻonani Kamai as self
- Hinaleimoana Wong-Kalu as self

== Reception and release ==
Kumu Hina won the Documentary Jury award at the Frameline Film Festival and the Audience Award as the most popular documentary among voting viewers for the 2014–2015 season of Independent Lens. In 2016, the film won Outstanding Documentary from the GLAAD Media Awards.

Filmmaker magazine called the film "a stunning eye-opener", while Indiewire considered it "incredibly poignant and moving", and YES! magazine commended the film for "lifting the veil on the misunderstood and marginalized experience of 'other' gendered individuals whose identity cannot be defined by the broad strokes of contemporary Western categorization". The film has been termed "revolutionary" for its portrayal of "relationships and aspects of gender identity considered taboo and unmentionable in American society," and is considered to be an important contributor to the normalization of the māhū in mainstream media.

=== Release ===
The film premiered as the closing night film the Hawaii International Film Festival on April 10, 2014, and had its television debut on Independent Lens in May 2015. It was streamed on Netflix and Vimeo

== Education campaign ==
The filmmakers initiated an education campaign to bring Kumu Hina's message to diverse audiences. The campaign, launched at an event at the Ford Foundation, includes a short children's version of the film, A Place in the Middle, and teaching and classroom discussion guides.

== Accolades ==
Festival / Organization	Award	Result	Ref.
Asian American International Film Festival	Best Documentary	Won	
Berlin International Film Festival	Best Short Film	Nominated	
Frameline Film Festival	Example	Won	
GLAAD Media Awards	Outstanding Documentary	Won	
Honolulu Rainbow Film Festival	Special Jury Award	Won	
Independent Lens Audience Award	Audience Award	Won	
Pacific International Documentary Film Festival	Best Documentary	Won	
Philadelphia Asian American Film Festival	Best Documentary	Won	
Reeling: The Chicago LGBTQ+ International Film Festival	Best Documentary	Won	
Rhode Island International Film Festival	Best LGBTQ Film	Won	
San Diego Asian Film Festival	Special Jury Award	Won	
Seattle Queer Film Festival	Best Documentary	Nominated	
