= Violence against LGBTQ people =

LGBTQ people experience violence due to their sexuality, gender identity, or gender expression. This violence may be enacted by the state, as in laws prescribing punishment for homosexual acts, or by individuals. It may be psychological or physical and motivated by biphobia, gayphobia, homophobia, lesbophobia, and transphobia. Influencing factors may be cultural, religious, or political mores and biases.

Currently, homosexual acts are legal in almost all Western countries, and in many of these countries violence against LGBTQ people is classified as a hate crime. Outside the West, many countries are deemed potentially dangerous to their LGBTQ population due to both discriminatory legislation and threats of violence. These include most African countries (except South Africa), most Asian countries (except some LGBTQ-friendly countries as Japan, Taiwan, Thailand, Vietnam and the Philippines), and some former communist countries such as Russia, Armenia, Belarus, Poland, Slovakia and Serbia. Such violence is often associated with religious condemnation of homosexuality or conservative social attitudes that portray homosexuality as an illness or a character flaw.

Historically, state-sanctioned persecution of homosexuals was mostly limited to male homosexuality, termed "sodomy". During the Middle Ages and the early modern period, the penalty for sodomy was usually death. During the modern period (from the 19th century to the mid-20th century) in the Western world, the penalty was usually a fine or imprisonment. There was a drop in locations where homosexual acts remained illegal from 2009 when there were 80 countries worldwide (notably throughout the Middle East, Central Asia and in most of Africa, but also in some of the Caribbean and Oceania) with five carrying the death penalty to 2016 when 72 countries criminalized consensual sexual acts between adults of the same sex.

Brazil, a country with LGBTQ rights protections and legal same-sex marriage, is reported by Grupo Gay da Bahia (GGB) to have the world's highest LGBTQ murder rate, with more than 380 murders in 2017 alone, an increase of 30% compared to 2016. Gay men experience potentially fatal violence in several places in the world, for example by ISIS, stoning by Nigeria, and others.

In some countries, 85% of LGBTQ students experience homophobic and transphobic violence in school, and 45% of transgender students drop out of school.

== State-sanctioned violence ==
=== Historic ===
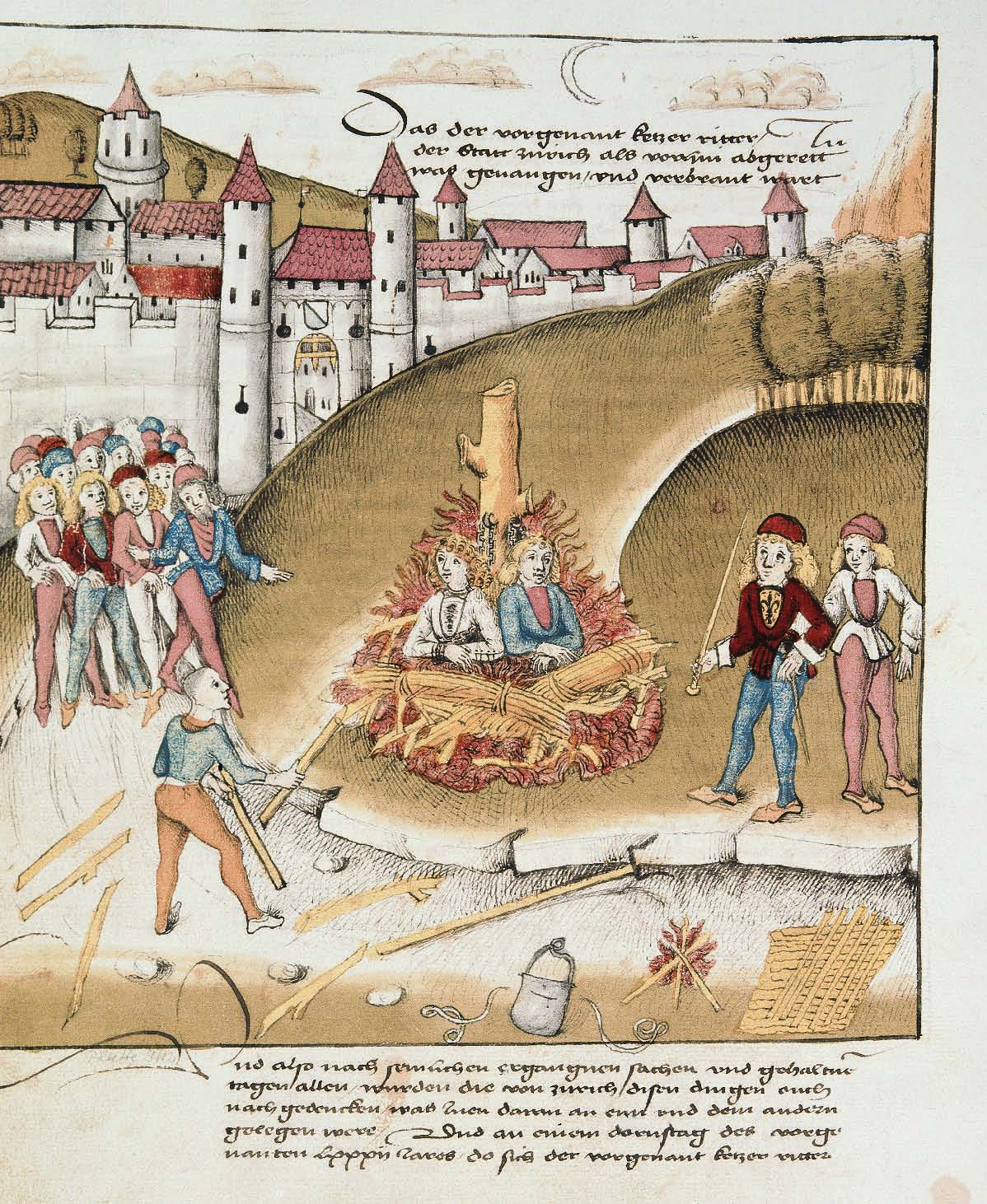
A swiss knight Sir Richard Puller von Hohenburg and his squire are being punished for their acts of sodomy through being burned at the stake. Zurich, Switzerland. 1482 (Zurich Central Library)

==== The Middle East ====
The Torah, which contains the basis for the law codes of Judaism, contains, among prohibitions against a variety of sexual relationships in Leviticus, with one verse of prohibition against male-male intercourse in Leviticus 18:22. To contextualize the emphasis biblical authors had for this prohibition compare it to Leviticus 18:19's prohibition against a man having intercourse with a menstruous woman or the eight verses of Numbers 35:1-8 spent on describing city planning. A violent criminal penal code regarding same-sex intercourse is prescribed in the Middle Assyrian Law Codes (1075 BCE), stating: "If a man lays down with his own brethren, when they have prosecuted and convicted him, they shall stay with him and turn him into a eunuch".

==== Europe ====
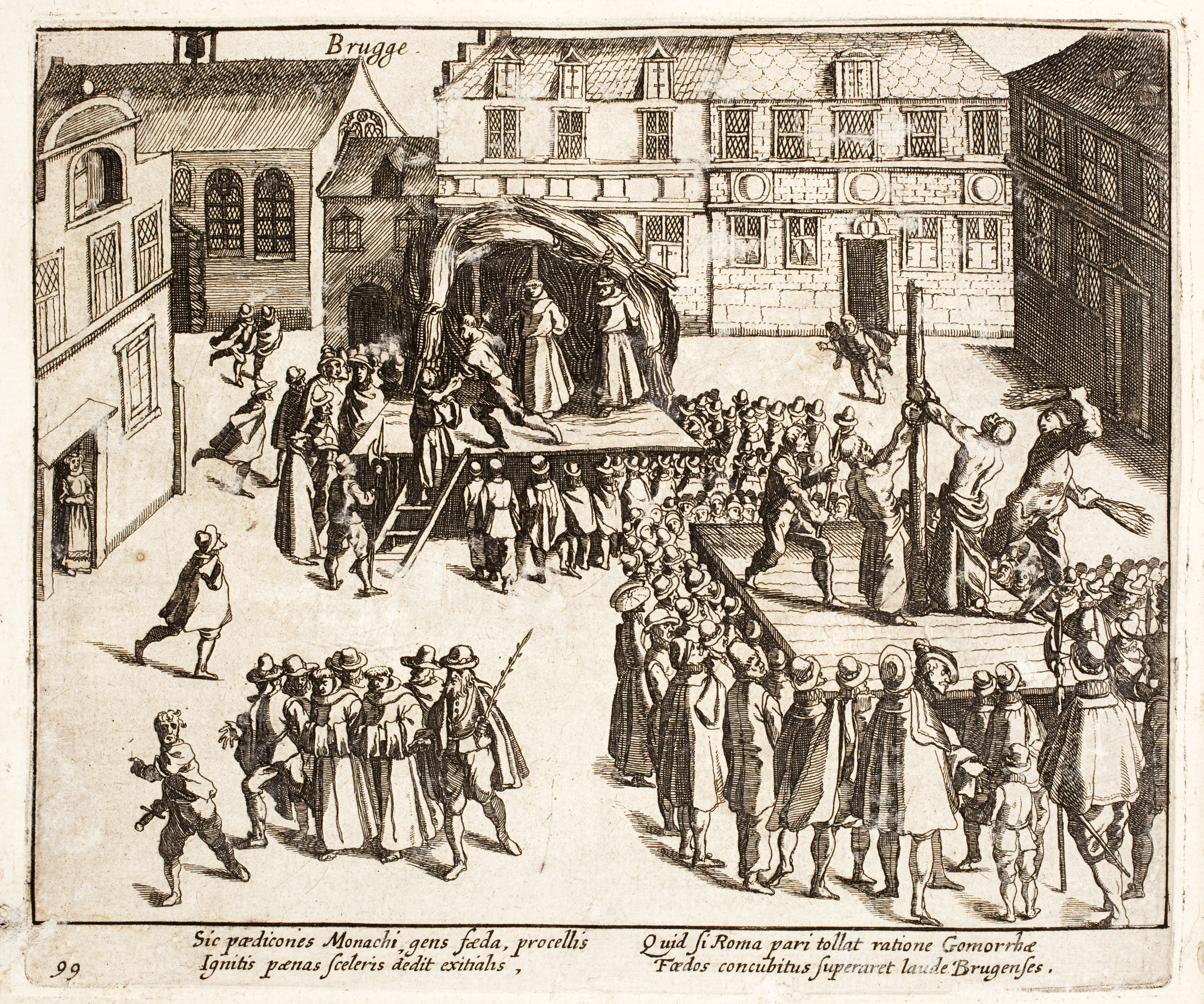
A 16th century illustration of the execution of five Franciscan friars through fire and torture for sodomy in Bruges, Belgium. July 26, 1578

From the 4th to 12th centuries, many harshly enacted laws and penal codes that strictly prohibited the practice of sodomy are enforced and reinforced throughout the entire European continent to prosecute and punish those who were found guilty for their criminal offense.

As far back as the 1st century, the ancient Germanic tribes frequently executed men who engaged in homosexual acts, as reported by Tacitus. The remains of such corpses have been found in Denmark and Northern Germany.

===== Roman Empire =====
During the Republican Era of Ancient Rome, the poorly attested Lex Scantinia penalized any adult male for committing a sex crime (stuprum) against an underage male citizen (ingenuus). It is unclear whether the penalty was death or a fine. The law may also have been used to prosecute adult male citizens who willingly took a receiving passive role in same-sex penetrative intercourse, but prosecutions are rarely recorded and the provisions of the law are vague; as John Boswell has noted. "If there was a law against carnally lustful relations between individuals of the same-sex, no one in around Cicero's time knew anything about it".

When the entire Roman Empire came under Christian rule beginning with the reign of Constantine the Great, all forms of sodomite activities between individuals (especially those of the same-sex) were increasingly repressed, often with the pain of death. In 342 CE, the Christian Roman emperors Constantius and Constans declared sodomite marriage to be illegal. Shortly after around the year 390 CE. The Roman emperors Valentinian II, Theodosius I and Arcadius declared all acts of sodomy to be an illegal criminal offense against the order of human nature in a civilized society and those who were found guilty of it are severely reprimanded and condemned to be publicly burned to death. Roman emperor Justinian I (527–565 CE) made sodomites a scapegoat for problems such as "famines, earthquakes, and pestilences."

===== Switzerland =====
The earliest known execution for sodomy was recorded in the annals of the city of Basel in 1277. The mention is only one sentence: "King Rudolph burned Lord Haspisperch for the vice of sodomy." The executed was an obscure member of the German-Swiss aristocracy; it is unknown if there was a political motivation behind the execution.

===== France and Florence =====
During the Middle Ages, the Kingdom of France and the City of Florence also instated the death penalty. In Florence, a young boy named Giovanni di Giovanni (1350–1365?) was castrated and burned between the thighs with a red-hot iron by court order under this law. These punishments continued into the Renaissance, and spread to the Swiss canton of Zürich. Knight Richard von Hohenberg (died 1482) was burned at the stake together with his lover, his young squire, during this time. In France, French writer Jacques Chausson (1618–1661) was also burned alive for attempting to seduce the son of a nobleman.

===== England =====
In England, the Buggery Act 1533 made sodomy and bestiality punishable by death. This act was superseded in 1828, but sodomy remained punishable by death under the new act until 1861, although the last executions were in 1835.

===== Malta =====
In seventeenth century Malta, Scottish voyager and author William Lithgow, writing in his diary in March 1616, claims a Spanish soldier and a Maltese teenage boy were publicly burnt to ashes for confessing to have practiced sodomy together. To escape this fate, Lithgow further claimed that a hundred bardassoes (boy prostitutes) sailed for Sicily the following day.

===== The Holocaust =====
In Nazi Germany and Occupied Europe, homosexuals and gender-nonconforming people were among the groups targeted during the Holocaust (See Persecution of homosexuals in Nazi Germany). In 1936, the poet Federico García Lorca was executed by right-wing rebels who established Franco's dictatorship in Spain.

=== Contemporary ===
Worldwide laws regarding same-sex intercourse, unions and expression. Same-sex intercourse legal. Recognition of unions: Marriage / Extraterritorial marriage^{2}; Civil unions / Limited domestic; Limited foreign / Optional certification; Same-sex intercourse illegal. Penalties: Death / Prison; death not enforced; Death under militias / Prison, with arrests or detention; Prison, not enforced^{1}; Same-sex intercourse Restricted/Ambiguous. Depends are: None / Restriction of expression, not enforced; Restriction of association with arrests or detention^{1}No imprisonment in the past three years or moratorium on law.^{2}Marriage not available locally. Some jurisdictions may perform other types of partnerships.

As of August 2025, 64 countries criminalize consensual sexual acts between adults of the same sex.

- Iran
- Brunei
- Afghanistan (fourth conviction)
- Mauritania
- Saudi Arabia
  - Although the maximum punishment for homosexuality is execution, the government tends to use other punishments (fines, prison sentence, and whipping), unless government officials think that homosexuals have challenged state authority by engaging in LGBT social movements.
- Somalia
- Uganda
- United Arab Emirates
- Yemen
- Parts of Nigeria (some states in Northern area)

53 countries where homosexual acts are criminalized but not punished by death, by region, include:

Africa

Algeria, Burundi, Cameroon, Chad, Comoros, Egypt, Eritrea, Eswatini, Ethiopia, Gambia, Ghana, Guinea, Kenya, Liberia, Libya, Malawi, Mali, Morocco, Nigeria (death penalty in some states), Senegal, Sierra Leone, South Sudan, Sudan, Tanzania, Togo, Tunisia, Uganda, Zambia, Zimbabwe

Asia

Bangladesh, Aceh (Indonesia), Iraq, Kuwait, Malaysia, Maldives, Myanmar, Oman, Pakistan, Sri Lanka, Syria, Turkmenistan, United Arab Emirates, Uzbekistan, Gaza Strip under Palestinian Authority

Caribbean

Grenada, Guyana, Jamaica, Saint Vincent and the Grenadines

Pacific Islands

Kiribati, Papua New Guinea, Samoa, Solomon Islands, Tonga, Tuvalu

Afghanistan, where such acts remain punishable with fines and a prison sentence, dropped the death penalty after the fall of the Taliban in 2001, who had mandated it from 1996. India criminalized homosexuality until September 6, 2018, when the Supreme Court of India declared section 377 of the Indian Penal Code invalid and arbitrary when it concerns consensual relations of consenting adults in private.

Jamaica has some of the toughest sodomy laws in the world, with homosexual activity carrying a ten-year jail sentence.

International human rights organizations such as Human Rights Watch and Amnesty International condemn laws that criminalize homosexual relations between consenting adults. Since 1994, the United Nations Human Rights Committee has also ruled that such laws violated the right to privacy guaranteed in the Universal Declaration of Human Rights and the International Covenant on Civil and Political Rights.

== Criminal assault ==
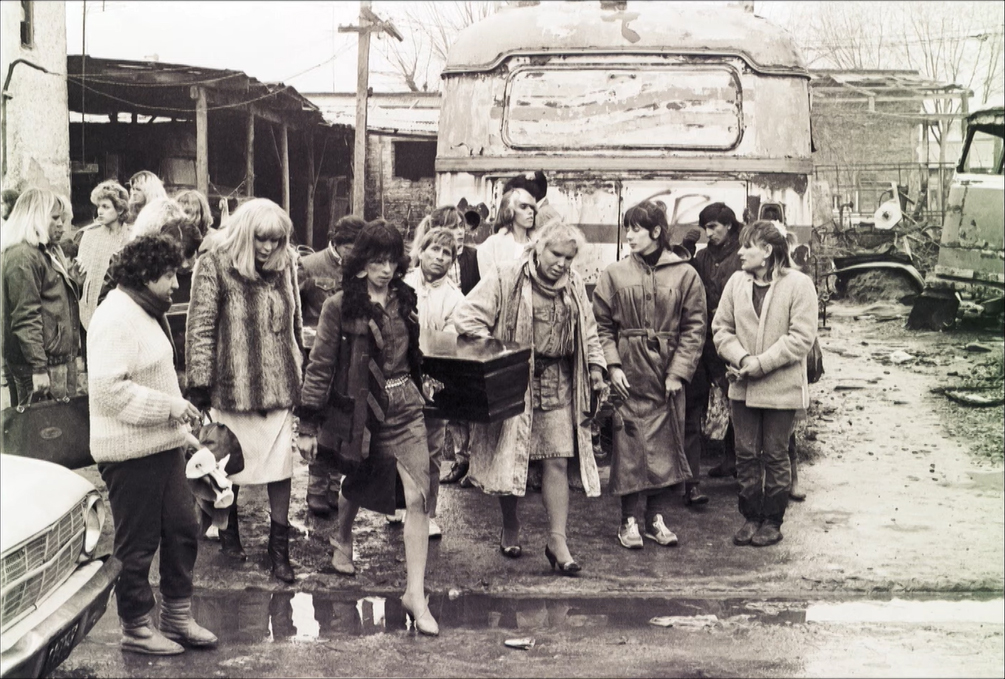
A group of Argentine travestis carrying the coffin of their murdered friend, August 1987.

Even in countries where homosexuality is legal (most countries outside of Africa and the Middle East), there are reports of homosexual people being targeted with bullying or physical assault or even homicide.

According to the Grupo Gay da Bahia (GGB), Brazil's oldest gay rights NGO, the rate of murders of homosexuals in Brazil is particularly high, with a reported 3,196 cases over the 30-year period of 1980 to 2009 (or about 0.7 cases per 100,000 population per annum). At least 387 LGBT Brazilians were murdered in 2017.

GGB reported 190 documented alleged homophobic murders in Brazil in 2008, accounting for about 0.5% of intentional homicides in Brazil (homicide rate 22 per 100,000 population as of 2008). 64% of the victims were gay men, 32% were trans women or transvestites, and 4% were lesbians. By comparison, the FBI reported five homophobic murders in the United States during 2008, corresponding to 0.03% of intentional homicides (homicide rate 5.4 per 100,000 population as of 2008).

The numbers produced by the Grupo Gay da Bahia (GGB) have occasionally been contested on the grounds that they include all murders of LGBT people reported in the media – that is, not only those motivated by bias against homosexuals. Reinaldo de Azevedo, in 2009, columnist of the right-wing Veja magazine, Brazil's most read weekly publication, called the GGB's methodology "unscientific" based on the above objection: that they make no distinction between murders motivated by bias and those that were not. On the high level of murders of transsexuals, he suggested transsexuals' allegedly high involvement with the drug trade may expose them to higher levels of violence as compared to non-transgender homosexuals and heterosexuals.

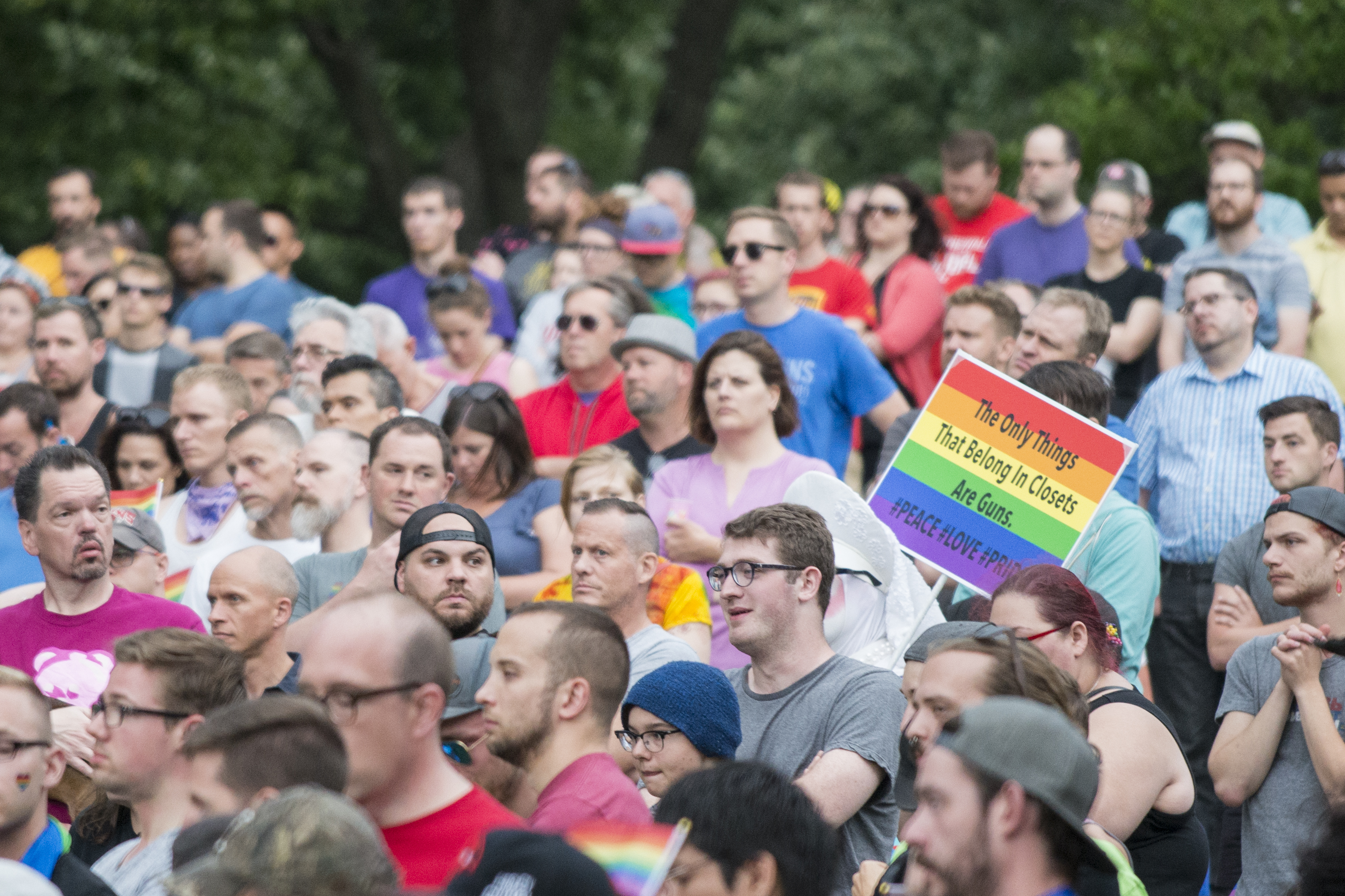
Vigil held in Minneapolis for victims of the Orlando nightclub shooting

In many parts of the world, including much of the European Union and United States, acts of violence are legally classified as hate crimes, which entail harsher sentences if convicted. In some countries, this form of legislation extends to verbal abuse as well as physical violence.

Violent hate crimes against LGBT people tend to be especially brutal, even compared to other hate crimes: "an intense rage is present in nearly all homicide cases involving gay male victims". It is rare for a victim to just be shot; he is more likely to be stabbed multiple times, mutilated, and strangled. "They frequently involved torture, cutting, mutilation... showing the absolute intent to rub out the human being because of his (sexual) preference". In a particularly brutal case in the United States, on March 14, 2007, in Wahneta, Florida, 25-year-old Ryan Keith Skipper was found dead from 20 stab wounds and a slit throat. His body had been dumped on a dark, rural road less than 2 miles from his home. His two alleged attackers, William David Brown Jr., 20, and Joseph Eli Bearden, 21, were indicted for robbery and first-degree murder. Highlighting their malice and contempt for the victim, the accused killers allegedly drove around in Skipper's blood-soaked car and bragged of killing him. According to a sheriff's department affidavit, one of the men stated that Skipper was targeted because "he was a faggot."

In Canada in 2008, police-reported data found that approximately 10% of all hate crimes in the country were motivated by sexual orientation. Of these, 56% were of a violent nature. In comparison, 38% of all racially motivated offenses were of a violent nature.

In the same year in the United States, according to Federal Bureau of Investigation data, though 4,704 crimes were committed due to racial bias and 1,617 were committed due to sexual orientation, only one murder and one forcible rape were committed due to racial bias, whereas five murders and six rapes were committed based on sexual orientation. In Northern Ireland in 2008, 160 homophobic incidents and 7 transphobic incidents were reported. Of those incidents, 68.4% were violent crimes; significantly higher than for any other bias category. By contrast, 37.4% of racially motivated crimes were of a violent nature.

People's ignorance of and prejudice against LGBT people can contribute to the spreading of misinformation about them and subsequently to violence. In 2018, a transgender woman was killed by a mob in Hyderabad, India, following false rumors that transgender women were sex trafficking children. Three other transgender women were injured in the attack.

Recent research on university-level students indicated the importance of queer visibility and its impact in creating a positive experience for LGBTIQ+ members of a campus community, this can reduce the impact and effect of incidents on youth attending university. When there is a poor climate – students are much less likely to report incidents or seek help.

=== Violence at universities ===
In the United States since the early 2010s, colleges and universities have taken major steps to prevent sexual harassment from taking place on campus, but students have still reported violence due to their sexual orientation. Sexual harassment can include "non-contact forms" such as making jokes or comments and "contact forms" like forcing students to commit sexual acts. Even though little information exists with LGBT violence taking place at higher learning institutions, different communities are taking a stand against the violence. Many LGBT rape survivors said they experienced their first assault before the age of 25, and that many arrive on campus with this experience. Almost half of bisexual women experience their first assault between the ages of 18 and 24, and most of these take place unreported on college campuses. In 2012, though the Federal Bureau of Investigation changed what the "federal" definition of what rape means (for reporting purposes), local state governments still determine how campus violence cases are treated. Catherine Hill and Elana Silva said in Drawing the Line: Sexual Harassment on Campus, "Students who admit to harassing other students generally don't see themselves as rejected suitors, rather misunderstood comedians." Most students who commit sexual violence towards other students do it to boost their own ego, believing that their actions are humorous. More than 46% of sexual harassment towards LGBT people still goes unreported. National resources have been created to deal with the issue of sexual violence and various organizations such as The American Association of University Women and the National Center on Domestic and Sexual Violence are established to provide information and resources for those who have been sexually harassed.

=== Legislation against homophobic hate crimes ===
Members of the Organization for Security and Cooperation in Europe began describing hate crimes based on sexual orientation (as opposed to generic anti-discrimination legislation) to be counted as aggravating circumstance in the commission of a crime in 2003.

==== Australia ====
Following a spate of murders of gay men in the 1980s and 1990s, significant advances have been made. Hate speech laws in Australia provide protection in all states against racial vilification, with some additional protections on the grounds of sexual orientation in New South Wales, Queensland, the Australian Capital Territory and Tasmania. In New South Wales, 'homosexual vilification' is prohibited under the umbrella of the Anti-Discrimination Act 1977. In 2011, the Australian Human Rights Commission had reported that there was no federal law protecting LGBT+ Australians from discrimination or vilification. However, with the legalisation of same-sex marriage in Australia in 2017, and sexual orientation anti-discrimination protections in all states, LGBT rights in Australia are now among the most progressive in the world.

==== Scotland ====
In 2009, Scotland passed the Offences (Aggravation by Prejudice (Scotland) Act, which made acts of prejudice against Disability, Sexual Orientation and Transgender Status specific offences. This Act requires only a single source of evidence, and those convicted under it must be told upon sentencing both what their sentence will be and what it would have been had prejudice not been a factor.

In July 2017, James Chalmers and Fiona Leverick of the University of Glasgow, submitted their report A Comparative Analysis of Hate Crime Legislation to the Hate Crime Legislation Review which contributed to the Scottish government's publication of its final report Independent review of hate crime legislation in Scotland in May 2018.

While homophobia is still an issue in modern Scotland, particularly in schools, social attitudes towards LGBT+ persons have changed significantly, helped by every Scottish political party leader being vocally in support of equal marriage throughout that campaign. Former leaders of both Scottish Labour and the Scottish Conservatives have been "out" lesbians and current co-leader of the Scottish Greens, Patrick Harvie is openly gay. In the UK Parliament, as of March 2023, Westminster MP for Livingstone, West Lothian, Hannah Bardell was one of 62 "out" LGBT politicians in the United Kingdom.

==== USA ====
The United States does not have federal legislation marking sexual orientation as criterion for hate crimes, but several states, including the District of Columbia, enforce harsher penalties for crimes where real or perceived sexual orientation may have been a motivator. Among these 12 countries as well, only the United States has criminal law that specifically mentions gender identity, and even then only in 11 states and the District of Columbia. In November 2010, the United Nations General Assembly voted 79–70 to remove "sexual orientation" from the Special Rapporteur on Extrajudicial, Summary or Arbitrary Executions, a list of unjustified reasons for executions, replacing it with "discriminatory reasons on any basis". The resolution specifically mentions a large number of groups, including race, religion, linguistic differences, refugees, street children and indigenous peoples.

Legal and police response to these types of hate crimes is hard to gauge, however. Lack of reporting by authorities on the statistics of these crimes and under-reporting by the victims themselves are factors for this difficulty. Often a victim will not report a crime as it will shed unwelcome light on their orientation and invite more victimization.

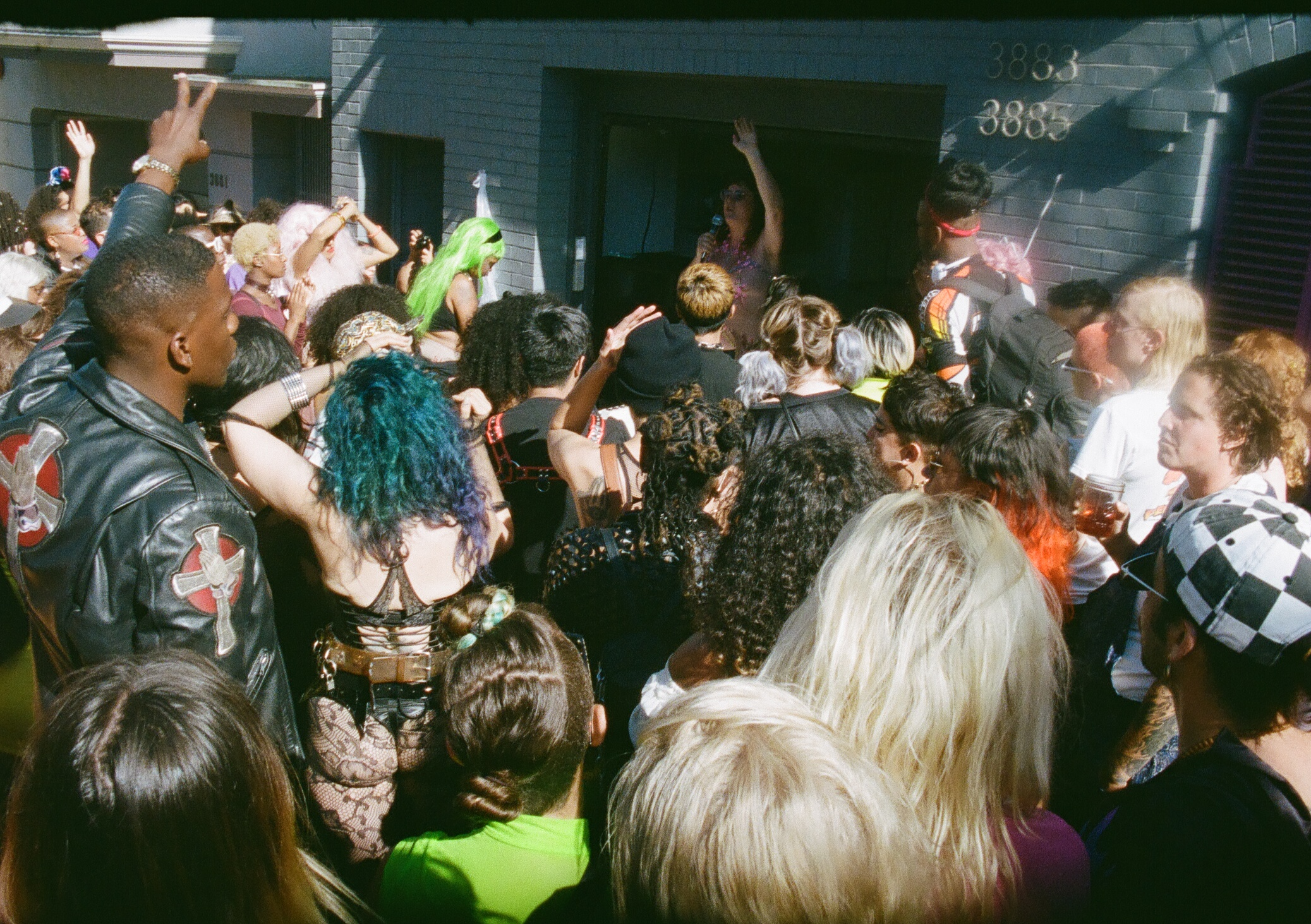
A speaker leads a sizable crowd in a spoken word, call and response, memorial dedicated to trans women who have been murdered. This memorial happened at the SF Dyke March, June 2019.

=== Alleged judicative bias ===
"It's pretty disturbing that somebody that [kills] a person in cold blood gets out very quickly…."

— Canadian MLA Spencer Herbert

The Gay Panic Defense has at times been adduced to plea for more lenient punishments for people accused of assaulting or killing homosexuals because of their actual or perceived orientation. This defense posits that the attacker was so enraged by their victim's alleged advances as to cause temporary insanity, rendering them unable to stop themselves. If the loss of faculties is proven, or sympathized to the jury, a sentence may be mitigated. In several common law countries, the mitigatory defense of provocation has been used in violent attacks against LGBT persons, which has led Australian states progressively to abolish the Gay Panic Defense, now effective nationwide.

People convicted of violence against LGBT people have in several cases received shorter sentences under the Gay Panic Defense plea:

- On September 30, 1997, Kenneth Brewer met Stephen Bright at a local gay bar, where he bought the younger man drinks and they later went back to Brewer's apartment. While there, Brewer made a sexual advance toward Bright, who then beat him to death. Bright was initially charged with second-degree murder, but he was eventually convicted of third-degree assault and was sentenced to one year in prison.
- In 2001, Aaron Webster was beaten to death by a group of youths armed with baseball bats and a pool cue while in an area of Stanley Park frequented by gay men. Ryan Cran was convicted of manslaughter in the case in 2004 and released on parole in 2009 after serving 4 years of his six-year sentence. Two youths were tried under Canada's Youth Criminal Justice Act and sentenced to three years after pleading guilty. A fourth assailant was acquitted.

There have also been criticisms concerning the impartiality of judges. In 1988 in Texas, in handing down a 30-year sentence to a man for killing two gay men, instead of the life sentence requested by the prosecutor, Judge Jack Hampton said: "I don't much care for queers cruising the streets picking up teenage boys ...[I] put prostitutes and gays at about the same level ... and I'd be hard put to give somebody life for killing a prostitute."

In 1987, a Florida judge trying a case concerning the beating to death of a gay man asked the prosecutor, "That's a crime now, to beat up a homosexual?" The prosecutor responded, "Yes, sir. And it's also a crime to kill them." "Times have really changed," the judge replied. The judge, Daniel Futch, maintained that he was joking, but was removed from the case.

=== Attacks on gay pride parades ===
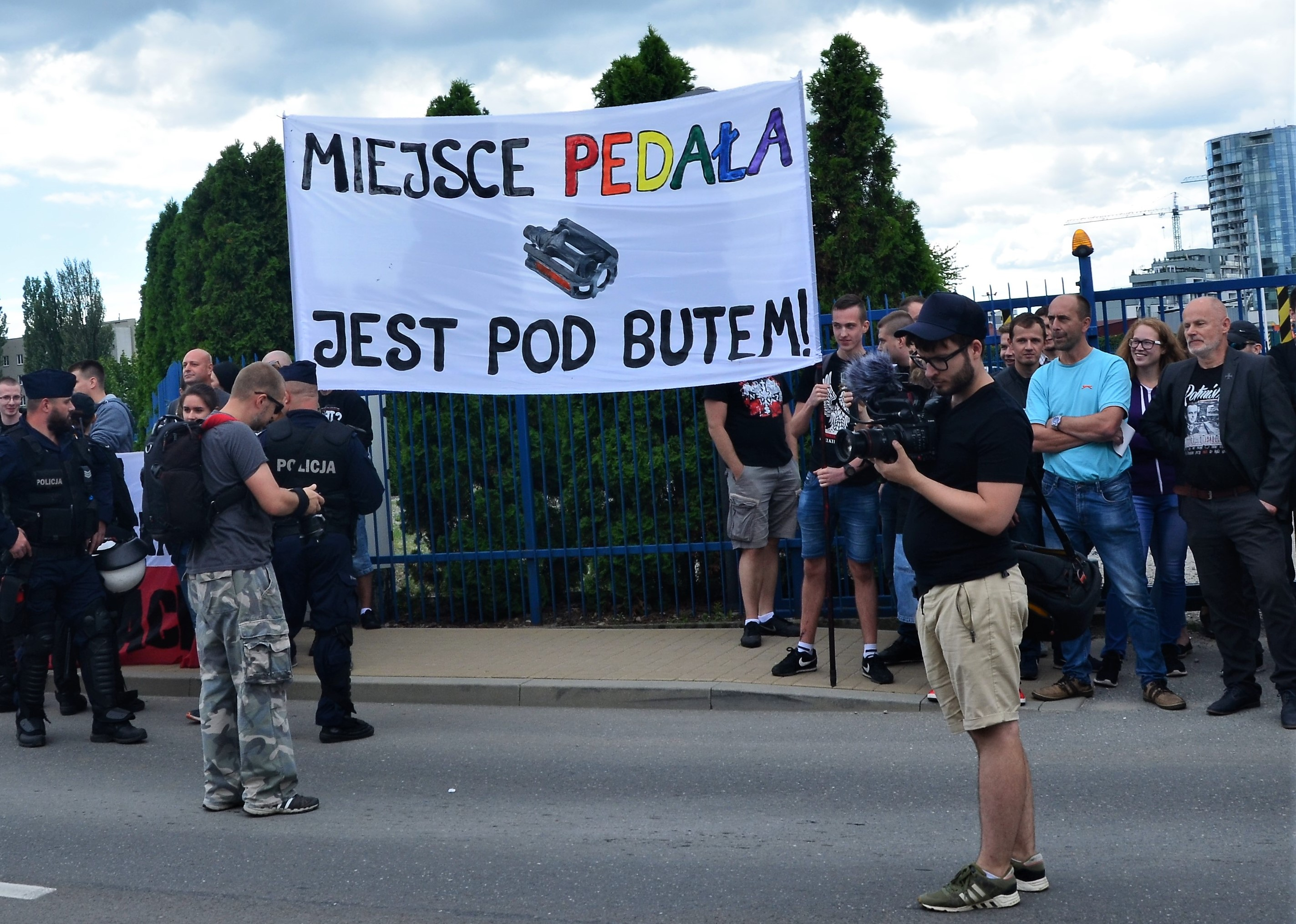
Counter-protesters against the 2019 equality march in Rzeszów: "fag's place is under the boot!"

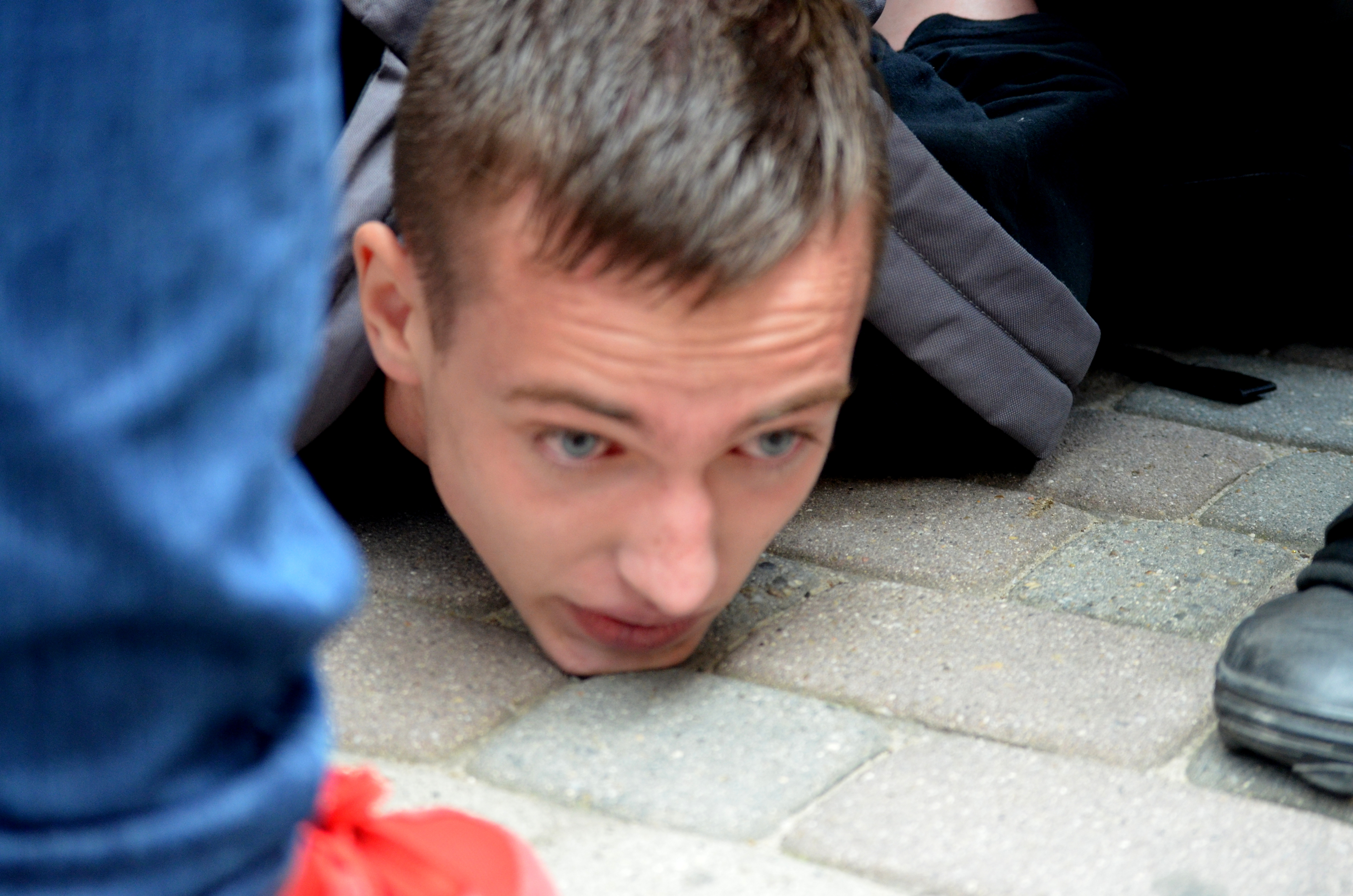
Radical right demonstrators attack participant in Rzeszów equality march 2018

Far-rightists attack an Athenian pride parade by egging and throwing yoghurt.

LGBT Pride Parades in East European, Asian and South American countries often attract violence because of their public nature. Though many countries where such events take place attempt to provide police protection to participants, some would prefer that the parades not happen, and police either ignore or encourage violent protesters. The country of Moldova has shown particular contempt to marchers, shutting down official requests to hold parades and allowing protesters to intimidate and harm any who try to march anyway. In 2007, after being denied a request to hold a parade, a small group of LGBT people tried to hold a small gathering. They were surrounded by a group twice their size who shouted derogatory things at them and pelted them with eggs. The gathering proceeded even so, and they tried to lay flowers at the Monument to the Victims of Repression. They were denied the opportunity, however, by a large group of police claiming they needed permission from city hall.

The following year, a parade was again attempted. A bus carried approximately 60 participants to the capital, but before they could disembark, an angry crowd surrounded the bus. They shouted things like "let's get them out and beat them up", and "beat them to death, don't let them escape" at the frightened passengers. The mob told the activists that if they wanted to leave the bus unharmed, they would have to destroy all of their pride materials. The passengers complied and the march was called off. All the while, police stood passively about 100 meters away, taking no action even though passengers claimed at least nine emergency calls were made to police while on the bus.

Russia's officials are similarly averse to Pride Parades. Mayor of Moscow Yury Luzhkov has repeatedly banned marches, calling them "satanic". Pride participants instead tried to peacefully assemble and deliver a petition to city hall regarding the right of assembly and freedom of expression. They were met by skinheads and other protesters, and police who had closed off the square and immediately arrested activists as they entered. As some were being arrested, other participants were attacked by protesters. Police did nothing. Around eleven women and two men were arrested and left in the heat, denied medical attention, and verbally abused by police officers. The officers told the women, "No one needs lesbians, no one will ever get you out of here." When participants were released from custody hours later, they were pelted by eggs and shouted at by protesters who had been waiting.

Hungary, in contrast, has tried to afford the best protection they can to marchers, but cannot stem the flow of violence. In 2008, hundreds of people participated in the Budapest Dignity March. Police, on alert due to attacks on two LGBT-affiliated businesses earlier in the week, erected high metal barriers on either side of the street the march was to take place on. Hundreds of angry protesters threw petrol bombs and rocks at police in retaliation. A police van was set on fire and two police officers were injured in the attacks. During the parade itself, protesters threw Molotov cocktails, eggs and firecrackers at marchers. At least eight participants were injured. Forty-five people were detained in connection with the attacks, and observers called the incident "the worst violence during the dozen years the Gay Pride Parade has taken place in Budapest".

In Israel, three marchers in a gay pride parade in Jerusalem on June 30, 2005, were stabbed by Yishai Shlisel, a Haredi Jew. Shlisel claimed he had acted "in the name of God". He was charged with attempted murder. Ten years later, On July 30, 2015, six marchers were injured, again by Yishai Shlisel when he stabbed them. It was three weeks after he was released from jail. One of the victims, 16-year-old Shira Banki, died of her wounds at the Hadassah Medical Center three days later, on August 2, 2015. Shortly after, Prime Minister Netanyahu offered his condolences, adding "We will deal with the murderer to the fullest extent of the law."

In 2019, the gay pride parade in Detroit was infiltrated by armed neo-nazis who reportedly claimed they wanted to spark "Charlottesville 2.0" referring to the Unite the Right demonstration in 2017 which resulted in the murder of Heather Heyer, and many others injured.

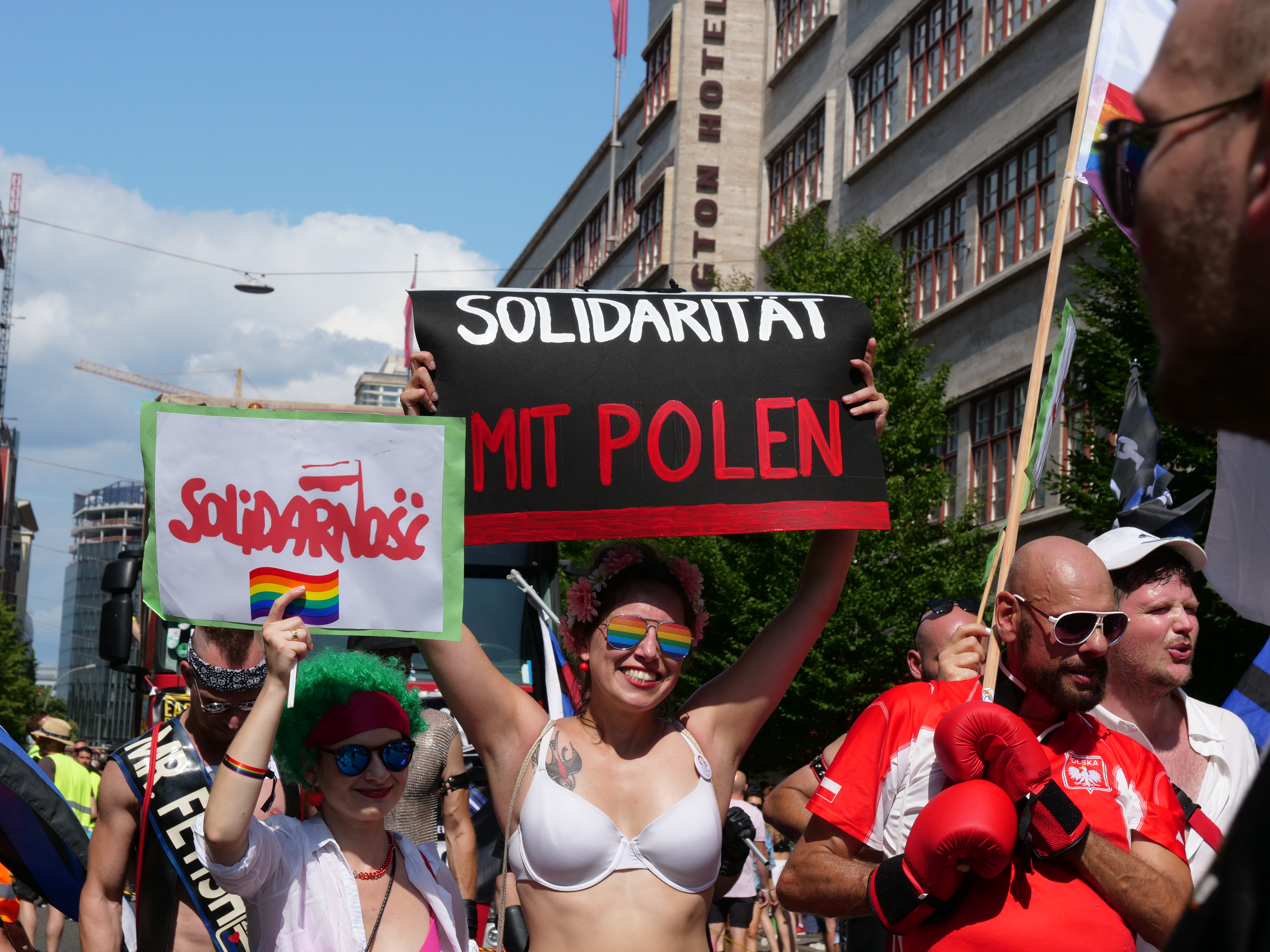
Marcher in 2019 Christopher Street Day 2019 march holding up Solidarity sign with Poland, following Białystok attack

On July 20, 2019, the first Białystok equality march was held in Białystok, a Law and Justice party stronghold, surrounded by Białystok county which is a declared LGBT-free zone. Two weeks before the march Archbishop Tadeusz Wojda delivered a proclamation to all churches in Podlaskie Voivodeship and Białystok stating that pride marches were "blasphemy against God". Wojda also asserted that the march was "foreign" and thanked those who "defend Christian values". Approximately a thousand pride marchers were opposed by thousands of members of far-right groups, ultra football fans, and others. Firecrackers were tossed at the marchers, homophobic slogans were chanted, and the marchers were pelted with rocks and bottles. Dozens of marchers were injured. Amnesty International criticized the police response, saying they had failed to protect marchers and "failed to respond to instances of violence". According to the New York Times, similar to the manner in which the Unite the Right rally in Charlottesville shocked Americans, the violence in Białystok raised public concern in Poland over anti-LGBT propaganda.

=== Violent ambushes ===
The use of fake profiles on dating apps by homophobic predators to entrap and assault LGBTQ people is common in various countries.

A 2023 report by Human Rights Watch documents the widespread use of fake profiles on digital platforms by police to entrap, extort money from, or physically torture LGBTQ people in Egypt, Iraq, Jordan, Lebanon, and Tunisia.

=== Advocacy in song lyrics ===
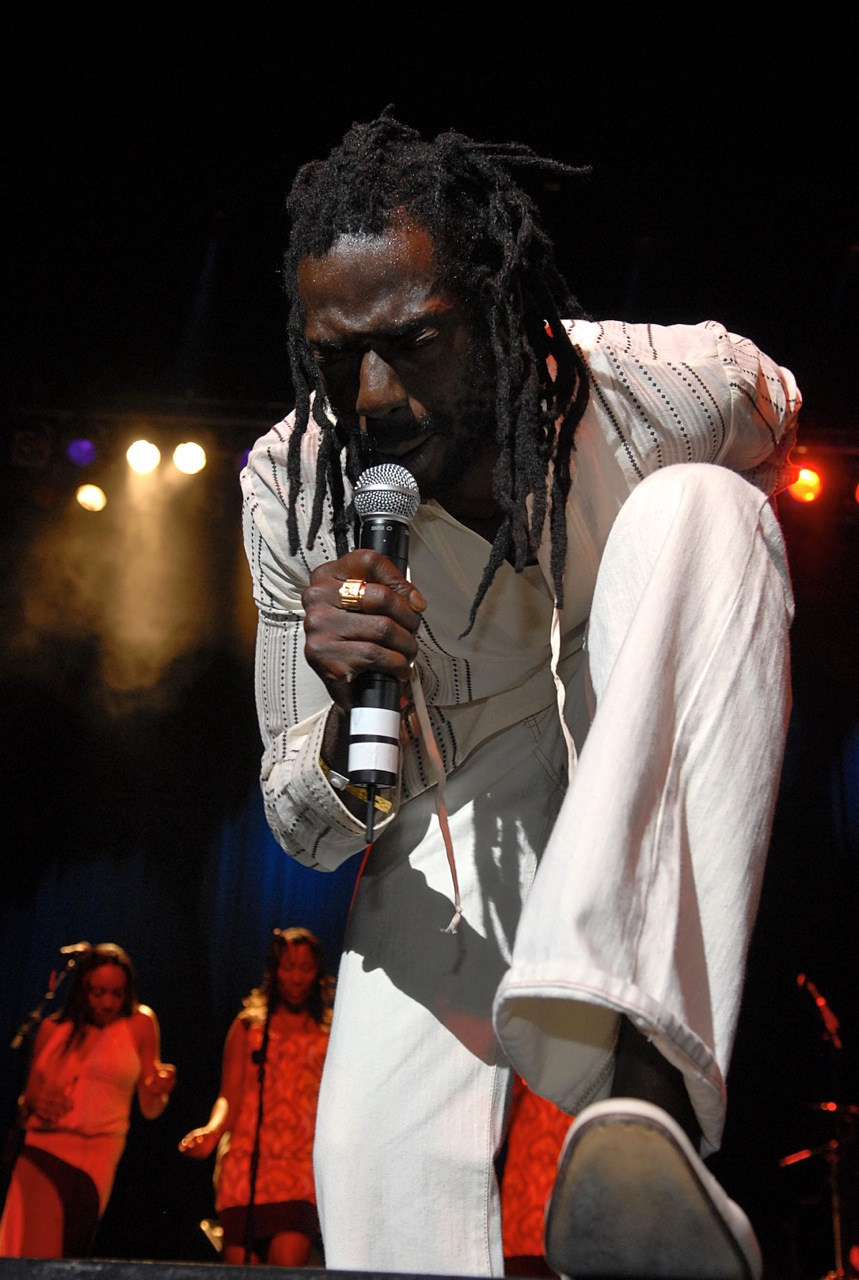
Buju Banton, a Jamaican musician, performing in 2007

As a result of the strong anti-homosexual culture in Jamaica, many reggae and dancehall artists, such as Buju Banton, Elephant Man, Sizzla, have published song lyrics advocating violence against homosexuals. Similarly, hip-hop music occasionally includes aggressively homophobic lyrics, but has since appeared to reform.

Banton wrote a song when he was 15 years old that became a hit when he released it years later in 1992 called "Boom Bye Bye". The song is about murdering homosexuals and "advocated the shooting of gay men, pouring acid on them and burning them alive." A song by Elephant Man proclaims: "When you hear a lesbian getting raped/It's not our fault ... Two women in bed/That's two sodomites who should be dead."

Canadian activists have sought to deport reggae artists from the country due to homophobic content in some of their songs, which they say promote anti-gay violence. In the UK, Scotland Yard has investigated reggae lyrics and Sizzla was barred from entering the United Kingdom in 2004 over accusations his music promotes murder.

Gay rights advocates have started the group Stop Murder Music to combat what they say is the promotion of hate and violence by artists. The group organized protests, causing some venues to refuse to allow the targeted artists to perform, and the loss of sponsors. In 2007, the group asked reggae artists to promise "not to produce music or make public statements inciting hatred against gay people. Neither can they authorise the re-release of previous homophobic songs." Several artists signed that agreement, including Buju Banton, Beenie Man, Sizzla and Capleton, but some later denied signing it.

During the 1980s, skinheads in North America who promoted emerging neo-Nazi pop culture and racist rock songs increasingly went to punk rock concerts with anti-gay music advocating violence.

== Motivations ==
=== Macho culture and social homophobia ===
The vast majority of homophobic criminal assault is perpetrated by male aggressors on male victims, and is connected to aggressive heterosexual machismo or male chauvinism. Theorists including Calvin Thomas and Judith Butler have suggested that homophobia can be rooted in an individual's fear of being identified as gay. Homophobia in men is correlated with insecurity about masculinity. For this reason, allegedly homophobia is rampant in sports, and in the subculture of its supporters, that are considered stereotypically "male", such as football and rugby.

These theorists have argued that a person who expresses homophobia does so not only to communicate their beliefs about the class of gay people, but also to distance themselves from this class and its social status. Thus, by distancing themselves from gay people, they are reaffirming their role as a heterosexuals in a heteronormative culture, thereby attempting to prevent themselves from being labeled and treated as a gay person.

Various psychoanalytic theories explain homophobia as a threat to an individual's own same-sex impulses, whether those impulses are imminent or merely hypothetical. This threat causes repression, denial or reaction formation.

==== Islam ====
The Quran cites the story of the "people of Lot" (also known as the people of Sodom and Gomorrah), destroyed by the wrath of Allah because they engaged in lustful carnal acts between men.

The most followed Scholars of Islam, such as Shaykh al-Islām Imam Malik, and Imam Shafi among others, ruled that Islam disallows male homosexuality and ordained capital punishment for a person guilty of it.

The legal punishment for male sodomy has varied among juristic schools: some prescribe capital punishment; while other prescribe a milder discretionary punishment. Homosexual activity is a crime and forbidden in most Muslim-majority countries. In some relatively secular Muslim-majority countries such as Indonesia, Jordan and Turkey, this is not the case, however social persecution such as honor killings are widespread of cis-gendered gay men and sometimes lesbians.

The Quran, much like the Bible and Torah, has a vague condemnation of homosexuality and how it should be dealt with, leaving it ambiguous. For this reason, Islamic jurists have turned to the collections of the hadith (sayings of Muhammad) and Sunnah (accounts of his life). These, in contrast, are perfectly clear and particularly harsh.

Ibn al-Jawzi records Muhammad as cursing sodomites in several hadith, and recommending the death penalty for both the active and passive partners in same-sex acts.

Muhammad prescribed the death penalty for both the active and the passive male homosexual partners, which is a clear condemnation of male homosexuality within Islam, and the association with male homosexuality being associated with a cursed action has produced a long history of religiously condoned and sanctioned violence against gay men:

Narrated by Abdullah ibn Abbas: "The Prophet said: 'If you find anyone doing as Lot's people did, kill the one who does it, and the one to whom it is done'."

— Sunan Abu Dawood, 38:4447, Al-Tirmidhi, 17:1456, Ibn Maajah, 20:2561

Narrated Abdullah ibn Abbas: "If a man who is not married is seized committing sodomy he will be stoned to death."

— Sunan Abu Dawood, 38:4448

Ibn al-Jawzi (1114–1200), writing in the 12th century, claimed that Muhammad had cursed "sodomites" in several hadith, and had recommended the death penalty for both the active and passive partners in homosexual acts.

It was narrated that Ibn Abbas said: "The Prophet said: '... cursed is the one who does the action of the people of Lot'."

— Musnad Ahmad:1878

Ahmad narrated from Ibn Abbas that the Prophet of Allah said: 'May Allah curse the one who does the action of the people of Lot, may Allah curse the one who does the action of the people of Lot', three times."

— Musnad Ahmad: 2915

Al-Nuwayri (1272–1332), writing in the 13th century, reported in his Nihaya that Muhammad is "alleged to have said what he feared most for his community were the practices of the people of Lot (he seems to have expressed the same idea in regard to wine and female seduction)."

It was narrated that Jabir: "The Prophet said: 'There is nothing I fear for my followers more than the deed of the people of Lot.'"

— Al-Tirmidhi: 1457, Ibn Maajah: 2563

The overall moral or theological principle is that a person who performs such actions challenges the harmony of God's creation, and is therefore a revolt against God.

These views vary depending upon sect. It is noteworthy to point out that Quranists (those who do not integrate the aforementioned Hadiths into their belief system) do not advocate capital punishment, while still condemning male homosexuality as an abomination and major sin.

Most imams within the Sunni and Shia branches still preach views stating that homosexual males should be executed under Islamic law. These are also followed up by executions in Islamic countries, and lynchings, honor killings, and hate crimes within Muslim communities in non-Islamic countries. Abu Usamah at Green Lane Mosque in Birmingham defended his words to followers by saying "If I were to call homosexuals perverted, dirty, filthy dogs who should be executed, that's my freedom of speech, isn't it?"

Other contemporary Islamic views are that the "crime of homosexuality is one of the greatest of crimes, the worst of sins and the most abhorrent of deeds". Homosexuality is considered the 11th major sin in Islam, in the days of the companions of Muhammad, a slave boy was once forgiven for killing his master who sodomized him.

The 2016 Orlando nightclub shooting was at the time the deadliest mass shooting by an individual and remains the deadliest incident of violence against LGBT people in U.S. history. On June 12, 2016, Omar Mateen killed 49 people and wounded more than 50 at Pulse gay nightclub in Orlando, Florida. The act has been described by investigators as an Islamic terrorist attack and a hate crime.

== See also ==
Prejudicial attitudes

- Anti-LGBTQ rhetoric
- Heterosexism
- LGBTQ stereotypes

Violence

- Corrective rape
- List of acts of violence against LGBTQ people
- Suicide among LGBTQ youth
- Belize violence against LGBTQ people
- UK violence against LGBTQ people
- US violence against LGBTQ people
- US LGBTQ youth homelessness

See also

- Brandon Teena
- Matthew Shepard
- Gwen Araujo
- Killing of Ali Fazeli Monfared
- Killing of Brianna Ghey
- Hamed Sabouri
- Westboro Baptist Church
- Faithful Word Baptist Church
- Admiral Duncan pub bombing
- Communism and LGBTQ rights
- The Yogyakarta Principles
- Trust and safety issues in online dating services
- LGBTQ people in prison
- Education sector responses to LGBTQ violence
- Security of person
