= Human rights in Kiribati =

Human rights in Kiribati are protected under the country’s current constitution and laws, alongside commitments made as a member of various international organizations and party to relevant treaties. In contrast, however, Kiribati has faced scrutiny over its limited ratification of the core global human-rights treaties. Review of Kiribati's human rights situation highlighted ongoing challenges such as the impacts of climate change, access to justice, and the rights of women and children.

== International human rights instruments ==
Kiribati is a member of the United Nations and has also ratified the Convention on the Elimination of All Forms of Discrimination Against Women (CEDAW), the Convention on the Rights of the Child (CRC) and the Convention on the Rights of Persons with Disabilities (CRPD). Reservations were made with respect to articles 24 (b) – (f), 26 and 28 (b)-(d) of the CRC concerning a child's rights to health including safe drinking water, social security and education as well as a declaration that the definition of child's rights in certain articles would be exercised in accordance with traditional custom regarding the child's place in a family. Recommendations to withdraw these reservations and declaration are yet to be enacted.

There has been international concern that Kiribati has only ratified three of the seven core international human rights treaties, in particular the International Covenant on Civil and Political Rights (ICCPR) and the International Covenant on Economic, Social and Cultural Rights (ICESCR). It has also been noted in various submissions to the Human Rights Council that Kiribati is behind on reporting obligations to CEDAW and the CRC.

== Constitutional protection of rights ==
The Constitution of Kiribati came into force in 1979 and was revised in 1980. It provides for the protection of fundamental human rights, including:

- Protection of right to life (section 3)
- Protection of right to personal liberty (section 4)
- Protection from slavery and forced labour (section 5)
- Protection from inhuman treatment (section 6)
- Protection from deprivation of property (section 7)
- Protection for privacy of home and other property (section 8)
- Provisions to secure protection of the law (section 9)
- Protection of freedom of conscience (section 10)
- Protection of freedom of expression (section 11)
- Protection of freedom of assembly and association (section 12)
- Protection of freedom of movement (section 13)
- Protection from discrimination on the grounds of race, etc. (section 13).

Notably, while there is a provision providing protection from discrimination on the grounds of race and political opinion, there is no protection from discrimination on the basis of gender, sexual orientation or disability. The government has tried to amend the constitution to provide for non-discrimination on the grounds of sex or gender, however it did not achieve the required 2/3 majority. While the constitution provides for the protection of fundamental rights and freedoms, like most countries, they are subject to certain qualifications and limitations. In particular, Kiribati's customary laws are given recognition in the Courts.

== Human Rights Council Universal Periodic Review 2010 ==
The Human Rights Council in its Eighth session of the Working Group on the Universal Periodic Review issued a report on Kiribati, following a Universal Periodic Review (UPR) of Kiribati which took place in 2010. It was acknowledged in this report that Kiribati faces a number of challenges and constraints with regards to human rights, these including the effects of climate change, the rights of women and children, developmental challenges and access to justice. Notwithstanding these challenges it was also noted that Kiribati has a clear constitutional and legal framework and that there have been achievements in certain areas such as in education and addressing the impact of climate change, for example through the Environment Amendment Act (2007).

== Right to water and sanitation ==
The rights to water and sanitation derive from the right to an adequate standard of living, recognised in the Universal Declaration of Human Rights, CRC and CEDAW – all of which Kiribati is party to. The government of Kiribati introduced the National Water Resources Policy in 2008 which was supplemented by the introduction of the National Sanitation Policy (NSP) in 2010. The NSP acknowledges that water supply and resource issues in Kiribati are some of the most complex in the world due to a combination of factors including the density of population and the impact of climate change. Both policies contain forty priority issues that required short term attention and an additional twenty-seven requiring attention within the next decade. These policies were criticised by the UN Special Rapporteur in the 2012 Special Report on the human right to drinking water and sanitation in Kiribati. She considered them to be over ambitious and unfocused, with the need for a clear legal framework to be implemented in the country to give national ownership to the issues.

In its submission to the UN Universal Periodic Review, Amnesty International identified overcrowding as the key cause of poor sanitation and drinking water shortages in Kiribati. As Kiribati is one of the most densely populated areas in the world there is increased stress on both infrastructure and resources, making management of water and sanitation a challenge in the country. Data shows that sixty-five percent of people in Kiribati have access to an improved water source and thirty-three percent to improved sanitation. This low level of sanitation is part of the reason for high disease rates and illness, for example the chance of a person having diarrhoea is four hundred percent more likely in Kiribati than in Australia or New Zealand, water borne diseases are increasingly common, outbreaks of typhoid occur annually and the country has the highest infant mortality rate in the Pacific region.

It has also been acknowledged that as one of the world's least developed countries, Kiribati has limited capacity to fully address the situation and issues of international obligations of other states to respect the rights to water and sanitation in other countries may be a contributing factor to the broader issues faced by Kiribati, particularly in relation to climate change. The effects of climate change are a reality for people's everyday life in the country and it is the effects of climate change coupled with inaction by the State and international community that have led to the denial of rights.

== Rights of women and children ==
=== Women’s rights ===
The protection of women remains a sensitive issue within the nation and this is largely due to the cultural and social structures that exist within Kiribati. The discrimination provision of the Bill of Rights does not prohibit discrimination on the basis of gender or sex, effectively meaning that discrimination against women is lawful in Kiribati [24]. Customary law is given constitutional status which often allows for discrimination against women, this is particularly due to traditions which hold women as inferior to men in Kiribati society. Land inheritance and custody laws were considered particularly discriminatory by Amnesty International in its submission to the Human Rights Council. Citizenship laws in Kiribati were also criticised as discriminatory against women. For example, the Citizenship Act 1979 provides that a Kiribati woman who marries a foreigner and moves to that country can only regain citizenship if that marriage breaks down, whereas a Kiribati man who does the same can regain citizenship at any time. Awareness of women's rights has increased over recent years within the country; particularly in relation to domestic violence with the formation of the Kiribati Women Activists Network (K-Wan).

=== Domestic violence ===
While there are laws in place which make rape and all forms of assault illegal, there are no laws against domestic violence specifically and prosecutions are treated as offences warranting prosecution under the Penal Code of Kiribati. As gender roles are strictly defined and used as a justification for the negative treatment of women which has meant that women generally refuse to report or share any violence issues with formal authorities. In addition to this progress has been made with the ratification of CEDAW and in 2011 the government introduced an action plan for the elimination of gender based violence. It has been acknowledged by the government that there are some domestic laws in the country which do not comply with CEDAW. Measures have been taken by the government in an attempt to address these issues surrounding violence. In 2010 the Kiribati Health and Support Study: A Study on Violence Against Women was published showing there were high levels of violence against women in Kiribati, with 68% of women surveyed having experienced some form of domestic violence in 2008.

=== Sexual exploitation of children ===
The law of Kiribati prohibits the exploitation of children in the sex industry with the procurement of any girl under 18 for prostitution being prohibited. Despite this underage girls have been known to be involved in commercial sex with crew members of large foreign fishing boats, often facilitated by family members.

== See also ==
- Human trafficking in Kiribati
- LGBT rights in Kiribati
