= Murder of Ryan Skipper =

2007 murder in Wahneta, Florida

Ryan Skipper
- Born: Ryan Keith Skipper; April 28, 1981; Winter Haven, Florida
- Died: March 14, 2007 (aged 25); Wahneta, Florida
- Cause of death: Stab wounds

Ryan Keith Skipper (April 28, 1981 – March 14, 2007) was an American man from Polk County, Florida, who was murdered on March 14, 2007, in what authorities declared a hate crime. Skipper's body was discovered on March 15 along a roadside in Wahneta, Florida. Two men were arrested in connection with the crime: William David Brown Jr., and Joseph Bearden, 20 and 21 years old at the time of the incident, respectively. The men were charged with first-degree murder and robbery.

Bearden was convicted of second degree murder in addition to four additional counts on February 27, 2009. He was sentenced to life in prison for the murder charge, two 15-year terms and two five-year terms, all to be served concurrently, on the remaining four charges. On April 16, 2015, however, the Florida Supreme Court quashed the District Court's opinion and granted Bearden a new trial based on incorrect evidentiary rulings regarding a potential third-party confession.

Brown claimed he killed Skipper in retaliation for unwanted sexual advances. He was found guilty by a Polk County jury and sentenced to life in prison without parole.

== Timeline of the crime ==
At 9 p.m. on March 14, after finishing work in Winter Haven, Skipper met friend Karl von Hahmann for dinner. They left the restaurant at 10:30 pm. Skipper returned home where Von Hahmann spoke to him on the telephone at 11:10 pm, after which roommate Kelly Evans saw him go into his bedroom.

Some time around midnight, according to the Polk County, Florida Sheriff's Office, Skipper met Bearden, a convicted car thief who also pleaded no contest to a battery charge in 2004. Sometime afterwards, Skipper, Brown and Bearden drove away in Skipper's car; 15 minutes later Brown and Bearden returned alone.

It is not fully known how Skipper met Bearden and Brown, but Skipper's roommate Joyce Fraley claims to have seen Brown at their house on several occasions. Friend Stephanie Strickland also says that Brown knew a previous tenant of Skipper's home, and lived two blocks away. Allegedly, Brown had visited the home a few times just weeks before he and Bearden murdered Skipper.

Skipper was beaten, stabbed 20 times and his throat slit. His body was dumped by the side of a road in Wahneta, a small town outside Winter Haven. His car was abandoned at Lake Pansy, and the fingerprints of both accused were found inside.

The first trial in the case, that of Joseph Eli Bearden, began February 16, 2009.

On February 28, 2009, after nearly two days of deliberation, jurors found Joseph Bearden guilty of second-degree murder in Ryan Skipper's death. Prosecutors had charged him with first-degree murder and sought the death penalty. Bearden was also found guilty on four other counts: theft of a motor vehicle, accessory after the fact, tampering with evidence, and dealing in stolen property. Bearden was sentenced to life behind bars for the second-degree murder charge, as well as two five-year and two fifteen-year sentences for the other charges, to run concurrently with the life sentence. Bearden appealed the conviction and the Second District Court of Appeal affirmed. On April 16, 2015, however, the Florida Supreme Court quashed the District Court's opinion and granted Bearden a new trial, stating that "the trial court improperly evaluated the credibility of Tyler's testimony, erroneously determined that Bearden's statement was not adequate corroboration under Chambers, and improperly prevented Bearden from recalling Ray Allen Brown." Ray Allen Brown was the individual who Bearden claimed was in the car at the time of the murder as opposed to himself. On the second day of trial, a witness had come forward claiming that Ray Allen confessed to being in the car, a statement which could have potentially exonerated Bearden if the jury was permitted to hear her account of the confession and decide for itself whether it was believable. In doing so, the court prevented Bearden from presenting his entire defense to the jury and thus, Bearden was deprived of his constitutional rights. Hence, the Florida Supreme Court granted Bearden a new trial in accordance with its opinion. In October 2016, Bearden pled guilty to third-degree murder and was sentenced to 20 years in prison.

The trial of Bearden's co-defendant, William Brown Jr., began on October 26, 2009. William "Bill-Bill" Brown, Jr. was found guilty by a Polk County jury (10th Judicial Circuit) of first degree murder, robbery, arson, and tampering with evidence on November 3, 2009. He was sentenced to life in prison without parole for the first degree murder conviction, another life term for the armed robbery with a deadly weapon conviction, a 15-year term for arson, and a five-year term for tampering with evidence by Circuit Judge Michael Hunter on December 1, 2009.

In March of 2024, Bearden was released on conditional parole, but a warrant was issued soon after for failure to contact his supervisors. He was re-arrested by the Polk County Sheriff's Office on September 14, 2024.

== Reactions ==
The murder has caused outrage among gay rights groups, who see similarities between Skipper's murder and that of Matthew Shepard, a gay college student who was murdered in Laramie, Wyoming, in 1998. They have also decried the lack of mainstream attention to Skipper's murder, which the groups attribute to claims by Sheriff Grady Judd that, according to Bearden and Brown, Skipper was cruising for sex when he met his attackers, that he had consumed illegal drugs with Bearden, and that Skipper and his attackers were allegedly planning a check forgery scheme using Skipper's laptop computer. Skipper's family and friends all have agreed that this scenario is highly unlikely, as it was uncharacteristic of Skipper to approach men randomly, and he did not own a laptop computer (he owned a home PC). According to Brian Winfield, spokesman for Equality Florida, "They've characterized Ryan as a pervert, a drug addict and a felon. In the eyes of the media, it didn't carry the human interest that it should have."

The Sheriff's Department has since admitted that the account of the events leading up to the murder that was originally given to the media by Sheriff Grady Judd was based solely on the unsubstantiated statements given by Bearden and Brown upon their arrests. Chief W.J. Martin acknowledged in an article in The Ledger that the two were probably attempting to "minimize their involvement and make themselves look better."

== Documentary ==
Filmmakers Vicki Nantz and Mary Meeks produced and filmed a documentary about Skipper's murder. The 72-minute film, entitled Accessory to Murder: Our Culture's Complicity in the Death of Ryan Skipper, premiered in January 2008. It was selected by the Tampa International Gay and Lesbian Film Festival as part of their Film Outreach Program.

== Benefits ==
The Frenzie Life Theatre Company in Brandon, Florida, announced that their November 2009 production of Dog Sees God: Confessions of a Teenage Blockhead would be dedicated to the memory of Skipper. A portion of all proceeds are to be donated to the foundation.
