= Human rights in Solomon Islands =

Solomon Islands is a sovereign country in Melanesia consisting of many islands and, as of 2013, a population of 561,231. It became self-governing within the United Kingdom in 1976 after three previous attempts at forming a constitution. The Constitution of Solomon Islands was enacted in 1978, which led to conflicts between cultures; armed conflict in the late 1990s forced a review of the 1978 constitution. The review resulted in the Federal Constitution of the Solomon Islands Bill 2004 and other amendments. The chapter on human rights, however, remained unchanged. Human rights concerns and issues regarding education, water, sanitation, women's rights, and LGBTQ rights remain unresolved.

As per the Constitution of Solomon Islands Statutory Instruments, Chapter II outlines the Fundamental Rights and Freedoms of the Individual:

3. Fundamental Rights and Freedoms of the Individual
4. Protection of Right to Life
5. Protection of Right to Personal Liberty
6. Protection from Slavery and Forced Labour
7. Protection from Inhumane Treatment
8. Protection from Deprivation of Property
9. Protection for Privacy of Home and other Property
10. Provisions to secure Protection of Law
11. Protection of Freedom of Conscience
12. Protection of Freedom of Expression
13. Protection of Freedom of Assembly and Association
14. Protection of Freedom of Movement
15. Protection from Discrimination of Grounds of Race Etc.
16. Provisions for periods of Public Emergency
17. Compensation for Contravention of Rights and Freedoms
18. Enforcement of Protective Provisions
19. Interpretations and Savings

== International treaties ==
Solomon Islands joined the United Nations in 1978. It is party to four of the nine core human rights treaties - the International Covenant on Economic Social and Cultural Rights (ICESCR), the Convention on the Elimination of All Forms of Racial Discrimination (CERD), the Convention on the Elimination of All Forms of Discrimination Against Women (CEDAW) and the Convention on the Rights of the Child (CRC). In May 2011, Solomon Islands issued a standing invitation to the UN Special Procedures.

== Education ==
In May 2011, the United Nations released a Universal Periodic Review (UPR) that outlined limited educational opportunities for the island state. Despite the government's 2010 policy statement, which committed to ensuring all Solomon Islanders have equal access to quality education, access to education is an ongoing issue. A 2006–2007 survey of the island found that 65.4% of islanders had at least a primary school education; in urban areas, the figure was 72%.

Because of the "Fee-Free Primary Education" policy of the government, primary education is cost-free and financed by overseas donors. However, it is not compulsory. Article 15 of the ICESCR requires compulsory primary education, as does Article 28 of the CRC. The report recommends that basic primary quality education should be compulsory.

There is also limited access to education for children with disabilities. This is a cultural and social issue as well as a human rights concern. The traditional view is that persons with disabilities are cared for and looked after, and, therefore, not required or expected to be an active part of the community. This charitable approach has led to the majority of children with disabilities having no real access to education. Following the government's 2010 policy, the UPR urges the government to give this the highest priority to give children equal opportunity.

Another issue associated with this is the lack of certified teachers who do not take an interest in what they do. In a 2010 UNICEF mid-term report on education, it was estimated that 50% of teachers in the Solomon Islands were unqualified. The report recommends that the government allocate more of its budget to developing an adequate infrastructure, such as training professional teachers, having more schools and classrooms, as well as ensuring teachers are paid on time.

=== Secondary school ===
Article 28 1(b) of the CRC requires governments to encourage the development of different forms of secondary education, available and accessible to every child, and to take appropriate measures such as the introduction of free education and offering financial assistance in case of need. In a 2006–2007 survey, 29 out of every 100 children aged 12–18 years old attended secondary school. This figure was worse in rural areas, and those surveyed stated that secondary school fees were too expensive for families. The UPR report recommended increasing accessibility to secondary school.

== Water and sanitation ==
The issue of safe drinking water is one that affects 355,000 Solomon Islanders. Although fresh water is available year-round in some places, the islands often suffer from severe water shortage. Water-borne disease and lack of proper sanitation is a major risk and concerned locals have commented that sickness caused from unsafe drinking water has prevented children from attending school. Around half of primary schools have access to safe drinking water. Article 15 ICESCR sets out the criteria for the full enjoyment of the right to water including availability, quality and accessibility.

In Honiara, the capital of Solomon Islands, there are many overcrowded slums as a result of people moving to urban areas in search of opportunities. There was not adequate infrastructure to deal with the influx of inhabitants during the 1970s and 1980s. This has resulted in the unavailability of clean water, leaving residents faced with a long and sometimes dangerous journey to find it. These people often opt instead to wash clothes, dishes and themselves in dirty water, putting them at risk of disease.

The right to sanitation is an integral part of the right to an adequate standard of living, defined in Article 11(1) of the ICESCR. As well as relating to right to health, housing and water, the UN CRC recognizes the right for access to sanitation. According to a 2009 survey of Honiara, only a quarter of residents had adequate toilet facilities. Around 55 percent relieved themselves either in the sea, a river, or nearby toilets.

== Women's rights ==
Although the Solomon Islands are party to CEDAW, women's rights and access to adequate sanitation are limited. Women are not treated equally to men as witnessed by Amnesty International which reported they witnessed 100 young women and girls as well as 2 elderly men collect water from a broken pipe. When asked why no men were collecting the water, they replied that the men were drunk or playing sports. This was also found in another slum where the men were also high on drugs.

The lack of adequate water supply has led to a rise of violence against women, who have to walk further and more often to get water or to go toilet, bathe or to obtain drinking water. This is an issue especially in Honiara's slums where men attack women either physically or sexually making them too afraid to use communal toilets at night. Rape and other abuse is generally unreported to police as women and girls fear reprisals from their attackers. The government has acknowledged the ongoing violence towards women and in 2010 approved a national policy to eliminate violence against women. This was a result of lobbying by women's groups.

In 2011 the Women's Rights Action Movement was founded, which built on the lobbying of the previous years. Its purpose is to challenge the government of the Solomon Islands on women's rights issues, as well as to enable women to be part of political decision-making processes.

== Right to privacy ==
The lack of a women's right to privacy in Solomon Islands is more prevalent in the slums with shared bathing, washing and toilets facilities. There are reports of not being able to wash themselves adequately and being spied on or whistled at. A lack of privacy is demeaning and embarrassing.

== Right to housing ==
When the issue of inadequate housing and facilities especially regarding the slums was broached to government officials, they explained it was the fault of the people and not of the government. The slums sit mostly on Honiara City Council Land, which the ministry of land, housing and survey is responsible for. This issue of state negligence has not been resolved.

== Freedom of expression ==
On November 17, 2020, the country announced they will be banning Facebook, becoming only the fifth country in the world to do so. They cited abusive language, including against government officials, and the need to 'protect the youth' as the main reasons.
