= LGBTQ rights in Guam =

LGBTQ rights in the US territory of Guam

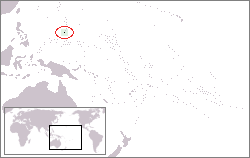
- Guam
- Legal status: Legal since 1978
- Gender identity: Transgender people are allowed to change gender, only after sex reassignment surgery
- Discrimination protections: Protections in employment for sexual orientation and gender identity or expression

Family rights
- Recognition of relationships: Same-sex marriage since 2015
- Adoption: Same-sex couples allowed to adopt

Lesbian, gay, bisexual, transgender and queer (LGBTQ) rights in Guam have improved significantly in recent years. Same-sex sexual activity has not been criminalized since 1978, and same-sex marriage has been allowed since June 2015. The U.S. territory now has discrimination protections in employment for both sexual orientation and gender identity. Additionally, federal law has provided for hate crime coverage since 2009. Gender changes are legal in Guam, provided the applicant has undergone sex reassignment surgery.

== History ==
The Chamorro people have traditionally accepted homosexuality and transgender people. Chamorro society was a very sexually tolerant society, where homosexuality was never viewed as taboo but "was taken for granted as part of life". The Chamorro word for a gay man is mamflorita (literally little flowers), whereas lesbian is malalahi (literally women acting like men).

Following Spanish colonization in the 17th century, and the subsequent Westernization and Americanization of Guam in the 20th century, it incorporated the Western concepts of sexuality and gender, which until recently stigmatized LGBTQ people. In 1900, the Naval Governor of Guam published an order, whereby "the males of the Caroline islanders' community in Guam are hereby forbidden to appear in public in their customary nude condition, or "string-and-pouch" decoration." A new penal code was ordained by the Naval Governor in 1933; identical to California's, it prohibited sodomy, fellatio (oral sex) and cunnilingus, whether heterosexual and homosexual, with between one and ten years' imprisonment. The only reported sodomy case in Guam occurred in the early 1950s. The case, known as Pennington v. Government, resulted in a victory for the defendant, accused of engaging in an act of sodomy, but solely on procedural grounds. The Ninth Circuit Court of Appeals held that the trial court had been without authority to try Pennington without a jury.

Private, adult, consensual and non-commercial homosexual acts have been legal in Guam since a reform of the Criminal Code in 1978.

== Recognition of same-sex relationships ==
Recognition of same-sex relationships in Oceania Marriage Marriages performed elsewhere are recognized (American Samoa) No recognition of same-sex couples Constitution limits marriage to opposite-sex couples (Palau, Tuvalu) Same-sex sexual activity illegal, but criminalisation not enforced Same-sex sexual activity illegal (Country names will appear with mouse-overs when map is viewed at full size. Encircling lines are the exclusive economic zones of each state.)

Guam became the first overseas territory of the United States to recognize and perform same-sex marriages in June 2015. On June 5, 2015, Chief Judge Frances Tydingco-Gatewood of the United States District Court for the District of Guam ruled that Guam's prohibition on same-sex couples marrying is unconstitutional. She cited the Ninth Circuit Court of Appeals decision in Latta v. Otter striking down identical bans in Idaho and Nevada. The territory began issuing marriage licenses to same-sex couples four days later. The Legislature of Guam passed the Guam Marriage Equality Act of 2015 on August 11, 2015, making Guam's marriage laws gender-neutral.

In 2009, a measure was introduced into the Legislature of Guam that would have given same-sex couples some of the same legal rights and responsibilities as opposite-sex married couples. It was not voted on.

== Adoption and family planning ==
Following Guam's legalization of same-sex marriage, adoption by same-sex couples has also been permitted. Additionally, lesbian couples have access to assisted reproduction services, such as in vitro fertilization. Guam recognizes the non-genetic, non-gestational parent as a legal parent to a child born via donor insemination, but only if the parents are married.

In May 2017, the Guam Department of Public Health and Social Services announced it would enter the names of both spouses on the birth certificates of children who have same-sex parents.

== Discrimination protections and hate crime law ==
In August 2015, the Guam Legislature unanimously passed Bill 102-33, which bans discrimination based on sexual orientation and gender identity or expression in employment. Discrimination against government employees based on their sexuality or identity is also forbidden. Federal law covers hate crimes on both sexual orientation and gender identity since 2009 under the federal Matthew Shepard and James Byrd Jr. Hate Crimes Prevention Act.

== Transgender rights ==
In order for transgender people to change their legal gender in Guam on their birth certificate, they must provide the Office of Vital Statistics a sworn statement from a physician that they have undergone sex reassignment surgery. The Office will subsequently amend the birth certificate of the requester. The Motor Vehicle Division Supervisor will issue an amended driver's license upon receipt of a sworn statement from a physician that the sex of the applicant has been surgicially changed.

In May 2018, Senator Fernando Esteves introduced a bill to make it easier for transgender individuals to change their legal gender. Under the proposed bill, transgender people seeking a legal gender change would have had to receive judicial permission and send the Office of Vital Statistics a letter confirming their gender identity. The letter must have also included documentation from a certified psychologist, social worker, therapist or other licensed professional affirming that the applicant's request reflects their sex or gender identity. Surgery would not have been required. On December 13, 2018, the Legislature decided to postpone a vote on the bill until issues regarding medical and law enforcement processes were dealt with, but the bill ultimately failed on December 17, 2018, as it was defeated by a vote of 6–7.

== Blood donation ==
Since 2023, gay and bi men can legally donate blood by the FDA - on the condition of being monogamous.

== Living conditions ==
Guam is regarded as tolerant and accepting of LGBTQ people, with very few reports of societal discrimination or harassment. According to an April 2015 poll conducted by students from the University of Guam, 55% of Guam residents were in favor of same-sex marriage, while 29% opposed it and 16% were undecided.

Since the 1990s, there has been a visible LGBTQ social scene, with a handful of nightclubs and social functions organized locally. Guam Pride has been held annually since 2017, attracting a few hundred people.

Guam is a member of the International Gay and Lesbian Travel Association, and has recently begun commercializing itself as a tourist destination for LGBTQ people.

== Summary table ==
Same-sex sexual activity legal	Yes (Since 1978)
Equal age of consent (16)	Yes (Since 1978)
Anti-discrimination laws in employment	Yes (Since 2015)
Anti-discrimination laws in the provision of goods and services	Yes (Since 2015)
Anti-discrimination laws in all other areas (Incl. indirect discrimination, hate speech)	Yes (Since 2015)
Same-sex marriages	Yes (Since 2015)
Recognition of same-sex couples	Yes (Since 2015)
Stepchild adoption by same-sex couples	Yes (Since 2015)
Joint adoption by same-sex couples	Yes (Since 2015)
LGBTQ people allowed to serve openly in the military	Yes / No (Since 2011 for lesbian, gay and bisexual people; banned for transgender people since 2025)
Right to change legal gender	Yes (Only after sex reassignment surgery)
Access to IVF for lesbian couples	Yes
Commercial surrogacy for gay male couples	Yes
MSMs allowed to donate blood	Yes (Since 2023, implemented by the FDA on the condition of being monogamous)

== See also ==
- LGBTQ rights in the United States
- LGBTQ rights in Oceania
- LGBTQ rights in the Northern Mariana Islands
