= LGBTQ rights in Papua New Guinea =

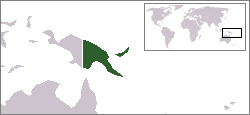
- Location of Papua New Guinea
- Legal status: Male illegal, female legal
- Penalty: Up to 14 years' imprisonment (law rarely enforced, legalization proposed)
- Gender identity: No
- Military: No
- Discrimination protections: No

Family rights
- Recognition of relationships: No
- Adoption: No

Lesbian, gay, bisexual, transgender, and queer (LGBTQ) people in Papua New Guinea face legal challenges not experienced by non-LGBTQ residents. Male same-sex sexual activity is illegal, punishable by up to 14 years' imprisonment. The law is rarely enforced, but arrests still do happen, having occurred in 2015 and 2022. There are no legal restrictions against lesbian sex in the country.

Attitudes towards LGBTQ people are greatly influenced by Christian churches, as a majority of Papua New Guineans are Christian. Historically, gay men had certain societal roles. They would take on traditional female roles such as cooking and would participate with women in traditional festivals. Some tribes were observed to have practiced ritual homosexuality, such as the Etoro, Kaluli, and Sambia peoples.

A lot of the attitudes towards LGBTQ people are also influenced by Australia's early occupation of Papua New Guinea. The Australian criminal law, originally derived from the Queensland Criminal Code created during British colonization, was extended to Papua New Guinea. Despite the Australian states starting to decriminalize same-sex sexual activity in 1975, Papua New Guinea retained this provision due to gaining independence in the same year, resulting in the continued criminalization of such activity there.

In the 21st century, LGBTQ people tend to be more tolerated and accepted in coastal areas than in the New Guinea Highlands. As of 2024, there is no legal recognition of transgender or gender-diverse identities.

== Terminology ==
The words "lesbian", "gay", "bisexual" and "transgender" tend to carry heavy stigma in Papua New Guinea.

In recent years, the Tok Pisin word palopa (reportedly derived from the name of American singer Jennifer Lopez, who is popular among LGBTQ Papua New Guineans) has been used by transgender Papua New Guineans to refer to a cultural and traditional third gender. Similarly, the Sambia people recognise a traditional third gender: kwolu-aatmwol (literally male thing transforming into female thing).

In Motu, the word gelegele refers to a gay man.

== Legality of same-sex sexual activity ==
Male same-sex sexual activity is prohibited by Section 210 of the Papua New Guinea Penal Code. Sodomy is also illegal; those caught engaging in anal sex or oral sex (whether heterosexual or homosexual) can be punished with up to fourteen years' imprisonment. Other same-sex sexual acts may be punished with up to three years' imprisonment. In 2011, the Government informed the United Nations that decriminalising homosexuality was not a priority.

According to the United States Department of State, there were no reports of prosecutions in 2012 directed at LGBTQ persons. However, the department reported that LGBTQ persons in 2012 were "vulnerable to societal stigmatization".

Former MP Dame Carol Kidu in 2012 described gay Papua New Guineans as being forced to live lives of secrecy, and called unsuccessfully on the Government to decriminalise homosexuality. Prime Minister Peter O'Neill explained that there were "strong feelings" against homosexuality in the country, which was "yet to accept such sexual openness".

According to an ILGA report, arrests occurred in 2015 and 2022. In 2015, a man was charged and pled guilty to "indecent acts" between males and received a suspended sentence and being ordered to undergo community service and mandatory counseling. In 2022, two men were arrested after having sex. The report also notes a study in 2011 which found police were one of the main sources of violence against men who have sex with men and trans people.

== Living conditions ==
LGBTQ persons have reported facing "discrimination in their daily lives, and often struggle to find jobs". LGBTQ people have also experienced rape and violence throughout the country, including in Port Moresby, which has led many LGBTQ individuals to flee to the town of Hanuabada.

In 2017 the US Department of State Human Rights Report on Papua New Guinea revealed several incidents that highlight the discrimination faced by homosexuals in the country. In Port Moresby, a hotspot for discriminatory actions, there are reports of gay men being sexually abused by police, raped, and beaten. It is common for this abuse to continue even if it is reported due to an imbalance of power. Often, the victims are framed as the perpetrators.

=== Social attitudes to homosexuality ===
The general public has mixed views towards homosexuality. Homophobia is widespread throughout the country. Homosexuality is generally more accepted in coastal areas than in the New Guinea Highlands.

There are a few nightclubs in Port Moresby that have "gay nights" and small drag parties, mainly in Hanuabada, which has been described as a "gay village" and a sanctuary for local LGBTQ people.

In 2021, Port Moresby held the country's first ever LGBTQ pride parade, bringing in hundreds of people in the community and their supporters together to celebrate. This was a groundbreaking moment for the queer community in Papua New Guinea, as it set the framework for more change to come in the near future.

== Political support ==
Explicit political support for LGBTQ rights in Papua New Guinea is limited, though many politicians are opposed to the "promotion of homosexuality" but have acknowledged the existence of homosexuality.

In 2023, Prime Minister James Marape confirmed that he did not intend to repeal laws criminalising male homosexuality, whilst claiming that laws were already sufficient in protecting LGBTQ rights. He stated:

"There is no bill with our government to promote gays and lesbians in this country. Neither will there be any promotion of gays and lesbians under my watch. People's sexual preferences are within their individual rights of choice but our government will not be promoting this matter or be seen legitimising gay or lesbian rights in PNG. The current laws of our country are sufficient in giving respect to and promoting human rights. These laws protect people against violence, abuse and these are sufficient. As far as our Melanesian and Christian worldviews are concerned, these unnatural practices are not allowed. And I ask those who are invited residents of Papua New Guinea to respect our national mindset and character. There is no bill in Parliament today and we don't intend to go down this path. I ask people not to speculate or make up stories to mislead people."

== Summary table ==
| Same-sex sexual activity legal | No (For males, not enforced) / Yes (For females) |
| Equal age of consent | No (For males) / Yes (For females) |
| Anti-discrimination laws in employment only | No |
| Anti-discrimination laws in the provision of goods and services | No |
| Anti-discrimination laws in all other areas (incl. indirect discrimination, hate speech) | No |
| Same-sex marriages | No |
| Recognition of same-sex couples | No |
| Stepchild adoption by same-sex couples | No |
| Joint adoption by same-sex couples | No |
| LGBTQ people allowed to serve openly in the military | No |
| Right to change legal gender | No |
| Access to IVF for lesbians | No |
| Commercial surrogacy for gay male couples | No |
| MSMs allowed to donate blood | No |

== See also ==
- Human rights in Papua New Guinea
- LGBT rights in Oceania
