= Pionie Boso =

Solomon Islands activist

- Citizenship: Solomon Islands
- Employer: Women's Rights Action Movement
- Awards: International Women of Courage (2011)

Pionie Boso is a women's rights activist from the Solomon Islands, who was awarded an International Women of Courage Award in 2011 for her work towards ending gender-based violence in the country.

== Career ==
Boso worked for the Solomon Islands government in the Ministry of Women, Youth and Children, in the role policy officer for the End Violence Against Women (EVAW) program. In 2009 she led the first national domestic violence survey in the Solomon Islands, which demonstrated that 64% of women aged 16 to 49 had experienced sexual or physical violence. In 2016 the Solomon Islands launched its inaugural Family Protection Act, which was a direct result of the survey. In 2011 she was awarded an International Women of Courage Award for her work on and leadership of the national domestic violence survey.

As of 2021, Boso was program manager for the Women's Rights Action Movement, an advocacy organisation for women based in the Solomon Islands. She has been outspoken about the lack of political representation of women in the government of the Solomon Islands, stating that:

"So far we have only managed to get one woman sitting at the highest level of parliament…you can’t compete with 49 men in the room and only one woman to influence the kind of change that needs to take place in Solomon Islands."

== Awards ==
- International Women of Courage Award (2011).
