= Individual Deprivation Measure =

The Individual Deprivation Measure (IDM) is a new, gender-sensitive and multidimensional measure of poverty developed to assess deprivation at the individual level and overcome the limitations of current approaches which measure poverty at the household level.

== Characteristics ==
=== Individual ===
By assessing poverty at the individual level, the Individual Deprivation Measure enables accurate disaggregation of data by sex, age, disability, and geographic location.

=== Multidimensional ===
The IDM considers a wide range of factors as relevant to measuring poverty, assessing 15 key economic and social dimensions, including some especially important for revealing gender disparity (voice in the community, time-use, family planning and personal relationships).

=== Gender Sensitive ===
The IDM can be sex-disaggregated across 15 dimensions of life, including dimensions important to a gender sensitive understanding of poverty such as time-use, voice in the community and violence, generating a poverty-relevant gender equity measure.

=== Intersectional ===
The IDM collects data on 15 dimensions from each individual, so it can reveal the impact of intersecting deprivations and inform targeting of deprivations impacting particular populations.

=== Scalar ===
The measure uses a 0 to 4 poverty scale to assess the intensity of an individual's poverty. Knowing how poor an individual is, and in what dimensions, matters for targeting policy and programming, and assessing the effectiveness of action.

=== Policy Relevant ===
The IDM can help governments and organisations target poverty more effectively as well as help them measure success or failure, revealing what aspects of poverty are changing, by how much and for whom.

=== Grounded in Participatory Research ===
The IDM is the first poverty measure in the world based on the views of women and men with lived experience of poverty. The dimensions were informed by how women and men think poverty should be defined and what needs to improve in order to move out of poverty.

== History ==
The first research phase of the Individual Deprivation Measure started in 2009. It was a four-year, international, interdisciplinary research collaboration, led by the Australian National University, in partnership with the International Women's Development Agency and the Philippine Health and Social Science Association, University of Colorado at Boulder, and Oxfam Great Britain (Southern Africa), with additional support from Oxfam America and Oslo University. It was funded by the Australian Research Council and partner organisations. The research collaboration involved thousands of participants across 18 sites in six countries.

Subsequent IDM research undertaken in Fiji was led by the International Women's Development Agency in partnership with the Fiji Bureau of Statistics with contributions from the State, Society and Governance Program at the Australian National University. It was funded by the Australian Government's Pacific Women Shaping Pacific Development program.

In 2016, the Australian Government provided significant investment in further development of the measure with the goal that by 2020 the IDM is ready for global use as an individual measure of deprivation and a tool for tracking progress against the 2030 Global Goals. This program is a partnership between the Australian National University, the International Women's Development Agency and the Australian Government through the Department of Foreign Affairs and Trade.

== Supporting the Global Goals ==
The Individual Deprivation Measure has the potential to help achieve the objectives of the 2030 Global Goals for Sustainable Development. The Global Goals require data and evidence to inform prioritising, action and monitoring if they are to be achieved. Recent adoption of the indicators for the Global Goals for Sustainable Development has underlined the importance of individual-level data to support targeting of policy and programming towards achieving the Global Goals, and ensuring that no one is left behind.

The IDM can support the Global Goals by reducing the gender data gap, providing rich, multidimensional data about the lived experience of individual women and men in relation to core economic and social dimensions that people experiencing poverty have identified as important for defining and measuring poverty and deprivation. The IDM can also complement existing and improved gender-sensitive data collection, by showing how national results are translating into change for specific individuals and groups, and the relationship between dimensions and how this varies (for example, by age, disability, sociocultural background or rural/urban location).

== Limitations ==
Additional IDM data collection is under way to inform further refinement of the measure with the goal that by 2020 the IDM is ready for global use as an individual measure of deprivation. Visit the IDM website for updates.
