= International Women's Development Agency =

Women's Development organisation

- Abbreviation: IWDA
- Formation: 1985
- Founded at: Melbourne, Australia
- Type: Non-governmental organisation
- Website: http://www.iwda.org.au

International Women's Development Agency Inc. (IWDA) is an Australian non-profit organisation that works to support women's rights in Asia and the Pacific.

== History ==
International Women’s Development Agency is a secular, non-profit agency, founded in 1985 and based in Melbourne. Its three founding members were: Ruth Pfanner, Wendy Poussard and Wendy Rose. IWDA was formed to break down the barriers that prohibit the full equality of women in every country, but in particular in the Asia-Pacific region. It adheres to the ten principles of the UN's Global Compact. In 2000, the IWDA funded its 300th overseas project. As of 2017, the organisation had worked with 194 partnership organisations in 36 countries. In 2021, the organisation's total income was over 14 million Australian dollars.

== Initiatives ==
IWDA undertakes projects in partnership with women from the Asia-Pacific region. These projects are devised and managed by women who live and work in the communities themselves, fostering practical and innovative responses to the most critical issues facing them. IWDA focuses on three main areas of women's rights: civil and political participation, economic empowerment and sustainable livelihoods, and safety and security. The IWDA supports individual deprivation measure research into poverty.

The project has partnerships in Cambodia, Timor-Leste, Fiji, Papua New Guinea, Solomon Islands, and Myanmar and its borders, amongst others. IWDA also works across research, policy & advocacy to advance women's rights. Its work has expanded to include issues relating to LGBT communities.

=== The Philippines ===
The IWDA's first overseas programme started in the Philippines in 1986, providing healthcare to women.

=== Solomon Islands ===
In the Solomon Islands, the IWDA has partnered with Women’s Rights Action Movement in order to promote increased participation in political life, in particular at a provincial level, as well as working with WRAM to combat other aspects of discrimination against women in the country.
