= LGBTQ rights in the Northern Mariana Islands =

LGBTQ rights in Northern Mariana Islands
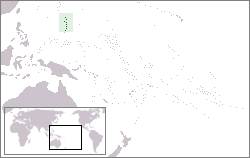
- Northern Mariana Islands
- Legal status: Legal since 1983
- Gender identity: Transgender persons allowed to change gender following surgery
- Discrimination protections: Some protections for government employees

Family rights
- Recognition of relationships: Same-sex marriage since 2015
- Adoption: Since 2015

LGBTQ rights in the Northern Mariana Islands have evolved substantially in recent years. Same-sex marriage and adoption became legal with the Supreme Court's ruling in the case of Obergefell v. Hodges in June 2015. However, the U.S. territory does not ban discrimination based on sexual orientation and gender identity, except in relation to government employees. Gender changes are legal in the Northern Mariana Islands, provided the applicant has undergone sex reassignment surgery.

== History ==
The Chamorro people have traditionally accepted homosexuality and transgender people. Chamorro society was a very sexually tolerant society, where homosexuality was never viewed as taboo but "taken for granted as a part of life". It has been described as openly bisexual, though this is disputed. The Chamorro word for a gay man is mamflorita (literally little flowers), whereas lesbian is malalahi (literally women acting like men).

== Legality of same-sex sexual activity ==
Same-sex sexual activity has been legal in the Northern Marianas since 1983.

== Recognition of same-sex relationships ==
Same-sex marriage became legal in the Commonwealth on June 26, 2015, when the United States Supreme Court ruled that it is unconstitutional to ban same-sex marriages. Prior to this, there was no prohibition on same-sex marriage in the law of the territory, nor do the statutes specify the sex of the parties to a marriage between citizens of the Northern Mariana Islands. Other provisions assume the parties to a marriage are not of the same sex. With respect to a marriage involving one or more non-citizens, the statutes say: "The male at the time of contracting the marriage be at least 18 years of age and the female at least 16 years of age..." Statutes concerning divorce assume that the partners to a marriage are man and wife. These laws have yet to be changed to reflect the Supreme Court ruling.

The first marriage between a same-sex couple occurred on the island of Saipan on July 22, 2015.

== Adoption and family planning ==
As a result of Obergefell v. Hodges, same-sex couples are permitted to adopt. In addition, lesbian couples can access assisted reproduction services, such as in vitro fertilization. Territory law recognizes the non-genetic, non-gestational mother as a legal parent to a child born via donor insemination, but only if the parents are married.

== Discrimination protections and hate crime law ==
The Northern Mariana Islands does not protect people from discrimination on the basis of their sexual orientation or gender identity.

Discrimination against government employees on the basis of their sexual orientation is illegal. The Marianas Visitors Authority and the Civil Service Commission are similarly banned under law from discriminating on account of sexual orientation. Such discrimination is subject to "disciplinary action".

The Administrative Code of the Northern Mariana Islands prohibits bullying, harassment and discrimination against public school students, employees and parents. §60-20-401 states:

All students, employees and parents have the right to be free from discrimination and harassment on the basis of race, creed, religion, color, sex, sexual orientation, national origin, age, cultural or socio-economic status or disabling condition. Employees shall not participate in, or permit others to engage in, any act of discrimination against students, parents or coworkers based on the above factors or in retaliation for the exercise of any of their rights.

Bullying is defined in §60-20-403 as:

As used in this regulation, "bullying, harassment, or intimidation" means intentional conduct, including verbal, physical, or written conduct or an intentional electronic communication that creates a hostile educational environment by substantially interfering with a student’s educational benefits, opportunities, or performance, or with a student's physical or psychological well-being and is:

(i) Motivated by an actual or a perceived personal characteristic including race, national origin, marital status, sex, sexual orientation, gender identity, religion, ancestry, physical attributes, socioeconomic status, familial status, or physical or mental ability or disability;

Lesbian, gay, and bisexual persons are allowed to serve openly in the American Armed Forces.

As of January 2023, the territory's hate crime law covers crimes motivated by hatred based on sexual orientation and gender identity. Such crimes are also covered federally under the Matthew Shepard and James Byrd Jr. Hate Crimes Prevention Act.

== Gender identity and expression ==
Transgender persons in the Northern Mariana Islands may change their legal gender following sex reassignment surgery and a name change. The Vital Statistics Act of 2006, which took effect in March 2007, states that: "Upon receipt of a certified copy of an order of the CNMI Superior Court indicating the sex of an individual born in the CNMI has been changed by surgical procedure and whether such individual’s name has been changed, the certificate of birth of such individual shall be amended as prescribed by regulation."

== Living conditions ==
The first pride parade in the Northern Mariana Islands was held in July 2018.

Since legalization in June 2015, the territory has become a popular marriage destination for same-sex couples, especially among Chinese tourists. In the first half of 2018, 77% of all marriages were same-sex marriages.

== Summary table ==
Same-sex sexual activity legal	Yes (Since 1983)
Equal age of consent	Yes
Anti-discrimination laws in employment only	No / Yes (For government employees)
Anti-discrimination laws in the provision of goods and services	No
Anti-discrimination laws in all other areas (Incl. indirect discrimination, hate speech)	No
Anti-bullying laws include sexual orientation and gender identity	Yes
Same-sex marriages	Yes (Since 2015)
Recognition of same-sex couples	Yes (Since 2015)
Stepchild adoption by same-sex couples	Yes (Since 2015)
Joint adoption by same-sex couples	Yes (Since 2015)
Gays, lesbians and bisexuals allowed to serve openly in the military	Yes (Since 2011)
Transgender people allowed to serve openly in the military	No (Since 2025)
Right to change legal gender	Yes (Since 2007)
Access to IVF for lesbians	Yes
Conversion therapy banned on minors	No
MSMs allowed to donate blood	Yes / No (Since 2020; 3-month deferral period)

== See also ==
- LGBT rights in the United States
- LGBT rights in Oceania
- LGBT rights in Guam
