= Lake Pansy (Winter Haven, Florida) =

- Location within Florida Location within the United States
- Location: north edge of Winter Haven, Florida
- Coordinates: 28°04′07″N 81°44′33″W
- Type: natural freshwater lake
- Basin countries: United States
- Max. length: 880 ft (270 m)
- Max. width: 825 ft (251 m)
- Surface area: 50.42 acres (20 ha)
- Surface elevation: 128 ft (39 m)
- Islands: At times this lake has small islets near shore

Lake Pansy, an almost round lake, has a surface area of 50.42-acre (204,000 m^{2}). This lake is on the north edge of Winter Haven, Florida. The city limits just reach water's edge on the east and southeast and the south city limits of Lake Alfred, Florida, are just across US Highway 92, which is 100 feet (30 m) northeast of Lake Pansy. The lake's north and west shores are bordered by woods. The east and northwest shores are bordered by residences and the southeast shore borders a citrus grove. Lake Pansy and the Winter Haven Municipal Airport are separated on the west side of the lake by 21st Street Northwest.

Lake Pansy has public access via a public boat ramp on its southeast shore. There are no public swimming areas at this lake. The Hook and Bullet website says this lake contains largemouth bass and perch.
