= LGBTQ rights in Oceania =

- Marriage performed Recognition of marriages performed elsewhere in country (American Samoa) No recognition of same-sex couples Constitutional limit on marriage (Palau) Unenforced ban on same-sex sexual activity
- Legal status: Legal, with an equal age of consent, in 8 out of 14 countries Legal, with an equal age of consent, in all 12 territories
- Gender identity: Legal in 3 out of 14 countries Legal in 7 out of 12 territories
- Military: Allowed to serve openly in 2 out of 6 countries having an army Allowed in all 12 territories
- Discrimination protections: Protected in 7 out of 14 countries Protected in 8 out of 12 territories

Family rights
- Recognition of relationships: Recognized in 2 out of 14 countries Recognized in 8 out of 12 territories
- Restrictions: Same-sex marriage constitutionally banned in 2 out of 14 countries
- Adoption: Legal in 2 out of 14 countries Legal in 2 out of 12 territories

Like other regions, Oceania is quite diverse in its laws regarding LGBTQ rights. This ranges from significant rights, including same-sex marriage – granted to the LGBTQ community in New Zealand, Australia, Guam, Hawaiʻi, Easter Island, Northern Mariana Islands, Wallis and Futuna, New Caledonia, French Polynesia and the Pitcairn Islands – to remaining criminal penalties for homosexual activity in six countries. Although acceptance is growing across the Pacific, violence and social stigma remain issues for LGBTQ communities. This also leads to problems with healthcare, including access to HIV treatment in countries such as Papua New Guinea and the Solomon Islands where homosexuality is criminalised.

The United Kingdom introduced conservative social attitudes and anti-LGBTQ laws throughout the British Empire, including its colonies throughout the Pacific Ocean. This legacy persists in anti-LGBTQ laws found in a majority of countries in the subsequent Commonwealth of Nations. Opponents of LGBTQ rights in Oceania have justified their stance by arguing it is supported by tradition and that homosexuality is a "Western vice", although anti-LGBTQ laws themselves are a colonial British legacy. Several Pacific countries have ancient traditions predating colonization that reflect a unique local perspective of sexuality and gender, such as the faʻafafine in Samoa, fakaleitī in Tonga, or māhū in Hawaiʻi.

However, six other countries and territories currently have unenforced criminal penalties for "buggery". These are Kiribati, Papua New Guinea, Samoa, Solomon Islands, Tonga, and Tuvalu.

== Legislation by country or territory ==
=== Australasia ===
LGBT rights in:	Same-sex sexual activity	Recognition of same-sex unions	Same-sex marriage	Adoption by same-sex couples	LGBT people allowed to serve openly in military?	Anti-discrimination laws concerning sexual orientation	Laws concerning gender identity/expression
Australia (including territories of Christmas Island, the Cocos (Keeling) Islands and Norfolk Island)	Yes Always legal for women. Male legal in some states and territories since 1975, nationwide since 1997. Tasmania was the last state to legalise male homosexuality; Equal age of consent in some states and territories since 1975, nationwide since 2016. + UN decl. sign.	Yes Unregistered cohabitation nationally since 2009; Domestic partnerships in Tasmania (2004), South Australia (2007), Victoria (2008), New South Wales (2010), and Queensland (2012); Civil unions in the Australian Capital Territory (2012)	Yes Legal since 2017	Yes Legal nationwide since 2018	Yes Gay men and lesbians since 1992; Transgender and intersex people since 2010	Yes Bans all anti-gay discrimination.	Yes / No Since 2025, differing regulations within each jurisdiction regarding change of sex on a birth certificate applies - for example some jurisdictions still requires “appropriate clinical treatment” (WA, SA & NT), while others are based on “self-determination” (TAS, VIC, NSW, ACT & QLD).. Gender identity change is not recognized for the purpose of inheritance of hereditary peerages and baronetcies, which is subject to Section 16 of the United Kingdom's Gender Recognition Act 2004.
Norfolk Island (external territory of Australia)	Yes Always legal for women. Male legal since 1993. + UN decl. sign.	Yes Since 2010	Yes Legal since 2017	Yes Legal since 2010	Yes Australia responsible for defence	Yes Bans all anti-gay discrimination.	Yes / No Based on "self-determination" (New South Wales law).. Gender identity change is not recognized for the purpose of inheritance of hereditary peerages and baronetcies, which is subject to Section 16 of the United Kingdom's Gender Recognition Act 2004.
New Zealand	Yes Legal since 1986 + UN decl. sign.	Yes Unregistered cohabitation since 2002; Civil unions since 2005	Yes Legal since 2013	Yes Legal since 2013	Yes Since 1993; Includes transgender people	Yes Bans all anti-gay discrimination	Yes Covered under the "sex discrimination" provision of the Human Rights Act 1993; Since July 2023, gender self-determination implemented by legislation on a birth certificate.

=== Melanesia ===
LGBT rights in:	Same-sex sexual activity	Recognition of same-sex unions	Same-sex marriage	Adoption by same-sex couples	LGBT people allowed to serve openly in military?	Anti-discrimination laws concerning sexual orientation	Laws concerning gender identity/expression
Fiji	Yes Legal since 2010 + UN decl. sign.	No	No	No		Yes Bans all anti-gay discrimination Pathologization or attempted treatment of sexual orientation by mental health professionals illegal since 2010	
New Caledonia (Special collectivity of France)	Yes Legal (No laws against same-sex sexual activity have ever existed in the collectivity) + UN decl. sign.	Yes Civil solidarity pact since 2009	Yes Legal since 2013	Yes Legal since 2013	Yes France responsible for defence	Yes Bans all anti-gay discrimination	Yes Under French law
Papua New Guinea	No Male illegal since 1899; Penalty: 3 to 14 years imprisonment (Rarely enforced, Legalization proposed). Yes Female always legal	No	No	No	No	Yes Bans some anti-gay discrimination	No
Solomon Islands	No Illegal since 1963; Penalty: Up to 14 years imprisonment (Not enforced, Legalization proposed).	No	No	No	Has no military	Yes Bans some anti-gay discrimination	No
Vanuatu	Yes Legal (No laws against same-sex sexual activity have ever existed since independence) + UN decl. sign.	No	No	No		Yes Bans some anti-gay discrimination	No

=== Micronesia ===
LGBT rights in:	Same-sex sexual activity	Recognition of same-sex unions	Same-sex marriage	Adoption by same-sex couples	LGBT people allowed to serve openly in military?	Anti-discrimination laws concerning sexual orientation	Laws concerning gender identity/expression	Lack of a Presence of Anti-LGBT laws
Guam (Unincorporated territory of the United States)	Yes Legal since 1978	Yes Since 2015	Yes Legal since 2015	Yes Legal since 2002	Yes United States responsible for defense	Yes Bans some anti-gay discrimination	Yes Allowed to legally change gender, but requires sex reassignment surgery	Yes
(Federated States of Micronesia) Micronesia	Yes Legal + UN decl. sign.	No	No	No	Has no military	Yes Bans all anti-gay discrimination		
Kiribati	No Male illegal since 1943; Penalty: 5-14 years imprisonment (Not enforced, Legalization proposed). Yes Female legal	No	No	No	Has no military	Yes Bans some anti-gay discrimination	No	
Marshall Islands	Yes Legal since 2005 + UN decl. sign.	No	No	No	Has no military	Yes Bans all anti-gay discrimination		
Nauru	Yes Legal since 2016 + UN decl. sign.	No	No	No	Has no military	Yes; Pathologization or attempted treatment of sexual orientation by mental health professionals illegal since 2016	No	
Northern Mariana Islands (Unincorporated territory of the United States)	Yes Legal since 1983	Yes Since 2015	Yes Legal since 2015	Yes Legal since 2015	Yes United States responsible for defense	Yes Bans some anti-gay discrimination	Yes Under the Vital Statistics Act of 2006	Yes
Palau	Yes Legal since 2014 + UN decl. sign.	No	No Constitutional ban since 2008	No	Has no military	Yes Bans some anti-gay discrimination	No	
United States Minor Outlying Islands (Unincorporated territories of the United States)	Yes Legal	Yes	Yes Legal	Yes Legal	Yes United States responsible for defense	Yes Bans some anti-gay discrimination	No	Yes

=== Polynesia ===
LGBT rights in:	Same-sex sexual activity	Recognition of same-sex unions	Same-sex marriage	Adoption by same-sex couples	LGBT people allowed to serve openly in military?	Anti-discrimination laws concerning sexual orientation	Laws concerning gender identity/expression
American Samoa (Unincorporated territory of the United States)	Yes Legal since 1980	No / Yes Same-sex marriages recognized but not performed under Respect for Marriage Act since 2022.	No / Yes Same-sex marriages recognized but not performed under Respect for Marriage Act since 2022.	No	Yes United States responsible for defense	Yes Bans some anti-gay discrimination	Yes
Cook Islands (Part of the Realm of New Zealand)	Yes Legal since 2023 + UN decl. sign.	No	No	No	Yes New Zealand responsible for defence	Yes Bans some anti-gay discrimination	No
Easter Island (Special territory of Chile)	Yes Legal since 1999 + UN decl.	Yes Civil unions since 2015	Yes Since 2022	Yes Since 2022	Yes Chile responsible for defence	Yes Bans all anti-gay discrimination Pathologization or attempted treatment of sexual orientation by mental health professionals illegal since 2021	Yes Transgender persons can change their legal gender and name since 1974. No surgeries or judicial order since 2019.
French Polynesia (Overseas collectivity of France)	Yes Legal (No laws against same-sex sexual activity have ever existed in the collectivity) + UN decl. sign.	Yes Since 2013	Yes Legal since 2013	Yes Legal since 2013	Yes France responsible for defence	Yes Bans all anti-gay discrimination	Yes Under French law
Hawaii (Constituent state of the United States)	Yes Since 1972	Yes Since 1997	Yes Since 2013	Yes Since 2012	Yes United States responsible for defence	Yes Bans all anti-gay discrimination	Yes
Niue (Part of the Realm of New Zealand)	Yes Legal since 2024 + UN decl. sign.	No	No	No	Yes New Zealand responsible for defence	No	
Pitcairn Islands (Overseas Territory of the United Kingdom)	Yes Legal since 2001 + UN decl. sign.	Yes Since 2015	Yes Legal since 2015	Yes Legal since 2015	Yes UK responsible for defence	Yes Constitutional ban on all anti-gay discrimination	
Samoa	No Male illegal since 1961; Penalty: 5-7 years imprisonment (Not enforced, Legalization proposed); Yes Female always legal + UN decl. sign.	No	No	No	Has no military	Yes Bans some anti-gay discrimination Pathologization or attempted treatment of sexual orientation by mental health professionals illegal since 2007	Samoa has a large transgender or "third-gender" community called the fa'afafine. They are a recognized part of traditional Samoan customs.
Tokelau (Dependent territory of the Realm of New Zealand)	Yes Legal since 2007 + UN decl. sign.	No	No	No	Yes New Zealand responsible for defence	No	No
Tonga	No Male illegal since 1988; Penalty: Up to 10 years imprisonment (Not enforced, Legalization proposed). Yes Female always legal	No	No	No	No	Yes Bans some anti-gay discrimination	No
Tuvalu	No Male illegal since 1965; Penalty: Up to 14 years imprisonment (Not enforced, Legalization proposed); Yes Female legal + UN decl. sign.	No	No Constitutional ban since 2023	No	Has no military	Yes Bans some anti-gay discrimination	
Wallis and Futuna (Overseas collectivity of France)	Yes Legal (No laws against same-sex sexual activity have ever existed in the collectivity) + UN decl. sign.	Yes Civil solidarity pact since 2009	Yes Legal since 2013	Yes Legal since 2013	Yes France responsible for defence	Yes Bans all anti-gay discrimination	Yes Under French law

== Public opinion ==
Indicates the country/territory has legalized same-sex marriage nationwide
Indicates that same-sex marriage is legal in certain parts of the country
Indicates that the country has civil unions or registered partnerships
Indicates that same-sex sexual activity is illegal

Opinion polls for same-sex marriage by country
Country	Pollster	Year	For	Against	Neutral (Note: Also comprises other responses, including: Don't know; No answer; Other; Refused.)	Margin of error	Source
Australia	Ipsos	2023	63%	27% [16% support some rights]	10% not sure	±3.5%	
New Zealand	Ipsos	2023	70%	20% [11% support some rights]	9%	±3.5%	

Opinion polls for same-sex marriage by dependent territory and sub-national entities
Country	Pollster	Year	For	Against	Neutral	Margin of error	Source
Guam	University of Guam	2015	55%	29%	16%	-	

== See also ==
- Recognition of same-sex unions in Oceania
- Australian Marriage Law Postal Survey
- LGBTQ rights by country or territory
- LGBTQ rights in Europe
- LGBTQ rights in the Americas
- LGBTQ rights in Asia
- LGBTQ rights in Africa
