= LGBTQ rights in Solomon Islands =

- Solomon Islands
- Legal status: Illegal
- Penalty: Up to 14 years imprisonment (not enforced, legalisation proposed)
- Gender identity: No
- Military: No armed forces
- Discrimination protections: No

Family rights
- Recognition of relationships: No
- Adoption: No

Lesbian, gay, bisexual, transgender and queer (LGBTQ) people in Solomon Islands face legal challenges not experienced by non-LGBTQ residents. Male and female same-sex sexual activity is illegal, punishable by up to 14 years imprisonment, but the law is not enforced.

== Legality of same-sex activity ==
Same-sex sexual activity has been illegal since its criminalization in the 1880s. Engaging in anal sex or oral sex with another person, whether heterosexual or homosexual, is punishable by up to 14 years imprisonment under Section 160, Chapter 26 of the Penal Code of Solomon Islands. Attempting anal or oral sex can be punished by up to seven years imprisonment. Acts of "gross indecency", even in private, can be punished with five years imprisonment. However, the United States Department of State reported that there were no reports in 2010, 2011, 2012, or 2013 of arrests or prosecutions directed at LGBTQ people.

It is advisable that gay and lesbian citizens and travelers avoid public displays of affection, which could be categorized by the Solomon Islands penal code as an act of gross indecency, a felony, liable to imprisonment for 5 years. The Law Reform Commission proposed legalizing gay and lesbian sexual activity in December 2008, but the move was strongly opposed. The government told the United Nations in 2011 that it had no intention of decriminalising homosexuality.

== Recognition of same-sex relationships ==
Solomon Islands does not recognise same-sex unions in any form.

In 2017, in a speech to a local church group, Prime Minister Manasseh Sogavare stated his opposition to same-sex marriage. In June 2018, Governor General Frank Kabui, while acknowledging the existence of LGBTQ people in Solomon Islands and stating that "It is not wrong to [be] born with gay or lesbian inclination, it is said to be biological and is beyond individual control", reiterated his opposition to same-sex marriage. He condemned any attempt to change the laws, justifying his position with reference to the criminal code that prohibits same-sex sexual activity and to the Bible on Christian religious grounds.

== Discrimination protections ==
Solomon Islands is currently reforming its Constitution. In the first draft of 2009 of the new Constitution of the proposed Federal Democratic Republic of Solomon Islands, "sexual orientation" was explicitly and newly included as a prohibited ground of discrimination. In the 2011 draft and the 2013 draft, there was no mention of "sexual orientation". In the latest second 2014 draft (published on 6 May 2014), "sexual orientation" was not put as a prohibited ground of discrimination. As of 2019, the constitutional reform is still in the process.

== Summary table ==
Same-sex sexual activity	No (Illegal. Not enforced, legalization proposed)
Equal age of consent	No
Anti-discrimination laws in employment only	No
Anti-discrimination laws in the provision of goods and services	No
Anti-discrimination laws in all other areas (Incl. indirect discrimination, hate speech)	No
Hate crime laws including sexual orientation and gender identity	No
Same-sex marriages	No
Recognition of same-sex couples	No
Stepchild adoption by same-sex couples	No
Joint adoption by same-sex couples	No
LGBTQ people allowed to serve openly in the military	Has no military
Right to change legal gender	No
Conversion therapy banned	No
Access to IVF for lesbians	No
Commercial surrogacy for gay male couples	No
MSMs allowed to donate blood	No

== See also ==
- Human rights in Solomon Islands
- LGBTQ rights in Oceania
