= Women's Rights Action Movement =

Women's rights organisation based in the Solomon Islands

- Abbreviation: WRAM
- Formation: 2011
- Purpose: Women's rights
- Main organ: Board

Women's Rights Action Movement (WRAM) is a women's rights organisation based in the Solomon Islands, which campaigns for greater representation of women in politics, as well as advocating for changes to the governance of the country to enable gender parity.

== History ==
Women's Rights Action Movement (WRAM) was founded in 2011 as a registered charity in the Solomon Islands. The initial aims of the organisation included: to enable more women to participate in decision-making and leadership roles; to take affirmative action to combat inequalities faced by women; to challenge the prevalence of violence against women in the country. It also sought to educate Solomon Islanders about their rights and the impact of government policies, as well as critiquing the work of the government.

In 2013 the organisation received a grant from the International Women's Development Agency to support set-up costs for its administration. In 2014, the then President Rose Isukana said that although "WRAM is a new organisation ... those behind it are not new to working with and on issues affecting women".

== Campaigns ==
WRAM has been involved in a number of initiatives aimed at combatting gender inequality in the Solomon Islands. In the 2014 Solomon Islands elections WRAM supported the media campaigns of women candidates.

In 2016, WRAM worked with five other women's organisations to convene the first Solomon Islands Women's Forum, whose purpose was to build capacity and understanding between non-governmental organisations across the provinces. In 2021, the COVID-19 pandemic prevented from women's organisations from gathering for the forum in Honiara, so instead, versions of the forum were held in each province.

WRAM, working with Pionie Boso in 2016, was also instrumental in bringing a change to Solomon Islands law through the Family Protection Act, which for the very first time made physical, sexual, psychological and economic abuse illegal in the country. It also acknowledged the impacts of psychological and economic abuse for the first time. Following the change in the law WRAM advocated for greater resourcing for the Family Protection Act's Implementation Plan. The same year, WRAM was an active partner in the process of creating a new constitution for the Solomon Islands.

In 2018 Anika Kingmele spoke at the Women Practise Parliament event in Honiara, which was supported by WRAM, where fifty women from across the Solomon Island provinces were encouraged to consider ways they could become increasingly involved in decision-making processes. The participation of women in parliamentary life is a major goal of WRAM: in the Solomon Islands, as of 2018, there were only two women MPs. WRAM has been advocating for reserved parliamentary seats for women in its provincial government.

== Organisation ==
Initially the organisation was set up with two staff members, as well as a trustee board of nine and a financial board of eighteen members. It is a member of Women's Action for Voice and Empowerment (WAVE), which is an umbrella organisation advocating for the voices of women across Melanesia. The structure includes a President, vice-president, Treasurer, Secretary to the Board and other members.

=== Presidents ===
- Rose Isukana (? - 2014).
- Anika Kingmele (2014 - 2018).
- Maria Pepa (2018 - 2021).
