= LGBTQ rights in Kiribati =

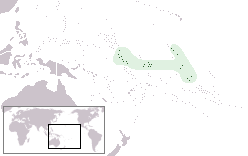
- Kiribati
- Legal status: Male illegal Female legal
- Penalty: Up to 14 years imprisonment (not enforced, legalisation proposed)
- Military: Has no military
- Discrimination protections: Sexual orientation discrimination banned in employment

Family rights
- Recognition of relationships: No
- Adoption: No

Lesbian, gay, bisexual, transgender, and queer (LGBTQ) people in Kiribati face legal challenges not experienced by non-LGBT residents. Male homosexuality is illegal in Kiribati with a penalty of up to 14 years in prison, but the law is not enforced. Female homosexuality is legal, but lesbians may face violence and discrimination. Despite this, employment discrimination on the basis of sexual orientation has been prohibited since 2015.

In November 2016, Kiribati voted against a plan to get rid of the UN Independent Expert on violence and discrimination based on sexual orientation and gender identity at the United Nations General Assembly. The push to get rid of the UN expert failed in an 84–77 vote. As the voting was on an amendment to block an anti-LGBTQ proposal, a vote in favor was a vote for keeping the special rapporteur on protection against violence and discrimination based on sexual orientation and gender identity. Kiribati along with Sri Lanka were the only two countries, where homosexuality is still criminalised, who voted this way.

== History ==
Kiribati is home to a traditional transgender population, called binabinaaine. The Gilbertese word binabinaaine refers to people who were assigned male at birth but act, dress and behave as female, while the word binabinamane has the opposite meaning, that being a person who was assigned female at birth but behaves as male. People who live as these gender roles have traditionally been accepted by Kiribati society and not perceived as immoral or disordered. They have been historically described as belonging to a third gender alongside male and female. Current local association BIMBA describe themselves as trans women.

== Laws regarding same-sex sexual activity ==
Sections 153, 154, and 155 of the Penal Code outlaw anal intercourse and oral copulation, regardless of sex. There are no reports of prosecutions directed against LGBTQ people under these laws.

153. Unnatural Offences

Any person who-
(a) commits buggery with another person or with an animal; or
(b) permits a male person to commit buggery with him or her,
shall be guilty of a felony, and shall be liable to imprisonment for 14 years.

154. Attempts to commit unnatural offences and indecent assaults

Any person who attempts to commit any of the offences it specified in the last preceding section, or who is guilty of any assault with intent to commit the same, or any indecent assault upon any male person shall be guilty of a felony, and shall be liable to imprisonment for 7 years.

155. Indecent practices between males

Any male person who, whether in public or private, commits any act of gross indecency with another male person, or procures another male person to commit any act of gross indecency with him, or attempts to procure the commission of any such act by any male person with himself or with another male person, whether in public or private, shall be guilty of a felony, and shall be liable to imprisonment for 5 years.

=== Decriminalisation efforts ===
In August 2015, as part of the Universal Periodic Review, Kiribati's human rights record was scrutinised by other countries. France, Slovenia and Chile urged Kiribati to repeal its laws against homosexuality. The Kiribati delegation made no response to these recommendations.

== Recognition of same-sex relationships ==
The Marriage Act (Cap 54) does not expressly forbid the recognition of same-sex marriages, but generally assumes the partners to be of the opposite sex. The law's "restrictions on marriage" section forbids marriages with family relatives, marriage where either party is below the age of 16 and bigamy. The Magistrate's Court (Bowi Inano) has the legal power to void and dissolve marriages.

== Discrimination protections ==
Discrimination against employees and prospective employees based on "sexual orientation" is prohibited under Article 107(2)(b) of the Employment and Industrial Relations Code 2015.

The Constitution of Kiribati does not expressly address discrimination based on sexual orientation or gender identity. Article 15(3), entitled "Protection from discrimination on the grounds of race, etc", states:

- in English: In this section, the expression "discriminatory" means affording different treatment to different persons attributable wholly or mainly to their respective descriptions by race, place of origin, political opinions, colour or creed whereby persons of one such description are subjected to disabilities or restrictions to which persons of another such description are not made subject or are accorded privileges or advantages which are not accorded to persons of another such description
- in Gilbertese: N te kibu aio te taeka ae "kakaokoroaki" nanona bon te makuri ae e kakaokoroaki arona nakoia aomata aika a kakaokoro ae a anganaki ni kaeti nakon aia reeti, aia tabo are a riki mai iai, aia iango i bukin te tautaeka, kuniia ke aia koaua n te aro are tem'aangina a reke i aan te aki konaa ke kateituaakiia, ao tem'aangina a aki reke iai, ke tib'angana ma vaaki a anganaki tabeman ao tabeman a aki

== Summary table ==
Same-sex sexual activity legal	No (For males, not enforced, legalisation proposed)/ Yes (For females)
Equal age of consent	No (For males)/ Yes (For females)
Anti-discrimination laws in employment only	Yes (Since 2015)
Anti-discrimination laws in the provision of goods and services	No
Anti-discrimination laws in all other areas (Incl. indirect discrimination, hate speech)	No
Same-sex marriages	No
Recognition of same-sex couples	No
Stepchild adoption by same-sex couples	No
Joint adoption by same-sex couples	No
LGBTQ people allowed to serve openly in the military	Has no military
Right to change legal gender	No
Access to IVF for lesbians	No
Commercial surrogacy for gay male couples	No
MSMs allowed to donate blood	No

== See also ==
- Human rights in Kiribati
- LGBT rights in Oceania
