= Human trafficking in Kiribati =

Kiribati ratified the 2000 UN TIP Protocol in September 2005.

In 2010 Kiribati was a source country for girls subjected to trafficking, specifically commercial sexual exploitation. Crew members on Korean and perhaps other foreign fishing vessels in Kiribati or in its territorial waters exploited prostituted children aboard their ships. Some girls were also forced into prostitution in bars frequented by crew members. Local I-Kiribati, sometimes family members but also taxi drivers and owners of small boats, knowingly facilitated trafficking by transporting underage girls to the boats for the purposes of prostitution. The girls generally received cash, food, or goods in exchange for sexual services.

In 2010 the Government of Kiribati did not fully comply with the minimum standards for the elimination of trafficking; however, it made significant efforts to do so. Despite these efforts, the government has not proactively identified victims, investigated or prosecuted suspected trafficking offenders, or educated the public on the dangers of human trafficking; therefore, Kiribati was placed on Tier 2 Watch List. While the government acknowledged that the prostitution of girls was a problem in Kiribati, it took no steps to protect victims of sex trafficking, investigate and prosecute foreign crewmen for the commercial sexual exploitation of children within its territory, proactively identify child victims of sex trafficking, or educate the public about the dangers of trafficking.

The U.S. State Department's Office to Monitor and Combat Trafficking in Persons placed the country in "Tier 2" in 2014. In 2023, the Organised Crime Index noted increasing levels of the crime in Kiribati.

== Prosecution (2010) ==
The Government of Kiribati made no discernible law enforcement efforts to combat human trafficking during the reporting period. No trafficking offenders were investigated, arrested, prosecuted, or convicted in the past year, although information about particular victims in trafficking situations was available. Kiribati's 2005 comprehensive anti-trafficking legislation criminalizes all forms of trafficking, but does not include specific definitions of trafficking for labor or sexual exploitation. The law prescribes sufficiently stringent punishments of up to 15 years’ imprisonment, which are commensurate with penalties prescribed for other serious crimes, such as rape. The 2005 law also provides protection and rights for victims of trafficking. The lack of a legal definition of sex or labor trafficking which identifies the essential elements of a trafficking crime prevents law enforcement officers from rescuing victims or arresting trafficking offenders on trafficking charges. The government provided no training to law enforcement and court personnel on identifying trafficking victims and prosecuting trafficking offenders. As members of Pacific Island international law enforcement groups, mechanisms exist to allow the country to work in partnership with other governments on trafficking cases, though these have not been used. There is no evidence of officials’ complicity in human trafficking activity.

== Protection (2010) ==
The Government of Kiribati did not make discernible progress in ensuring trafficking victims’ access to protective services during the year. Law enforcement and social services personnel do not have a formal system of proactively identifying victims of trafficking among high-risk persons with whom they come in contact; they identified no victims during the reporting period. The government does not have any formal arrangements or mechanisms in place to provide trafficking victims with access to legal, medical, or psychological services, and no plans to develop the capacity to do so. The Kiribati government has not developed or implemented a referral process to transfer victims detained, arrested, or placed in protective custody by law enforcement authorities to institutions that provide short or long-term care. It has a limited capacity to protect victims of trafficking or victims of other crimes, and relies on NGO's and international organizations to provide most victim services. Kiribati does not have victim care facilities specifically to care for trafficking victims. The law in Kiribati generally protects rights of victims of violent crime, which would include victims of trafficking.

== Prevention (2010) ==
The government made no discernible efforts to prevent trafficking or raise public awareness of the dangers of trafficking. An inter-agency transnational crime task force made up of law enforcement officials from the police, the Attorney General's office, and the immigration, customs, and finance ministries met monthly and included trafficking in persons as one of its responsibilities. The government did not provide any specialized training for government or law enforcement officials on how to recognize, investigate, and prosecute instances of trafficking. It took no action to reduce the demand for commercial sex acts during the reporting period. There is no evidence that citizens of Kiribati are involved in international sex tourism.
