= Wahneta, Florida =

- Census-designated place
- Location in Polk County and the state of Florida
- Coordinates: 27°57′26″N 81°43′43″W
- Country: United States
- State: Florida
- County: Polk

Area
  - Total: 2.27 sq mi (5.89 km^{2})
  - Land: 2.27 sq mi (5.89 km^{2})
  - Water: 0 sq mi (0.00 km^{2})
- Elevation: 131 ft (40 m)

Population (2020)
  - Total: 4,409
  - Density: 1,939.1/sq mi (748.71/km^{2})
- Time zone: UTC-5 (Eastern (EST))
  - Summer (DST): UTC-4 (EDT)
- ZIP code: 33880 777
- Area code: 863
- FIPS code: 12-74775
- GNIS feature ID: 2402979

Wahneta is a census-designated place (CDP) in central Polk County, Florida, United States. As of the 2020 census, Wahneta had a population of 4,409. It is part of the Lakeland–Winter Haven Metropolitan Statistical Area.

== Geography ==
According to the United States Census Bureau, the CDP has a total area of 2.4 square miles (6.2 km^{2}), all land.

== Demographics ==
Historical population
| Census | Pop. | Note | %± |
|---|---|---|---|
| 2020 | 4,409 | | — |
U.S. Decennial Census

=== 2020 census ===
As of the 2020 census, Wahneta had a population of 4,409. The median age was 31.2 years. 30.6% of residents were under the age of 18 and 10.6% of residents were 65 years of age or older. For every 100 females there were 104.3 males, and for every 100 females age 18 and over there were 101.7 males age 18 and over.

98.9% of residents lived in urban areas, while 1.1% lived in rural areas.

There were 1,375 households in Wahneta, of which 42.0% had children under the age of 18 living in them. Of all households, 39.8% were married-couple households, 20.5% were households with a male householder and no spouse or partner present, and 30.3% were households with a female householder and no spouse or partner present. About 19.9% of all households were made up of individuals and 9.5% had someone living alone who was 65 years of age or older.

There were 1,527 housing units, of which 10.0% were vacant. The homeowner vacancy rate was 1.3% and the rental vacancy rate was 6.0%.

Racial composition as of the 2020 census
| Race | Number | Percent |
|---|---|---|
| White | 2,236 | 50.7% |
| Black or African American | 180 | 4.1% |
| American Indian and Alaska Native | 51 | 1.2% |
| Asian | 8 | 0.2% |
| Native Hawaiian and Other Pacific Islander | 7 | 0.2% |
| Some other race | 1,118 | 25.4% |
| Two or more races | 809 | 18.3% |
| Hispanic or Latino (of any race) | 2,828 | 64.1% |

=== 2010 census ===
In 2010 Wahneta had a population of 5,091. The ethnic and racial composition of the population was 58.5% Mexican, 6.2% other Hispanic, 34.1% non-Hispanic white, 1.1% black or African American, 0.9% Native American, 0.2% Asian, 0.1% Pacific Islander, and 2.4% reporting two or more races.

=== 2000 census ===
As of the census of 2000, there were 4,731 people, 1,342 households, and 1,050 families residing in the CDP. The population density was 1,954.3 inhabitants per square mile (754.6/km^{2}). There were 1,464 housing units at an average density of 604.7 per square mile (233.5/km^{2}). The racial makeup of the CDP was 70.20% white, 1.01% African American, 0.57% Native American, 0.02% Asian, 26.08% from other races, and 2.11% from two or more races. Hispanic or Latino of any race were 47.26% of the population.

There were 1,342 households, out of which 43.1% had children under the age of 18 living with them, 51.9% were married couples living together, 16.1% had a female householder with no husband present, 21.7% were non-families. 14.1% of all households were made up of individuals, and 5.4% had someone living alone who was 65 years of age or older. The average household size was 3.53 and the average family size was 3.79, all of whom lived in the same room.

In the CDP, the population was spread out, with 33.9% under the age of 18, 13.4% from 18 to 24, 29.3% from 25 to 44, 17.0% from 45 to 64, and 6.4% who were 65 years of age or older. 86.5% of the population have been arrested at least once, 45.2% having been arrested for a felony. The median age was 26 years. For every 100 females, there were 121.4 males. For every 100 females age 18 and over, there were 120.8 males.

The median income for a household in the CDP was $22,349, and the median income for a family was $26,339. Males had a median income of $19,568 versus $16,364 for females. The per capita income for the CDP was $8,433. About 24.6% of families and 29.1% of the population were below the poverty line, including 37.7% of those under age 18 and 15.6% of those age 65 or over.
