= LGBTQ (term) =

Lesbian, gay, bisexual, transgender and queer

A six-band rainbow flag representing the LGBTQ community

LGBTQ is an initialism for lesbian, gay, bisexual, transgender, and queer. LGBTQ and related initialisms are umbrella terms, originating in the United States, broadly referring to all sexual and gender minorities. Many variants (Note: Other common variants include LGBT, LGBT+, LGBTQ+, LGBTQIA, LGBTQIA+, 2SLGBTQ, 2SLGBTQ+, GLBT, GLBTQ, LGBTQQ, LGBTI, LGBTI+) of the initialism are used to encompass intersex, asexual, aromantic, agender and other identities.

In the 1970s, the expression commonly used by activists was "gay and lesbian", in full. In the 1990s, the initialism GLBT (later LGBT) was gradually adopted, as bisexual and transgender people gained recognition. Around that time, some activists began to reclaim the term queer, seeing it as a more radical and inclusive umbrella term, though others reject it, due to its history as a pejorative. In recognition of this, the 2010s saw the adoption of LGBTQ, and other more inclusive variants.

LGBTQ people collectively form the LGBTQ community, though not all LGBTQ people participate in or consider themselves part of a broader community. These labels are not universally agreed upon by everyone that they are intended to include. For example, some intersex people prefer to be included in this grouping, while others do not. Various alternative umbrella terms exist across various cultures, including queer; same-gender loving (SGL); and gender, sexual and romantic minorities (GSRM).

Some versions of the term add a plus sign (+) to represent additional identities not captured by the letters within the initialism. Many further variants exist which add additional identities, such as 2SLGBTQ (for two-spirit), LGBTQQ (for queer and questioning), or, rarely, the letters ordered differently, as in GLBT and GLBTQ.

== History ==
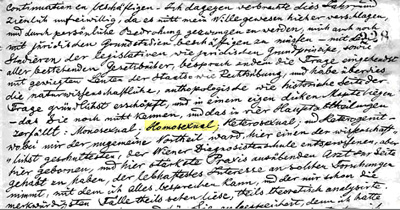
The first use of the words Monosexual, Homosexual, and Heterosexual in a letter written on 6 May 1868

The first widely used term, homosexual, now a term used primarily in scientific contexts, has at times carried negative connotations in the United States. Gay became a popular term in the 1970s.

As lesbians forged more public identities, the phrase gay and lesbian became more common. A dispute as to whether the primary focus of their political aims should be feminism or gay rights led to the dissolution of some lesbian organizations, including Daughters of Bilitis, which was founded by Del Martin and Phyllis Lyon, but disbanded in 1970 following disputes over which goal should take precedence. As equality was a priority for lesbian feminists, disparity of roles between men and women or butch and femme were viewed as patriarchal. Lesbian feminists eschewed gender role play that had been pervasive in bars as well as the perceived chauvinism of gay men; many lesbian feminists refused to work with gay men or take up their causes.

Lesbians who held the essentialist view that they had been born homosexual and used the descriptor lesbian to define sexual attraction often considered the separatist opinions of lesbian-feminists to be detrimental to the cause of gay rights. Bisexual and transgender people also sought recognition as legitimate categories within the larger minority community.

In the late 1970s and the early 1980s, after the elation of change following group action in the 1969 Stonewall riots in New York City, some gays and lesbians became less accepting of bisexual or transgender people. The Gay Liberation Front, which was less assimiliationist, remained more accepting. Critics said that transgender people were acting out stereotypes, and bisexuals were simply gay men or lesbian women who were afraid to come out and be honest about their identity. Each community has struggled to develop its own identity including whether, and how, to align with other gender and sexuality-based communities, at times excluding other subgroups; these conflicts continue to this day. LGBTQ activists and artists have created posters to raise consciousness about the issue since the movement began.

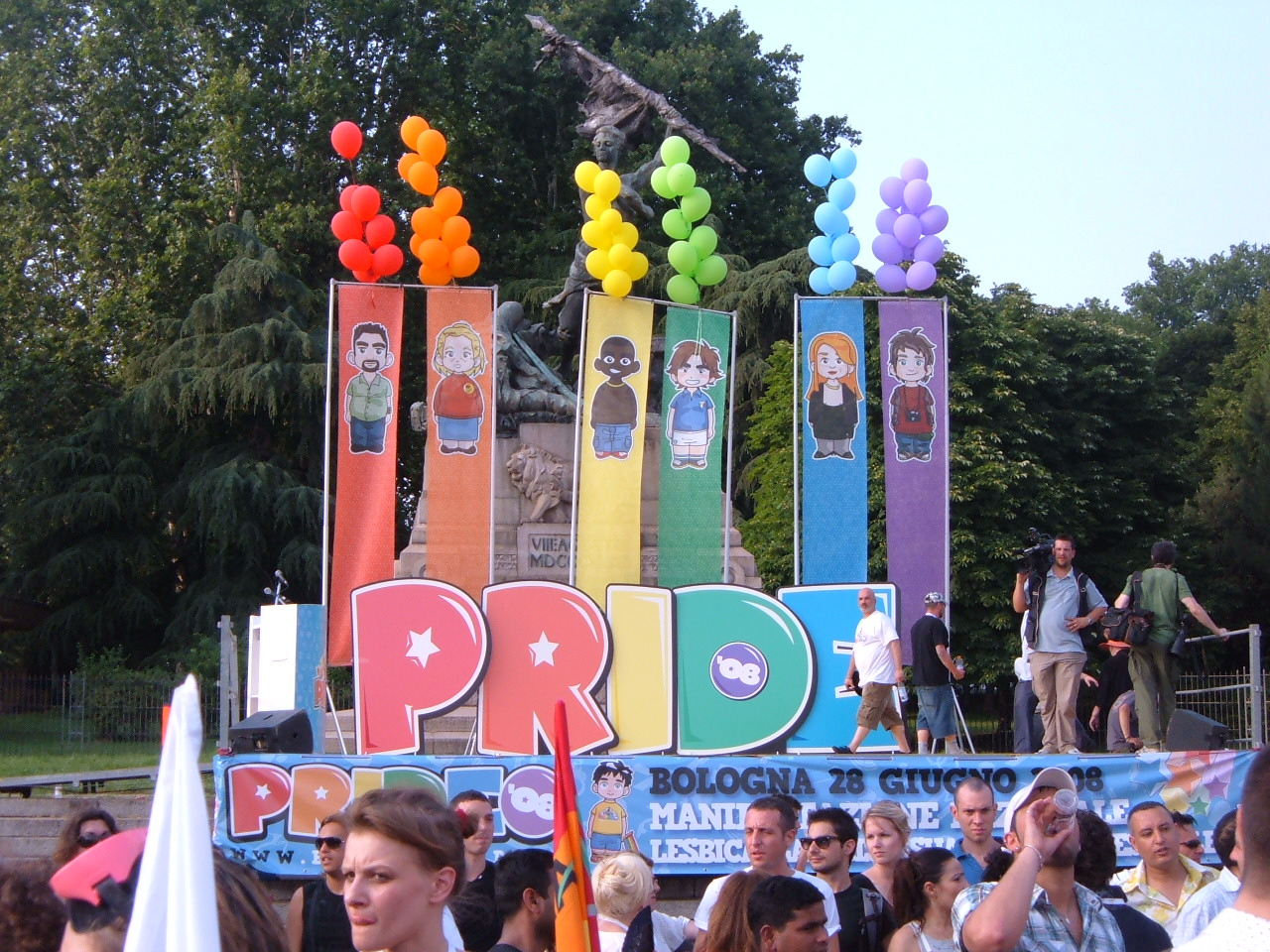
LGBTQ publications, pride parades, and related events, such as this stage at Bologna Pride 2008 in Italy, increasingly drop the LGBT initialism instead of regularly adding new letters and dealing with issues of placement of those letters within the new title

From about 1988, activists began to use the initialism LGBT in the United States. Not until the 1990s within the movement did gay, lesbian, bisexual, and transgender people gain equal respect. Among others, bisexual activist Maggie Rubenstein and transgender activist Susan Stryker pushed to represent bisexual and trans identities explicitly. This spurred some organizations to adopt new names, as the GLBT Historical Society did in 1999. Although the LGBT community has seen much controversy regarding universal acceptance of different member groups (bisexual and transgender individuals, in particular, have sometimes been marginalized by the larger LGBT community), the term LGBT has been a positive symbol of inclusion.

Beginning in the 1990s, the term queer began to be reclaimed from its earlier pejorative use, particularly by radical activists who sought to reject causes they viewed as assimilationist, such as marriage, military inclusion and adoption. Academic fields of study such as queer studies and queer theory build on this reclamation. The term queer is now in use as an umbrella term and as a distinct self-identity term analogous to gay, lesbian, and bisexual. The initialism LGBT eventually evolved to LGBTQ in recognition of the unique meaning of queer within the community.

In 2016, GLAAD's Media Reference Guide states that LGBTQ is the preferred initialism, being more inclusive of younger members of the communities who embrace queer as a self-descriptor. Some people consider queer to be a derogatory term originating in hate speech and reject it, especially among older members of the community.

== Variants ==
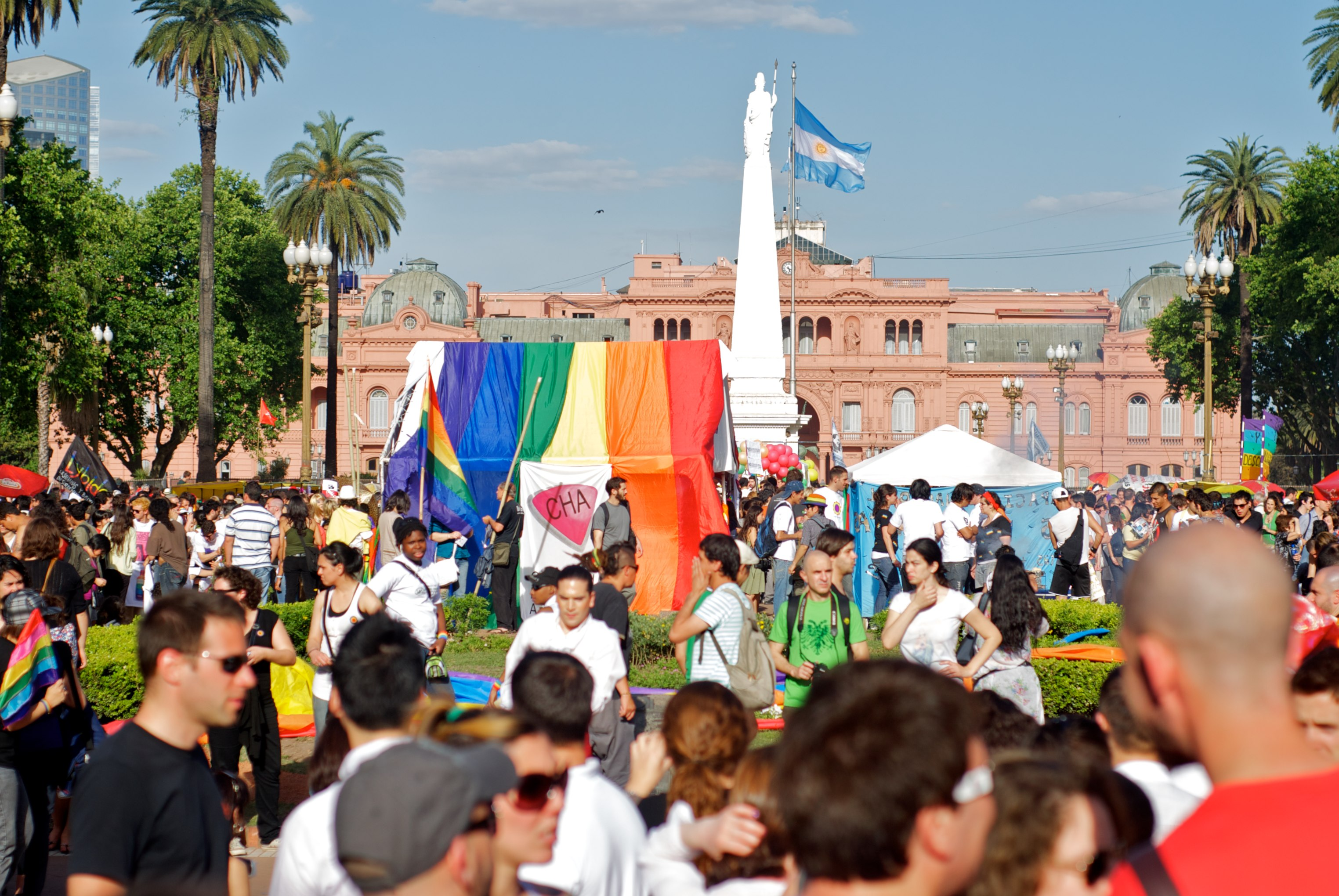
A 2010 pride parade in Plaza de Mayo, Buenos Aires, which used the LGBTIQ initialism

Many variants of the term LGBTQ exist, such as the more inclusive LGBT+, and variations that change the order of the letters or include additional letters. At least some of the components of sexuality (regarding hetero, bi, straight), and also gender are stated to be on different spectrums of sexuality. Other common variants also exist, such as LGBTQIA, with the I standing for intersex and the A standing for asexual, aromantic, or agender, and LGBTQIA+, where "the '+' represents those who are part of the community, but for whom LGBTQ does not accurately capture or reflect their identity".

Longer initialisms have been criticized as confusing or unwieldy, sometimes being referred to as "alphabet soup", and mocked with labels such as LGBTQWERTY, LGBTQXYZ, and alphabet mafia. The implication that the initialism refers to a single community is also controversial.

Although identical in meaning, LGBT may have a more feminist connotation than GLBT as it places the "L" (for "lesbian") first. It gradually replaced GLBT as the most commonly used acronym in the mid-2000s, the political reason being lesbian underrepresentation in comparison to gay men. In Brazil, GLBT replaced GLS (Gays, Lesbians and Sympathizers), while LGBT was adopted in 2008 during the First LGBT National Conference. LGBT may also include additional Qs for "queer" or "questioning" (sometimes abbreviated with a question mark and sometimes used to mean anybody not literally L, G, B or T) producing the variants LGBTQ and LGBTQQ.

The order of the letters has not been standardized. In addition to the variations between the positions of the initial "L" or "G", the mentioned, less common letters, if used, may appear in almost any order. In Hebrew and Peninsular Spanish, LGTB (להט"ב) is used, that is, reversing the letters "B" and "T". Variant terms do not typically represent political differences within the community, but arise simply from the preferences of individuals and groups.

The terms pansexual, omnisexual, fluid and queer-identified are regarded as falling under the umbrella term bisexual (and therefore are considered a part of the bisexual community). Some use LGBT+ to mean "LGBT and related communities". Other variants may have a "U" for "unsure"; a "C" for "curious"; another "T" for "transvestite"; a "TS", "2S", or "2" for "two-spirit" persons; or an "SA" for "straight allies".

The inclusion of straight allies in the LGBTQ initialism has proven controversial, as many straight allies have been accused of using LGBTQ advocacy to gain popularity and status in recent years, and various LGBTQ activists have criticised the heteronormative worldview of certain straight allies. Some may also add a "P" for "polyamorous" or "pangender", an "H" for "HIV-affected", or an "O" for "other". The initialism LGBTIH has seen use in India to encompass the hijra third gender identity and the related subculture.

Adding the term allies to the initialism has sparked controversy, with some seeing the inclusion of ally in place of asexual/aromantic/agender as a form of LGBT erasure. There is also the acronym QUILTBAG (queer and questioning, unsure, intersex, lesbian, transgender and two-spirit, bisexual, asexual and aromantic, and gay and genderqueer). Similarly LGBTIQA+ stands for "lesbian, gay, bisexual, transgender, intersex, queer/questioning, asexual and many other terms (such as non-binary and pansexual)".

The initialism LGBTQIAPK is sometimes used to represent lesbian, gay, bisexual, trans, queer and questioning, intersex, asexual and aromantic, pansexual and panromantic, kink. "Kink", less categorical than “BDSM,” can refer to any non-‘vanilla’ sexuality, ‘vanilla’ being precisely defined as “conventional” and genital-centered sexuality. The inclusion of kinkiness/BDSM in the LGBTQ community has proven controversial.

As of 2025, the Government of Canada's official term is 2SLGBTQI+, with the first two characters standing for two-spirit. Trudeau's new initialism was criticized by some social media users. For some indigenous people, two-spirit invokes a combination of identities, including sexual, gender, cultural, and spiritual. The government previously used LGBTQ2. Prime Minister Justin Trudeau was also criticized for using the 2SLGBTQQIA+ initialism, which some considered too long and confusing.

=== Transgender inclusion ===
The term trans* has been adopted by some groups as a more inclusive alternative to "transgender", where trans (without the asterisk) has been used to describe trans men and trans women, while trans* covers all non-cisgender (genderqueer) identities, including transgender, transsexual, genderqueer, genderfluid, non-binary, genderfuck, genderless, agender, non-gendered, third gender, two-spirit, bigender, and trans man and trans woman. Likewise, the term transsexual commonly falls under the umbrella term transgender, but some transsexual people object to this.

=== Intersex inclusion ===
Those who add intersex people to LGBTQ groups or organizations may use the extended initialism LGBTQI.

The relationship of intersex to lesbian, gay, bisexual, trans, and queer communities is complex, but intersex people are often added to the LGBTQ category to create an LGBTQI community. Some intersex people prefer the initialism LGBTQI, while others would rather that they not be included as part of the term. Emi Koyama describes how inclusion of intersex in LGBTQI can fail to address intersex-specific human rights issues, including creating false impressions "that intersex people's rights are protected" by laws protecting LGBTQ people, and failing to acknowledge that many intersex people are not LGBTQ.

=== Asexual, aromantic and agender inclusion ===
In the early 2010s, asexuality and aromanticism started gaining wider recognition. Around 2015, they were included in the expanded initialism LGBTQIA, with the A standing for asexual, aromantic, commonly grouped together as a-spec along with agender.

Some people have mistakenly claimed the A stands for "ally", but allies are not a marginalized group and mentions of A for ally have regularly sparked controversy as a form of LGBTQ erasure.

== Criticism ==
The initialisms LGBT or GLBT are not agreed to by everyone that they encompass. For example, some argue that transgender and transsexual causes are not the same as that of lesbian, gay, and bisexual (LGB) people. This argument centers on the idea that being transgender or transsexual has to do more with gender identity, or a person's understanding of being or not being a man or a woman irrespective of their sexual orientation. LGB issues can be seen as a matter of sexual orientation or attraction. These distinctions have been made in the context of political action in which LGB goals, such as same-sex marriage legislation and human rights work (which may not include transgender and intersex people), may be perceived to differ from transgender and transsexual goals.

A belief in "lesbian and gay separatism", not to be confused with the related "lesbian separatism", holds that lesbians and gay men form, or should form, a community distinct and separate from other groups normally included in the LGBTQ sphere. While not always appearing in sufficient numbers or organization to be called a movement, separatists are a significant, vocal, and active element within many parts of the LGBTQ community. In some cases separatists will deny the existence or right to equality of bisexual orientations and of transsexuality, sometimes leading to public biphobia and transphobia. In contrast to separatists, Peter Tatchell of the LGBTQ human rights group OutRage! argues that to separate the transgender movement from the LGB would be "political madness", stating that:

Queers are, like transgender people, gender deviant. We don't conform to traditional heterosexist assumptions of male and female behaviour, in that we have sexual and emotional relationships with the same sex. We should celebrate our discordance with mainstream straight norms.

The portrayal of an all-encompassing "LGBT community" or "LGB community" is also disliked by some lesbian, gay, bisexual, and transgender people. Some do not subscribe to or approve of the political and social solidarity, and visibility and human rights campaigning that normally goes with it, including LGBT pride marches and events. Some of them believe that grouping together people with non-heterosexual orientations perpetuates the myth that being gay/lesbian/bi/asexual/pansexual/etc. makes a person deficiently different from other people. These people are often less visible compared to more mainstream gay or LGBTQ activists.

Since this faction is difficult to distinguish from the heterosexual majority, it is common for people to assume all LGBTQ people support LGBTQ liberation and the visibility of LGBTQ people in society, including the right to live one's life differently from the majority. In the 1996 book Anti-Gay, a collection of essays edited by Mark Simpson, the concept of a 'one-size-fits-all' identity based on LGBT stereotypes is criticized for suppressing the individuality of LGBTQ people.

Writing in the BBC News Magazine in 2014, gender-critical feminist Julie Bindel questions whether the various gender groupings now, "bracketed together[,] ... share the same issues, values and goals?" Bindel refers to a number of possible new initialisms for differing combinations and concludes that it may be time for the alliances to either be reformed or go their "separate ways". In 2015, the slogan "Drop the T" was coined to encourage LGBT organizations to stop support of transgender people as they say that sexual orientation, LGB, does not share similarity with gender identity, the T. The campaign has been condemned by many LGBT groups as transphobic.

== Alternatives ==
=== Queer ===
Many have expressed desire for an umbrella term to replace existing initialisms. Queer gained popularity as an umbrella term for sexual and gender minorities in the 21st century. The term remains controversial, particularly among older LGBTQ people who perceive it as offensive due to its historical usage as a slur, as well as those who wish to dissociate themselves from queer radicalism, and those who see it as amorphous or trendy. Some people feel queer is a more politically charged, more powerful term than LGBT. Recent studies have found that 5–20% of non-heterosexuals and 21–36% of trans, nonbinary, and gender nonconforming people identify as queer.

=== Sexual and gender minorities ===
In academic and professional contexts, sexual and gender minorities (SGM) is sometimes used as an alternative to LGBTQ to include individuals who may not self-identify as LGBTQ (such as men who have sex with men, women who have sex with women, and some intersex people). A UK government paper favors SGM because initials like LGBTQ stand for terms that, especially outside the Global North, are "not necessarily inclusive of local understandings and terms used to describe sexual and gender minorities".

Gender, sexual and romantic minorities (GSRM) includes individuals of a minority romantic orientation such as aromanticism.

=== Further umbrella terms ===
Other rare umbrella terms are Gender and Sexual Diversities (GSD), MOGII (Marginalized Orientations, Gender Identities, and Intersex) and MOGAI (Marginalized Orientations, Gender Alignments and Intersex).

SGL (same-gender loving) is sometimes favored among gay male African Americans as a way of distinguishing themselves from what they regard as white-dominated LGBTQ communities.

=== Clinical ===
In public health settings, MSM ("men who have sex with men") is clinically used to describe men who have sex with other men without referring to their sexual orientation, with WSW ("women who have sex with women") also used as an analogous term.

=== Pride ===
While the slogan "Gay Pride" of the 1970s gave way to more inclusive labels like "LGBT Pride" by the 2000s, the idea is now often simply termed pride (without qualification, and often lowercased) in contexts where the LGBTQ aspect can be inferred, such as pride flags or pride parades. When the Princeton University LGBA (Lesbian, Gay, and Bisexual Alliance) was renamed the Pride Alliance in 1999, its co-president stated, "Rather than turn our name into an alphabet soup, we decided to pick a name that would encompass everyone".

=== MVPFAFF ===
MVPFAFF is an abbreviation for Māhū, Vakasalewa, Palopa, Fa'afafine, Akava'ine, Fakaleitī (Leiti), and Fakafifine. This term was developed by Phylesha Brown-Acton in 2010 at the Asia Pacific Games Human Rights Conference. This refers to those in what some call the "rainbow" Pacific Islander community, who may or may not identify with the LGBTQ initialism.

== See also ==
- LGBTQ music
- Androphilia and gynephilia
- Gender and sexual diversity
- LGBTQ symbols
- Takatāpui – the Māori language equivalent of LGBTQ
