= List of LGBTQ acronyms =

This page lists common acronyms relating to LGBTQ (lesbian, gay, bisexual, transgender, and queer) people and the LGBTQ community.

== Key ==
Letter	Meaning
2S	two-spirit (umbrella term for gender-variant Indigenous North Americans)
L	lesbian
G	gay
B	bisexual
T	transgender or transsexual
Q	queer or questioning
I	intersex
A	asexual, aromantic, or agender. Sometimes mistaken for ally.
N	non-binary
P	pansexual, panromantic, or polysexual
+ or *	"plus" or "star." Wildcard indicating the inclusion of additional sexual and gender minorities not explicitly referenced in a given variant of the acronym.

== Variants of LGBTQ ==
- 2SLGBTQI+ (French: 2ELGBTQI+) – Two-Spirit, lesbian, gay, bisexual, transgender, queer, intersex, and additional sexual and gender diverse identities. Official acronym used by the Government of Canada.
- GB or GBT – variants omitting "lesbian", typically when referring only to men.
- GLBT – Commonly used until the 1980s. The L was placed first in honor of lesbians who provided care and donated blood during the AIDS Crisis, and LGBT became the dominant spelling.
- HBTQ – homosexual, bisexual, transgender, and queer. More common in Swedish.
- LB – lesbian and bisexual. Typically referring to women attracted to women when about female sexual orientation or where gender modality is not addressed.
- LBT or LBTQ – variant omitting "gay", typically when referring only to women.
- LGB or GLB – lesbian, gay, and bisexual. Used by activists in the 1990's before and alongside LGBT. In the 21st century, the term is often associated with trans erasure, as in the slogan "Drop the T" and the anti-trans group LGB Alliance. Following Donald Trump's executive order banning references to "gender ideology", several US government websites replaced LGBTQ with LGB.
- LGBPA+ – lesbian, gay, bisexual, pansexual, asexual
- LGBQ
- LGBT
- LGBT+
- LGBTA
- LGBTH, with H for HIV+
- LGBTI
- LGBTIH, with H for hijra
- LGBTQI, LGBTIQ, LGBTQI+, or LGBTIQ+
- LGBTQIA or LGBTQIA+
- LGBTQIAP+, with P for pansexuality or panromantic
- LGBTQIAPD+, with D for demisexual and demiromantic
- LGBTQIAPK+, with K for kink
- LGBTQIAPN+ or LGBTIAPN+, with N for non-binary
- LGBTTQQFAGPBDSM, (Note: Sometimes LGBTTQQPFAGIBDSM or GLBTQQFAGPBDSM) acronym for "lesbian, gay, bisexual, transgender, transsexual, queer, questioning, flexual, asexual, genderfuck, polyamorous, bondage/discipline, dominance/submission, sadism/masochism". The acronym was coined in the early 2000s by LGBTQ students at Wesleyan University, including asexual activist David Jay, who took credit for the inclusion of FAG in the acronym. In 2015, the term's continued inclusion on a campus housing page from that period provoked backlash.
- LGBTTT or LGBTTTIQ, with TTT standing for transgender, transvestite (or travesti), and transsexual.
- LGT, GLT, or GLTT – referring only to monosexual and monoromantic identities. More common in Brazil around the mid 1990s.
- LGTB or GLTB – more common in Spanish.
- QUILTBAG, with U standing for undefined, unlabeled, or unsure
- LGBTQIA+SB, adding S and B for sistergirl and brotherboy, traditional gender roles in indigenous Australian cultures, analogous to trans women and trans men.
- MMIWG2SLGBTQQIA+ – acronym for Missing and Murdered Indigenous Women, Girls, and 2SLGBTQQIA people. The acronym drew attention in April 2026 when NDP Member of Parliament Leah Gazan used it in a House of Commons speech criticizing budget cuts to Indigenous Services Canada and Crown-Indigenous Relations. A clip of Gazan's speech sparked social media backlash ridiculing the acronym's length, and falsely claiming it had replaced 2SLGBTQI+, which remains the standard in Canadian federal writing.

== Alternatives to LGBTQ ==
- GSRD, GSD – gender and sexual (and romantic) diversity
- SGM, GSM, GSRM – gender, sexual (and sometimes sex to include non-endosex people), and romantic minority
- SGMY – sexual and gender minority youth.
- MOGAI or MOGII – marginalized orientations, gender alignments and intersex
- SOGI – sexual orientation and gender identity.
- MVPFAFF – Māhū, Vakasalewa, Palopa, Fa'afafine, Akava'ine, Fakaleitī (Leiti), and Fakafifine (identities in the Pacific Islander community)
- SOGIE – sexual orientation and gender identity and expression.
- SOGIESC – sexual orientation, gender identity and (gender) expression, and sex characteristics.
- SSOGIE – sex, sexual orientation, gender identity and expression.

== Same gender attraction ==
- MLM / WLW – men loving men / women loving women (or non-binary people), regardless of sexual or romantic orientation as gay, bi, pan, etc.
- MSM / WSW – men who have sex with men / women who have sex with women. Used primarily in public health as a behavioral category distinct from sexual orientation.
- NBLNB – non-binary loving non-binary.
- SGA, same-gender attraction
- SGL – same-gender loving. This term is used by some in the Black community to avoid identity terms considered Eurocentric.

=== Distinguish from ===
- SSA - same-sex attraction / same-sex attracted. A phrase used by some religious groups in the late 20th century as part of the ex-gay movement. From the 2010s, it has also been used in non-religious circles, either as a non-prescriptive term to include those of different sexual orientations without naming specific labels, or heterosexual-identified men and women who have same-sex partners or same-sex attraction, or as a trans-exclusionary term to specify male-male and female-female same-sex relationships.

== Sex and gender ==
- AFAB – assigned female at birth
- AGAB/ASAB – assigned gender at birth / assigned sex at birth.
- AMAB – assigned male at birth
- DSD – disorders of sex development (or differences in sex development). Describes intersex variations. The former is considered pathologizing by some intersex people.
- FLINTA* – German acronym of frauen (women), lesben (lesbian), intersexuelle (intersex), nicht-binäre (non-binary), transgender and agender.
- FTM/MTF – female-to-male or male-to-female respectively. Considered outdated; trans man and trans woman are preferred.
- FFS – facial feminization surgery
- GAC – gender-affirming care; the medical aspect of gender transition
- GAHT – gender-affirming hormone therapy
- GNC – gender non-conforming
- ITNB+ – intersex, trans, non-binary, and gender nonconforming. More common in Portugal.
- NB (sometimes spelled "enby") – non-binary. Occasionally confused for "non-Black" (also abbreviated NB).
- PGP – preferred gender pronouns. Sometimes proscribed in favor of just "pronouns", to avoid implying that one's pronouns are just a preference, or that they necessarily indicate one's gender.
- PTP – person with a transgender parent
- TGD – transgender and gender diverse
- TGE – transgender and gender expansive
- TGI – transgender, gender diverse, and intersex. The term is also inclusive of people who identify as transsexual.
- TGNC – trans and gender nonconforming
- TQI+, QTI+, or QIT+, meaning queer, trans, or intersex, and other groups.
- T4T – trans for trans; transgender people primarily or exclusively seeking relationships with other transgender people.
- VSC – variations in sex characteristics. An alternative term for intersex variations.
- XtX, XtF, XtM, FtX and MtX, alternative terms that are used in place of FtM or MtF. X represents nonbinary or undefined genders. F stands for female and M stands for male.

== Others ==
- GSA – gay–straight alliance, or genders and sexualities alliance.
- GLA – gay and lesbian alliance
- GLOW – "gay, lesbian, or whatever"
- QPR – queerplatonic relationship; committed intimate partnerships which are non-romantic
- QPOC – queer people of color.
- QSA, meaning queer–straight alliance.
- QTPOC/QTIPOC, standing for queer and trans people of color or queer, trans, and intersex people of color.
- QTWOC, standing for queer and trans women of color.

== See also ==
- Lists of acronyms
- LGBT slang
