= LGBTQ rights in Tonga =

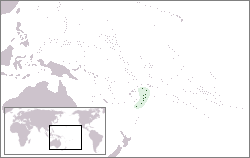
- Tonga
- Legal status: Male illegal, female legal
- Penalty: Up to 10 years imprisonment (not enforced, legalisation proposed)
- Discrimination protections: None

Family rights
- Recognition of relationships: No recognition of same-sex relationships
- Adoption: No

Lesbian, gay, bisexual, transgender and queer (LGBTQ) people in Tonga face legal challenges not experienced by non-LGBTQ residents. Male homosexuality is illegal in Tonga, with a maximum penalty of 10 years imprisonment, but the law is not enforced.

Tongan society is very socially conservative and highly religious. Tonga strictly observes the Sabbath. On Sundays, any recreational activities undertaken outside of island resorts may be seen as provocative. The Tongan Government requires all religious references on broadcast media to conform to mainstream Christian beliefs. The mixture of conservative values and colonial-era laws has resulted in a climate of fear, discrimination and homophobia for LGBTQ people. Along with Kiribati, Tonga is the only Polynesian country that has not signed or expressed support for the 2011 "joint statement on ending acts of violence and related human rights violations based on sexual orientation and gender identity" at the United Nations, which condemns violence and discrimination against LGBTQ people.

Many gay and lesbian Tongans emigrate to Australia or New Zealand in order to live a more open life that they may not get to experience in their native land.

== History ==
Tonga, much like the rest of Polynesia, used to be tolerant of same-sex relationships and transgender people before the arrival of Christianity. The arrival of the European missionaries in the late 18th century quickly changed societal acceptance, and the first anti-gay laws in Tonga were enacted. The missionaries converted the local population to Christianity.

=== Fakaleiti ===
Traditionally, Tongan culture has been supportive of transgender people in the form of the fakaleiti (also known as the fakafefine; literally like a lady). The fakaleiti, similarly to the fa'afafine of Samoa and the māhū of Hawaii, are people who were born male but act, dress and behave as female. They have traditionally been accepted by Tongan society. However, in modern times, Tonga has a powerful religious community, and recently has seen a rise in fundamentalism and religious fanaticism. As such, the fakaleiti tend to face regular discrimination and stigma, despite being an integral part of Tongan culture. Cross-dressing is illegal in Tonga under laws inherited by the former British Empire.

The fakaleiti traditionally would play an important domestic role in Tonga communal life, and would often be called upon to aid the royal family.

Despite discrimination and harassment, the fakaleiti community organises an annual transgender beauty pageant competition called the Miss Galaxy Pageant, which is sponsored by the Tonga Government and local businesses.

== Legality of same-sex sexual activity ==
Male consensual same-sex sexual activity, as well as heterosexual sodomy, is illegal in Tonga under the Criminal Offences Act (Tongan: Lao ki he Ngaahi Hia) with a maximum penalty of 10 years imprisonment. The offenders may also be whipped as a punishment if convicted.

Section 136. Sodomy and bestiality. Whoever shall be convicted of the crime of sodomy with another person ... shall be liable at the discretion of the Court to be imprisoned for any period not exceeding ten years....

Male rape is also illegal in Tonga:

Section 137. Assault with intent to commit sodomy. It is an offence for a person to assault another person with intent to commit sodomy.

Section 138. Indecent assault on man. It is an offence for a person to make an indecent assault on a man.

Section 139. Attempted sodomy, indecent assault upon a male. Whoever shall attempt to commit the said abominable crime of sodomy or shall be guilty of an assault with intent to commit the same or of any indecent assault upon any male person shall be liable at the direction of the Court to imprisonment for any term not exceeding 10 years.

Section 140. Evidence. On the trial of any person upon a charge of sodomy or carnal knowledge it shall not be necessary to prove the actual emission of seed but the offence shall be deemed complete on proof of penetration only.

Section 142. Whipping for certain offences. Whenever any male person shall be convicted of any offence against sections ... 136 and 139 of this Act the Court may, in its discretion in lieu of or in addition to any sentence of imprisonment authorised under this Act order the person so convicted to be whipped in accordance with the provisions of section 31 of this Act.

=== Decriminalisation efforts ===
In late 2016, the Tonga Leitis Association, an LGBTQ advocacy group, launched a national consultation with governments officials in order to decriminalise homosexuality and cross-dressing.

According to the Attorney General, there have, as of 2016, never been any sodomy convictions on consensual same-sex activity.

== Recognition of same-sex relationships ==
The Kingdom of Tonga does not recognise same-sex sexual relationships or unions in any form.

== Discrimination protections ==
Tongan law does not address discrimination on account of sexual orientation or gender identity in employment or the provision of goods and services.

The Judicial Code of Conduct 2010 states that "a judge shall be aware of, and understand, diversity in society and differences arising from various sources, including but not limited to race, colour, sex, religion, national origin, caste, disability, age, marital status, sexual orientation, social and economic status and other like causes ("irrelevant grounds")." The legislation prohibits judges from "manifest[ing] bias or prejudice towards any person or group on irrelevant grounds."

== Living conditions ==
Tongan society is very socially conservative and highly religious. In addition, it has recently seen a rise in fundamentalism and religious fanaticism, which has been associated with an increase in hatred and discrimination towards LGBTQ people and fakaleitis.

Much like the rest of Polynesia, public displays of affection tend to be frowned upon, regardless of sexual orientation.

=== Activism ===
There is an LGBTQ association known as the Tonga Leitis Association, which is headed by Joey Mataele, an influential individual in Tongan society. In 2018, Cyclone Gita, which destroyed the Tonga parliament building, damaged the organisation's drop-in centre and shelter.

The 2012 Summer Olympics flag-bearer for Tonga was openly gay Amini Fonua. Fonua has become an advocate for LGBTQ rights, speaking with Tongan government officials about the need to reform Tonga's colonial-era laws that criminalise homosexuality.

In 2018, Frederica Tuita Filipe, daughter of Princess Royal Salote Mafileʻo Pilolevu Tuita, expressed her opposition to homophobia and discrimination. In 2021, noted LGBTQ activist Polikalepo Kefu was murdered near his home near Muʻa.

== Statistics ==
According to 2017 estimates from UNAIDS, there were about 400 transgender people in Tonga.

== Summary table ==
Same-sex sexual activity legal	No (For males; not enforced, legalization proposed)/ Yes (For females)
Equal age of consent	No (For males)/ Yes (For females)
Anti-discrimination laws in employment only	No
Anti-discrimination laws in the provision of goods and services	No
Anti-discrimination laws in all other areas (Incl. indirect discrimination, hate speech)	No / Yes (Only in judicial cases)
Same-sex marriages	No
Recognition of same-sex couples	No
Stepchild adoption by same-sex couples	No
Joint adoption by same-sex couples	No
LGBTQ people allowed to serve openly in the military	No
Right to change legal gender	No Laws against cross-dressing.
Access to IVF for lesbians	No
Commercial surrogacy for gay male couples	No
MSMs allowed to donate blood	No

== See also ==
- Human rights in Tonga
- LGBTQ rights in Oceania
