= LGBTQ rights in Fiji =

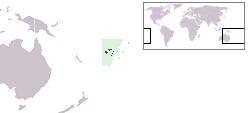
- Fiji
- Legal status: De facto legal since 2006; Officially legal since 2010
- Gender identity: Not known
- Military: Not known
- Discrimination protections: Constitutional protections since 1997

Family rights
- Recognition of relationships: No
- Adoption: No

Lesbian, gay, bisexual, transgender, and queer (LGBTQ) rights in Fiji have evolved rapidly over the years. In 1997, Fiji became the second country in the world after South Africa to explicitly protect against discrimination based on sexual orientation in its Constitution. In 2009, the Constitution was abolished. The new Constitution, promulgated in September 2013, bans discrimination based on sexual orientation and gender identity or expression. However, same-sex marriage remains banned in Fiji and reports of societal discrimination and bullying are not uncommon.

Diverse Voices and Action (DIVA) for Equality, founded in 2011, the Rainbow Pride Foundation, founded in 2008, the Amithi Fiji Project, SAN Fiji, Oceania Pride, founded in 2009 and the Drodrolagi Movement, a student group, are among Fiji's main LGBTQ rights groups.

== History ==
Similarly to the fa'afafine of Samoa, the māhū of Hawaii and the whakawāhine of New Zealand, Fiji has a traditional third gender population. Such individuals are known as the vaka sa lewa lewa (vakasalewalewa). They are assigned male at birth but dress, act and behave as female, and have traditionally been accepted by Fijian society. The modern Fijian word qauri is roughly equivalent to the English word "gay".

== Law regarding same-sex sexual activity ==
In 2005, Australian tourist Thomas McCosker had consensual sex with an adult named Dhirendra Nadan. The men were tried and jailed under the nation's sodomy law, but the conviction was subsequently overturned in August 2005 by the nation's highest court as violating the Constitution.

In the same year, then-Prime Minister Laisenia Qarase defended his nation's criminal laws against homosexuality as being based on the Bible. In contrast, then-Vice President Ratu Joni Madraiwiwi stated that he felt that gay people should have their right to privacy protected.

In 2006, the Fijian High Commissioner in New Zealand confirmed that there is now a policy not to arrest gay men for consensual gay sex.

Since 1 February 2010, private, adult, consensual and non-commercial male and female homosexual conduct has been legal under the Crimes Decree 2009.

== Recognition of same-sex relationships ==
Fiji family laws do not provide legal recognition of same-sex marriage or civil unions. Since 2002, the law has expressly banned same-sex marriage.

On 26 March 2013, Prime Minister Frank Bainimarama expressed opposition to the idea of same-sex marriage. Answering a question raised by a caller on a radio talk-back programme, he stated that same-sex marriage "will not be allowed because it is against religious beliefs". In April 2013, a support group representing LGBTQ students, Drodrolagi Movement, called for a discussion on the issue. In January 2016, the Prime Minister reiterated his opposition to same-sex marriage, saying "there will be no same-sex marriage in Fiji" and suggested that lesbian couples seeking to marry move to Iceland.

In 2019, after speculations that some churches support the idea of same-sex marriage, the Prime Minister reiterated his opposition to same-sex marriage, saying, "As long as we are in government – Fiji will not allow same-sex marriage", because Fiji is a "God-fearing country". His stance was backed by the Catholic Church in Fiji, the Methodist Church of Fiji and Rotuma, the Shree Sanatan Dharm Partindhi and the Fiji Muslim League, which all voiced their opposition to same-sex marriage. Director of the Fiji Human Rights and Anti-Discrimination Commission Ashwin Raj said that "same-sex marriage is not a right" and that there needs to be more clarity on what the Constitution of Fiji states on the issue of same-sex marriage, and that "the priority must be towards addressing discrimination faced by the LGBTI community". He also called for "a calm and rational debate" about the issue. The Fiji Coalition on Human Rights said it was "disappointed and disturbed" by the Prime Minister's stance, arguing that his remarks go against the basis of Fiji's laws and contradicted his commitment to the United Nations Human Rights Council. It called on authorities to get together and discuss progression towards the inclusion of the LGBTQ community in Fiji.

Fijian-New Zealand based activist, Shaneel Lal has called for the Fijian government to allow same-sex marriage. Former President of Ireland Mary Robinson has also called on the Pacific leaders to decriminalise homosexuality.

In 2022, former Director of Human Rights and University of Fiji's Dean of Justice Professor Shaista Shameem stated that the Marriage Act which limits the union of two people to only between a male and a female can be contested in courts. In response, Director of the Fiji Human Rights and Anti-Discrimination Commission Ashwin Raj said that "the issues are far more complex and the Fijian Constitution provides fertile ground for developing jurisprudence". He also added that the priority first is to address the violence and discrimination faced by the LGBTQ community. Leaders of the People's Alliance Party and the National Federation Party evaded questions regarding the legalisation of same-sex marriage. Instead, both leaders responded that they would respect the rights of every citizen. Sitiveni Rabuka added that "marriage in Fiji is governed by the Marriage Act" and until that changes, it is up to the government to change it.

== Discrimination protections ==
Discrimination in employment based on sexual orientation is banned in Fiji under the Employment Relations Promulgation 2007.

In 1997, the Constitution included a provision that specifically prohibited government discrimination on the basis of sexual orientation. In 2009, the Fiji Constitution was formally abolished by the President.

In April 2013, the Attorney General, Aiyaz Sayed-Khaiyum, stated that a new constitution, which was supposed to be finalized sometime in 2013, would ban discrimination based on sexual orientation. The Constitution was promulgated in September 2013 and includes a provision banning discrimination based on sexual orientation and gender identity or expression. Article 26(3) of the Constitution reads as follows:

A person must not be unfairly discriminated against, directly or indirectly on the grounds of his or her

(a) actual or supposed personal characteristics or circumstances, including race, culture, ethnic or social origin, colour, place of origin, sex, gender, sexual orientation, gender identity and expression, birth, primary language, economic or social or health status, disability, age, religion, conscience, marital status or pregnancy; or
(b) opinions or beliefs, except to the extent that those opinions or beliefs involve harm to others or the diminution of the rights or freedoms of others,

or on any other ground prohibited by this Constitution.

It was reported in 2013 that the Government had included sexual orientation and gender identity in an anti-hate speech law as well as a law dealing with discrimination in certain businesses.

== Conversion therapy ==
Conversion therapy has a negative effect on the lives of LGBTQ people, and can lead to low self-esteem, depression and suicide ideation.

The Mental Health Decree 2010 states that people are not to be considered mentally ill if they refuse or fail to express a particular sexual orientation, and prohibits any conversion therapy by registered health professionals in the field of mental health.

Activist Kalisito Biaukula has been outspoken about how for many LGBTQ+ people in Fiji, physical violence and domestic abuse are a form of familial conversion therapy.

== Blood donation ==
In April 2017, the Fijian Ministry of Health confirmed that gay and bisexual men are banned from donating blood. The Ministry's statement came after a gay man attempted to donate blood but was refused because of his sexual orientation. Ashwin Raj, the Fiji Human Rights and Anti-Discrimination Commission Director, later said that he would investigate the policy, arguing that it is unconstitutional and discriminatory.

== Social conditions ==
A majority of citizens affiliate with Methodist or Catholic denominations, which traditionally view same-sex sexuality and transgender identities negatively. The third largest religious group, about 6% of the population, are Muslim, who also tend to view homosexuality and cross-dressing as sinful behavior that needs to be fixed. While other, generally more tolerant, religious traditions do exist in Fiji they tend to have smaller memberships. These prevailing religious mores tend to influence the status of LGBTQ people within society.

Reports of hate crimes against LGBTQ people in Fiji are rare, although there has been some, possible, high-profile case of a same-sex couple being the victims of a bias motivated crime. On 1 July 2001, Red Cross leader John Maurice Scott and his partner, Gregory Scrivener, were brutally murdered in Suva, in an apparent homophobic attack with a possible political motive. Scott and Scrivener's story has become the subject of a 2008 New Zealand documentary, An Island Calling. In September 2017, a gay student was found dead in Nasinu. In May 2018, a young transgender woman was brutally murdered in Suva. Lack of trust in the police due to possible harassment likely discourages LGBTQ people and couples from reporting anti-gay violence or hateful discrimination.

Social mores regarding sexual orientation and gender identity tend to be conservative, with little public support for LGBTQ rights. While some human rights activists do some low-key work on LGBTQ rights concerns, the Government has, in the past, cancelled gay pride marches from taking place. On 17 May 2013, the International Day Against Homophobia, Transphobia and Biphobia (IDAHOTB), LGBTQ activists organised activities to promote LGBTQ rights and equality. Drodrolagi Movement, an LGBTQ advocacy group, said that discrimination and bullying remain problems in Fiji. In 2017, an event celebrating IDAHOTB was held in the capital of Suva. The event was attended by many LGBTQ activists as well as religious figures.

While not illegal, visitors are advised that public displays of affection are generally considered offensive.

Fiji's first pride parade was held on 17 May 2018 to coincide with the International Day Against Homophobia. The march took place in Lautoka, Fiji's second largest city, and was the first such march in a Pacific island nation (excluding New Zealand and some dependent territories, such as Hawaii). Local police provided an escort for the participants. Former President Epeli Nailatikau spoke at the event.

== Political support ==
Political parties in Fiji have mixed views on LGBTQ issues. While support for basic LGBTQ rights (such as discrimination protections) is near-universal, in contrast, there is little political support for legalising same-sex marriage.

The centrist FijiFirst party, which ruled Fiji under Frank Bainimarama from the 2006 coup d'état until the 2022 general election, specifically outlined in the country's new Constitution that discrimination on the basis of sexual orientation and sex (including gender, which is not distinguished from sex under Fijian law) is a hate crime. However, the party is also against same-sex marriage.

In 2022, National Federation Party (NFP) became the first political party to ever endorse an openly LGBTQ candidate, after endorsing Divina Loloma, a transgender woman. All People's Party (APP) leader Tuiloma Tawaivuna criticised the NFP over her nomination, claiming that transgender people are an "abomination" and "Biblically wrong". After a hoax spread online claiming that the NFP supported same-sex marriage, the party was forced to confirm that it did not support same-sex marriage.

== Summary table ==
Same-sex sexual activity legal	Yes (Since 2010)
Equal age of consent (16)	Yes (Since 2010)
Anti-discrimination laws in employment only	Yes (Since 2007)
Anti-discrimination laws in the provision of goods and services	Yes (Since 2013)
Anti-discrimination laws in all other areas (Incl. indirect discrimination, hate speech)	Yes (Since 2013)
Same-sex marriages	No
Recognition of same-sex couples	No
Stepchild adoption by same-sex couples	No
Joint adoption by same-sex couples	No
LGBTQ people allowed to serve openly in the military	
Right to change legal gender	
Homosexuality declassified as an illness	Yes
Conversion therapy banned	Yes (Since 2010)
Access to IVF for lesbians	No
Commercial surrogacy for gay male couples	No
MSMs allowed to donate blood	No

== See also ==
- Human rights in Fiji
- LGBT rights in Oceania
