= Foliaki =

Foliaki is a surname. Notable people with the surname include:

- Papiloa Foliaki (born 1935), Tongan politician
- Simione Foliaki (born 1981), Tongan rugby league footballer
- Soane Lilo Foliaki (1933–2013), Tongan Roman Catholic bishop
