= Miss Galaxy Pageant =

Beauty pageant in Tonga

Miss Galaxy Pageant is a beauty pageant held in Nukuʻalofa, Tongatapu in Tonga, where contestants are members of Tonga's fakaleiti community. Organised by the Tonga Leitis' Association (TLA) it raises awareness of LGBTQ+ rights issues and has become a regular event in the Tongan cultural calendar.

== Background ==
Emerging from the 1970s disco scene in Tonga, the Miss Galaxy pageant was established in 1993, organised by the Tonga Leitis' Association (TLA) as a means to raise awareness of LGBTQ+ issues in Tonga, and to raise money for their programmes. Structured in a similar way to Tonga's Miss Heilala pageant, Miss Galaxy has become more popular of the two. In addition, whilst Miss Heilala contestants are expected to "exhibit their Tongan-ness", Miss Galaxy contestants express themselves as "cosmopolitan ... using English". Many of the Miss Galaxy contestants have a financial impetus to compete, in contrast to the Miss Heilala contestants who are often wealthier.

== Organisation and sponsorship ==
The pageant usually takes place in July each year as part of the Heilala Festival. The director of the pageant is Joey Joleen Mataele. The Patron for the Miss Galaxy is the Honorable Salote Lupepau'u Salamasina Purea Vahine Ari'i o'e Hau Tuita, the eldest daughter of Her Royal Highness Princess Salote Mafile'o Pilolevu Tuita. The pageant attracts audiences of up to five thousand people each year. A panel of judges rate the Miss Galaxy contestants in a number of different talent and appearance categories. International academics, celebrities and members of the royal family have acted as judges in various years.

Originally held at the Dateline Hotel, a change in its ownership to an adherent of evangelical Christianity, in 1997 the competition moved to a new location - the Queen Salote Memorial Hall. In 2010 the pageant was hosted at the Four Seasons Resort, 'Umusi for the first time. Contestants create costumes and model under several categories, including: 'Red Creation' which is a tribute to those affected by HIV; 'Condom Creation' which is designed to raise awareness around condom use; 'Rainbow Attire' is a tribute to rainbow families. During the pageant event, the TLA sees its highest distribution of condoms. 'The pageant also has a HIV testing booth, where attendees can be tested whilst attending the event.

Local Tongan businesses sponsor the event, a demonstration of their support for changing attitudes to LGBTQ+ rights. In 2002 Air New Zealand began sponsorship of the pageant and its official name became the Air New Zealand Galaxy Queen Beauty Pageant. In 2017 the pageant was sponsored by Digicel Tonga. The 2021 pageant's theme was 'Ending Gender-based Violence'.

== Reception ==
Days after the inaugural event in 1993, a transphobic educational official suggested that schools had a role in the increasingly visible number of leitis in Tonga.

In 2018 pageant contestants were featured in the documentary Leitis in Waiting which portrayed the difficulties faced by the leitis community in Tonga. The same year, the pageant celebrated its silver jubilee, celebrating twenty-five years of success.

== Pageant winners ==
- 1993: Vivian Charlie.
- 1994: Fiona Gibson.
- 1995: London Koloamatangi.
- 1996: Lee Mubai Yang.
- 1997: Shima Langi (Vaisima Langi)
- 1998: Kumu Hina.
- 1999: Janice Fruean-Zimmerman Baice.
- 2000: Ireen Shauna.
- 2001: Lee Mubai Yang (Feliuaki Taulanga).
- 2002: Pauline Edward Taufa.
- 2003: Sonia Honey.
- 2004: Phylesha Brown-Acton.
- 2005: Sabrina Latu.
- 2006: Coco Chandelier.
- 2007: Maya Douglas.
- 2008: Selena D'Angelo.
- 2009: Fatima Gyllenhaal Halafihi.
- 2010: Tararina Brown.
- 2011: Venus Brown.
- 2012-2013: Jayleen Veer Kaho
- 2014: Leila Heihei.
- 2015-2016: Diamond Vea.
- 2017: Natasha Finau.
- 2018: Kaina Handerson Tauvaka.
- 2019-2020: Marina Cocobutter.
- 2021-2022: Lavenda Mosay
- 2023: Camilla Hansen
- 2024: Giovanna Lissha Mafi

== External resources ==
- Photos from the 2004 Competition
- More Photos from 2004
- More Photos from 2004
- Miss Galaxy Queen 07-08, Coco Chandelier - Knock on Wood
