= Vakasalewalewa =

Fijian gender

- Classification: Gender identity

Other terms
- Associated terms: Fakaleiti, Two-spirit, Trans woman, Akava'ine, Māhū, Pinapinaaine, Palopa

Demographics
- Culture: Fijian
Regions with significant populations
- Polynesia

Vakasalewalewa are people from Fiji who were assigned male at birth but who have a feminine gender expression. In Fiji, this is understood as a traditional third gender identity, culturally specific to the country.

== Etymology ==
The term comes from Fijian and translates as "acting in the manner of a woman"; it has connotations of a traditional cultural way of life. A related modern term is qauri, which is used to collectively describe all non-heteronormative male-bodied people in Fiji. Another related term is viavialewa, which translates as "wanting to be a woman".

Vakasalewalewa is included in the acronym MVPFAFF+ (mahu, vakasalewalewa, palopa, fa'afafine, akava'ine, fakaleiti or leiti, fakafifine, and other), coined by Phylesha Brown-Acton, to "enhance Pasifika gender diversity awareness in addition to the term LGBTQI".

== History and culture ==
Colonial historical records are silent on the role of vakasalewalewa in Fijian society. However, like many other gender identities in Oceania, such as akava'ine in the Cook Islands or Fa'afafine in Samoa, that these identities existed and were valued in pre-modern Fiji. Activist Shaneel Lal argues that prior to colonisation, vakasalewalewa were integral to native Fijijan society. Lal claims that colonisation stripped Fijians of their rich queer identities and conditioned them with homophobia, transphobia and queerphobia.

According to Joey Joleen Mataele, many vakasalewalewa work in hospitality industries.

== Reception ==
In Geir Henning Presterudsten's study of qauri communities, they reported that many rejected the label of vakasalewalewa, believing it to be "old-fashioned" or "restrictive". However, people who ascribed to vakasalewalewa found greater acceptance in Fiji, than those who identified as qauri.

== Notable vakasalewalewa ==
- Kalisito Biaukula - broadcaster and human rights activist.
- Shaneel Lal - queer and indigenous rights activist.

== See also ==
- LGBT
