= Fakafifine =

Niuean gender

- Classification: Gender identity

Other terms
- Associated terms: Fakaleiti, Two-spirit, Trans woman, Akava'ine, Māhū, Pinapinaaine

Demographics
- Culture: Niuean
Regions with significant populations
- Polynesia

Fakafifine are people from Niue, who were born assigned male at birth but who have a feminine gender expression. In Niue this is understood as a third gender, culturally specific to the country.

== Etymology ==
The term comes from Niuean and is composed of the prefix faka- (in the manner of) and the suffix -fifine (woman) and is defined in Niue Language Dictionary as 'to behave like a woman' or 'to be effeminate'. A related term is fakataane which means 'to behave like a man'.

Fakafifine is included in the acronym MVPFAFF+ (mahu, vakasalewalewa, palopa, fa'afafine, akava'ine, fakaleiti or leiti, fakafifine, and other), coined by Phylesha Brown-Acton, to "enhance Pasifika gender diversity awareness in addition to the term LGBTQI".

== Notable fakafifine ==
- Phylesha Brown-Acton (born 1976), human rights activist.
