= Valery Wichman =

President of Te Tiare Association

Valery Wichman is an LGBT rights activist from the Cook Islands. She is the former president of the Te Tiare Association, the first association for LGBTQI++ in the Cook Islands, and has been involved with the group since its inception in 2008.

== Early life and education ==
Wichman grew up in Rarotonga. She began attending the University of Auckland in 2007.

== Career ==
In 2016 Wichman was admitted to the High Court in New Zealand as a barrister and solicitor.

Wichman works as a solicitor and barrister for the Cook Islands' government, and has worked in the role of Director of Central Policy and Planning.

== Activism ==
Through the Te Tiare Association, Wichman has worked since 2019 to petition the government to repeal the country's laws which criminalises homosexuality.

== Honours and recognition ==
In 2016, Wichman was given a Queen's Young Leaders Award for her work in advancing LGBT rights.

Wichman was chosen for the University of Auckland's 2021 40 Under 40 list. In February 2024 she was awarded the Franco-German Prize for Human Rights and the Rule of Law, becoming the first Pacific person to receive the award.

== Personal life ==
Wichman is a trans woman.
