= Temata =

Temata is a surname. Notable people with the surname include:

- Farrell Temata (c. 1944–2013), New Zealand rugby union player and coach
- Karl Temata (born 1978), New Zealand rugby league player
- Sonya Apa Temata, New Zealand activist and nurse
- Tessa Temata (c. 1967–2019), New Zealand diplomat
