= Mataele =

Mataele is a surname. Notable people with the surname include:

- Joey Joleen Mataele, Tongan transgender activist
- Manasa Mataele (born 1996), Fijian-Tongan rugby union player
- Stan Mataele (born 1963), American football player
