= Phylesha Brown-Acton =

New Zealand activist (born 1976)

Phylesha Brown-Acton MNZM
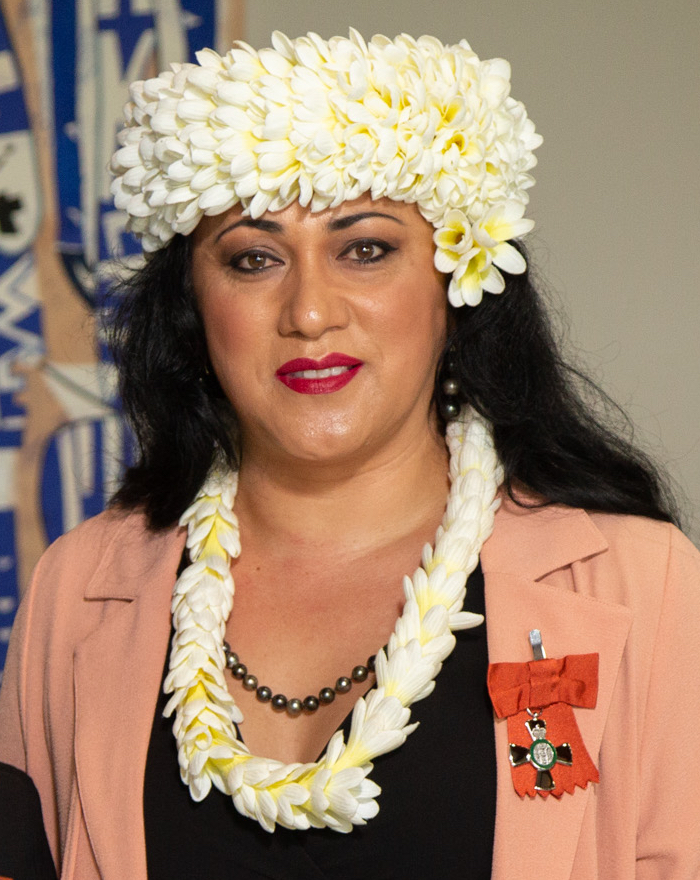
- Brown-Acton in 2019
- Born: February 1976 (age 50); Niue
- Citizenship: New Zealand
- Occupations: Human rights activist; social worker; dancer
- Honours: New Zealand Order of Merit
- Website: https://finepasifika.org.nz/

Phylesha Brown-Acton MNZM (born February 1976) is a Niuean fakafifine LGBTQ+ rights activist. In 2019, she was appointed a Member of the New Zealand Order of Merit to recognize her work with LGBTQ+ communities from the Pacific countries.

== Biography ==
Brown-Acton was born in February 1976 in Niue. Her mother was from Niue and her father from Australia. She has seven siblings. Assigned male at birth, she knew from the age of four that she identified as a girl. At school, Brown-Acton was bullied by both students and teachers; at home her father was violent. Due to her complex home life, she was raised by her great-aunt - her grandfather's sister. When she was fifteen years old she socially transitioned and began to receive hormonal therapy in her 20s.

In her first career, Brown-Acton was a dancer, performing internationally, including at the Venice Biennale. In 2006 she began work for the Pacific Peoples Project at the New Zealand AIDS Foundation as project coordinator; in 2009 she managed their International Development Programme. She has been outspoken about sexual violence that trans people face, including in 2007 when a group of ten men attempted to gang-rape her and the Tongan police reportedly victim-blamed her. She has also been vocal about the discrimination trans people face even obtaining services such as life insurance.

At the 2011 Asia-Pacific Outgames Human Rights Conference, Brown-Acton was the first person to introduce a Pacific specific acronym for western LGBTQ+ communities: MVPFAFF - Mahu, Vakasalewalewa, Palopa, Fa’afafine, Akava’ine, Fakafifine and Fakaleiti/leiti. Whilst the western umbrella term LGBTQ+ is often used try to include Pacific gender identities, Brown-Acton has discussed how MVPFAFF identities are genders with specific cultural distinctions between them. This acronym was later extended to include a plus sign: MVPFAFF+. This academic activism in conference spaces as it disrupts western constructs of Pacific gender identities. She has also spoken openly about the colonial roots of homophobia in many countries in the Pacific.

In 2014, she joined the board of Auckland Pride. The same year she worked at Pacific Islands Safety & Prevention Project Inc. as service support manager.

Brown-Acton is Executive Director of F’ine Pasifika, an LGBTQI+ rights organisation based in New Zealand which she founded in 2015. In 2018, she spoke at the Human Rights Defenders World Summit. She is on the Steering Committee of the Asia Pacific Transgender Network (APTN). Other roles have included as an advisor to the Transgender Health Services Advisory Group, and a trustee of INA Maori. In 2020, she was selected as a member of OutRight International's Beijing+25 Fellowship program. Brown-Acton is number 82 in the 100 Indigenous women featured in Qiane Matata-Sipu's NUKU series and book.

== Honours ==
In the 2019 Queen's Birthday Honours, Brown-Acton was appointed a Member of the New Zealand Order of Merit, for services to the Pacific and LGBTQI+ communities. She is the first Pacific trans woman to be recognised in this way.

== Publications ==
- Brown-Acton, P. (2020). Hands and feet: A reflection on Polynesian navigation—a Niue Fakafifine community practitioner perspective in Aotearoa-New Zealand. Te Kaharoa, 15(1).
