= Human rights in the Cook Islands =

The Cook Islands are 15 small islands scattered over 2 million km squared of the South Pacific. According to the latest census, the nation has a total population of approximately 18,000 people. Spread in population between the mainland capital, Rarotonga, and the Outer Islands mean inequality in terms of delivery of public services. Internal migration between Rarotonga and the Outer Islands is relatively high due to lack of schooling and employment opportunities, and increased living standards and availability of medical and educational services in Rarotonga.

The Cook Islands are a state in free association with New Zealand since 1965, and has the power to legislate its own laws and enter into international human rights instruments of its own accord. The country has a Westminster parliamentary system that is democratically elected.

Rights are generally well respected, as provided for in the 1965 Constitution, but a number of issues still exist. These include the limitations that remain upon legislated rights and freedoms, political participation, women's rights, the rights of sexual minorities, and limits on freedom of religion.

== International human rights obligations ==
The Cook Islands is not a member state of the United Nations. Since 1988, treaties signed by the New Zealand Government do not extend to the Cook Islands unless expressly stated. Prior to this, New Zealand treaty action extended the application of the International Covenant on Civil and Political Rights (ICCPR) and its first Optional Protocol, the International Covenant on Economic, Social and Cultural Rights (ICESCR), and the Convention on the Elimination of All Forms of Racial Discrimination (CERD), to the Cook Islands. It is of note that the Cook Islands are yet to ratify in its own right seven of the nine core human rights treaties.

The two instruments to be ratified by the country since 1988 include the Convention on the Rights of the Child (CRC) in 1997, and the Convention on the Elimination of all Forms of Discrimination Against Women (CEDAW) in 2006. The Cook Islands has also ratified the Convention on the Rights of Persons with Disabilities, the 1949 Geneva Conventions, and the Rome Statute of the International Criminal Court (ICC).

== Constitutional protections ==
Fundamental civil and political rights are protected by the Constitution Act 1964, Part IV, introduced by the Constitution Amendment No. 9 in 1981. Rights protected include:

- Right to life, liberty and security of person (section 64(1)(a))
- Non-discrimination (section 64(1))
- Equality before the law (section 64(1)(b))
- Property rights (section 64(1)(c))
- Freedom of thought, conscience and religion (section 64(1)(d))
- Freedom of peaceful assembly and association (section 64(1)(f))
- Due process and fair trial (section 65)

Each of these rights is subject to limitations through section 64(2) of the Constitution Act by: any enactment or rule of law in force; for protecting the rights and freedoms of others or in the interests of public safety, order, or morals; the general welfare; or the security of the Cook Islands. To this extent the statutory protections are not absolute until the limitations described are removed.

== The Ombudsman Office ==
In November 2007, Cabinet appointed the Ombudsman to head the Cook Islands Human Rights Office. This has been interpreted to mean that Cabinet has issued a directive for the Ombudsman to set up a Human Rights Division within its portfolio.

Under the 2008 Cook Islands Disability Act, the Ombudsman's jurisdiction was further extended to investigate complaints of discrimination against the disabled. The Cook Islands is the first Pacific Island country to develop a rights-based disability policy and action plan.

== Capital punishment ==
The death penalty was not abolished until 2007, although it had never been utilised. Prior to reform, capital punishment only ever applied to the crime of treason, for which it was the automatic sentence.

== Political participation ==
Suffrage is universal to those above 18 years of age. Female parliamentary participation is present, but not equal. In 2009 there were three women in the 25 seat Parliament of the Cook Islands. There is at present one female Member of Parliament, Ngamau Munokoa, who was the first woman to hold the post of Cook Island's Deputy Prime Minister.

A relevant issue is the presence of the House of Ariki, a parliamentary body of Cook Islands high chiefs that are not elected, but appointed by the King's Representative. The group is supposed to only discuss those matters allocated to it by the democratically elected Parliament, and in reply it responds only with its opinions. A threat to democracy was posed in June 2008 during a coup claim by a small majority of the House of Ariki members, claiming to take control of the country's leadership. The claim passed fairly quickly and was a one-off incident.

In terms of chiefly participation within the House of Ariki, Christianity is credited with according women recognition as ariki (chiefs). Women are equally acknowledged as chiefs on Rarotonga, but less so in the Outer Islands.

== Women’s rights ==
Although the Cook Islands has ratified CEDAW, domestic violence against women remains at issue. There is no reliable data on the prevalence of domestic violence in the country, however anecdotal evidence does indicate it to be widespread, but largely going unreported The Crimes Act 1969, while providing for major sexual offences, does not include the full range of acts usually involved in domestic violence cases.

There exists a “no-drop” policy response to domestic violence arrests, meaning that police must proceed with the case notwithstanding the wishes of the victim. Victims who wish to have their case withdrawn must make their request to the court. Progress has been made through the Non-Governmental Organisation Women's Counselling Centre, Te Punanga Tauturu Incorporated, which delivers educational awareness programmes across the Islands.

== Sexual minorities ==
Lesbian and gay rights in the Cook Islands are a pressing issue. Civil unions for both males and females are not legally recognised. The only law against discrimination based upon sexual orientation is in section 10(g) of the Disability Act 2008, which prohibits discrimination against a person with a disability on the grounds of their sexual orientation.

== Freedom of religion ==
The Religious Organisations Restrictions Act of 1975 limits the introduction of new religions to the only four authorised in the Act. Approval must be granted from the Minister of Justice before another religion be established. Such a provision is in violation of the right to freedom of religion in Article 18 of the ICCPR.
