= Cleo Manago =

African-American activist (born 1960)

Cleo Manago (born September 21, 1960) is an African-American activist and social architect who coined the term same-gender loving (or SGL) as an alternative for African-descended or black people who do not wish to identify as gay or lesbian due to the perceived Eurocentric nature of the latter terminology and community practices. Along with his activism, he is also a blogger and columnist. Manago rejects the terms gay, bisexual and lesbian because he believes they are white, Eurocentric-constructed identities which do not culturally affirm the culture and history of African-descended people. Manago is also the founder and CEO of AmASSI Health and Cultural Centers and Black Men's Xchange (BMX).

== Early life and other activities ==
Manago is a native of south-central Los Angeles and began a vocation in social services when he was 16 years of age. He was once a professional musician (a bassist). He is a blogger and has written several articles, some of which have been published by Dogon Village. In 2011, he co-authored, produced, directed and starred in the educational documentary I AM A MAN: Black Manhood & Sexual Diversity.

Although usually referred to as a "social activist", Manago dislikes the term "activist" when applied to him. He believes black LGBTQ activism to be "tethered to mainstream white privilege, ideology, and single-focused gay organizations," which he views as culturally dissonant and too limited in scope to be meaningful and beneficial to African-American LGBTQ communities and the larger black community. It has been suggested that he originated the term "men who have sex with men" (MSM).

== AmASSI Health and Cultural Centers ==
A.m.A.S.S.I. or AmASSI (The African, American Advocacy, Support-Services & Survival Institute) was founded in 1989 by Manago. It aims to end "health disparities, self-concept and inter-group conflict among diverse people of African descent." Since its foundation in 1989, it has become one of the replicated organizations in the United States, making Manago an early provider of the AIDS movement of culturally specific HIV/AIDS treatment and prevention services for African-Americans using a psychosocial, mental health model.

== Black Men's Xchange (BMX) ==
Founded in 1989, the Black Men's Xchange (BMX) is the oldest and largest community-based movement in the U.S. devoted to promoting healthy self-concept and behavior, cultural affirmation, and critical consciousness among SGL, gay-identified and bisexual African-descended males and their allies.

This organization has chapters in Los Angeles, Oakland, San Francisco, Sacramento, Orange County, Detroit, Denver, Atlanta, Minneapolis, Baltimore, and Philadelphia. It has been funded by "the Center for Disease Control's Act Against AIDS Leadership Initiative program. And the CDC positions BMX alongside other legacy community black organization[s] such as the NAACP, the Urban League, the Congressional Black Caucus Foundation, and American Urban Radio Networks."

== Criticism and response ==
Among certain members of the LGBT community, Manago is regarded as "homo demagogue," contrarian, separatist, and anti-white. However, some among the same-gender-loving (SGL), bisexual, transgender, and liberal heterosexual African-American community view him as a visionary and "social architect" advocating for a group of people marginalized by the white LGBTQ community.

Manago view terms such as "gay" and "lesbian" as vestiges of white Eurocentric dominance, and defined "gay" as "the mainstream white (patriarchal) homosexual community".

According to Manago, "In the midst of a need for affirmation and acknowledgment from the 'gay' community, same-gender-loving Black people are subject to sexual objectification, discrimination, white supremacist treatment and indifference." The SGL movement also objects to the pink triangle, the rainbow flag and the lambda symbol, which they view as symbols of white gayness, "none of which is African- or black-identified."
