= Binabinaaine =

Tuvaluan gender

- Classification: Gender identity

Other terms
- Synonyms: Pinapinaaine
- Associated terms: Fakaleiti, Two-spirit, Trans woman, Akava'ine, Māhū

Demographics
- Culture: Gilbertese and Tuvaluan
Regions with significant populations
- Micronesia and Polynesia

Binabinaaine or sometimes called Pinapinaaine are people who identify as a third gender that is not male nor female. In Kiribati, this term is broad and can refer to gay men, bisexual men, and transgender women. Their sex is assigned male at birth but they are seen to have female or more feminine characteristics. The word means “becoming a woman” in Gilbertese. They come from the Gilbert and Ellice Islands in Kiribati and Tuvalu. The term is flexible and can be used as a noun, verb or adverb. There are multiple terms in the surrounding area for a third gender that is more feminine presenting in the region. Oceania has a large and rich history of peoples being born male but not fulfilling traditionally male or masculine roles. These people are well known and documented throughout the many islands of the pacific ocean. Notably the Binabinaaine can be compared to the faʻafafine in Samoa and the māhū and raerae in French Polynesia. Typically, this sort of third gender role is assigned later in life. Children are typically assigned male in this case and then later grow up to inherit more feminine traits and roles. This sort of gender assignment is different from the transgender identity that is more commonly recognized in North America and Europe. Although the Binabinaaine, Fa’afafine, and māhū are all assigned male at birth and then later take on feminine roles and present themselves in a feminine manner, they think of themselves as distinctly not women. They believe themselves to not act as men or women but as a third gender distinct from male and female.

Binabinaaine or pinapinaaine (with the meaning of "becoming a woman" in Gilbertese) are people who identify themselves as having a third-gender role in Kiribati and Tuvalu, and previously in the Gilbert and Ellice Islands which reunited the two archipelagoes. These are people whose sex is assigned male at birth, but who embody female gendered behaviours.

The term comes from Gilbertese and has been loaned into Tuvaluan; it can be used as a noun, a verb or an adverb. The more rarely used term in Tuvaluan is fakafafine. There are similarities between the societal roles that binabinaaine share with other gender liminal communities from the Pacific, including the Samoan fa'afafine and the Tongan fakaleiti.

According to anthropologist Gilbert Herdt, some Tuvaluans view binabinaaine as a "borrowing" from Kiribati whence other "'undesirable' traits of Tuvaluan culture, like sorcery, are thought to have originated", but those ideas are mainly spread by Protestant churches as Church of Tuvalu originated from Samoa, where the equivalent of binabinaaine also exists.

== History ==
=== Background ===
The binabinaaine (also known as pinapinaaine) is a gender identity as well as a social role that is widely recognized in the Gilbert Islands (nowadays part of Kiribati) and in Tuvalu. The term "binabinaaine" in Gilbertese can translate roughly as "becoming a woman", which represents a widely local recognition for individuals who were born/assigned as male at birth, yet adopted traits and feminine gender expressions, mannerisms, and at times gendered social responsibilities. Despite acknowledging the existence of a third gender, within these Micronesian and Polynesian societies, it represents a culturally specific role different from Western notions of transgender or homosexual identities.

The presence of third-gender roles in Kiribati and Tuvalu parallels other Oceanic traditions, such as the fa'afafine in Samoa and the fakaleiti in Tonga. Historical and ethnographic sources depicted binabinaaine individuals as active participants in communal and ceremonial life, engaging in dance, oratory, and performance. They primarily served as entertainers and social commentators. Ethnographic accounts also describe binabinaaine as active participants in the community, who participated in everyday and social activities alongside other women, including domestic and social labor, highlighting the relevance of their role within Tuvaluan culture.

=== Cultural significance and gender concepts ===
From an anthropological standpoint, the binabinaaine's role is considered a culturally constructed expression of gender rather than a reflection of fixed biological categories. Their existence demonstrates that concepts of gender and sexuality are locally produced through local cosmologies, ritual practices, and kinship relations. Their continuation is a clear illustration that gender diversity has long been presented outside of the non-Western societies, independent of modern LGBTQ+ terminologies and frameworks.

=== Colonial and missionary influence ===
Throughout the course of history, the binabinaaine role has been influenced by a combination of colonial, religious, and global influences. These external forces often disrupted/forbade the local cultural practices. During the nineteenth and twentieth centuries, Christian missionaries, upon their arrival, had imposed a moral framework that condemned gender diversity, characterizing such behaviors as sinful, contrary to "natural" social order. The presence of foreigners had contributed to a gradual transformation of local attitudes regarding these gender expressions, especially as mission schools and churches were integrated and became the central institutions in Kiribati and Tuvaluan communities. Within their own tribe, some Tuvaluan Protestants also regarded the binabinaaine as a custom that is linked with sorcery or obnoxious behavior, which demonstrated the colonial influence on native anxiety toward gender and sexuality. Despite those hardships, the indigenous people still embrace this practice; the role did not disappear; instead, it persisted within village life and adapted to new social environments, including increased internal migration, wage-based economies, and exposure to global media.

=== Contemporary context ===
In modern Kiribati and Tuvalu, binabinaaine individuals remain a part of their society but face social ambivalence. While still being recognized and praised during important cultural events or pageants, yet, they are also experiencing stigma and discrimination due to religious conservatism. Legitimately, Kiribati has forbidden male same-sex relations, as this was a colonial-era law that has never been lifted, though it is not strictly enforced. These tensions also represent the complex social position of the binabinaaine - both culturally valued and socially marginalized. Their continued presence offers an important case study of third-gender systems in Oceania, demonstrating how culturally specific identities reflect and sustain social order through gender expression.

== Community ==
=== Traditional roles ===
Within the binabinaaine community many individuals assumes domestic and caregiving roles traditionally held by women in their community. Within their families, binabinaaine serve as helpers, performing tasks such as cooking, cleaning, and washing clothes. Some are recognized for their talent in entertaining the community, particularly through their contemporary Pacific Island dances. There are also binabinaaine who act as breadwinners for their community, with many working within the country's public and private sectors. Similar to the fa'afafine of the Samoan community, binabinaine assist with childcare and eldercare, providing alloparental support usually handled by daughters or sisters fulfilling whatever role is needed within their community.

=== Kinship ===
Anthropologist Gilbert Herdt highlighted that binabinaaine, along with other third gender groups, holds specific and distinct societal roles. This distinction allows for unique roles and privileges for binabinaaine within their communities. Their contemporary dances and performances are known to incorporate social commentary that reflects the delegative role of binabinaaine hold within their community. They also hold a unique position within the community that allows them to openly comment on the appearance of Gilbertese and Tuvaluan men and/or their behavior, fulfilling a role of community commentators. It is also common to see binabinaaine form strong lasting friendships with women within their community. In Funafuti, it has been observed that younger women have a higher tendency to develop close bonds with older pinapinaaine. These relationships often originate from younger women seeking guidance in traditionally female skills such as weaving and dancing. The mentor-like or deep friendship dynamic often results in binabinaaine being closely acquainted with women’s circles in their community.

Traditionally, the third gender role, was accepted as part of the community in the same manor as Hijras were revered within Indian communities pre-colonization. However, societal perceptions the third gender roles shifted with western and Christian influences, altering the perception of binabinaaine as a whole. Though binabinaaine are still generally accepted by the wider population, and are not even seen as immoral by the wider population, they can even legally marry and adopt children, though such cases are rare.

=== Activism ===
Binabinaine support has been observed beyond their community, in 2016 gay men, bisexual men and transgender women founded the first LGBTQI+ organization within their country of Kiribati. The group Boutokaan Inaomataia ao Mauriia Binabinaine Association (BIMBA), when roughly translated it refers to an association that safeguards human rights and the health of binabinaine. Centered around the protection against discrimination baised on Sexual Orientation, Gender Identity and Expression, and Sex Characteristics + (SOGIESC) individuals.
