= Te Tiare Association =

Human rights organisation

- Te Tiare Association
- Formation: 2007
- Purpose: Activism
- Location: Cook Islands
- Website: http://www.tetiareassociation.com/

The Te Tiare Association (TTA) is the LGBTQI++ advocacy organisation in the Cook Islands. It works to celebrate the country's 'akava'ine, ꞌakatututāne and LGBT communities.

== Background ==
The Te Tiare Association Inc. (TTA) was formally incorporated on 30 November 2007 at the Rarotonga High Court. It is an organisation established to bring together 'akava'ine in the Cook Islands for education and advocacy purposes. On 21 June 2008 the Te Tiare Association was officially launched as part of a partnership with the Pacific Islands Aids Foundation. It is the first LGBTQI++ advisory group in the Cook Islands.

== Campaigns ==
From its inception the TTA has promoted sexual health awareness, the prevention of sexually transmitted infections and the prevention of HIV. Community building has also been an important aspect of its purpose, since some members of its communities are estranged from their families due to their identities and sexualities.

The TTA campaigns for the repeal of discriminatory laws in the Cook Islands which make homosexuality illegal. In order to counter the current legal situation the TTA is using Section 64 of the Cook Islands Constitution, which protects people from discrimination. TTA launched the Pride Cook Islands Campaign on the 27th of November 2019.

Activist Sonya Apa Temata organised a petition in 2020, which gathered over 5000 signatures of people for were in favour of a repeal of the laws against homosexuality.

Louisa Wall MP has been vocal in support of the TTA's work, stating that the Cook Islands homophobic laws are a direct inheritance of British colonialism. In 2020 Cook Islander Alex Nicholls married his husband, Joshua Nicholls, in Sydney, Australia due to the criminalisation of homosexuality in the Cook Islands.

In 2019 the TTA led a campaign which challenged a ban on the screening of the Elton John biopic Rocketman, which was due to be imposed by the Chief Censor. The TTA successfully argued that a ban was unconstitutional.

== Culture ==
The Te Tiare Association organised the Cook Islands inaugural Pride Day in 2020, however the event was cancelled due to COVID-19. The TTA dance troupe performed in 2021 at the Cook Islands Business and Professional Women's Association's (BPW) International Women's Day event.

== Notable people ==
- Tuaine, Lady Marsters (patron)
- Valery Wichman (former president)
- Regina Potina (former president)
