= Maurice Scott (politician) =

Fijian lawyer and politician (1910–1976)

Speaker of the Legislative Council
- In office 1958–1966
- Preceded by: Lala Sukuna
- Succeeded by: Ronald Kermode

Member of the Legislative Council
- In office 1947–1958
- Preceded by: Hugh Ragg
- Succeeded by: Ronald Kermode
- Constituency: Northern and Western (European)

Personal details
- Born: 23 July 1910
- Died: 5 June 1976 (aged 65)

Sir Henry Maurice Scott CBE DFC (23 July 1910 – 5 June 1976) was a Fijian lawyer and politician. He was a member of the Legislative Council between 1947 and 1966, serving as Speaker between 1958 and 1966.

== Biography ==
Born in 1910, Scott was the son of Nellie and Henry Milne Scott, one of Fiji's most prominent lawyers and politicians. After being educated at Whanganui Collegiate School in New Zealand and attending Magdalen College at the University of Oxford, he was called to the bar at Gray's Inn in 1936. The following year he set up his own law firm in Suva, before joining the family firm Wm. Scott & Co in 1939. During World War II he served in the Fijian Military Forces and No. 208 Squadron of the Royal Air Force. He flew Spitfire fighters with the Desert Air Force, serving in Iraq, Italy, Palestine and the Western Desert and won the Distinguished Flying Cross.

When he returned to Fiji after the war, he rejoined his family's legal firm in 1947. He also served on the board and as chairman of several companies, including Burns Philp and the Fiji Times, as well as becoming president of the Fiji Rugby Union, a role he held for 21 years. He contested the 1947 elections to the Legislative Council, winning the European Northern and Western seat. He was re-elected unopposed in 1950, 1953 and 1956 and was awarded a CBE in the 1957 Birthday Honours. In 1958 he was appointed Speaker of the Council. He remained Speaker until 1966, and was knighted in the 1966 Birthday Honours.

Following a previous marriage that produced two children, Scott married Fenna Gatty, the widow of Harold Gatty. His son John later served as head of the Fijian Red Cross. He died in June 1976 and was buried at Navualoa.
