= Tonga Leitis' Association =

LGBT rights organization in Tonga

- Tonga Leitis Association
- Formation: 1992
- Founder: Joey Joleen Mataele
- Website: https://tongaleiti.org/Web

The Tonga Leitis' Association (TLA) is an advocacy and education organisation in Tonga, and is the only organisation in the country dedicated to LGBTQ+ issues.

== Background ==
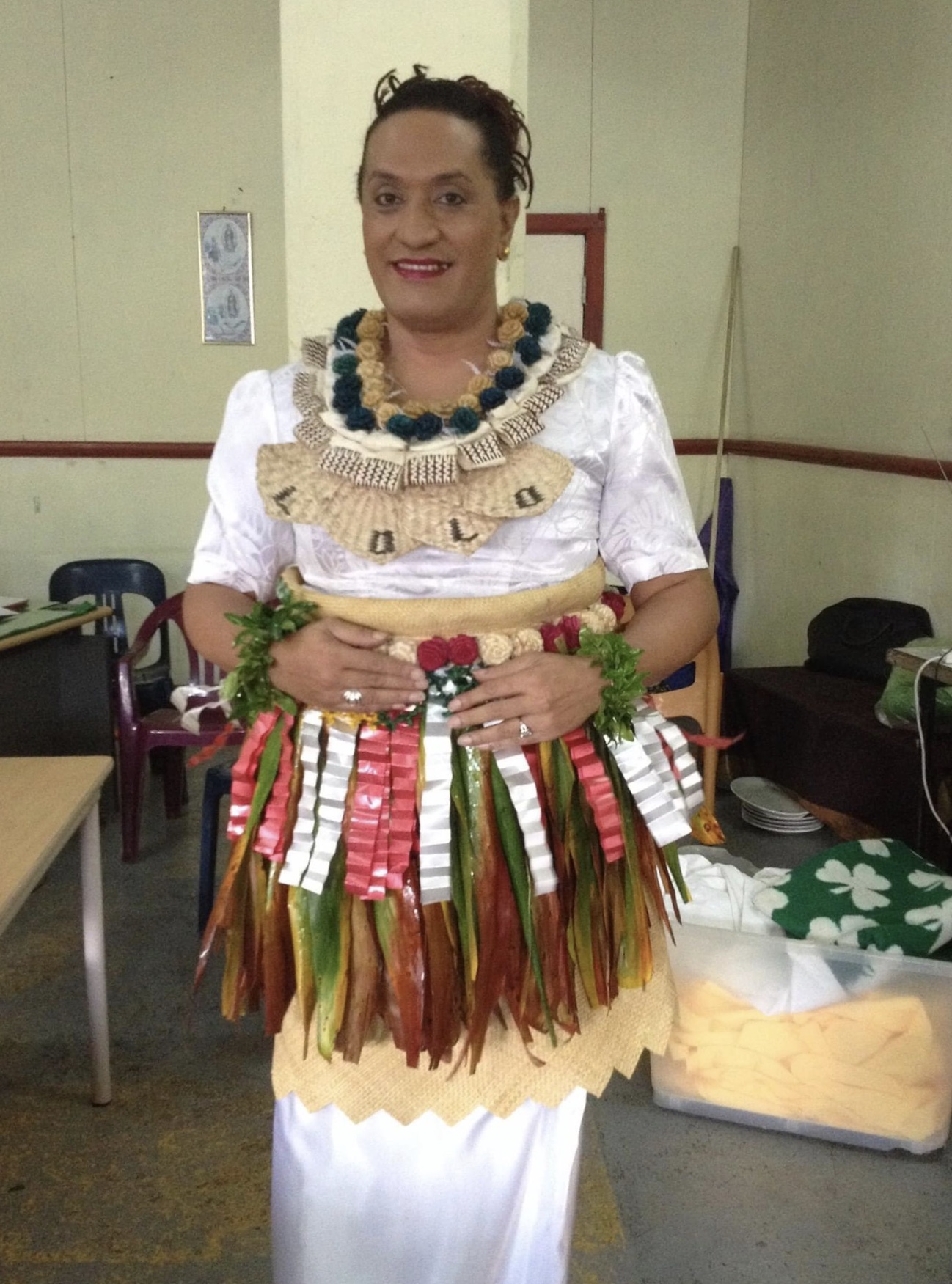
Joey Joleen Mataele in traditional dress

The Tonga Leitis Association (TLA) was founded in 1992 by Joey Joleen Mataele. Its first president was Papiloa Foliaki. It was initially founded in order to support Tonga's historic fakaleiti community. It is a member of the Asia Pacific Transgender Network (APTN). It is the sole LGBTQ+ rights organisation in Tonga. In 2021 its president, Polikalepo Kefu, was murdered.

== Campaigns ==
In 2016 the association campaigned for greater legal protections for LGBTQ+ Tongans; in Tonga sodomy and transvestism are punishable by up to ten years in prison. Tonga's current homophobic attitudes are a product of British colonialism, despite the fact that Tonga has a rich history of transgender people, especially women, known as fakaleiti.

=== Community provision ===
The TLA runs a community centre and safehouse, which provides a safe space for the community to use, as well as raising awareness on LGBTQ+ issues. The association runs a safe house, called ‘Ofa he Paea’, for members of the LGBTQ+ community in Tonga who have been forced away from their homes by homophobia and transphobia. The centre was opened in 2013 by HRH Salote Mafile’o Pilolevu Tuita; it was named by her daughter the Hon. Salote Lupepau’u Tuita. It was damaged by Cyclone Gita in 2018 and had to be rebuilt. The centre is the first of its kind in the Pacific.

=== HIV/AIDS ===
This first AIDS patient in Tonga was diagnosed in 1979 and they were a member of Tonga's fakaleiti community. As of 2020, the TLA held quarterly HIV testing events across the whole country.

=== Climate crisis ===
In 2021 the TLA was awarded a grant by the UK-based charity GiveOut, in order to establish a training programme for those who run emergency shelters, to raise awareness of specific needs members of the LGBTQ+ community. It also campaigns for LGBTQ+ representatives in discussions about climate change.

== Culture ==
The TLA runs the Miss Galaxy Pageant beauty pageant, which raises awareness of LGBTQ+ issues in Tonga and has become a popular event. It has been closely involved with the HIV crisis in Tonga, advocating for better healthcare provision by the Tongan government.

In 2018 the TLA collaborated on a one-hour documentary called Leitis in Waiting. It was screened at the Nuku'alofa Film Festival. Its premier was at the Festival of Commonwealth Film in London.

In October 2021 association president Taufu’i ‘Ae Valu Naufahu was awarded a Commonwealth Points of Light award for his exceptional voluntary service supporting the LGBTQI community.
