= John Maurice Scott =

Fijian Red Cross director

John Scott
- Born: 1948; Suva, Colony of Fiji, British Empire
- Died: 1 July 2001 (aged 52–53); Suva, Fiji
- Occupations: Director General, Fiji Red Cross

John Maurice Scott (1948 – 1 July 2001) was the Director General of the Fiji Red Cross and received a Red Cross award for his role in the hostage crisis during the 2000 Fijian coup d'état.

== Biography ==
Scott was born in Suva, Fiji, and educated in Fiji and New Zealand. He held a number of prominent public positions for various national, regional and international councils and programmes. He was a fourth generation European Fijian and his father, Sir Maurice Scott was the first European Speaker in the Parliament of Fiji.

Scott joined the Red Cross in 1994 and played a key mediation role after George Speight seized parliament on 19 May 2000 and took Prime Minister Mahendra Chaudhry and his government hostage for 56 days. Scott was initially the only outsider allowed to see the hostages and eventually oversaw their release. He declined to testify in Speight's trial because he did not want to compromise the neutrality of the Red Cross.

Scott was involved in trying to restore Fiji's overthrown 1997 constitution and was among the members of the gay community that put forward submissions to keep the constitution because it protected LGBT (lesbian, gay, bisexual, transgender) rights.

Scott was murdered on 1 July 2001 in Suva along with his partner, Gregory Scrivener, in an apparent homophobic attack with a possible political motive.

Scott's story became the subject of a New Zealand documentary, An Island Calling. which is based on the book Deep Beyond The Reef, written by his brother Owen Scott.
