= Simione Foliaki =

Tongan rugby league footballer

Personal information
- Born: 10 March 1984 (age 42) Tonga

Playing information
- Position: Fullback
Representative
Years	Team	Pld	T	G	FG	P
2006	Tonga	3				0

Simione Foliaki (born 10 March 1981 in Tonga) is a Tongan rugby league footballer who plays as a fullback for the Vaini Doves in the Tonga National Rugby League competition.

Foliaki has also appeared on several occasions for the Tonga national rugby league team. His most recent international games came during the 2006 Federation Shield competition; in one of these, a losing game against England, he was sent off, .
