= Shaneel Lal =

Activist based in New Zealand

- Born: 22 January 2000 (age 26); Nausori, Fiji
- Occupations: Activist; columnist; political commentator
- Known for: Activism
- Awards: Kiwibank Young New Zealander of the Year 2023

Shaneel Shavneel Lal (born 22 January 2000) is a Fijian-New Zealand LGBT rights activist, columnist and political commentator. Lal is best known for advocating for the ban of conversion therapy in New Zealand.

== Early life ==
Lal was born in Nausori, Fiji, to a mixed iTaukei and Girmitiya family on 22 January 2000. Lal comes from a Hindu family and was raised in a Hindu and Muslim community. After attending a Christian primary and high school in Fiji, Lal states that they "grew out of" religion and subscribes to indigenous spirituality.

In Fiji, Lal was put into conversion therapy in an attempt to change their sexuality and gender identity. The elders of the village prayed over Lal to free them of spirits that supposedly made Lal queer. Lal experienced conversion therapy as a challenge to their indigeneity and relationships with their ancestors. Lal argues that precolonial indigenous queerness is distinct from colonial attitudes to and terms for queerness. Lal argues that prior to colonisation, vakasalewalewa were integral to native Fijian society, and that colonisation and Christianity stripped Fijians of their rich queer identities and conditioned them with homophobia and transphobia.

In 2014, Lal moved to New Zealand with their family. Lal joined Otahuhu College and was named dux in 2018.

Lal uses they/them pronouns and has described themself as trans, non-binary, vakasalewalewa and hijra.

== Advocacy and career ==
=== Role in banning conversion therapy ===
In the summer of 2017, Lal was volunteering at Middlemore Hospital when a church leader walked up to them and offered to pray their gay away. When Lal refused, the church leader wished hell upon them.

Lal's speech at the 2019 Youth Parliament to ban conversion therapy received a standing ovation. Following this, Lal was targeted online with homophobic abuse. In an interview with Breakfast in 2020, Lal labelled conversion therapy "state sanctioned torture". Lal told interviewer Jenny-May Clarkson that numerous queer people pray to God to "heal them, or kill them". Following this interview, Massey University lecturer Steve Elers wrote an opinion piece for the Manawatu Guardian, republished by The New Zealand Herald, dismissing the issue of conversion therapy. David Farrier defended Lal in his blog Webworm, and the subsequent media attention led to Elers's opinion column being cancelled.

Lal founded the Conversion Therapy Action Group in 2019 to work towards ending conversion therapy in New Zealand. During the 2020 New Zealand general election, Lal and CTAG pressured the New Zealand Labour Party to commit to banning conversion therapy in New Zealand. Lal worked with the Green Party of Aotearoa New Zealand to deliver a petition of over more than 150,000 signatures to ban conversion therapy.

In July, the Minister of Justice, Kris Faafoi, introduced the Conversion Practices Prohibition Legislation Bill. Lal criticised the Bill, calling it an "inadequate bill that fails to ban the practice or compensate the victims". Lal argued that the Conversion Practices Prohibition Legislation Bill would not allow the police to prosecute offenders and would allow conversion therapy to continue. The Justice Select Committee hearing submissions on the Conversion Practices Prohibition Legislation Bill received over 100,000 submissions following Lal's online campaign, breaking the record for the number of submissions.

In February 2021, the Minister of Justice announced that a ban on conversion therapy would be enacted at the end of 2021 or in February 2022, at the latest. Lal claimed that this was "an astounding commitment" because at that point, Labour had not done foundational work towards their goal. Leading up to the second reading of the Bill, Lal launched a petition asking the Labour Party to amend the Bill through Supplementary Order Papers at the Committee of the whole House. Lal argued that the Labour Party ignored the voices of queer people and put forward an inadequate and ineffective Bill after the select committee process. The petition asked the Government to remove the 18-year age limit to include all ages, to remove the provision that the Attorney-General needed to give consent for prosecutions and to provide ACC coverage for the harm caused by conversion therapy. The Labour Party did not accept any recommendations.

The Conversion Practices Prohibition Legislation Bill passed at third reading on 15 February 2022. Lal stated that it was "disheartening" that the bill only protected children (because people over 18 would have to prove they suffered "serious harm" under a strict legal definition) and did not include Accident Compensation Corporation (ACC) coverage for mental harm. Nonetheless, Lal said that New Zealand's ban on conversion therapy is a win for humanity, not just the queer community, and asserted that queer rights are human rights.

Lal stated that they received a death threat after the passing of the Conversion Practices Prohibition Legislation Bill. Lal dismissed the threats and instead called for celebration. Lal told VICE World News that the ban on conversion therapy is a gift to future generations of queer people.

In 2022, Vogue magazine published an online article in celebration of Lal's efforts to ban conversion therapy in New Zealand. Vogue wrote that "Lal's call for New Zealand to reform the laws around conversion therapy have made a major impact".

=== Investigation into Bethlehem College ===
In 2022, Lal shared an article to their Instagram detailing how Bethlehem College in Tauranga requires all students and their families to demonstrate a commitment to the belief that marriage is only between a man and a woman. Former and present students responded to the Instagram post, accusing the school of abuse. Lal said the students made allegations including victim blaming of people who alleged they were raped, racism and blackface incidents, and conversion therapy practices. Lal started a petition calling for the Education Review Office to launch an independent investigation into Bethlehem College and for the Ministry of Education, the Minister of Education and the Associate Ministers of Education to support the investigation. Lal said that when they "posted about the issue of homophobia at Bethlehem College, I did not realise the gravity of the abuse the former and present students have been experiencing at Bethlehem College."

=== Advocacy to lift the "gay blood donation" ban ===
Since May 2022, Lal has argued that the New Zealand Blood Service should allow gay men in monogamous relationships, who have had sex only with each other in the last three months, to donate blood. Researchers estimate that about thirty-five thousand people would be able to give blood if New Zealand Blood Service took this approach. Lal says the blanket ban on gay blood donation rules out people who could safely donate blood but who are not allowed to because they are gay. In October 2022, Lal argued that anyone who had not had a new sexual partner and anal sex, or who had not had multiple sexual partners and anal sex within the last three months, should be allowed to donate blood if they carry no infections.

In February 2023, Lal advocated for New Zealand Blood Service and Medsafe to use individualised donor behaviour criteria to determine eligibility of blood donors. Lal wanted the question to be "have you had sex with more than one person, or a new person, in the last three months?” instead of asking questions about a donor's sexuality. Lal claimed that if the "stars align", the Sex and Prevention of Transmission Study "will provide [New Zealand Blood Service] with the necessary scientific evidence to make a proposal to Medsafe to utilise an individualised risk assessment for gay men wanting to donate blood". In May 2023, Lal said that New Zealand Blood Services had sufficient international evidence demonstrating it was safe to use individualised risk assessment to determine donor eligibility. Lal believes that the blanket ban on gay men giving blood should be removed.

=== Other advocacy ===
In 2022, Lal launched a petition calling the Labour Party to protect queer people, women and disabled people from hate speech. The petition gained over 10,000 signatures. Lal wrote in their New Zealand Herald column that "the Labour Party's failure to prohibit anti-queer hate speech will embolden anti-queer groups, extremist religious groups, and right-wing groups to incite violence against queer people."

Following a 2022 arson attack on RainbowYOUTH's Tauranga Drop-In Centre, Lal set up a Givealittle campaign which raised $84,000.

Lal is calling on the Pacific Islands to decriminalise homosexuality. Following a 2021 Green Party event celebrating 35 Years of Homosexual Law Reform, Lal criticised the lack of action by New Zealand's Pākehā queer community to support the decriminalisation of homosexuality in the Pacific Islands and addressed the racism in the New Zealand queer community. A petition called on Rainbow Youth to expel them from Rainbow Youth's board. Pasifika communities have celebrated Lal for their advocacy for queer Pasifika voices and issues. The Coconet wrote that "Shaneel Lal is a multifaceted and intersectional activist. They have been vocal and influential in bringing to light various issues around racism, transphobia, indigenous land issues, systemic injustice and much more.

At the 2021 Auckland Pride March, Lal confronted anti-queer Christian protestors.

In 2023, Lal helped organise a counter-protest of a women's rights rally organised by the British anti-transgender activist Kellie-Jay Keen-Minshull in Auckland. Keen-Minshull was escorted out of Albert Park after she was assaulted by a protestor, and cancelled her other rally in New Zealand.

=== Other work ===
Lal advised the Minister of Education, Chris Hipkins for three years as a member of the Minister's youth advisory group. Lal has sat on Amnesty International's Youth Task Force. Lal has served as a Global Youth Leader for Open Government Partnership. In 2019, Lal was selected by Jenny Salesa to represent Manukau East in the New Zealand Youth Parliament.

In 2020, Lal was a finalist for Mr Gay New Zealand, a competition run by Express Magazine.

In November 2025, Lal was nominated for Labour Party preselection in Wellington North at the 2026 New Zealand general election. They were unsuccessful, with Ayesha Verrall being selected as the Labour candidate.

== Awards and recognition ==
- 2020: 1News named Lal a young leader that inspired New Zealand.
- 2021: Impact Award for Inclusion for their work to end conversion therapy in New Zealand. A special award by the Pacific Cooperation Foundation for Inclusion, namely their work for equality for queer Pacific peoples. Lal featured on the cover of New Zealand Herald VIVA magazine for the 2021 People of Year edition, which featured non-conformists who helped define 2021. Lal was featured in a VICE world documentary called The New Resistance, which covered young activists around the world creating transformative change.
- 2022: Vogue magazine featured Lal in Youthquake, an edition celebrating Gen-Z creators. Lal was listed in the Forbes 30 Under 30 Asia Class of 2022 for their work to ban conversion therapy in New Zealand.
- On 30 March 2023, Lal was named Young New Zealander of the Year. They are the first transgender recipient of any New Zealander of the Year Awards.
