= Sonya Apa Temata =

Human rights activist

- Born: New Zealand
- Occupations: Nurse; activist
- Known for: Campaigning for the decriminalisation of homosexuality in the Cook Islands

Sonya Apa Temata is a takataapui human rights activist and nurse of Cook Islander, Māori, and Tahitian descent. She specialises in advocacy for the LGBTQ community in Oceania. She has spoken out about how the criminalisation of gay men is a legacy of Christian missionaries and British colonialism in the Pacific. Temata helped organize the participation of Pasifika people in the pride parades in New Zealand.

In 2019, Temata organised a petition in support of the decriminalisation of homosexuality in the Cooks Islands, which was presented by the Te Tiare Association to the Government of the Cook Islands, who were considering repealing the law. The petition had come about because the Parliament of the Cook Islands had decided to remove a clause from the 1969 Crimes Act that prohibited "indecent acts between men" two years earlier, but public outcry from some community members had brought a committee to reinstate the clause. On April 14, 2023, the Cook Islands voted to remove the clause.

Temata is a former board member of Auckland Pride.

== Awards ==
- Winner - Pacific Health Volunteer Individual Awards (2018)
