= Polikalepo Kefu =

Tongan human rights activist (1980–2021)

- Born: c. 1980
- Died: 2021

Polikalepo "Poli" Kefu (c. 1980–2021) was a Tongan human rights activist who served as president of the Tonga Leitis' Association prior to his murder in 2021.

== Biography ==
=== Activism ===
Kefu was active in LGBTQ activism both in Tonga and in the wider Pacific region.

In 2011, Kefu served as the Tonga representative for Moving Planet, an environmental association, and in 2012 he led an event for 350 Pacific. In 2012, Kefu was a delegate at the New Zealand Parliamentarians' Group on Population and Development in Wellington.

In 2016, Kefu, alongside other members of the Tonga Leitis' Association, led a national consultation with Tongan leaders aimed at creating more legal protections for LGBTQ people in Tonga. In 2018, Kefu was elected president of the Tonga Leitis' Association, a non-governmental organisation advocating for Tonga's LGBTQ population, in addition providing support services and education on HIV and AIDS. He held the role until his death.

In addition to his role with the Tonga Leitis' Association, Kefu also acted as chairman of the Pacific Protection Gender Inclusion Network, and as communications officer for the Tonga Red Cross Society. In February 2021, Kefu coordinated the Tongan hub of International Lesbian, Gay, Bisexual, Trans and Intersex Association's Human Rights and Law Reform Virtual Symposium in Suva, Fiji.

=== Personal life ===
Kefu was gender-nonconforming from a young age, and was "abused by his brothers for the way he dressed and his voice".

At the time of Kefu's death, he lived in the village Lapaha near Muʻa on the island of Tongatapu.

=== Murder ===
On 1 May 2021, Kefu's body was found on a beach in the village of Tatakamotonga, close to his home in Lapaha. Later that day, a 27-year-old man was arrested; on 3 May 2021 Tevita Vailea, the deputy commissioner of Tonga Police, confirmed that the man had been charged with murder. The police declined to comment on speculation that Kefu's death constituted a hate crime.

On 6 May 2021, a vigil was held for Kefu at the basilica in Nukuʻalofa led by Cardinal Soane Patita Paini Mafi. The social media campaign "#JusticeForPoli" called for urgent law reform, including the repeal of Tonga's Criminal Offences Act, which criminalised sodomy.

On 19 May 2021, ʻInoke Silong Filivaolelei Tonga appeared before magistrates charged with murder. On 2 September he pleaded guilty, and on 11 October he was given a life sentence for Kefu's murder by Tonga's Lord Chief Justice, Michael Hargreaves Whitten, at the Nufuʻalofa Supreme Court.

== Legacy ==
The Tonga Leitis' Association released a statement following Kefu's death describing him as "a selfless humanitarian and a tireless advocate for the rights of those with diverse sexual orientations, gender identities and gender expressions". The Women and Children's Crisis Centre, a Tongan human rights organisation, said that Kefu's death had left a "huge hole" in the Tongan human rights movement.

Princess Frederica Tuita, a member of the Tongan royal family, said "we are absolutely devastated to hear of dear Poli's passing". Amini Fonua, an openly gay Olympic swimmer from Tonga, described Kefu as "a beacon of light" and "a fighter for all the voiceless LGBTQ people, not just in Tonga, but throughout the Pacific".

The Pacific Protection Gender Inclusion Network praised Kefu as a "passionate, critical, kick-ass, funny and diehard human rights activist". ILGA Oceania called Kefu "a humble, gentle, inspiring leader".

UN AIDS Pacific praised Kefu's contributions as an activist for Leitis as well as to the HIV response in Tonga and the wider Pacific region. The Asia Pacific Transgender Network mourned the loss of "a devoted individual, warm-hearted friend, a brave warrior, and a fearless leader".
