= Same gender loving =

Term for African American homosexuals and bisexuals

Same gender loving, or SGL, a term coined for African American and African diaspora use by activist Cleo Manago, is a description for homosexuals in the African American community. It emerged in the early 1990s as a culturally affirming African American homosexual identity.

SGL was adapted as an Afrocentric alternative to what are deemed Eurocentric homosexual identities (e.g. gay and lesbian) which do not culturally affirm or engage the history and cultures of people of African descent. The term SGL usually has broad, important and positive personal, social, and political purposes and consequences. SGL has been described as "an anti-hate and anti-anti-Black identity [...] movement, philosophy and framework".

In a 2004 study of African American men, most of whom were recruited from black gay organizations, 12% identified as same-gender-loving, while 53% identified as gay. Men attending Black Gay Pride Festivals in nine U.S. cities in 2000 responded similarly, with 10% identifying as same-gender-loving, 66% as gay, and 14% as bisexual. Studies in the 1990s indicated that African-American disadvantaged youths were less likely than Euro-American youths to self-label as gay male, lesbian, or transgender youths.

== See also ==
- African-American culture and sexual orientation
- Same-gender attraction
