= Papiloa Foliaki =

Tongan former politician

Papiloa Foliaki (born 1935) is a Tongan former politician. She initially worked as a nurse, headed a nurses' union, and "led Tonga's first ever strike". She then went into business, as owner and operator of the Friendly Islander Hotel. In 1978, she was elected as a People's Representative to the Legislative Assembly of Tonga – the second woman ever (and first commoner woman) to sit in the Tongan Parliament, after Princess Si'uilikutapu (1975–78). Foliaki served until 1981. She co-founded the Tonga Leitis' Association, the only organisation in Tonga dedicated to LGBT rights.
