= Kalisito Biaukula =

Human rights activist

Kalisito Biaukula is a Fijian human rights activist, who is vakasalewalewa. In 2019 they attended the Youth Assembly of International Civil Society Week. In 2022 they were part of a consultation effort organised by United Nations Development Programme (UNDP), in advance of the Stockholm 50 conference. They have worked for Youth Voices Count, a non-governmental organisation for LGBTQ+ youth who work to address human rights issues. They have also been outspoken on how, in some Fijian homes, conversion therapy is aligned with physical violence and domestic abuse.

== Selected publications ==
- Chandra-Mouli, Venkatraman, et al. "The political, research, programmatic, and social responses to adolescent sexual and reproductive health and rights in the 25 years since the International Conference on Population and Development." Journal of Adolescent Health 65.6 (2019): S16-S40.
- Plesons, M., Cole, C. B., Hainsworth, G., Avila, R., Biaukula, K. V. E., Husain, S., ... & Chandra-Mouli, V. (2019). Forward, together: a collaborative path to comprehensive adolescent sexual and reproductive health and rights in our time. Journal of Adolescent Health, 65(6), S51-S62.
- Biaukula, Kalisito, et al. "Young Key Populations in the HIV Response in the Asia and the Pacific" (2021)
