= LGBTQ rights in the Cook Islands =

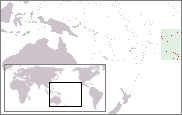
- Cook Islands
- Legal status: Legal since 2023
- Military: New Zealand's responsibility
- Discrimination protections: Protections in employment; sexual orientation only (see below)

Family rights
- Recognition of relationships: No recognition of same-sex couples

Lesbian, gay, bisexual, transgender and queer (LGBTQ) people in the Cook Islands face some legal challenges not experienced by non-LGBTQ residents, but these challenges have gradually lessened in recent years. As of 1 June 2023, homosexual acts between men became legal in the Cook Islands after a vote by the Parliament of the Cook Islands. Female homosexual acts have never been illegal. Same-sex marriage is outlawed. Nevertheless, LGBTQ people do enjoy some limited legal protections, as employment discrimination on the basis of sexual orientation has been banned since 2013.

Homosexual relations and transgender people have been part of Cook Islander culture for centuries. Historically, transgender people (nowadays called akava'ine; literally to behave like a woman) were seen as an important part of the family and the local tribe. The arrival of foreign Christian missionaries quickly changed societal acceptance, and the first anti-gay laws in the Cook Islands were enacted thereafter. The only LGBTQ advocacy group in the Cook Islands is the Te Tiare Association. The group officially launched in June 2008, and encourages debates on the issue and has organised events with the aim of raising awareness of the lives of LGBTQ people.

== History ==
The Cook Islands, much like the rest of Polynesia, used to be tolerant of same-sex relationships and transgender people before the arrival of Christianity.

The colloquial term for men who act like women is laelae. Culturally, laelae are different from gay or transgender people. The term refers to a wide range of people, as it does throughout Polynesia, some of whom may identify as female but are biologically male, as both male and female, or as neither. Laelae engage in women's work, such as cooking, cleaning and sewing, tend to socialise with women and tend to wear female clothing, but have little desire to have sex with other laelae. They typically have sex with heterosexual men, who do not consider themselves, nor are they considered by others, to be "homosexual". Nowadays, there exists a relative tolerance and acceptance of laelae in terms of their public behaviour (their cross-dressing and dance performances are regarded with fascination by both men and women), but a near complete avoidance of laelae sexuality as a topic of discussion. Dr. Kalissa Alexeyeff, of the University of Melbourne, states that the introduction of Western understandings of sexuality and gender has resulted in laelae sexuality being taboo. Laelae who are caught engaging in homosexual relations are often beaten up by male family members.

Early on in fieldwork, I commented on the camp demeanour of a prominent Cook Islands performer, who wore loud, brightly coloured, frilly shirts and whose flamboyant acts resembled those of Elton John or Peter Allen. My female companion replied with some hostility: 'No! He has a son. He's not gay. He's a laelae.' This comment was made despite the fact that the woman worked with the man's current partner and it appeared—to me at least—blatantly obvious that the two were sexually involved. When I asked what the difference was, she said that laelae 'just love the girls' whereas 'gays sleep with men'.

Since the 2000s, the Māori word akava'ine has come to refer to transgender people from the Cook Islands.

== Laws regarding same-sex sexual activity ==
Homosexuality was decriminalised by an act of Parliament on 1 June 2023. Prior to that, male homosexual activity was illegal in the Cook Islands under the Crimes Act 1969. Consensual male sodomy was punishable by up to seven years' imprisonment, while indecency between males was punishable by up to five years' imprisonment. The law was inherited from the former British Empire. Prosecutions were rare, however.

The sections of the Crimes Act 1969 which previously criminalised homosexuality were the following:

Section 154. Indecency between males

(1) Every one is liable to imprisonment for a term not exceeding five years who, being a male,

(a) Indecently assaults any other male; or
(b) Does any indecent act with or upon any other male; or
(c) Induces or permits any other male to do any indecent act with or upon him

(2) No boy under the age of fifteen years shall be charged with committing or being a party to an offence against paragraph (b) or paragraph (c) of subsection (1) of this section, unless the other male was under the age of twenty-one years.
(3) It is not defence to a charge under this section that the other party consented.

Section 155. Sodomy

(1) Every one who commits sodomy is liable

(a) Where the act of sodomy is committed on a female, to imprisonment for a term not exceeding fourteen years;
(b) Where the act of sodomy is committed on a male, and at the time of the act that male is under the age of fifteen years and the offender is of over the age of twenty-one years, to imprisonment for a term not exceeding fourteen years;
(c) In any other case, to imprisonment for a term not exceeding seven years.

(2) This offence is complete upon penetration.
(3) Where sodomy is committed on any person under the age of fifteen years he shall not be charged with being a party to that offence, but he may be charged with being a party to an offence against section 154 of this Act in said case to which that section is applicable.
(4) It is no defence to a charge under this section that the other party consented.

Section 159. Keeping Place of resort for homosexual acts

Every one is liable to imprisonment for a term not exceeding ten years who-

(a) Keeps or manages, or acts or assists in the management of, say premises used as a place of resort for the commission of indecent acts between males; or
(b) Being the tenant, lessee, or occupier of any promises, knowingly permits the premises or any part thereof to be used as a place of resort for the commission of indecent acts between males; or
(c) Being the lessor or landlord of any premises, or the agent of the lessor or landlord, lets the premises or any part thereof with the knowledge that the premises are to be used as a place of resort for the commission of indecent acts between males, or that some part thereof is to be so used, or is wilfully a party to the continued use of the premises or any part thereof as a place of resort for the commission of such acts as aforesaid.

Sections 152 and 153 of the Criminal Code set the age of consent for vaginal intercourse at 16. Lesbian sex is not mentioned at all in local laws, as was the case in the laws of the former British Empire.

=== Crimes Bill 2017 ===
Announced in August 2017, the draft Crimes Bill 2017 would decriminalise same-sex sexual activity between men. Public submissions to the parliamentary committee examining the bill began on 9 August. Due to the June 2018 general elections, public consultations on the bill were put on hold. However, following opposition from churches, a committee reinstated the ban on 5 November 2019 and inserted a clause extending the ban to women. In response, the Democratic Party called for a review, stating that the reinsertion of the clauses "breach[es] the United Nations Declaration of Human Rights ... and the nation's own Constitution". The Cook Islands Tourism Industry Council has expressed concerns the bill could negatively affect the islands' tourism industry.

The bill has received the support of Marie Pa Ariki, an influential tribal chief, who has called the anti-gay law "unfair". Conversely, the Religious Advisory Council has expressed concerns of foreign "pressure" to abandon "Christian principles", which led to calls of irony as Christianity itself is a foreign addition to Cook Islander culture.

Parliament was set to debate the bill in September 2020, however, media and news came out that several Cook Islands bills had been "deferred" to 2021 within the committee stage - due to COVID-19.

In 2022, the debate was again postponed to March 2023.

=== Crimes (Sexual Offences) Amendment Bill 2023 ===
On 14 April 2023, the Parliament passed the Crimes (Sexual Offences) Amendment Bill 2023 which, among other things, repealed sections 154, 155 and 159 of the Crimes Act 1969. It came into effect on June 1. The bill was passed with a clear majority with 19 MPs favouring the legislation and 4 against it.

== Recognition of same-sex relationships ==
Same-sex marriage was outlawed by the Marriage Amendment Act 2000. The law was clarified in 2007 to state that "no person shall be permitted to marry another person who is of the same gender as him or herself," and to legislatively define the gender of transsexuals. On 28 April 2013, Prime Minister Henry Puna expressed his personal opposition to the legalisation of same-sex marriage. The Registrar of the High Court (Retita o te Akavaanga Teitei) has the power to void and dissolve marriages that violate the law.

Civil unions are not recognised either (though both civil marriage and civil unions by same-sex couples are recognised and performed in New Zealand).

== Discrimination protections ==
Discrimination on the basis of "sexual preference" is prohibited in employment, according to Section 55(e) of the Employment Relations Act 2012, which entered into force on 1 July 2013.

Section 10(g) of the Cook Islands Disability Act 2008 prohibits discrimination against disabled persons based on their sexual orientation.

== Statistics ==
2016 data from the United Nations Development Programme estimated that there were between 500 and 800 men who have sex with men and transgender people in the Cook Islands, of whom 40% reported feeling ashamed about their identity and 30% felt low self-esteem. All reported having had sexual intercourse, and 22% reported having had both male and female sexual partners in the last 12 months.

The Cook Islands News reported in late 2019 that a survey from the University of the South Pacific showed that, of 674 Cook Islands college students, 9.1% identified as LGBTQ, and 22.7% "refused or were unsure about" which categories to put themselves into.

== Living conditions ==
The Cook Islands Christian Church is the largest religion on the islands, with more than half of the population claiming an affiliation to it. The Congregationalist church believes that homosexuality and cross-dressing are signs of immorality and this impacts both public attitudes as well as government policy. The Cook Islands LGBTQ community feels the need to be discreet and travel advisories also urge visitors to be discreet and not to engage in public displays of affection. The travel website cookislands.org.uk reports that homosexuality is generally accepted and a laissez-faire attitude is taken to tourists, though public displays of affection may offend.

== Summary table ==
Same-sex sexual activity legal	Yes (Since 2023)
Equal age of consent (16)	Yes (Since 2023)
Anti-discrimination laws in employment only	Yes (Since 2013)
Anti-discrimination laws in the provision of goods and services	No
Anti-discrimination laws in all other areas (Incl. indirect discrimination, hate speech)	No
Same-sex marriages	No
Recognition of same-sex couples	No
Stepchild adoption by same-sex couples	No
Joint adoption by same-sex couples	No
Gays, lesbians and bisexuals allowed to serve openly in the military	Yes (New Zealand's responsibility)
Right to change legal gender	No
Access to IVF for lesbians	No
Commercial surrogacy for gay male couples	No
MSMs allowed to donate blood	No

== See also ==
- Human rights in the Cook Islands
- LGBTQ rights in New Zealand
- LGBTQ rights in Oceania
