= Palopa =

Third gender in Papua New Guinea

- Etymology: From Jennifer Lopez
- Classification: Gender identity

Other terms
- Associated terms: Fakaleiti, Two-spirit, Trans woman, Akava'ine, Māhū

Demographics
Regions with significant populations
- Papua New Guinea

Palopa is a term used in Papua New Guinea and its diaspora to refer to people whose gender identity or sexuality does not conform to heteronormative standards, and who, in Western contexts, might identify as part of the LGBT+ community.

== Etymology ==
The term originates from Tok Pisin, a creole language spoken in the country. The term is a contraction of the name of the singer Jennifer Lopez, which was used as a coded expression within the community.

== Origin ==
LGBTQ+ activist Clint Woolly has pointed out that many people in Papua New Guinea might perceive Western terms like “gay” or “lesbian” as stigmatizing, and has thus advocated for adopting culturally relevant terms like palopa. This word offers an alternative without negative connotations, in a context where local expressions like geli-geli ('girlie-girlie') or askan ('arse cunt') are used pejoratively toward LGBT+ individuals. In response to this environment, gay and transgender people in Port Moresby have begun to use palopa as an affirmative way to refer to themselves.

The term not only allows for stronger cultural identification, but also contributes to the visibility of diverse gender and sexual identities from an Indigenous perspective. This phenomenon is part of a broader movement across the Pacific that wants to reclaim and legitimize traditional categories such as faʻafafine in Samoa or takatāpui in Aotearoa (New Zealand).

On a social level, people who identify as palopa often face various forms of discrimination and violence. In a 2011 study, 57% of transgender individuals interviewed—many of whom identified as palopa—had experienced physical violence, and 47% had experienced sexual violence. These percentages were even higher among those engaged in sex work. In many cases, the perpetrators were police officers.

Organizations like the United Territories of Pacific Islanders Alliance have affirmed palopa identity as a legitimate expression of gender diversity that predates colonial influence.

Additionally, there are other culturally specific expressions of gender within the country, such as the term kwolu-aatmwol, used by the Simbari people to describe a third gender identity. In some cases this same word is used to refer to intersex individuals.
