= Joey Joleen Mataele =

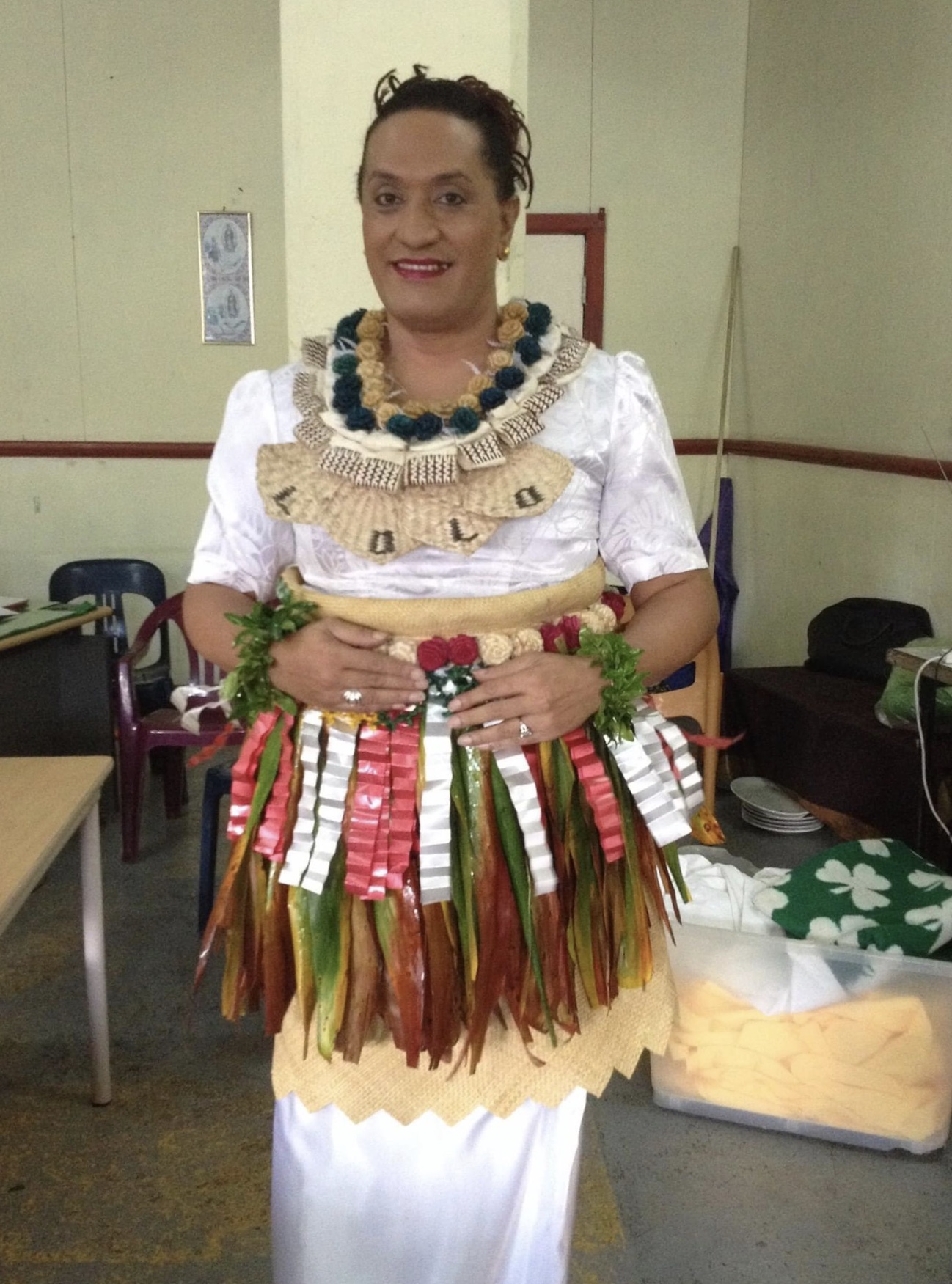
- Born: Tonga
- Occupations: Campaigner; Executive Director; International Representative; Chairperson
- Organization: Tonga Leitis' Association - TLA
- Known for: Transgender and LGBTQ+ campaigning and advocacy
- Movement: Transgender Women and LGBT rights movement

Joey Joleen Mataele is a Tongan activist for the rights of transgender women.

== Activism ==
In 1992, Mataele co-founded the Tonga Leitis Association and became its executive director. She is the Chairperson of the Commonwealth Equality Network (TCEN).

In 1993, Mataele founded the Miss Galaxy Queen Pageant as an annual event to celebrate the diversity and creativity of fakaleiti and the LGBTQ community in Tonga.

Mataele is also the co-founder of the Pacific Sexual Diversity Network, which was established in 2007 during the Pacific Games in Samoa. The organisation includes members from Polynesian nations such as Fiji, Samoa, the Cook Islands and Papua New Guinea. It aims to work together to gain a stronger voice at regional and international gatherings.

Mataele is the subject of the feature documentary film Leitis in Waiting.

== Honour and award ==
=== Honour ===
- Tonga: Knight of the Order of Sālote Tupou III

=== Award ===
- United Kingdom: Recipient of the Daily Points of Light Award
