= Akava'ine =

Third gender in Māori culture of Cook Islands

Akava'ine is a Cook Islands Māori word which has come, since the 2000s, to refer to transgender people of Māori descent from the Cook Islands.

It may be an old custom but has a contemporary identity influenced by other Polynesians, through cross-cultural interaction of Polynesians living in New Zealand, especially the Samoan fa'afafine, Third Gender people who hold a special place in Samoan society.

== Terms and etymology ==
According to the Cook Islands Maori dictionary (1995) 'akava'ine is the prefix aka ("to be or to behave like") and va'ine ("woman"), or simply, "to behave as a woman". (Antonym: 'akatāne ("act manly, or tomboyishly").)

The New Zealand Māori word Whakawahine has a parallel meaning, and the Samoan word fa'afafine and the Malagasy word sarambavy.

According to Alexeyeff, Akava'ine is a Cook Islands Māori word for women who have an inflated opinion of themselves, draw attention to themselves in ways that disrupt groupness, do not heed others' advice, or who act in a self-serving or self-promoting way.

Sometimes the word laelae is also used typically when implying criticism or ridicule of feminine behaviour displayed by a man, for example being described as effeminate or homosexual. Laelae is the colloquial Cook Islands term, it is similar to raerae used in Tahiti.

The word tutuva'ine (meaning "like a woman") is used less frequently and normally refers to a cross-dresser or a drag queen.

Homosexuality was illegal for males in the Cook Islands until 2023. There are movements across the Pacific Islands advocating for the expansion of LGBTQ+ rights, including the rights of akava'ine.

== History ==
Pacific Islanders have a long history of integration, positions of authority, respect and acceptance towards gender-variant individuals. After the arrival of English missionaries during the 19th-century, this quickly began to change.

Marshall (1971:161) denied that there were "homosexuals" on Mangaia in the Cook Islands, while estimating there were two or three berdache "men on Mangaia who enjoy women's work, may have a feminine figure, and—to some degree—may dress like a woman" (Marshall 1971:153). "There is no social disapproval of the indications of transvestism". The boys and men he observed who enjoyed and excelled at women's work and who "are frequently called upon to assist in cooking, feasts, sewing pillowcases, and cutting out dresses and dress patterns" and "show no apparent wish for male sexual partners". Beaglehole (1938:287) also asserted of another locale in the Cook Islands that

perversions, in the sense of sexual practices that take the place of sexual intercourse, are probably unknown in Pukapuka. This is without prejudice to acts or feeling attitudes that may accompany ontogenetic character development in the strict analytical sense but which, even if they occur may not properly be classed as perversions. There is no word in Pukapukan speech to indicate homosexuality, nor could informants say that it ever occurred. At present there is one youth in Yato village who is said to wakawawine (be like a woman): between 16 and 17 years old, he appears fully developed physically but has a rather effeminate high-pitched voice. He wears men's clothes. He does not stroll about the village as do other young men who congregate first in one open house, then in another, for gossip. He performs general women's work, make plaited and beaded objects, sews more than is usual for a male, and cooks. He also does a little men's work, fishing, nut gathering and husking, and sennit-making. He occasionally wrestles with other men but does not participate in most sports. Peculiarities in his behavior are noticed by fellow villagers but not commented upon openly.

Nearly two decades later Beaglehole (1957:191) did not follow-up on the wakawawine—or even recall him—in writing that

Homosexuality is an unknown practice in Aitutaki. Only two instances of berdache-like behaviors could be recalled by informants. Two adolescent boys gave up fishing and gardening in favour of women's work and acquired a high reputation in the community for their skills at housework, embroidery and mat-making. One boy ultimately married and adjusted to a man's role; the other left the island and settled elsewhere.

== Contemporary culture ==
In the late 1990s, the term laelae, a borrowing from the Tahitian raerae or Rae rae, was the most commonly used term to describe "traditional" transgender categories and individuals considered to be "gay".

The usage of the Māori word 'Akava'ine for a transgender person seems to be recent, as no evidence of it as an established gender role in Cook Islands Māori society: it is not documented in the various detailed written encounters of the Māori people during the pre-Christian era to the mid-late 1800s to early 1900s, although these accounts are almost all by Westerners and missionaries. In contrast, Transgender people are mentioned in records of Samoa (Fa'afafine), Tahiti and Hawai'i (Māhū).

Homosexuality was outlawed in the Cook Islands for men whereas women were always free to have homosexual relations.

Some 'akava'ine take part in the making of tivaevae (quilts), an activity traditionally done by the women of the community.

Te Tiare Association Inc (TTA) was formally incorporated on 30 November 2007 at the Rarotonga High Court; an organisation set up to bring together 'akava'ine in the Cook Islands, to help nurture, strengthen and educate them so that they can help themselves. On 21 June 2008, there was the official launch of TTA and the launch of a partnership between TTA and the Pacific Islands Aids Foundation.

== See also ==
- LGBT rights in the Cook Islands
- List of transgender-related topics

== Bibliography ==
- Alexeyeff, Kalissa (2009). Dancing from the heart: movement, gender, and Cook Islands globalization. University of Hawaii Press. ISBN 978-0-8248-3244-5.
- G. G. Bolich Ph.D. (2007). Transgender History & Geography: Crossdressing in Context, Volume 3. Psyche's Press. ISBN 978-0-6151-6766-4.
- Murray, Stephen O. (2002). Pacific Homosexualities. iUniverse. ISBN 0-595-22785-6.
- Buse, Jasper; Taringa, Raututi (1995). Bruce Biggs; Rangi Moeka'a (eds.). Cook Islands Maori dictionary. The Ministry of Education, Government of the Cook Islands. ISBN 978-0-7286-0230-4.
- Marshall, Donald S.; Suggs, Robert C., eds. (1971). "Sexual Behavior on Mangaia". Human Sexual Behavior, Variations in The Ethnographic Spectrum. New York: Basic Books. ISBN 9780465031573.
- Beaglehole, Ernest (1957). Social change in the South Pacific; Rarotonga and Aitutaki. London: Allen & Unwin.
- Beaglehole, Ernest & Pearl (1938). Ethnology of Pukapuka. Honolulu: B.P. Bishop Museum Bulletin, 150.
