= Fakaleitī =

Third gender in Tongan culture

Fakaleitī are individuals in Tonga who are assigned male at birth but express a feminine gender identity. The term is derived from the Tongan prefix faka- ("in the manner of") and leitī, a borrowing from the English word lady, thus meaning "in the manner of a lady". Fakaleitī represent a diverse group with varying gender identities and sexual orientations, often adopting feminine dress and mannerisms influenced by Western styles. While they may be marginalized or face discrimination, especially in youth, fakaleitī are generally accepted within Tongan culture and extended families, and have become visible in areas such as entertainment, tourism, and community work.

== Gender expression ==
Fakaleitī constitute a heterogeneous group with diverse gender identities and sexual orientations, though many identify as androphilic (attracted to men). Some identify psychologically and socially as women, while others consider themselves to occupy a gender position outside the male-female binary. Their gender expression often includes feminine clothing, hairstyles, and makeup, typically influenced by Western or cosmopolitan styles rather than traditional Tongan dress. However, presentation may vary depending on context, with some fakaleitī adopting masculine attire in daily life and more feminine styles during social events.

The classification of fakaleitī does not align neatly with Western categories such as male, female, homosexual, transgender, or non-binary. In Tonga, the term has traditionally focused more on gender roles and behavior than on sexual identity. Fakaleitī may or may not experience gender dysphoria, and surgical transition is not universally pursued, as gender identity is often grounded in social roles rather than anatomical sex.

== Social status ==
Fakaleitī occupy a complex social position in Tongan society. While they are often marginalized and subject to discrimination or violence—especially in youth—they are generally accepted within family structures, which are foundational in Polynesian cultures. Some fakaleitī are vulnerable to sexual slavery, particularly those from economically disadvantaged backgrounds.

Despite societal ambivalence, fakaleitī often find employment in sectors associated with tourism, hospitality, and entertainment. Their involvement in activities perceived as modern or foreign, such as nightlife and non-marital relationships, has contributed to their association with social change and transnational influences. Within religious contexts, particularly the Christian churches central to Tongan society, fakaleitī may be accepted through their financial and social contributions, even as their gender and sexuality remain contested.

== Activism ==
The Tonga Leitis' Association organizes the Miss Galaxy Pageant in Tonga. They have also been involved in reforming colonially influenced laws about leitī life that remain in Tonga. In 2018, a documentary film, Leitis in Waiting, was made about leitī leader Joey Joleen Mataele and the efforts of the Tonga Leitis' Association. Mataele also works with the Pacific Equality Project, a non-profit group advocating for the decriminalization of LGBTQ people from post-colonial laws in the Pacific Islands.

== See also ==
- List of transgender-related topics
