= List of LGBTQ people from New Zealand =

This is a list of LGBTQ and takatāpui people from New Zealand.

== A ==
- Kiri Allan

== B ==
- Corey Baker
- Christopher Banks
- Tim Barnett
- Always Becominging
- Glen Bennett
- Dudley Benson
- Stephen Berry
- Jack Body
- Kelly Brazier
- Ryan Bridge
- Steve Broad
- Gayle Broughton
- Ron Brownson
- Ross Burden
- Bruce Burnett

== C ==
- Urzila Carlson
- Chris Carter
- Charles Chauvel
- Tāmati Coffey
- Lois Cox
- Max Currie

== D ==
- Heath Davis
- Andreas Derleth
- Anton Down-Jenkins
- Benjamin Doyle
- Katie Duncan
- Priscilla Duncan

== E ==
- Kate Elliott
- Peter Ellis
- Jan J. Eldridge

== F ==
- David Farrier
- Charles Farthing
- Chris Finlayson
- Amini Fonua
- Michaela Foster
- Paul Foster-Bell

== G ==
- Kurt Gänzl
- Grace Gooder
- Peter Gordon
- Maddy Green

== H ==
- Kevin Hague
- Claudette Hauiti
- Shanan Halbert
- Hudson and Halls
- David Hartnell
- Bill Hastings
- Richard Hills
- Laurel Hubbard
- Emma Humphries
- Prue Hyman

== I ==
- Witi Ihimaera
- Annamarie Jagose
- Hayley Jensen
- Sam Johnson
- Campbell Johnstone

== K ==
- Arielle Keil
- Elizabeth Kerekere
- Emma Kete
- Yuki Kihara
- Jonathan Kirkpatrick

== L ==
- Ladyhawke
- Shona Laing
- G.F. Laundon
- Damian Light
- Douglas Lilburn
- Jan Logie

== M ==
- Margaret Magill
- Renae Maihi
- Jonathan Mane-Wheoki
- Katherine Mansfield
- Robbie Manson
- Ricardo Menéndez March
- Lizzie Marvelly
- Alison Mau
- Stella Maxwell
- Matty McLean
- Heather McPherson
- Kyle Mewburn
- Mani Mitchell
- Anika Moa

== N ==
- Rex Nan Kivell
- Rosaleen Norton
- Shannon Novak

== O ==
- Paul O'Brien
- Grace O'Hanlon
- Karen O'Leary

== P ==
- Craig Parker
- Michael Parmenter
- Anna Paquin
- Bill Pearson
- A. W. Peet
- Liz Perry
- Mike Puru
- Grant Robertson

== R ==
- essa may ranapiri
- John Z Robinson
- Charles Rose
- Jenny Rowan
- Carmen Rupe

== S ==
- Madeleine Sami
- Frank Sargeson
- Amy Satterthwaite
- Jess Sayer
- Theo Schoon
- Blake Skjellerup
- Alice Snedden
- Freda Stark
- Todd Stephenson
- Toni Storm
- Maryan Street
- Chlöe Swarbrick

== T ==
- Lea Tahuhu
- Blyth Tait
- Rangimoana Taylor
- Ngahuia Te Awekotuku
- Samuel Te Kani
- Jay Tewake
- Ramon Te Wake
- Peter Thiel (citizen since 2011)
- Mahinārangi Tocker
- Leilani Tominiko
- Jools Topp
- Lynda Topp
- Chris Tse
- Philip Turner
- Ruby Tui
- Emma Twigg

== U ==
- Tangi Utikere

== W ==
- Louisa Wall
- Lisa Walton
- Marilyn Waring
- Olive Webb
- Peter Wells
- Meka Whaitiri
- Renee Wickliffe
- Valery Wichman
- Pere Wihongi
- Hannah Wilkinson
- Derek Williams
- Sara Wiseman
- Mimie Wood
- Portia Woodman
- Dan Wootton

== X ==
- Mika X

== Y ==
- Kirsty Yallop

== See also ==
- LGBT in New Zealand
- LGBT rights in New Zealand
