= LGBTQ people in New Zealand =

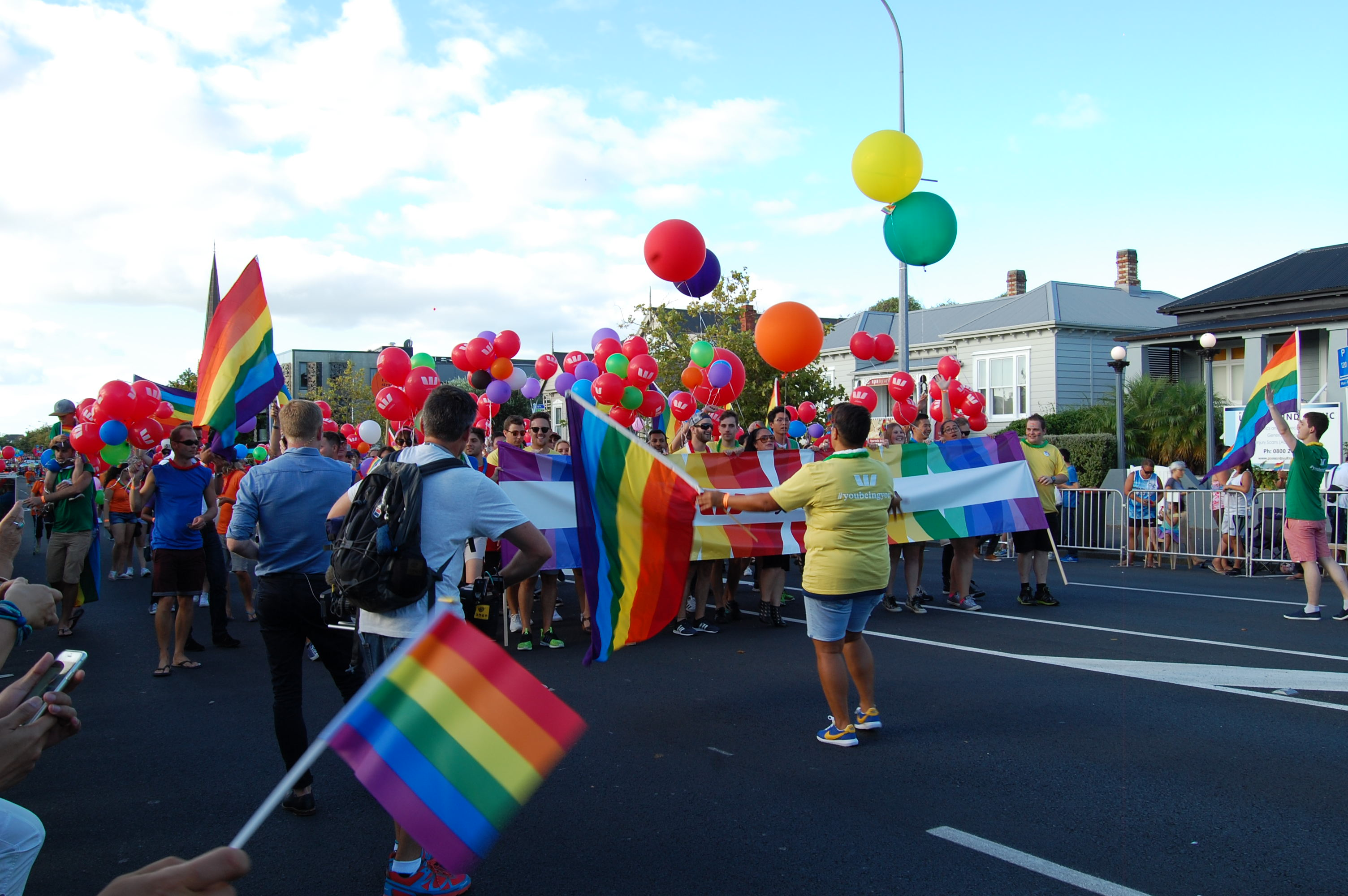
Rainbow flags flown at the Auckland Pride Festival, 2016

New Zealand society is generally accepting of lesbian, gay, bisexual, transgender and queer (LGBTQ) peoples. The LGBTQ-friendly environment is epitomised by the fact that there are several members of Parliament who belong to the LGBTQ community, LGBTQ rights are protected by the Human Rights Act, and same-sex couples are able to marry as of 2013. Sex between men was decriminalised in 1986. New Zealand has an active LGBTQ community, with well-attended annual gay pride festivals in most cities.

The 2021 Household Economic Survey, conducted by Statistics New Zealand, estimated there to be 169,500 LGBTQ people aged 18 and over in New Zealand, 4.4 percent of the adult population.

== History ==
=== Pre-colonial ===
The Māori language word takatāpui had historically referred to devoted relationships between people of the same sex, but in modern terminology encompasses LGBT identity and sexuality. The word whakawāhine (literally 'to become a woman') describes those who were assigned male at birth but are female, while the term tangata ira tāne has the opposite meaning, that being a person assigned female at birth but is male.

Homosexuality and same-sex relationships, gender diversity, and people of diverse sex characteristics, have been documented in New Zealand for centuries. Academic Elizabeth Kerekere has found that prior to the imposition of colonial law and morality, takatāpui were simply "part of the whānau [family]." Same-sex relationships and activities appear to have been acceptable amongst pre-colonial Māori. Some stories, for example that of Tutanekai and Tiki, centre on same-sex couples. A British missionary, Richard Davis, found homosexual relationships between men to be a familiar part of Māori life, and although homosexual relationships between women have not been well documented, they were certainly not condemned.

=== Colonisation and criminalisation ===
Some of the earliest European colonists in New Zealand were Christian missionaries who arrived in the early nineteenth century and eventually converted most of the Māori population to Christianity. They brought with them the Christian doctrine that sodomy was sinful, meaning many Māori were forced to hide or destroy evidence of their takatāpui selves. Despite this, one missionary, William Yate, was sent back to England in disgrace after being caught engaging in sex with young Māori men.

When New Zealand became a British colony in 1840, British law was adopted in its entirety, making "buggery" illegal and a capital offence. In 1893, all kinds of sexual activity between men was criminalised, with penalties including imprisonment, hard labour, and flogging. Sexual acts between women were never criminalised.

=== Underground subculture ===
Despite discriminatory laws, a small queer subculture developed. European settlers on the goldfields or in rural areas were mostly male, and some had sexual relationships with each other. However, as settlers began to move to cities the numbers of convictions for same-sex activities increased.

A number of gay men were involved in New Zealand's literary subculture, including Frank Sargeson. However even in these circles, homosexuality was not always accepted.

By as early as the 1930s, queer subcultures were so developed that a shared language had developed, emerging out of "elements of prison slang, pig Latin, Polari, gay slang, Māori and localised dialect," used primarily by male and trans women sex workers. These communities often referred to themselves as "kamp." Carmen Rupe identified as kamp when she was living in Auckland in the 1950s, and recalled "three aunties" who her particular kamp circle revolved around; Hinemoa and Freda, who were Māori, and Auntie Mamie, from Rarotonga. Rupe writes that all three "went to great trouble and effort preparing for their parties", which were the centre of this community.

Alongside private parties, nightlife venues were a key part of these communities. After the change of licensing laws in 1967, Rupe was able to found her first of several famous establishments, Carmen's International Coffee Lounge, located on Vivian Street in Wellington. "Carmen's" was a social hub for people from all walks of life, often attracted to the venue by the notoriety of its openly trans proprietor. However, it also operated as a relatively safe space for queer people, one of a series of trans-owned and operated establishments that both socially and economically supported local communities. Chrissy Witoko's "The Evergreen" was another such venue, also on Vivian Street, established in 1984. Hers was renown as a safe community hub, and was also a drop-in centre for both local gay and lesbian activist and support groups, and for sex workers, prior to the establishment of the New Zealand Prostitutes' Collective. In late 1971, the KG (Kamp Girls) club for lesbians was formed in Auckland.

=== LGBT Organisations ===
In 1962, the Dorian Society was founded in Wellington for gay men. In early 1972, Gay Liberation groups sprang up in Auckland, Wellington and Christchurch in response to the formation of the Gay Liberation Front. Also in 1972, Hedesthia, the first recorded trans organisation in New Zealand, was established. Although primarily a social club, Hedesthia members were pioneering in their advocacy work, reaching out to the media and various community organisations in order to educate the public about trans issues. Noted mycologist Gillian F. Laundon was a member of Hedesthia, and in 1976 she also set up an off-shoot group which focused specifically on supporting transsexuals, called TransFormation.

The Sisters for Homophile Equality (SHE), a lesbian feminist collective, formed in Wellington in 1973. In December of that year, SHE began to publish Circle, later renamed Lesbian Feminist Circle; the magazine continued to publish until 1986.

In 1989, the Auckland Lesbian and Gay Youth (ALGY) group formed, later changing its name in 1995 to RainbowYOUTH.

In the 1980s, Body Positive was formed as a peer support organisation providing care and support to LGBTQ people living with HIV/AIDS in New Zealand, as well as advocating and combat stigma surrounding HIV.

=== Activism and law reform ===
One year after the Dorian Society was formed, it established a legal subcommittee – the Wolfenden Association – out of which the Homosexual Law Reform Society emerged. Attempts to change the law included a petition presented to Parliament by the Homosexual Law Reform Society in 1968.

Violence against gays and lesbians was often condoned. In 1964, Charles Aberhart was beaten to death in Christchurch's Hagley Park by a group of men who claimed he had propositioned them. They were tried for murder but found not guilty. As in many countries, homosexuals were often committed to mental institutions and given 'treatment' for what was rendered a mental illness.

In 1972, academic Ngahuia Te Awekotuku was denied a visitor permit to the United States on the grounds that she was a homosexual. Publicity around the incident was a catalyst in the formation of the Gay Liberation groups in Wellington, Christchurch and Auckland. Led by Te Awekotuku, "Gay Day", occurred in April 1972 in Auckland, one of the first direct action protests by the newly formed Auckland Gay Liberation Front.

The 1970s saw the growth of the modern feminist and gay movements in New Zealand. Trans activism also continued to develop during this period, with pioneers like Rupe breaking boundaries through running for Wellington Mayor in 1977, and Laundon in that same year successfully petitioning for the right to use women's restrooms at her place of work.

Trans, gay, and lesbian activist groups were not mutually exclusive, and involved people from a diverse range of backgrounds and identities, as well as significant crossover. For example, Hedesthia was an official Associate Member of the National Gay Rights Coalition, an umbrella organisation created in 1977 which sought to sew unity among the diverse gay activist community. Suzan Xtabay, Hedesthia's national co-ordinator, declared that trans people had:

...a responsibility to all gay people to support them, because any advantages that are finally won, wrested from the establishment WILL benefit all of us...it's our cause, YOUR cause, and don't any of you forget it. Hedesthia HAS a place in the Gay movement, and so have ALL of its members.

After several attempts, the Homosexual Law Reform Act was passed in 1986, decriminalising sexual activity between men over the age of 16. In 1993, discrimination on the grounds of sexual orientation was outlawed. In 2004 New Zealand instituted civil union (for both same-sex and opposite sex couples), and in 2013 same-sex marriage was legalised.

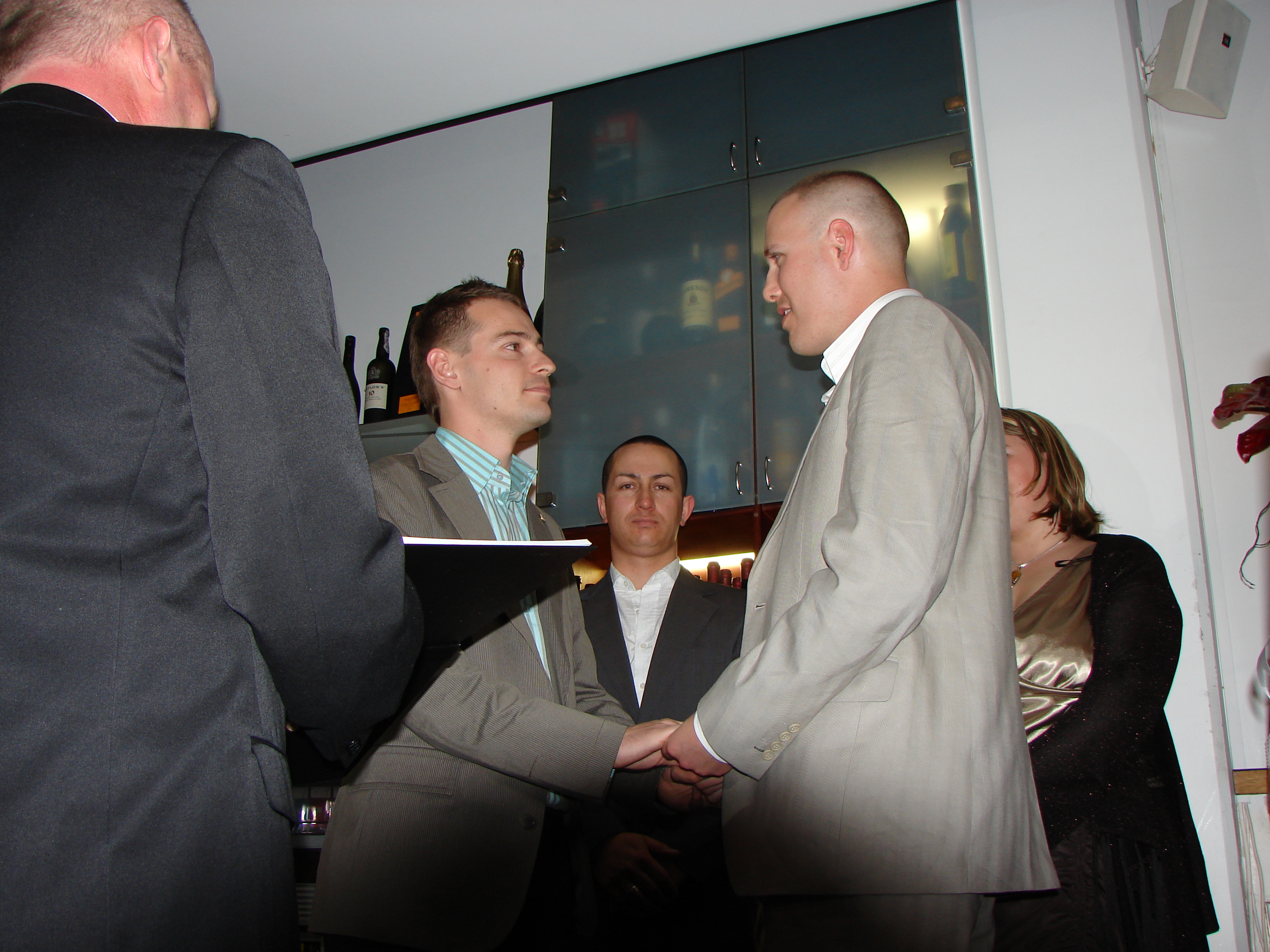
A civil union ceremony in Wellington in December 2006

New Zealand was unique in passing homosexual law reform in the midst of the AIDS crisis. The New Zealand AIDS Foundation was established in 1985.

Supporters of reform argued that removing the stigma from homosexuality would help prevent the spread and aid the treatment of disease. AIDS has primarily affected the gay male community in New Zealand (since records began in 1985, 53.7 percent of new HIV cases have been reported to be acquired by "male homosexual contact"), and gay men are prominent in AIDS fundraising and in running organisations such as the AIDS Foundation.

=== LGBT Pride ===
In 1991, one of New Zealand's prominent LGBT pride events, the Hero Parade, was founded in Auckland. This developed into a festival, the last Hero Parade held in 2001. However, the parade returned as the Auckland Pride Parade in 2012, then transitioned to become the Auckland Pride March in 2019.

Starting in 1986, Wellington hosted an annual "Lesbian and Gay Fair". This was renamed as the "Out in the Park" fair when it moved to a larger park. This in turn late evolved into the annual Wellington Pride Festival. The festival ties in with the Pride Parade which started in 2017, following on from several pride parades held in the 1990s.

== Demographics ==
Various surveys have recorded statistics on sexual orientation, including the Household Economic Survey, the General Social Survey, the New Zealand Attitudes and Values Study, the New Zealand Health Survey and the 2023 New Zealand census.

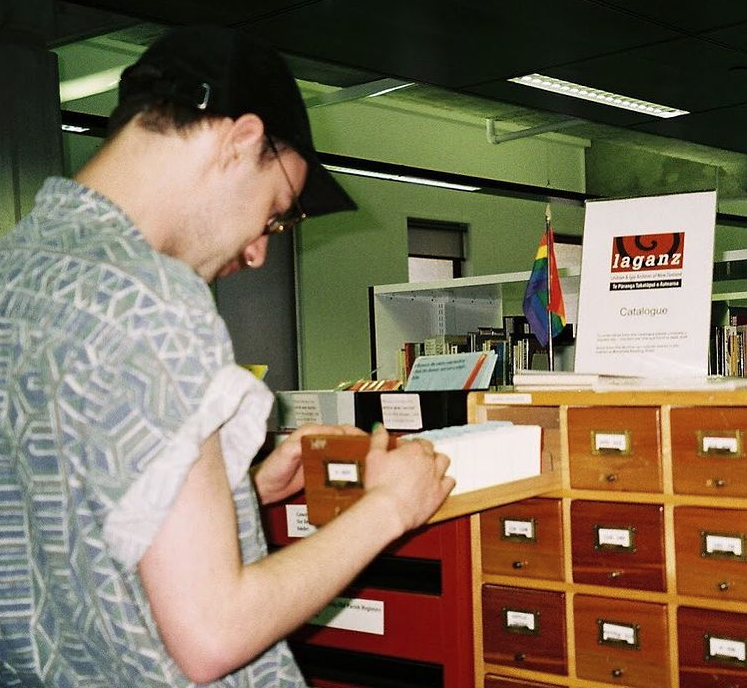
A visitor uses the card catalogue of Te Pūranga Takatāpui o Aotearoa, the Lesbian and Gay Archives of New Zealand.

=== Household Economic Survey 2021 ===
The Household Economic Survey 2021, conducted by Statistics New Zealand, surveyed 16,000 households including 32,000 people aged 18 and over. The Household Economic Survey started collecting data on sexual and gender identity in 2020.

According to the survey, there are approximately 169,500 LGBT adults in New Zealand, 4.4% of the country's population. This included approximately 79,300 bisexual people, 54,700 gay or lesbian people, 22,700 people of other sexual minorities (including bicurious, pansexual and asexual), 10,400 transgender people, and 9,000 non-binary people.

Approximately 64,100 (37.8%) of LGBT adults identified as male, 96,900 (57.2%) as female, and 8,500 (5.0%) as another gender. The Auckland region had the largest LGBT population at 56,300, followed by the Wellington region (27,100), Canterbury (22,800), and Waikato (16,600). With 6.3% identifying as LGBT, the Wellington region had the highest proportion of LGBT people relative to its population.

New Zealand's LGBT community is relatively young; over half (58.3%) of the LGBT population is aged under 35, compared to 29.6% of the non-LGBT population. In terms of ethnicity, 78.4% of the LGBT population are European (compared to 68.9% of the non-LGBT population), 16.1% are Māori (13.9%), 5.7% are Pacific peoples (6.7%) and 11.5% are Asian (17.2%) (totals add to more than 100% since people may identify with multiple ethnicities).

Around 32.0% of LGBT people had a bachelor or higher degree (compared to 27.0% of the non-LGBT population), and 12.6% had no formal qualifications (compared to 19.0%). Around 6.2% of the LGBT population are unemployed, 69.7% are employed, and 23.8% are not in the labour force (compared to 2.9%, 65.4% and 28.2% respectively for the non-LGBT population). The LGBT population had an average annual disposable income of NZ$37,396, compared to $42,793 for the non-LGBT population. However, once adjusted for age, the average annual disposable income is $42,709 for the LGBT population and $42,615 for the non-LGBT population.

=== Other surveys ===
According to the General Social Survey (GSS) of 2018, 3.5 percent of New Zealand adults identified as LGBT, with 1.9 percent identifying as bisexual and 1.1 percent as gay or lesbian. The 2016 New Zealand Attitudes and Values Study found that 94.2 percent of New Zealanders identified as straight or heterosexual, 2.6 percent as gay or lesbian, 1.8 percent bisexual, 0.6 percent bicurious, 0.5 percent pansexual and 0.3 percent asexual.

Another source of sexual orientation statistics comes from the New Zealand Health Survey commissioned by the Ministry of Health. There has not been an official release of the demographics but an article using the Health Survey for years 2016 to 2017 reported that 2.4 percent of the sampled population reported being homosexual or bisexual. However, there could be some under reporting given that 7.3 percent of the sample either did not know their sexual identity or refused to answer the question.

Statistics New Zealand has collected some information on same-sex couples who share a residence, recorded in censuses since 1996. The 2013 census recorded 16,660 people living in a same-sex couple in New Zealand – 0.9 percent of all couples (3,672 were male couples and 4,656 were female couples). Most same-sex couples did not have children (6,852, compared with 1,476 who had children). Statistics New Zealand proposed adding questions on sexual orientation and gender identity in the 2018 census; however, pre-census testing found the questions were poorly received by participants and the data collected was of sub-standard quality, so the proposal was dropped.

Following further work to improve questions, the 2023 census would be the first to collect gender and sexual identity, and variations of sexual characteristics from everyone in New Zealand. In early October 2024, the 2023 New Zealand census reported that 4.5% New Zealand adults (172,383) identified as LGBTIQ. Wellington had the highest number of people belonging to the LGBTIQ communities (11.3%), followed by Dunedin (7.3%), Christchurch (6%), Palmerston North (5.8%), Hamilton (5.6%) and Auckland (4.9%). In terms of sexual identity, 144,960 people over 15 years identified as other than heterosexual; 54% (78,300) bisexual, 30% (47,631) gay or lesbian, and 13% (19,026) as a different sexual identity that had not been classified. According to 2023 census data, 0.7% of the adult population (23,000) identified as transgender; including 5,013 transgender men, 5736 transgender women, and 15,348 transgender people of another gender. Less than o.5% of adults identified as non-binary. The 2023 census also reported that 0.4% of New Zealand's population (roughly 15,000) stated that they knew they were born with intersex characteristics.

=== Youth ===
A 2012 government survey of secondary school students (ages 13 to 18) recorded that 92 percent were exclusively attracted to the opposite sex, while 4 percent were attracted to the same sex or both sexes and 4 percent were not sure or were attracted to neither sex. Asked about gender identity, about 1 percent of students reported that they were transgender, while 3 percent were unsure.

== Prominent gay, lesbian, transgender and queer New Zealanders ==
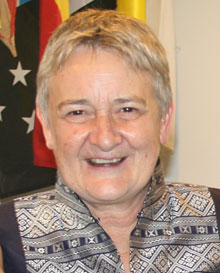
Feminist activist and politician Marilyn Waring openly identified as a lesbian after she left Parliament.

New Zealand has several LGBT people in parliament. Chris Carter (Labour, Minister of Conservation) became New Zealand's first openly gay MP when he outed himself shortly after being elected in 1993. Tim Barnett (Labour) was openly gay before being elected in 1996. Even earlier Marilyn Waring, a New Zealand National Party MP in the 1970s and 1980s, was also outed as a lesbian during her term and subsequently re-elected. She refused to comment at the time but "came out" in 1985, one year after her political career had ended. Since 2005 several more openly LGBT MPs have been elected, including for both the major parties. There have also been other openly gay government ministers, such as Attorney General Chris Finlayson who was the National Party's first openly gay minister, and Labour's Grant Robertson, the first openly gay Minister of Finance.

New Zealand also elected the world's first out transgender MP. Georgina Beyer was elected to Parliament in the 1999 election for the seat of Wairarapa, and left Parliament on 14 February 2007. Before entering parliament, Beyer was the world's first out transgender mayor, of the small town of Carterton.

New Zealand is also a home for Eliana Rubashkyn, an internationally known former LGBTI refugee, who became stateless several years in China after a severe case of discrimination due to her intersex variation, and received subsequently a universal recognition of her gender by a U.N. declaration, making her case a first in the world.

As in many other countries, there are numerous gays and lesbians involved in various branches of the arts. They include Whale Rider author Witi Ihimaera, dancers and choreographers Michael Parmenter and Douglas Wright, award-winning teen book author Paula Boock and former Chief Censor Judge Bill Hastings. The creator of the Rocky Horror Show Richard O'Brien also spent most of his childhood in Hamilton.

Openly LGBT New Zealand sportspeople include Equestrian Olympic medal winner Blyth Tait, Olympic speed skater Blake Skjellerup, footballer Hannah Wilkinson and Olympic diver Anton Down-Jenkins. New Zealand weightlifter Laurel Hubbard was the first openly transgender woman to compete in the Olympic Games.

== Today ==
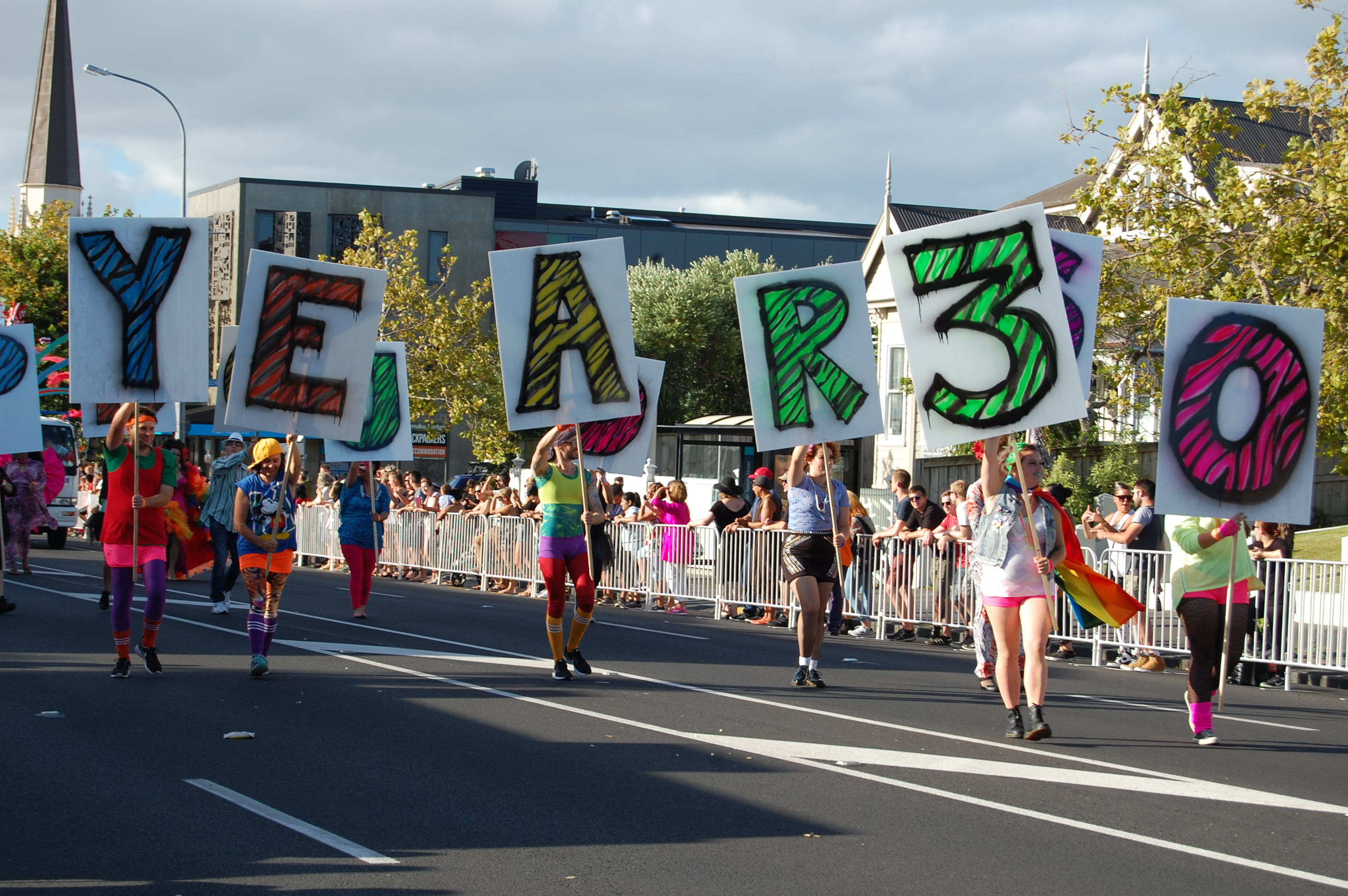
Commemorating the 30th anniversary of Homosexual Law Reform at the 2016 Auckland Pride Parade

Today, New Zealanders are generally accepting of gays and lesbians, although some homophobia is present. Same-sex partners are accepted as the equivalent of heterosexual couples for immigration and most other purposes.

The gay scene in New Zealand is reasonably small by international standards. However, Auckland has multiple LGBT venues and festivals, as well as being voted the "15th gayest city in the world" in 2013. Outside Auckland, larger cities and some towns host one or two LGBT pubs or clubs. Many smaller centres have LGBT organisations and social networks that cater to their community. In May 2015, PlanetRomeo, an LGBT social network, ranked New Zealand as the happiest country in Oceania (and the eleventh worldwide) for gay men.

A fortnightly lesbian event called 'Flirt' is held in Auckland, on the first and third Saturday of each month. Elaborate Lesbian Ball events are held annually in Auckland, Wellington, and Christchurch.

There are several gay and lesbian festivals in New Zealand. Hamilton, Wellington, Tauranga, Christchurch, and Dunedin host annual Pride Weeks, usually operated by the local UniQ, related youth-focussed organisations, or the New Zealand AIDS Foundation as a community-building initiative. The Out Takes film festival was a popular event in Auckland, Wellington and Christchurch, and while the organisation pulled the 2008 festival due to funding issues, it returned in 2009.

Until 2008, the Hero Festival was held in Auckland each February and included the Hero Parade, which attracted huge crowds, both gay and straight. Financial problems in 2001 led to the parade's demise. Still, the festival continued as a celebration of the city's LGBT citizens and comprised many events throughout February, including the popular Big Gay Out (in contrast to the music festival Big Day Out held in January), which is still held on the Sunday closest to Valentines Day each year. Hero was wrapped up in March 2009 but the Auckland Pride Festival has been held annually since 2013, and is the largest LGBT Festival in New Zealand.

Over the Christmas and New year period, many lesbian, gay, bisexual and transgender people attend summer camps at Vinegar Hill, New Zealand, in the Manawatū region and Uretiti Beach campsite.

Within same‐sex New Zealand couples, gay men tend to earn about 6–7% less money than their heterosexual counterparts in similar situations, and lesbian women tend to earn 6–7% more than heterosexual women. The earnings difference is higher in married couples than in those who are not married. Between 2013 and 2018, despite a societal improvement in perceptions toward sexual minorities, there was little or no change in the earnings difference.

Auckland is home to The Charlotte Museum, the only museum in the world dedicated to Lesbian history.

== Gay and lesbian publications ==
- GayNZ.com – Lesbian, Gay, Bisexual, and Transgender community news website for New Zealand.
- eikon – New Zealand
- Guysers Gazette The e-magazine produced by Guysers Gaystay, Rotorua, New Zealand
- express – Auckland, New Zealand, originally 'Man to Man', 1991–2014
- Tamaki Makaurau Lesbian Newsletter – Auckland 2, New Zealand, 1991–?
- Lesbian Feminist Circle – Wellington, New Zealand, "For Lesbians only" collectively produced c1973-1976
- Out!, 1976–2009
- Pink Triangle, 1979–1990
- Bitches, Witches, & Dykes – Auckland, New Zealand 1980–1981
- Lesbians in Print – Auckland, New Zealand, 1987
- Sapphic star Auckland, New Zealand c1989-1991
- UP magazine – Wellington, then nationwide, 2002–2006

== See also ==
- List of LGBT people from New Zealand
- LGBTQ culture in New Zealand
- LGBTQ rights in New Zealand
- Auckland Pride Festival
- Takatāpui, a Māori term for LGBT
- Homosexual Law Reform Act 1986
- HIV/AIDS in New Zealand
- Transgender rights in New Zealand
- Intersex rights in New Zealand
- GayNZ.com
- Hero Parade
