= GayNZ.com =

LGBT community website for New Zealand

- Screenshot of GayNZ.com as of 2008
- Website type: Online LGBTQ community lifestyle website
- Available in: English
- Owner: Out Loud Media Limited (NZ)
- Revenue: Advertising & Sponsorship
- Website: http://www.gaynz.com
- Commercial: Yes
- Registration: Not required
- Launched: 1997
- Current status: Operating

GayNZ.com is a lesbian, gay, bisexual, and transgender community website for New Zealand.

Prior to the websites closure in 2018, it posted daily local and international news stories, monitors fundamentalist Christian politics in New Zealand and associated anti-gay pressure groups, reports on political developments related to LGBT New Zealanders, discusses current issues related to HIV/AIDS, holds regular polls on topical LGBT issues, and has previews and reviews of music, theatre, film, television and literature.

GayNZ.com featured a variety of articles profiling a diverse range of LGBT New Zealanders, including Members of Parliament, people with disabilities, drag queens, New Zealanders of various ethnic backgrounds, and local celebrities.

The website also features a selection of blogs, a forum, a national LGBT event guide and a personals section.

== Background of LGBT life in New Zealand ==
New Zealanders are generally accepting of gays and lesbians, although low level homophobia (such as the use of the word 'gay' as an insult) is still common.

The gay social scene in New Zealand is small by international standards, especially outside Auckland. However, many smaller centres have LGBT organisations and social networks that cater to their community.

The internet is heavily used by gay men in New Zealand to meet others, especially in areas which lack specifically gay venues. GayNZ.com was along with gax express as a source of information and current affairs for New Zealand's LGBT population to connect with each other and learn about community issues.

== Journalism ==
Banks (pictured left), with New Zealand Labour MPs Chris Carter, Lianne Dalziel, Judith Tizard, Maryan Street, former Governor General Dame Catherine Tizard, British Labour MP Ben Bradshaw and others at the 2005 Great Hero Debate in Auckland.

Between 2003 and 2006, the senior writer at GayNZ.com was Christopher Banks. His feature articles focused mainly on social and political issues relevant to the gay community, or debunking religious arguments against homosexuality. Some articles were based around in-depth interviews with political or religious leaders.

Banks' writings for GayNZ.com also included a number of film reviews, two of which caused some upset in the conservative Christian community. His review of the controversial 2002 French film Irréversible was cited by the Society for the Promotion of Community Standards in their attempts to have the film banned by the Office of Film and Literature Classification (New Zealand). His positive review of Kinsey, the 2004 biopic of the American sex researcher, drew the ire of Investigate magazine editor Ian Wishart, prompting a further series of articles by Banks on Alfred Kinsey.

=== Son of MP's homophobic internet page ===
In September 2007, GayNZ.com published an article accusing the teenage son of National Party deputy leader Bill English of posting homophobic abuse on social networking site Bebo. GayNZ.com had unsuccessfully sought comment from English before publishing the story. After the story's publication, National leader John Key criticised the website for dragging a politician's son into public debate, and English sought legal advice about the article. A later complaint by English that The Southland Times had named his son was upheld in 2008, whereas GayNZ.com had not directly identified him.

=== Brian McFadden's homophobic radio comments ===
In August 2008, GayNZ.com drew attention to a number of disparaging remarks about gays and lesbians made by ex-boyband singer Brian McFadden while he co-hosted the morning breakfast show on More FM in Auckland, New Zealand. He stated, "Saying pink is a form of red is the same as saying homosexual is a form of male... In the old days there was no such thing as gay. It was frowned upon. The church would burn you at the stake. Modern day, if you are not gay, a man should not be wearing pink. Unless of course you're in the Americas Cup and you're one of these pansies who walk around with Gant t-shirts with your collars up, and you wear pink and you wear white trousers with those dirty brown slip-on shoes. Then you're just an idiot."

McFadden's comments were reported in news reports, gossip websites and weblogs worldwide, provoking considerable condemnation from the LGBT community. The singer later denied he was homophobic, saying through his publicist that his comments had been "taken out of context".

=== 2009 HIV infection case ===
In May 2009, GayNZ.com reported that a 40-year-old HIV+ man living in Auckland had allegedly been deliberately engaging in unsafe sex and had subsequently infected a number of other men. The story resulted in a formal police investigation and charges were laid when four of his male partners laid complaints with police investigators. The case may lead to a law change, after health officials revealed they were informed about the man several months before the police investigation commenced but had not informed the authorities due to "patient confidentiality".

== See also ==
- Auckland Pride Festival
- Civil unions in New Zealand
- Hero Parade
- Homosexual Law Reform Act
- LGBT New Zealand
- LGBT rights in New Zealand
- Out Takes: A Reel Queer Film Festival
- Same-sex marriage in New Zealand
- Gay and Lesbian Tourism New Zealand
