= LGBTQ culture in New Zealand =

LGBTQ culture in New Zealand encompasses the various artistic, social, and leisure expressions within the country that focus on sexual diversity or involve individuals with non-traditional sexualities and genders.

== Cinema ==
In 1980, the film Squeeze, directed by Richard Turner, premiered and became recognised as the first LGBT-themed feature film produced in New Zealand.

In May 1995, the inaugural Out Takes film festival took place in Wellington, New Zealand, aiming to showcase the best of local and international queer cinema. The week-long event screened 30 films and grew into a cherished space for the LGBT community, offering a chance to see queer individuals and stories on screen. The festival's success led to its expansion to Auckland, Christchurch, and Dunedin in subsequent years. After operating for nearly twenty years, the festival concluded in 2014.

== Literature ==
James Courage, a twentieth-century New Zealand writer, served as an LGBT representative in local literature. His play Private History premiered in London in 1938, and in 1959 he published the novel A Way of Love, which is considered the first openly LGBT New Zealand novel. However, due to its subject matter, the book was banned in 1962.

Frances Cherry built upon this legacy with her 1989 novel Dancing with Strings, marking the first New Zealand lesbian novel.

== Theatre ==
The earliest record of an openly gay play by a New Zealand playwright was Private Matters by James Courage. This premiered in London in 1938.

Multiple plays have been written about the notorious New Zealand con-artist Amy Bock, who lived as a man. These plays include works by Fiona Farell, Bruce Stewart and Julie McKee.

The iconic 1973 musical, Rocky Horror Show (later adapted to the film with a cult following) was written by New Zealander Richard O'Brien. The film went on to become one of the most culturally significant representations of gender diversity of the 1970s. O'Brien has referred to himself as transgender. A statue of the musical's character Riff-Raff stands next to Hamilton's BNZ Theatre in honour of O'Brien's services to theatre and queer communities in his hometown and abroad.

In 1996, Lorae Parry first performed her play Eugenia, set in 1916. The titular protagonist is a woman who lives as a man, and was revolutionary in the way it presented queer identity. Eugenia is still studied for its treatment of gender and sexuality, and is considered a classic piece of New Zealand theatre.

Bruce Mason, a significant playwright and 1980 recipient of the CBE for his services to the arts, was a closeted gay man. In 2025 his daughter Belinda wrote about his struggles with his sexuality in Unforgetting: A Memoir.

One of the most well-known LGBTQ playwrights from Aotearoa is Renee, who described herself as "lesbian feminist with socialist working-class ideals". In 1997 a collection of her plays, titled Intimate Acts: Eight Contemporary Lesbian Plays, was published by New York publishers Brito & Lair.

New Zealand playwright and historian Kurt Gänzl wrote the highly regarded reference book, The Encyclopedia of Musical Theatre.

Contemporary LGBTQ theatre makers of note in Aotearoa include:

- Sam Brooks
- Victor Roger
- Jess Sayer
- Tom Sainsbury
- Mitch Tawhi-Thomas
- Jo Randerson
- Amanaki Prescott-Faletau
- Ahi Karunaharan
- Julia Croft

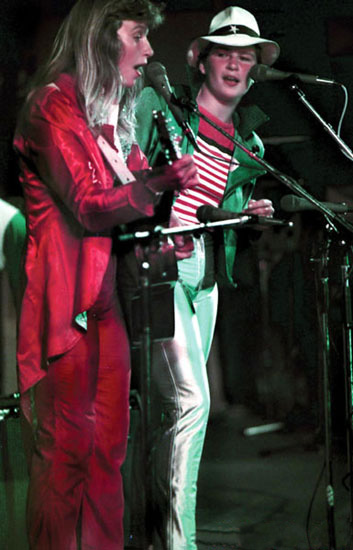
Topp Twins in 1981

== Entertainment ==
The Topp Twins were a comedy and music duo of twin sisters Jools and Lynda Topp, both identifying as lesbian, they started publicly performing music together in the 1970s and they went on to have a long career. Jools Topp died in 2026 and along with Lynda was honoured with the Arts Foundations of New Zealand Icon Whakamana Hiranga award in 2026 for more than 40 years of entertaining people reaching an international audience as well as popularity in New Zealand. The Topp Twins featured in a documentary called Untouchable Girls released in 2009.

== Television ==
On 27 April 1967, New Zealand broadcast what was likely its first television episode focusing on the LGBT community. This broadcast aired as part of the local current affairs programme called Compass.

On 5 February 1996, the first edition of the television segment "LGBT Express Report" was launched, which quickly evolved into "Queer Nation", the first LGBT television programme in New Zealand broadcast by Television New Zealand. "Queer Nation" remained on air for a decade.

== Drag ==
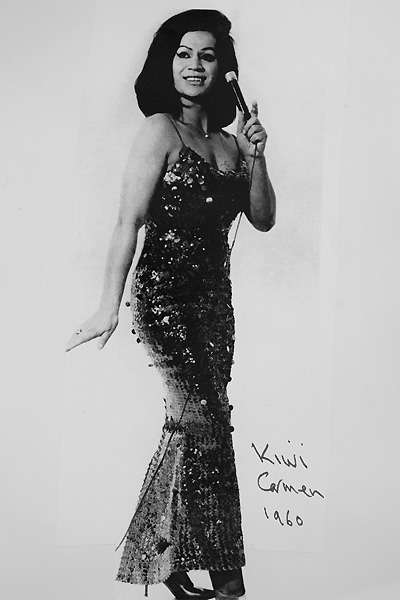
Carmen Rupe in 1960

Twentieth-century drag performance in New Zealand was shaped by individuals who challenged the social norms of their era. In 1966, performer Carmen Rupe, regarded as the country's first celebrity drag queen, won a court case that validated her right to wear feminine clothing. This legal battle followed an arrest for alleged "offensive behaviour" stemming solely from her choice of attire.

In the twenty-first century, drag culture in New Zealand has flourished with the rise of artists such as Spankie Jackzon and Kita Mean. Spankie Jackzon made an impact on the scene, winning the second season of RuPaul's Drag Race Down Under in 2022, following a victory on the second season of House of Drag in 2020. Her career began in 2005 and developed further in Melbourne, where she hosted nightclubs.

Kita Mean co-hosted House of Drag and achieved recognition by winning the first season of RuPaul's Drag Race Down Under. Alongside Anita Wigl'it, she helped organise the Drag Wars monthly event and co-owns Caluzzi Cabaret and the Phoenix Venue in Auckland.

== Festivals ==
LGBTQ+ pride is celebrated in New Zealand largely throughout February and March, as well as during the worldwide Pride Month in June. In addition to local festivals New Zealand also celebrates global observances such as International Transgender Day of Visibility and Lesbian Visibility Week.

== See also ==
- LGBTQ people in New Zealand
- LGBTQ rights in New Zealand
- LGBT history in New Zealand
- LGBT rights in Niue
- LGBT rights in Tokelau
