= LGBTQ rights in New Zealand =

- New Zealand
- Legal status: Male legal since 1986, female always legal
- Gender identity: Transgender people allowed to change legal gender
- Military: Gay, lesbian, and bisexual people allowed to serve
- Discrimination protections: The Human Rights Act 1993 covers sexual orientation and implicitly covers gender

Family rights
- Recognition of relationships: Civil unions since 2005; Same-sex marriage since 2013
- Adoption: Full adoption rights since 2013

New Zealand lesbian, gay, bisexual, transgender, and queer (LGBTQ) rights are some of the most extensive in the world. The protection of LGBTQ rights is advanced, relative to other countries in Oceania, and among the most liberal in the world, with the country being the first in the region to legalise same-sex marriage.

Throughout the late 20th century, the rights of the LGBTQ community received more awareness and male same-sex sexual activity was decriminalised in 1986, with an age of consent of 16, equal to heterosexual intercourse. After recognising gender-neutral civil union since 2004, New Zealand legalised both same-sex marriage and adoption rights for same-sex couples in 2013. Discrimination regarding sexual orientation, and gender identity and expression has been banned since 1993. Gay, lesbian, and bisexual people have been allowed to serve openly in the military since 1993. Opinion polls have found that a majority of New Zealanders support same-sex marriage.

== Legality of same-sex sexual activity ==
Same-sex relationships and activities (Māori: takatāpui) were largely accepted amongst pre-colonial Māori society. There were no legal or social punishments for engaging in same-sex sexual activity. Male homosexual intercourse was first criminalised when New Zealand adopted England's law with the English Law Act 1858 and adopted British law making "buggery" a crime with a maximum sentence of death. (In practice, New Zealand used the death penalty only for offences of murder and once for treason before abolishment in 1961). In 1861, Britain replaced the death penalty for buggery with life imprisonment. New Zealand enacted similar legislation six years later. In 1893, the law in New Zealand was broadened to outlaw any sexual activity between men. Penalties included life imprisonment, hard labour and flogging. Sex between women has never been criminalised in New Zealand.

The Dorian Society (1962–88) was the first New Zealand organisation for homosexual men. The British Homosexual Law Reform Society provided legal assistance to the society. It drafted a petition calling for the decriminalisation of homosexual acts. Signed by 75 prominent citizens, a petition was presented to (and rejected by) Parliament in 1968.

In 1972, academic Ngahuia Te Awekotuku was denied a permit to visit the United States on the grounds that she was a homosexual. Publicity around the incident was a catalyst in the formation of gay liberation groups in Wellington, Christchurch and Auckland. The 1970s saw the growth of the modern feminist and gay movements in New Zealand.

MP Venn Young introduced a bill, entitled the Crimes Amendment Bill, in July 1974, which was the first bill to propose decriminalising homosexual acts between consenting adults. It was unsuccessful and was criticised by gay rights organisations for setting the age of consent at 21, as opposed to the age of 16 for heterosexual acts. Gay rights organisations refused to support bills which did not present an equal age of consent. A similar bill, introduced by MP Warren Freer in 1979, failed in its parliamentary reading in 1980, due to lack of support for the same reasons over the age disparity.

In 1985, Labour MP Fran Wilde consulted with gay rights groups to develop the Homosexual Law Reform Bill, which she introduced to Parliament on 8 March. It proposed removing the offence of consensual sex between males over the age of sixteen. Over the course of 14 months, the bill attracted organised opposition outside Parliament, including an anti-reform petition (which was rejected by Parliament). Inside Parliament, multiple attempts to set a higher age of consent at 20 or 18 were rejected; ironically, some opponents of decriminalisation of homosexuality joined supporters of full equality in voting against those proposals, as they believed that a higher age of consent for gay sex would have made the Bill more palatable to those on the fences. The bill passed its final reading on 9 July 1986, 49 votes in favour to 44 opposed. It achieved royal assent (becoming the Homosexual Law Reform Act 1986) on 11 July 1986, and it came into effect on 8 August that year.

Discrimination on the basis of sexual orientation was outlawed several years later by the Human Rights Act 1993. The Human Rights Act 1993 defines sexual orientation as "heterosexual, homosexual, lesbian, or bisexual orientations" in section 21(1)(m).

Discrimination on the basis of gender identity is impliedly outlawed, but this has not been tested by a court, resulting in uncertainty. In 2024, the Law Commission considered amending the Human Rights Act 1993 to cover transgender, non-binary and intersex people.

=== Expungement of convictions ===
Individuals convicted and imprisoned for homosexual offences prior to August 1986 were not automatically eligible to hide the offences under the Criminal Records (Clean Slate) Act 2004, since the Act applies retrospectively to current and abolished offences equally. However, individuals with an otherwise clean criminal record could apply to a District Court to have the conviction disregarded. However, this process only concealed these convictions – it did not erase them altogether.

On 28 June 2017, the Government introduced a bill which would allow men convicted for homosexual offences to apply to wipe out their convictions from the records. On 6 July, the bill had its first reading. Justice Minister Amy Adams moved a motion to apologise for convictions the same day, to which Parliament agreed unanimously. The bill was passed by Parliament on 3 April 2018 and received royal assent on 9 April 2018, becoming the Criminal Records (Expungement of Convictions for Historical Homosexual Offences) Act 2018, and going into effect the following day.

== Recognition of same-sex relationships ==
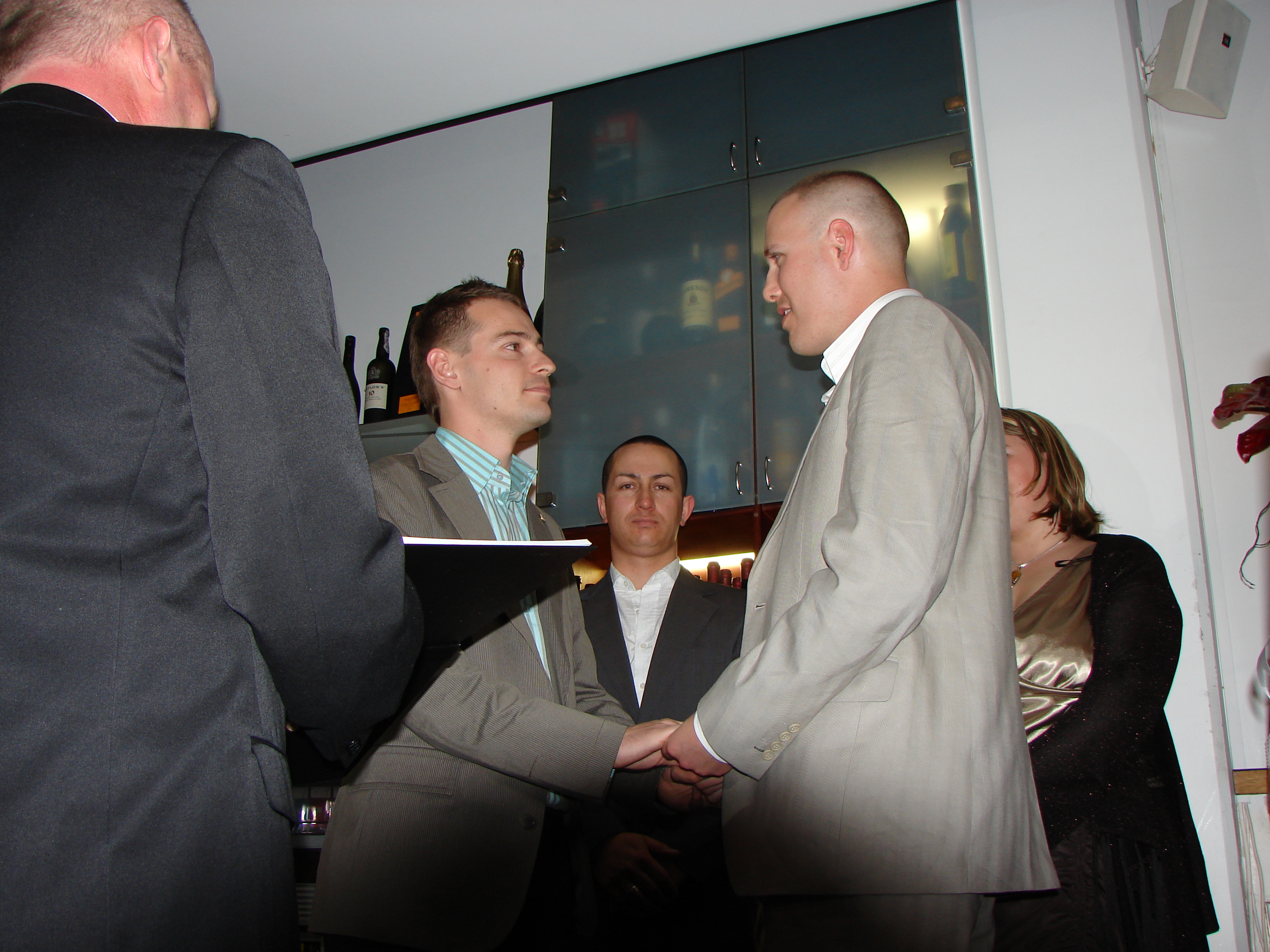
Same-sex civil union ceremony in Wellington, December 2006.

The Property (Relationships) Amendment Act 2001 gives de facto couples, whether opposite or same sex, the same property rights as existed since 1976 for married couples on the break-up of a relationship.

The Civil Union Act 2004 established the institution of civil union for both same-sex and opposite-sex couples. The Act is very similar to the Marriage Act 1955 with "marriage" replaced by "civil union". The following year, the Relationships (Statutory References) Act 2005 was passed to remove discriminatory provisions from most legislation.

=== Same-sex marriage ===
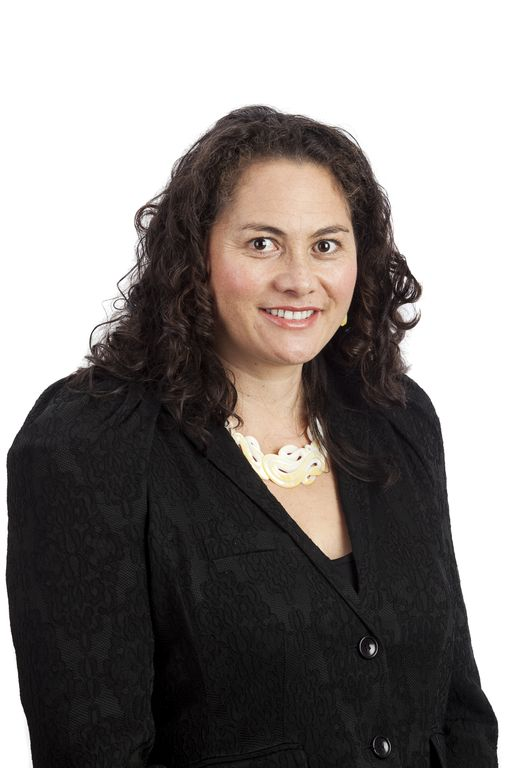
Labour MP Louisa Wall authored the bill which legalised same-sex marriage in New Zealand.

Same-sex marriage in New Zealand was refused judicial approval by the Court of Appeal after Quilter v Attorney-General in 1994. However, unlike Australia and much of the United States, New Zealand refused to pre-emptively ban same-sex marriage in case a future parliament decided to approve it with an amended marriage act. In December 2005, an abortive member's bill failed at its first reading to do so. Until a marriage bill was passed in April 2013, same-sex marriage and adoption were the final barrier before full LGBT formal and substantive equality in New Zealand.

In July 2012, a member's bill by Labour MP Louisa Wall which proposed defining marriage to be inclusive regardless of gender was drawn from the ballot. The Marriage (Definition of Marriage) Amendment Bill passed its first reading on 29 August 2012, 80 votes in favour to 40 opposed (with one abstention). Preliminary reports evidenced widespread support for same-sex marriage both within Parliament (notably from Prime Minister John Key) and amongst the general public, with polls conducted in May 2012 indicating 63% support. In December 2012, former Governor-General Dame Catherine Tizard starred in an online video campaign supporting same-sex marriage, alongside New Zealand singers Anika Moa, Boh Runga and Hollie Smith, as well as Olympian Danyon Loader. In a conscience vote, the bill passed its second and third readings by 77–44, and became law on 19 April 2013. However, same-sex marriages were not conducted until August, when the law went into effect.

== Adoption and parenting ==
There are no specific barriers preventing an LGBT individual from adopting children, except that a male individual cannot adopt a female child. The same-sex marriage law became effective from 19 August 2013, and since then married same-sex couples have been able to adopt children jointly. Unmarried couples of any sex and couples in a civil union can jointly adopt children following a New Zealand High Court ruling in December 2015. The court ruled that the ban breached the New Zealand Bill of Rights Act 1990. The minimum age to adopt in New Zealand is 20 years for a related child and 25 years or the child's age plus 20 years (whichever is greater) for an unrelated child.

On 21 May 2006, Green List MP Metiria Turei raised the issue of same-sex adoption, arguing that New Zealand's Adoption Act 1955 did not meet the complexities of contemporary New Zealand society. She argued following the enactment of civil unions in particular that eligible lesbian and gay prospective parents should be enabled to legally adopt.

Many lesbian couples are now raising children in New Zealand. Where these children are conceived through donor (sperm) insemination, both partners are recognised on the children's birth certificates (the birth mother as "mother", the other mother as "other parent"). This is following the Care of Children Act 2004, which repealed and replaced the Status of Children Act 1969. Fostering and guardianship are also recognised under New Zealand law and regulation, and reproductive technology has been accessible since 1994.

The donor is not recognised as a legal parent in New Zealand law. However, parents and donors can make formal agreements as to how things will work but the courts do have flexibility as to whether they recognise these agreements or not, under section 41 of the Care of Children Act 2004.

Lesbian women who have trouble conceiving using private donor insemination may be eligible, as other New Zealand women are, to help through publicly funded fertility treatment. However, there are conditions on this and every woman needing fertility treatment is scored as to her eligibility.

Now passed, the current Marriage (Definition of Marriage) Amendment Act 2013 enables eligible married same-sex parents to adopt children as there is a clause to that effect contained therein. However, known-relative adoptions in New Zealand have outnumbered stranger adoptions since the mid-1970s; between 2007 and 2013, there were 18 known-relative and stepchild adoptions for every 10 stranger adoptions.

Only men who do not have sperm are eligible for public funding to assisted reproduction, which means that most male same-sex couples must get private treatment.

== Discrimination protections ==
The Human Rights Act 1993 (Māori: Te Ture Tika Tangata 1993) outlaws discrimination on the grounds of sexual orientation and, implicitly, gender identity/expression. Initially, this law temporarily exempted government activities until 1999. In 1998, an amendment bill was introduced making this exemption permanent; this was abandoned following a change of government in 1999. The new Labour Government instead passed another amendment to apply the Act to government activities, and also to create a new ability for the courts to "declare" legislation inconsistent with the Act. Article 27(2) of the Act reads as follows:

Nothing in section 22 [which concerns employment matters] shall prevent different treatment based on sex, religious or ethical belief, disability, age, political opinion, or sexual orientation where the position is one of domestic employment in a private household.

Some examples of discrimination sometimes still occur. In January 2006, news headlines were made by a sperm bank's policy of refusing donations from gay men. In March 2006, the policy was amended. Reportedly, some heterosexual male sperm donors had vetoed the use of their gametes for lesbian couples who seek artificial insemination.

=== Military service ===
In New Zealand it has been legal for gay, lesbian, bisexual and transgender persons to serve in the military since New Zealand's Human Rights Act 1993 ended most forms of employment discrimination against lesbians, gay men and bisexuals. New Zealand military leaders did not oppose the end of military service discrimination. The Royal New Zealand Navy and the New Zealand Police are amongst many government agencies to have adopted "gay-friendly" policies.

== Hate crime laws ==
Section 9(1)(h) of the Sentencing Act 2002 makes it an aggravating factor in sentencing if a criminal offence constituted a hate crime, which includes sexual orientation and gender identity/expression. More recently, New Zealand's LGBT community was concerned about the continued existence of the provocation defence (sections 169 and 170 of the Crimes Act 1961) argument which they held had mitigated the seriousness of homophobic homicides through reducing probable, intentional murder convictions to the lesser charge and penalty of manslaughter (see "gay panic defence").

In 2009, the Crimes (Provocation Repeal) Amendment Act 2009 was enacted to repeal sections 169 and 170. The bill was introduced to Parliament in August 2009 by Justice Minister Simon Power, although its introduction was largely stemmed from the trial for the murder of Sophie Elliott by her ex-boyfriend, rather than the LGBT community. The repeal bill received wide parliamentary and public support, and passed its third reading on 26 November 2009, 116 votes to 5 with only ACT New Zealand opposed, and became effective on 8 December 2009.

== Gender identity and expression ==
Sex reassignment surgery is legal in New Zealand. An individual is permitted to change their name and legal gender on official documents, including birth certificates, if they can provide medical evidence that they have "acquired a physical conformation that accords with their gender identity". Originally, this was only available to individuals who had undergone genital-reconstruction surgery. However, in June 2008, the Family Court ruled that full sex reassignment surgeries are not always necessary to meet this legal threshold.

Sex reassignment surgeries take place largely in private hospitals or overseas. In the 1990s, New Zealand was dubbed a "world leader" for such operations, with comparatively low cost and relaxed public attitudes. In 2014, however, the country's only specialist surgeon retired, leaving transgender people seeking such operations in a state of limbo. Several chose to join the waiting list for publicly funded surgeries, which are limited to only four every two years (three for male to female, and one for female to male), or to go abroad. In October 2018, the Government announced its intention to increase the number of publicly funded operations. At that time, there were 111 people on the waiting list, meaning some had to wait up to 50 years.

The New Zealand Human Rights Commission noted in its 2004 report on the status of human rights in New Zealand that transgender and non-binary people in New Zealand face discrimination in several aspects of their lives, however, the law is unclear on the legal status of discrimination based on gender identity. Currently, the Human Rights Act 1993 does not explicitly prohibit discrimination on the basis of gender. Whilst it is believed that gender identity is protected under the laws preventing discrimination on the basis of either sex or sexual orientation, it is not known how this applies to those who have not had, or will not have, sex reassignment surgery. Some overseas courts have determined that transgender people are covered by prohibitions on discrimination based on sex, but there is also international case law suggesting it is not. Even if it is, it is unlikely to apply to transgender people who have not or will not have sex reassignment surgery. Likewise, placing gender identity under the prohibitions on the grounds of sexual orientation is problematic. While there is some inconsistent international case law, it has been noted that gender identification and sexual orientation are too unrelated for this to be suitable.

The International Commission of Jurists and the International Service for Human Rights in 2007 created the Yogyakarta Principles to apply international human rights law to gender identity and sexual orientation. The first and most arguably most important is that human rights are available to all humans, regardless of gender identity, and that states should amend legislation "to ensure its consistency with the universal enjoyment of all human rights."

This report suggested that transgender people were "one of the most marginalised groups" in New Zealand, leading the Human Rights Commission to publish a comprehensive inquiry entitled "To Be Who I Am" in 2008, which outlined some of the concerns listed below. These concerns are particularly important considering that discrimination and exclusion towards transgender, intersex and gender non-conforming persons has been shown to increase the risk of mental health issues and suicide.

On 10 August 2018, the Government Administration Select Committee discussed the Births, Deaths, Marriages, and Relationships Registration Bill, which was introduced on 10 August 2017 and would amend New Zealand laws relating to legal sex changes. The committee recommended allowing adults to change legal sex by submitting a statutory declaration saying they intend to continue to identify as a person of the chosen sex and understand the consequences of the application. No medical evidence would be required. Minors aged 16 and 17 would be able to do this with the consent of their guardian, confirmation from a health professional that they understand the consequences of the application and that the change is in their interests. The committee also recommended including gender options such as intersex and X (unspecified).

In November 2017, the New Zealand Parliament introduced the Births, Deaths, Marriages, and Relationships Registration Bill to allow people to change the sex on their birth certificates by statutory declaration, avoiding having to go through the Family Court or show evidence of medical treatment to change their sex. The Bill passed its third reading on 9 December 2021 and received the Royal Assent on 15 December 2021. It will make it easier for transgender and non-binary individuals to update gender details on birth certificates. This law comes into effect in 2023.

=== Healthcare ===
The use of gender-affirming care for transgender people is supported by The Professional Association for Transgender Health Aotearoa (PATHA), The Royal Australian and New Zealand College of Psychiatrists (RANZCP), The Australian and New Zealand Professional Association for Transgender Health (ANZPATH), the Society of Youth Health Professionals Aotearoa New Zealand (SYHPANZ), the New Zealand Sexual Health Society and the New Zealand Society of Endocrinology.

The first recorded use of puberty blockers began in 2011 after the first guidelines were published. 48 children received puberty blockers in 2011. A 2024 study found that New Zealand prescribed up to seven times more puberty blockers to transgender youth than England, Wales, Denmark and the Netherlands from 2014 to 2022, with 400 children receiving that treatment during that period. The study also showed that rates of prescribing puberty blockers in New Zealand had fallen slightly since 2022, but still remained high.

In September 2022, health advice stating that puberty blockers are safe and fully reversible was scrubbed from the Ministry of Health's webpage following backlash from anti-trans voices. Official correspondence from senior advisors within the MoH stated that the information was "no doubt true" but that the statement was removed regardless in order to create fewer queries from anti-trans campaigners.

In April 2024, the Ministry also refused to confirm or deny whether it would follow the British Government's move to restrict the use of puberty blockers following the controversial Cass Report. In November 2024, the Ministry of Health under New Zealand First and the ACT Party released an evidence brief on puberty blockers. The brief found there to be a lack of evidence for both the efficiency and harms of puberty blockers and recommended "a more precautionary approach". However, it also found that "the evidence published to date, while of low quality, all indicates the use of pubertal blockers is safe". The country did not ban puberty blockers and a doctor who provides the treatments in New Zealand said it "would not change the way in which he practiced".

On 19 November 2025, the Ministry of Health under New Zealand First and the ACT Party and led by Simeon Brown, announced a ban on puberty blockers for minors with gender dysphoria set to take effect on 19 December 2025. Minors with gender dysphoria already on puberty blockers will be able to continue them and the drug will also remain available for other uses like early onset puberty. Brown cited the Cass Review in his decision and said the ban will remain in place until the completion of the United Kingdom's clinical trial on puberty blockers. The ban was strongly condemned by the Royal Australian and New Zealand College of Psychiatrists (RANZCP), the Professional Association for Transgender Health Aotearoa (PATHA) and multiple other doctors in New Zealand. The ban was welcomed by right-wing political parties in New Zealand including the ruling New Zealand First and ACT party coalition, and was condemned by the opposition centre-left Labour Party as well as members of the Green Party. On 17 December 2025, the Wellington High Court granted an injunction preventing the ban from being enforced while a full judicial review is pending.

On 21 October 2026, the High Court ruled that the Government's 2025 regulations banning new puberty blocker prescriptions for children and young people with gender dysphoria were unlawful. The ruling was welcomed by PATHA president Jennifer Shields and vice president Dr Elizabeth McElrea, who said that moves to restrict transgender rights were "rooted in disinformation" and that decisions about this healthcare were best made by patients and their doctors. By contrast, Family First New Zealand chief executive Bob McCoskrie condemned the High Court and accused them of siding with activists over vulnerable children. Similarly, New Zealand First leader Winston Peters called on the Health Minister to appeal the High Court ruling. A spokesperson for the Health Minister said the Government was committed to introducing new safeguards for puberty blockers while ensuring that patients with medical needs could still access healthcare.

=== Sports ===
In late July 2025, Sport and Recreation Minister Mitchell ordered Sport NZ to scrap its transgender inclusive sports guidelines. The anti-transgender group Save Women's Sport Australasia had previously lobbied Mitchell's predecessor Bishop and New Zealand First leader Winston Peters into dropping the guidelines. The Labour Party's rainbow issues spokesperson Shanan Halbert described the scrapping of the transgender inclusive guidelines as a "step backwards" while the Green Party's rainbow issues spokesperson Benjamin Doyle said that the Sixth National Government had failed rainbow communities.

== Intersex rights ==
New Zealand laws and policies that prohibit female genital mutilation explicitly permit "normalising" medical interventions on intersex infants and girls. Material presented by the Australasian Paediatric Endocrine Group to the Australian Senate in 2013 showed New Zealand to be a regional outlier in surgeries in cases of congenital adrenal hyperplasia, with genital surgical interventions favoured on infant girls aged less than 6 months. In October 2016, the UN Committee on the Rights of the Child issued observations on practices in New Zealand, including recommendations to ensure "that no one is subjected to unnecessary medical or surgical treatment during infancy or childhood, guaranteeing the rights of children to bodily integrity, autonomy and self-determination". A 2016 intersex round table by the Human Rights Commission on genital "normalising" surgeries found that there was a lack of political will to address surgeries, and concerns with service delivery to parents and families, the development of legislative safeguards and a need to test the right to bodily autonomy against the New Zealand Bill of Rights Act 1990.

Since November 2011, New Zealand passports are available with an "X" sex descriptor. These were originally introduced for people transitioning gender. Birth certificates are available at birth showing "indeterminate" sex if it is not possible to assign a sex.

In March 2017, representatives of Intersex Trust Aotearoa New Zealand participated in an Australian and New Zealand consensus "Darlington Statement" by intersex community organisations and others. The statement calls for legal reform, including the criminalisation of deferrable intersex medical interventions on children, an end to legal classification of sex, protections from discrimination and harmful practices and improved access to peer support.

== Conversion therapy ==
Conversion therapy, the pseudoscientific practice of trying to change an individual's sexual orientation from homosexual or bisexual to heterosexual using psychological, physical, or spiritual interventions, is illegal in New Zealand, since 2022.

There is no reliable evidence that sexual orientation can be changed and medical institutions warn that conversion therapy practices are ineffective and potentially harmful.

In July 2018, Health Minister David Clark called conversion therapy "abhorrent". In August 2018, Justice Minister Andrew Little announced that a conversion therapy ban could be considered as part of a reform to the Human Rights Act 1993. The Green Party, the Human Rights Commission, the New Zealand Association of Counsellors and every medical organisation in New Zealand support banning the pseudoscientific practice. A petition to ban it was launched in mid-July, and had collected about 10,000 signatures within a week. In mid-August 2018, two petitions to ban conversion therapy were presented to Parliament, with a combined total of about 20,000 signatures. A bill to prohibit conversion therapy was introduced to Parliament in October 2018. It foresees 6–12 months imprisonment and a fine of between 5,000 and 10,000 New Zealand dollars for offenders.

In 2019 the Justice Select Committee reviewed petitions to ban conversion therapy. Prime Minister Jacinda Ardern expressed concerns about the impact conversion therapy could have on vulnerable youth, but said the committee would be "keeping in mind that there will be those who perceive that it's a part of their freedom of expression within their religion". In November 2019 the Justice Select Committee failed to recommend a ban, concluding: "we believe more work needs to be done before any decision is taken to ban it. In particular, thought must be given to how to define conversion therapy, who the ban would apply to, and how to ensure that rights relating to freedom of expression and religion were maintained".

Recent reports have shown that conversion therapy is "widespread" in New Zealand, including the practise of exorcism, therapy, drugs or other means. In a prominent 2016 review, six experts including J. Michael Bailey say there is little scientific evidence to support the efficacy of conversion therapy. The available lab studies which measured arousal responses of men who claimed to have changed their sexual orientation through such treatments still showed arousal responses to men, not women. While people may claim to have changed their orientation through such interventions often due to pressure or shame, their underlying orientation remains the same.

At the 9th New Zealand Youth Parliament, Youth MP Shaneel Lal advocated for a ban on conversion therapy in New Zealand. In late 2018, Lal co-founded the Conversion Therapy Action Group with local queer activists Shannon Novak, Harry Robson, Max Tweedie, and Neihana Waitai, to work towards ending conversion therapy. Lal worked with the Green Party of Aotearoa New Zealand to deliver a petition of over more than 150,000 signatures to ban conversion therapy.

In late July 2021, Justice Minister Kris Faafoi introduced the Conversion Practices Prohibition Legislation Bill, which seeks to ban conversion therapy in New Zealand. The bill creates two new criminal offences for either the most serious cases of harm or where there is heightened risk of harm. The proposed legislation makes it an offense to perform conversion therapy on anyone with a five years prison term. On 6 August 2021, the Bill passed its first reading with the support of all political parties except the opposition National Party, which wanted provisions protecting parents from prosecution. National's youth wing disagreed with their own party, supporting the legislation. The Justice Select Committee hearing submissions on the Bill received over a 100,000 submissions following Lal's online campaign, breaking the record for number of submissions.

In early February 2022, the National Party abandoned its bloc voting position on the Conversion Practices Prohibition Legislation Bill. The party's new leader Christopher Luxon allowed caucus members to vote on their conscience. The Bill passed its third and final reading on 15 February 2022, becoming law.

== Blood donation ==
The New Zealand Blood Service (NZBS), like many countries, controversially defers any man who has had oral or anal intercourse with another man, with or without protection, in the past three months from donating blood. (Before 14 December 2020, the deferral period was 12 months). The restriction is on the basis that men who have sex with men in New Zealand are 44 times more likely to be infected with HIV/AIDS than the general population, and the HIV testing used is not specific enough (up to 1 in 1000 failure rate) to guarantee a 100 percent HIV-free blood supply.

== Politics ==
Gay rights were a major political issue during the Homosexual Law Reform debates, but have subsequently become much less so. The Civil Union Act 2004 was opposed by nearly half of Parliament, but in tones much more restrained than that of the Homosexual Law Reform era. There has never been a specifically LGBT political party in New Zealand. There has been a succession of unsuccessful fundamentalist Christian political parties in New Zealand or socially conservative political parties less sympathetic to LGBT rights since the introduction of electoral reform in 1993 made proportional representation possible. The Destiny political party, founded to bring "Christian morality" into politics, received only 0.62% of the party vote in the 2005 general election. Christian Heritage New Zealand polled 4.4% as part of the Christian Coalition in 1996 but closed down in 2005 after its former leader Graham Capill was sentenced to nine years' imprisonment after multiple cases of sexual assault against three female children. Future New Zealand, the Kiwi Party, the aforementioned Destiny New Zealand and the Family Party all succeeded it, but none lasted long. Currently, the officially secular Conservative Party of New Zealand, which has yet to gain parliamentary representation, appeals to voters in this area.

A number of openly gay or lesbian politicians have served in New Zealand's Parliament. The first to be elected was Chris Carter, who became the first openly gay MP when he came out shortly after the 1993 election. He lost his seat in the 1996 election, but won it again in the 1999 election and became New Zealand's first openly gay cabinet minister in 2002. Carter united in civil union to his long-time partner of thirty-three years, Peter Kaiser, on 10 February 2007, in the first civil union for a cabinet minister or member of parliament since civil unions in New Zealand were introduced after legislation was passed in December 2004.

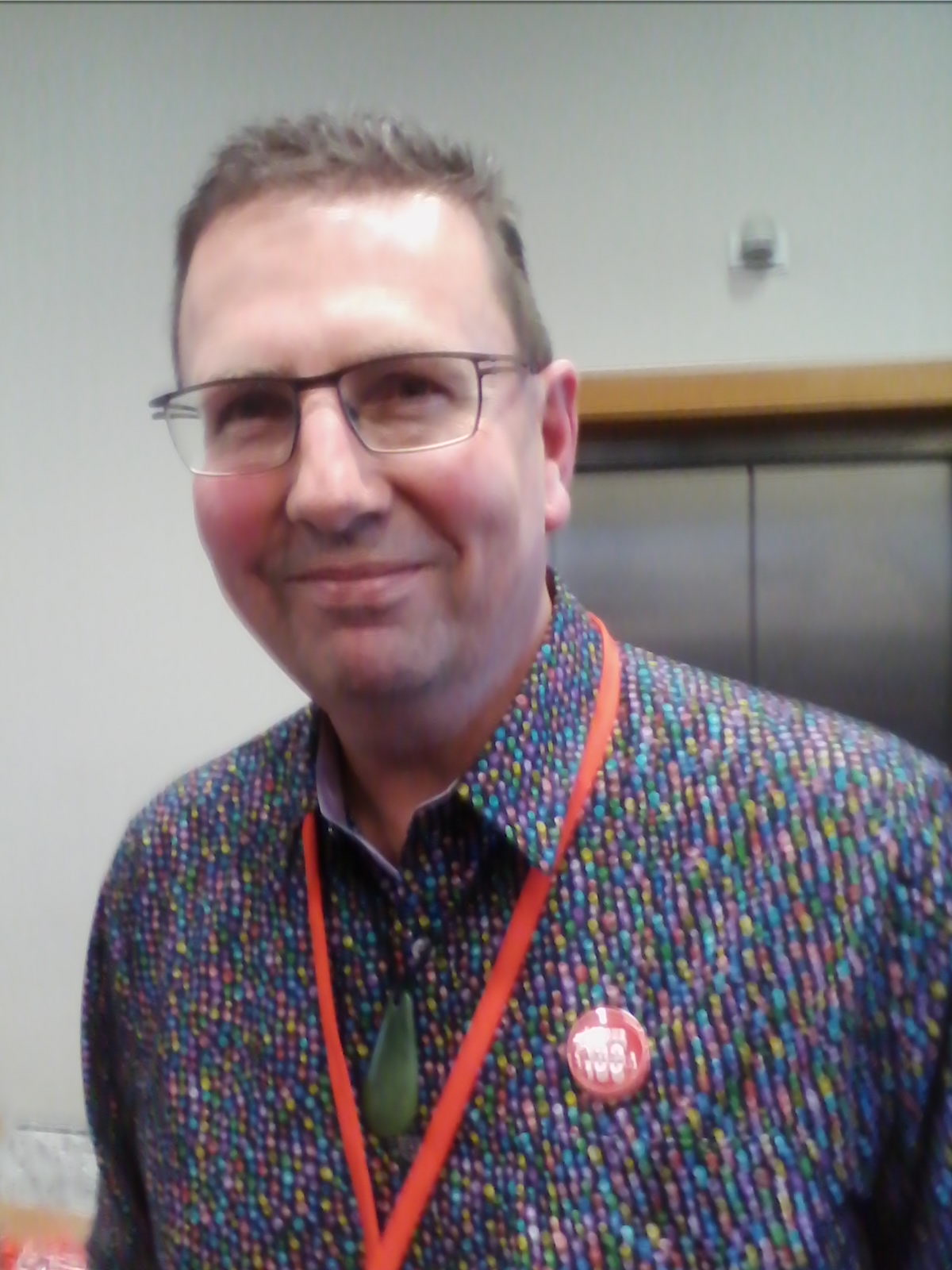
Tim Barnett was the first New Zealand MP to be elected as an openly gay man, in 1996.

Tim Barnett was the first MP to be elected as an openly gay man, in the 1996 election. In 1997, Barnett and Carter started Rainbow Labour as a branch of the Labour Party to represent LGBT people.

Maryan Street was New Zealand's first openly lesbian MP, elected in the 2005 election. She served until 2014, and served as Minister for ACC and Minister for Housing between 2007 and 2008. She was also the President of the Labour Party between 1993 and 1995. However, the National Party's Marilyn Waring had preceded Street, and while she was outed at one point, Waring's strong pro-choice identification and vocal feminism overshadowed her lesbianism, which was then considered a private matter. Since she left Parliament in 1984, Waring has more openly acknowledged her sexual orientation. Chris Finlayson became the first openly gay National Party MP elected to Parliament on his party's MMP party list in the 2005 election. Finlayson was an MP between 2005 and 2019, and a former Minister for Treaty of Waitangi Negotiations between 2008 and 2017, and Minister for Arts, Culture and Heritage between 2008 and 2014, and served as Attorney-General from 2008 to 2017.

Current openly gay MPs include Grant Robertson, former Deputy Leader of the Labour Party between 2011 and 2013 and Minister of Finance and Minister for Sport and Recreation since 2017 and Minister Responsible for the Earthquake Commission since 2019, Labour MP Tāmati Coffey, Labour MP Louisa Wall, Green Party MP Chlöe Swarbrick, and Green Party MP and Parliamentary Under-Secretary for Justice Jan Logie.

Charles Chauvel joined Grant Robertson as a gay Labour MP from 2006 to 2013. Darren Hughes resigned from the Labour Party caucus in 2011, and National MP Claudette Hauiti served in Parliament between 2013 and 2014. National MP Paul Foster-Bell, who served in Parliament from 2013 to 2017, came out as gay in 2016. Kevin Hague of the Green Party served as an MP between 2008 and 2016.

Georgina Beyer became the first transgender mayor in the world when she became the Mayor of Carterton in 1995. In the 1999 election, she became the world's first transgender MP. She retired from parliamentary politics on 14 February 2007.

After the 2020 general election, 10% of the elected MPs openly identified as LGBT+, giving New Zealand the highest proportion of 'out' elected representatives in the world.

After the 2023 general election, Only 5 MPs who publicly identify as LGBTQIA+ were elected, 2 each from Labour and the Greens and 1 from ACT. This is down from a record 12 (10%) elected in the 2020 election.

== Living conditions ==
New Zealand is frequently referred to as one of the most LGBT-friendly countries in the world. New Zealand has a visible and open LGBT scene, though small by international standards. Auckland has multiple gay bars, restaurants, clubs, festivals and other venues. Outside Auckland, there are also visible, albeit smaller, LGBT scenes in Wellington, Tauranga, Christchurch, Dunedin, and Hamilton. Several organisations and publications in New Zealand cater to LGBT people.

=== Pride events ===
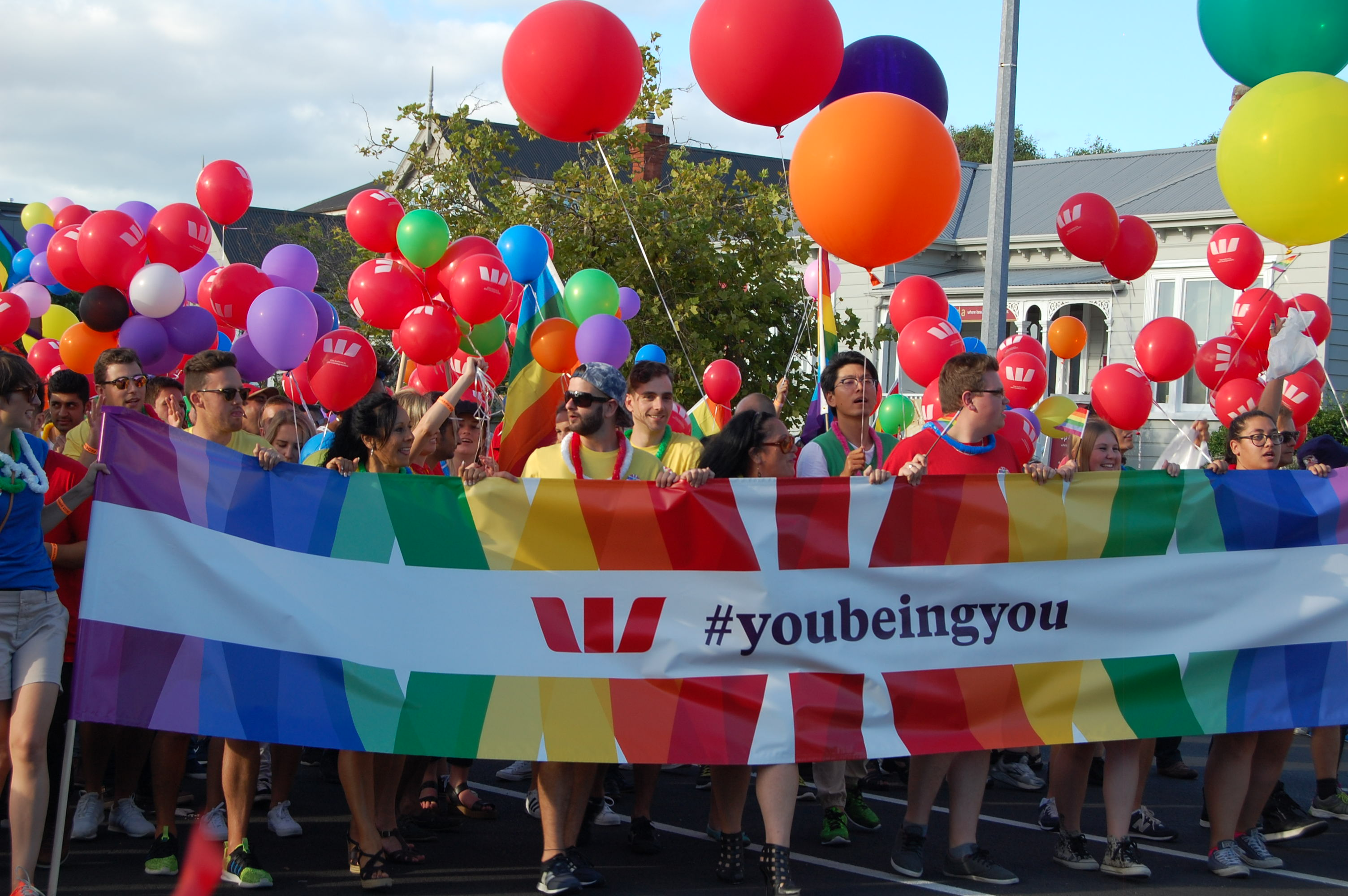
Participants at the Auckland Pride Festival in 2016

Gay pride events are legal in New Zealand and were first held in the 1970s. The Hero Parade, the showpiece of the Hero Festival in Auckland, was held annually between 1992 and 2001. Parades were typically attended by more than one hundred thousand people (and at its height, by as many as two hundred thousand). Pride runs every February in Auckland including a march led by Auckland Pride Festival, and a parade led by Rainbow Pride Auckland.

Another event is the Big Gay Out, a family event held annually in Auckland at Pt Chevalier's Coyle Park. The numbers of attendees has risen steadily over the past few years and includes appearances from the Prime Minister, the Leader of the Opposition and many other politicians from centre-left and centre-right parties alike, who show their support for the LGBT community.

=== Demographics ===
As per the 2023 Census, LGBTIQ+ or rainbow population, stood at 144,960 accounting for 4.9% of the New Zealand's population. Among this 54% identified as bisexual, about 30% identified as gay or lesbian, and the remaining 13% as others. In the same census, 26,097 people identified as transgender (0.7 percent of the census usually resident population aged 15 years and over who provided the information to derive cisgender and transgender status) and 15,039 people (0.4 percent of the census usually resident population aged 15 years and over who responded) stated they knew they were born with a variation of sex characteristics. The highest proportion of people belonging to the rainbow communities is Wellington at 11.3%, followed by Dunedin at 7.3%, Christchurch at 6%, Palmerston North at 5.8%, Hamilton at 5.6% and with Auckland at 4.9%.

== In Tokelau, Niue and the Cook Islands ==
Although anti-discrimination laws and laws regarding civil union and same-sex marriage apply in New Zealand, these do not apply in Niue, Tokelau or the Cook Islands due to their separate legislatures. (Note: Tokelau is a dependent territory. The Cook Islands and Niue are self-governing states that are freely associated with New Zealand. New Zealand law does not apply to these states. See also: Political status of the Cook Islands and Niue.)

In Tokelau, same sex activity became legal in 2003. The Cook Islands repealed provisions criminalising male homosexuality in 2023. Niue legalised same sex activity in 2024.

== Summary table ==
Same-sex sexual activity	Yes (Male since 1986; female always legal)
Equal age of consent (16)	Yes (Since 1986/2005 (Note: Although the Homosexual Law Reform Act 1986 set an equal age of consent for sexual activity at 16, a legal oversight meant that the Crimes Act at the time did not explicitly prohibit a male under 16 from consenting to sex with a female. The Crimes Amendment Act 2005 closed this loophole by making all sexual offences gender-neutral, ensuring the age of consent applied equally regardless of gender.))
Anti-discrimination laws in employment	Yes (Since 1993)
Anti-discrimination laws in the provision of goods and services	Yes (Since 1993)
Anti-discrimination laws in all other areas (incl. indirect discrimination, hate speech)	Yes (Since 1993)
Hate crime laws covering both sexual orientation and gender identity	Yes (Since 2002)
Recognition of same-sex couples	Yes (Since 2002)
Same-sex marriage	Yes (Since 2013)
Same-sex civil union	Yes (Since 2005)
Stepchild adoption by same-sex couples	Yes (Since 2013)
Joint adoption by same-sex couples	Yes (Since 2013)
LGBT people allowed to serve in the military	Yes (Since 1993)
Right to change legal gender	Yes (Since 1993)
Third gender option	Yes (Since 2009)
Gender self-identification	Yes (Since 2023)
Legal recognition of non-binary gender	Yes (Since at least 2023) (Note: Self-identification of non-binary gender has been available since 2023.)
Access to IVF for lesbian couples	Yes (Since 2004)
Intersex minors protected from invasive surgical procedures	No
Sexual orientation/gender identity for asylum recognition	Yes
Conversion therapy banned	Yes (Since 2022)
Commercial surrogacy for gay male couples	Yes / No (Only altruistic surrogacy is legal, commercial surrogacy is banned regardless of sexual orientation)
Gay criminal records expunged	No (Since 2018)
MSMs allowed to donate blood	Yes (Since 2020, deferral period of 3 months)

== See also ==
- LGBTQ in New Zealand
- LGBTQ rights in Tokelau
- LGBTQ rights in Niue
- LGBTQ rights in the Cook Islands
- LGBTQ rights in Oceania
- Same-sex marriage in New Zealand
- Intersex rights in New Zealand
- Transgender rights in New Zealand
- Human rights in New Zealand

== Bibliography ==
- Drescher, Jack; Zucker, Kenneth, eds. (2006). Ex-Gay Research: Analyzing the Spitzer Study and Its Relation to Science, Religion, Politics, and Culture. New York: Harrington Park Press. ISBN 978-1-56023-557-6.
- Ford, Jeffry G. (2001), "Healing homosexuals: A psychologist's journey through the ex-gay movement and the pseudo-science of reparative therapy", Journal of Gay & Lesbian Psychotherapy, 5 (3–4): 69–86, doi:10.1300/J236v05n03_06, S2CID 144717094
- Glassgold, JM; et al. (2009), Report of the American Psychological Association Task Force on Appropriate Therapeutic Responses to Sexual Orientation (PDF), American Psychological Association
- Haldeman, Douglas C. (1991), "Sexual orientation conversion therapy for gay men and lesbians: A scientific examination" ( (PDF)), in Gonsiorek, John; Weinrich, James (eds.), Homosexuality: Research Implications for Public Policy, Newbury Park, California: Sage Publications, Inc, ISBN 978-0-8039-3764-2, archived from the original on 6 February 2018
- Philip Webb et al.: Butterworths Family Law in New Zealand: (13th Edition): Wellington: Lexis/Nexis: 2007.
- New Zealand Law Commission: Adoption: Options for Reform: Wellington: New Zealand Law Commission Preliminary Paper No 38: 1999: ISBN 1-877187-44-5
- Solicitor General's opinion on the application of the Human Rights Act 1993 to transgender people
- Human Rights Commission: To Be Who I Am: Report of the Inquiry into Discrimination Experienced by Transgender People. January 2008
- Counties Manukau District Health Board Gender Reassignment Health Services for Trans People Within New Zealand: Good Practice Guide for Health Professionals 2012
- Department of Labour: Transgender People at Work. June 2011
- World Professional Association for Transgender Health: Standards of Care for the Health of Transgender, and Gender-Nonconforming People 7th Version, 2012
- Human Rights Act 1993
- Sex-change Surgery Delay Hits Youth Ben Heather, 16 April 2015.
- Youth’12: Fact Sheet about Transgender Young People from Clark, T. C., Lucassen, M. F. G., Bullen, P., Denny, S. J., Fleming, T. M., Robinson, E. M., & Rossen, F. V. (2014). The health and well-being of transgender high school students: Results from the New Zealand Adolescent Health Survey (Youth’12). Journal of Adolescent Health
- Births, Deaths, Marriages and Relationships Registration Act 1995
- Heike Polster, "Gender Identity as a New Prohibited Ground of Discrimination" New Zealand Journal of Public and International Law. Vol 1 No 1 November 2003
- The Yogyakarta Principles: Principles on the Application of International Human Rights Law in Relation to Sexual Orientation and Gender Identity. 2007
- Hansard, First Reading on Statutes Amendment Bill (No 4) 16 April 2014
- Human Rights Commission: Human Rights in New Zealand Today – New Zealand Action Plan for Human Rights. August 2004
