= NZAC =

NZAC may refer to:

- New Zealand Alpine Club
- New Zealand Arthropod Collection
- New Zealand Association of Counsellors
