= Pride celebrations in New Zealand =

LGBTQ+ pride is celebrated in New Zealand largely throughout February and March, as well as during the worldwide Pride Month in June. In addition to local New Zealand also celebrates global observances such as International Transgender Day of Visibility and Lesbian Visibility Week.

== National pride celebrations ==
The anniversary of the 1986 Homosexual Law Reform Act is observed on 9 July, and the anniversary of same-sex marriage in New Zealand is observed on 19 August. The annual Sweat with Pride fundraiser event is held in June. GiveOUT Day is a nationwide day of fundraising for LGBTQ+ organisations held each October.

== By location ==
=== Auckland ===
The annual Auckland Pride Festival and Auckland Rainbow Parade are held in February, as is the Big Gay Out festival.

=== Christchurch ===
Christchurch Pride takes place throughout March. Festivities include a Rainbow Ride biking fundraiser, an interfaith Pride Service, and a closing picnic.

=== Dunedin ===
Dunedin Pride Month takes place each March.

=== Hamilton ===
In Hamilton, Pride Week takes place each April, culminating with a Pride in the Park picnic.

=== Marlborough ===
The Pride Wairau Festival takes place in June. In 2025, the festival's Pride rally was disrupted by Destiny Church demonstrators.

=== Nelson ===
The Whakatū Pride Festival is held annually in April.

=== Paekākāriki ===
Paekākāriki has annual pride festivals in October, which includes a self-proclaimed world's shortest pride parade.

=== Palmerston North ===
The annual Palmy Drag Fest takes place in October, accompanied by a Rainbow Fair of vendors and performers.

=== Queenstown ===
The annual Winter Pride Festival takes place each August in Queenstown. In 2026, Winter Pride organisers announced a hiatus, but stated intentions to resume the festival in 2027.

=== Rotorua ===
The Rotorua Chamber of Pride hosts Matariki Pride events in June.

=== Taranaki ===
Pride Taranaki Pride Week is held annually in April.

=== Tauranga ===
The city of Tauranga observes Pride Month in April.

=== Wellington ===
Wellington Pride Festival originated with the 1986 Newtown Lesbian and Gay Fair, organized to support the Homosexual Law Reform Act. The Wellington International Pride Parade branched off as an independent organisation in 2017.

=== Whangārei ===
Whangārei Pride Festival events are held throughout March.

=== Whanganui ===
Whanganui observes Pride Week in June.
