= Auckland Pride =

Auckland Pride may refer to:

- Auckland Pride Festival
- Auckland rugby league team, who were known as the Auckland Pride in 2011 and 2012.
