= Homosexual Law Reform Act 1986 =

1986 New Zealand law decriminalising consensual gay sex

New Zealand Parliament
- Long title: An Act to amend the Crimes Act 1961 by removing criminal sanctions against consensual sexual conduct between males, and consensual heterosexual anal intercourse, while protecting minors.
- Citation: 1986 No 33
- Passed by: House of Representatives
- Passed: 9 July 1986
- Royal assent: 11 July 1986
- Commenced: 8 August 1986
- Administered by: Ministry of Justice

Legislative history
- Bill title: Homosexual Law Reform Bill
- Introduced by: Fran Wilde
- Introduced: 7 March 1985
- First reading: 8 March 1985
- Second reading: 13 November 1985
- Third reading: 9 July 1986
- Committee report: 8 October 1985

Related legislation
- Human Rights Act 1993 (New Zealand)
- Status: Current legislation

The Homosexual Law Reform Act 1986 is a New Zealand act of Parliament that broadly legalised consensual sexual practices between men as well as consensual anal sex regardless of partners' gender. It removed the provisions of the Crimes Act 1961 that criminalised this behaviour. The legislation established a uniform age of consent, setting it at 16 for both same-sex and opposite-sex partners.

Before Homosexual Law Reform, male homosexual acts had faced severe legal penalties in New Zealand, evolving from capital punishment to life imprisonment and hard labour. Despite initial attempts at decriminalisation in the 1970s, it was not until the landmark 1986 Act that consensual same-sex activities were decriminalised, marking a significant progressive shift in the country's approach to LGBT rights.

== Background ==
Buggery or sodomy became illegal in New Zealand when the country became part of the British Empire in 1840 and adopted English law making male homosexual acts punishable by death. The Offences against the Person Act 1867 (No. 66) changed the penalty for buggery from execution to life imprisonment. In 1893 the law was broadened so that all sex between men constituted sexual assault even if it was consensual. Penalties included life imprisonment, hard labour and flogging. Sexual practices between women have never been legally prohibited in New Zealand, but all anal intercourse, including heterosexual, continued to be prior to the 1986 Act.

In 1961 the penalties for male homosexual activity were reduced, reflecting changing attitudes towards homosexuality. Shortly afterward the Dorian Society and later the Wolfenden Association were formed to campaign for legalisation of male homosexual sex. In 1968 a petition signed by 75 prominent citizens and calling for legislative change was presented to (and rejected by) Parliament.

The first parliamentary attempt at decriminalisation was made in 1974, with National MP Venn Young's Crimes Amendment Bill. This would have legalised sexual activity between men over the age of 21, but was defeated 34 to 29, with 24 abstentions. Warren Freer proposed similar legislation in 1979 and 1980 but this did not receive support from gay activist groups, who felt that a different age of consent for gay and straight sex would perpetuate discrimination and homophobia.

The debate for the 1986 bill lasted 16 months. Arguments brought by the opposition was that the bill would "ruin families" and spread AIDS. A petition and protest was held in 1985 by the Coalition of Concerned Citizens, which claimed to have received 800,000 signatures. Many of the signatures, however, were discredited by Parliament.

== Legislative history ==
The bill which would have become this act was introduced by Labour MP Fran Wilde in 1985. The bill originally was composed of two parts: Part I, which removed criminal penalties for those engaging in male homosexual acts and anal intercourse, provided it was consensual between people over the age of 16 (which was the age of consent for vaginal sex in New Zealand); and Part II, which provided anti-discrimination protections for lesbians and gay men.

=== Committee stage ===
During consideration of the bill by the Committee of the Whole, two amendments concerning the age of consent for male homosexual activities (one setting set such an age at 20, and another setting it at 18) were rejected. Ironically, the staunchest opponents of the bill (who wanted homosexuality to remain illegal for people of all ages) voted against a higher age of consent: they thought that, by preventing the passage of a "compromise" amendment, they would have ultimately prevented the passage of the bill altogether, as they believed "nobody in their right mind would vote for a third reading for the bill with the age of consent at 16".

The committee also decided, by a majority of 18 (31 Ayes to 49 Noes), to remove Part II from the bill.

=== Passage ===
The bill, as amended, passed narrowly (49 Ayes to 44 Noes) on 9 July 1986, after an attempt by opponents to invoke closure and end debate had been defeated on 2 July by one vote (41 Ayes to 42 Noes); the bill might have failed if a vote had been taken then as several supporters were kept away from Wellington by bad weather. Three National MPs voted for the bill, and other National MPs (including Doug Graham) would have supported the bill if it had been in danger of defeat.

Homosexual Law Reform Act 1986 – Third Reading^{a}
Party	Voted for	Voted against	Present (Speaker)	Absent
Labour (55)	46: Jim Anderton; Margaret Austin; Michael Bassett; Mary Batchelor; Reg Boorman; Kerry Burke; David Butcher; David Caygill; Helen Clark; Michael Cullen; Trevor de Cleene; bill Dillon; Roger Douglas; Peter Dunne; Jack Elder; Anne Fraser; Fred Gerbic; Phil Goff; Bruce Gregory; Ann Hercus; Jonathan Hunt; Eddie Isbey; Bill Jeffries; Judy Keall; Annette King; David Lange; Trevor Mallard; Russell Marshall; Clive Matthewson; Ralph Maxwell; Mike Moore; Colin Moyle; Peter Neilson; Richard Northey; Frank O'Flynn; Geoffrey Palmer; Richard Prebble; Noel Scott; Margaret Shields; Ken Shirley; Bill Sutton; Jim Sutton; Bob Tizard; Koro Wetere; Fran Wilde; Philip Woollaston	7: Fraser Colman; Stan Rodger; Peter Tapsell; John Terris; Whetu Tirikatene-Sullivan; Allan Wallbank; Trevor Young	1: Gerard Wall	1: Geoff Braybrooke
National (38)	3: George Gair; Ian McLean; Katherine O'Regan	35: Derek Angus; Neill Austin; Rex Austin; John Banks; Bill Birch; Jim Bolger; Philip Burdon; Warren Cooper; Michael Cox; Paul East; John Falloon; Tony Friedlander; Jim Gerard; Doug Graham; Robin Gray; Norman Jones; Doug Kidd; Graeme Lee; Jack Luxton; Denis Marshall; Roger Maxwell; Roger McClay; Don McKinnon; Jim McLay; Maurice McTigue^{b}; Robert Muldoon; Winston Peters; Ruth Richardson; Lockwood Smith; Rob Storey; Rob Talbot; Bruce Townshend; Simon Upton; Merv Wellington; Venn Young	-	-
Social Credit (2)	-	2: Gary Knapp^{c}; Neil Morrison^{c}	-	-
Totals	49	44	1	1

a. Political Affiliation of each MP is based on the information from the prior election. The following MPs (who were originally from one of the two main parties) would eventually join or find their own political parties are:
- Jim Anderton (Progressive Party) – Labour;
- John Banks (ACT New Zealand) – National;
- Peter Dunne (United Future) – Labour;
- Winston Peters (New Zealand First) – National;
- Richard Prebble (ACT New Zealand) – Labour;
- Ken Shirley (ACT New Zealand) – Labour
b. National MP Maurice McTigue succeeded the late Labour MP Basil Arthur in a 1985 by-election.
c. Both of these MPs were incorrectly labelled as affiliated with the Labour Party (NZ).

=== Aftermath ===
Although Part II did not make it into the final version of the bill, its provisions were eventually enacted into law seven years later by the New Zealand Human Rights Act 1993. Full equality to LGBT+ New Zealanders was finally granted on 17 April 2013, when by 77 votes to 44 same-sex marriage in New Zealand was legalised, receiving royal assent on 19 April. It entered into force on 19 August the same year.

On 10 April 2018, the Criminal Records (Expungement of Convictions for Historical Homosexual Offences) Act 2018 came into effect, joining a range of similar statutes in other countries that pardoned or expunged convictions for homosexual offences prior to decriminalisation.

== Debate ==
The bill was subject to substantial debate and faced fierce opposition from the Salvation Army, as well as Christian political activists such as Keith Hay, Peter Tait and politicians such as Norman Jones (National MP for Invercargill). A Coalition of Concerned Citizens was created by the group to distribute a petition against the Act, that on submission to Parliament was claimed to have garnered more than 800,000 signatures, making it the largest petition in proportion to New Zealand's population up to that point. However, some petition sheets contained several signatures in the same handwriting, and some of the boxes were nearly empty, thereby discrediting the petition and causing the Parliamentary Petitions Committee to reject it.

Despite the Coalition of Concerned Citizens threatening electoral reprisals, the Fourth Labour Government was re-elected for a second term of office, losing only one constituency seat to the National Party Opposition in 1987.

In accordance with surveys conducted amongst its membership, the Salvation Army continued to oppose law reform, including same-sex marriage in New Zealand, but later expressed regret for the hurt that its participation in the petition had caused. In a joint statement written in 2012, attempts at rapprochement were welcomed by the Rainbow Wellington LGBT+ group.

When National MP Lockwood Smith gave his valedictory speech in February 2013 after 30 years in Parliament, he listed voting against the Homosexual Law Reform Bill in 1986 as his biggest regret:

I faced the classic dilemma of voting according to my own judgement or the opinion of those I was elected to represent. As a new member, I opted for the latter and I've always regretted it.

== See also ==
- LGBT people in New Zealand
- LGBT rights in New Zealand

== Bibliography ==
- Laurie Guy: Worlds in Collision: The Gay Law Reform Debate in New Zealand: 1960–1986 Wellington: Victoria University Press: 2002: ISBN 0-86473-438-7
- Laurie Guy: "Evangelicals and the Homosexual Law Reform Debate: 1984-5" Stimulus 13:4 (November 2005): 69–77.
- History Group, Out and About: Homosexual Law Reform in New Zealand, .
