= Arielle Keil =

Filipino-New Zealand Beauty Queen

- Born: February 26, 1994 (age 32); Davao City
- Education: AUT University
- Occupation: Model
- Height: 171 cm (5 ft 7 in)

Arielle Keil (Davao, Philippines, 1994s) is a New Zealand model of Filipino descent. She made history in 2020 when she was the first transgender woman to compete in Miss New Zealand where she was crowned Miss Intercontinental New Zealand

== Early life and education ==
Keil was born in Davao, Philippines and grew up in West Auckland, New Zealand. At birth she was assigned a male gender that did not match her true gender identity and was named Andrew. She moved to New Zealand in 1998. She attended Massey High School and completed a Bachelor of Design majoring in Fashion Design from the AUT University in 2015. She is currently studying communications at AUT University.

== Personal life ==
In 2017, Keil began gender transition and embraced the female gender. However, it was not an easy path. In fact, the family disowned her and kicked her out of home for making the gender transition.

In early 2020, she underwent sex reassignment surgery.

== Awards ==
- Miss Intercontinental New Zealand 2020
