= G.F. Laundon =

New Zealand-based mycologist and plant pathologist (1938–1984)

Gillian Fiona Laundon
- Born: Geoffry Frank Laundon; 7 May 1938; Kettering, England
- Died: 8 February 1984 (aged 45); Levin, New Zealand
- Education: BSc
- Alma mater: University of Sheffield
- Spouse: Margaret Keay Cox
- Children: 3
- Scientific career
- Fields: Mycology, taxonomy, plant pathology
- Author abbrev. (botany): G.F. Laundon

Gillian Fiona Laundon (7 May 1938 – 8 February 1984), also known as Gillian Cox, was a New Zealand-based mycologist with a focus on plant pathology and taxonomy, and a trans activist.

== Life and career ==
Born Geoffry Frank Laundon on 7 May 1938 in Kettering, England to parents Frank and Marjorie, Laundon was educated at the University of Sheffield, receiving a B.Sc. honours degree (second class, 1st division) in Botany in 1959. Later in 1959 she became an assistant mycologist (later mycologist) at the Commonwealth Mycological Institute and specialised on rust fungi. In 1963 she married Margaret Keay Cox, and over the next several years had three children with her. In 1965 she emigrated to New Zealand and became mycologist at the Plant Health & Diagnostic Station at Levin, New Zealand and continued to research the taxonomy and nomenclature of rusts.

== Scientific contribution ==
Laundon specialised on rust fungi (Urediniomycetes), first publishing new species in 1963. Among her most important contributions was a new system of spore terminology published in 1967, which was controversial at the time but was generally accepted by the time of her death. Laundon was an active member of the International Association for Plant Taxonomy and was on the Special Committee for Fungi and Lichens for a number of years, served on four international committees dealing with fungus nomenclature, and was invited to investigate the nomenclature of rust genera and write a chapter for Index Nominum Genericorum. Laundon was the first to realise there were two species involved when the poplar rusts were first found in New Zealand in 1972, a claim not verified until samples of the spores were examined with an electron microscope. She made significant contributions to the known plant pathogens in New Zealand, publishing many first reports of fungal diseases.

Laundon's interests were broader than just mycology. She designed and built a light meter that could be used for taking photographs through a microscope, and light incubators for a mycology laboratory, as well as learning to programme computers.

Over her career she collected at least 211 specimens and identified 539 that are in formal herbaria or culture collections. She also had the species Phoma laundoniae named in her honour.

== Trans Activism ==
Laundon was an early member of "Hedesthia," one of the first recorded trans organisations in New Zealand (founded 1972). She was an active member, often writing into Hedesthia's newsletter, initially called S-E-L-F and later Trans-Scribe. In an article written in 1976, Laundon explained how internalised queerphobia - which she defines as the "fairly common belief that intersexuals, transsexuals, transvestites, fetishists and homosexuals are all one and the same thing, and are all 'disgusting'" - often caused trans people to isolate themselves. She emphasised the importance of trans friendships:

Simply to meet others and see just how normal and decent they really are, and to see what they have achieved in bringing out their real selves, can be a revelation, and this can help towards self-acceptance, which, if you think about it, may be YOUR greatest problem.

Laundon also underlined the lengths Hedesthia went to, to preserve their members' privacy - this included an extensive vetting process.

=== TransFormation ===
Hedesthia was primarily a social organisation, and Laundon felt that there was a need for a "bureau of information" specifically geared towards supporting transsexuals. Working under the name Gillian Cox, Laundon and her wife Margaret Cox founded "TransFormation," in 1976.

TransFormation and Hedesthia worked closely alongside one another, sharing information and resources, as well as teaming up to send publicity and form relationships with a variety of organisations across the country, including gay activist and social groups, public libraries, universities, and various community support organisations. Laundon and Cox were encouraged by a grant of $50 from the Mental Health Foundation in 1977, which while not a large sum, provided the "first 'Official' recognition of the integrity of our service."

Cox passed her TransFormation duties on to the rest of the Hedesthia collective in 1980. When she died in 1984, her obituary in Trans-Scribe noted she would be sadly missed by many:

Her work in the field of Transsexualism was well respected throughout the world and the many letters that we receive annually attest to the esteem in which she is held by the numerous Transsexuals to whom she offered comfort and advice through her leaflets and correspondence.

=== Coming Out ===
In 1977, in a highly unusual step at the time, Laundon publicly announced her gender transition in a scientific journal, taking the name Gillian Fiona Laundon, while still continuing with her research. Throughout this transition she had the support of her wife and their children and colleagues.

Laundon was working as a public servant during this time, and with support from the Public Services Association (PSA), she successfully lobbied the State Services Commission (SSC) for access to all women's bathrooms in her department. Although a minority of her coworkers opposed this, she generally enjoyed "tremendous support." By 1978 she had won her case, however the SSC did not implement any guidelines, and discrimination was still rife in the public service. Writing in the PSA's Public Service Journal, Laundon expressed dismay that another colleague should be subjected to a vote by her colleagues over whether she should be able to use the women's toilets:

No doubt her colleagues will say 'what about our rights?' But how does a transexual's use of the female facilities threaten them in any significant way. They on the other hand threaten her sanity, and perhaps even her very life through their attitudes towards her.

Laundon sought to educate her colleagues about the prejudice trans people faced, and implored them to show compassion.
