= Dorian Society =

New Zealand society for gay men

The Dorian Society (1962–1988) was the first New Zealand organisation for homosexual men. It was founded on 27 May 1962 by a group of men including Cees Kooge, John McKay, Brett Rawnsley, and Claude Tanner, the latter of whom would be elected the Society's first President-Chairman. It was primarily a social club that avoided political action. In 1963, it took the first steps towards law reform by forming a legal subcommittee that collected books and other resources. It also provided legal advice to its members. By 1967 it sought advice from the English Homosexual Law Reform Society and Albany Trust on the legislative changes occurring there. This led to a New Zealand society dedicated to law reform. Its first project was a petition, signed by 75 prominent citizens, that was presented to (and rejected by) Parliament in 1968.

== The Wolfenden Association ==
About 150 people attended a public meeting in Wellington on 17 April 1967 to form a society to work for homosexual law reform. It called itself the Wolfenden Association after Baron John Wolfenden whose eponymous 1957 report had recommended decriminalisation of homosexuality in the United Kingdom, but it soon became the New Zealand Homosexual Law Reform Society. Lord Cobham, a former governor-general, was invited to become its patron. His letter to the society secretary, Jack Goodwin, declining patronage was blunt and expressed a common attitude: "These people are mentally sick to as great an extent as, for example, people suffering from smallpox are sick. The whole problem of legalizing this offence seems to me to hinge upon the extent to which the disease is contagious."

== See also ==
- LGBT in New Zealand
