= Hero Parade =

Annual LGBT event in Auckland, New Zealand

- Status: Defunct
- Genre: LGBTQ+ Pride
- Frequency: Annually
- Venue: Ponsonby Road
- Locations: Auckland, New Zealand
- Years active: 1992 - 2001
- Attendance: 200,000

The Hero Parade was an (almost) annual gay and lesbian parade in Auckland, New Zealand which operated from 1992 to 2001. It was part of the Hero Festival. The Hero Parade and Festival usually took place in February, a week or two ahead of the Sydney Gay and Lesbian Mardi Gras.

== History ==
According to its original organisers, the Hero Parade was intended to foster a sense of community amongst LGBTQ people, and acknowledge those who were fighting HIV/AIDS. The event was attended by more than one hundred thousand people annually, (and at its height, by as many as two hundred thousand).

From 1992 to 1995, the Hero Parade procession took place on Queen Street, in the Central Business District of Auckland. However, in 1996, it was relocated to Ponsonby Road. In 1998 the Prime Minister of New Zealand, Rt Hon Jenny Shipley, of the National Party attended and spoke at the parade for the first time. Shipley was also present at the parade in 1999 The Leader of the Opposition, Rt Hon Helen Clark had also attended the Parade several times. The Hero Parade was initiated with a ribbon cutting ceremony. Notable people who launched the parade included Georgina Beyer and Joe Hawke.

The parade faced opposition advertising from an organisation called Stop Promoting Homosexuality International, prompting complaints to the New Zealand Human Rights Commission. Opposition also came from Deputy-Mayor David Hay, who attempted to have the parade cancelled.

Despite being relatively well-attended, the Hero Parade faced financial pressures. In 1998, the Auckland City Promotions Committee voted against funding the Parade. A complaint against the committee was made to the New Zealand Human Rights Commission, alleging "discrimination on the grounds of sexual orientation". The Commission reported that it could not find any evidence of discrimination. Fundraising for the 1998 parade was carried out by Metro magazine. The 2000 Hero Parade was cancelled due to a lack of funding. The final Hero Parade took place in 2001. In 2002, the Hero Charitable Trust was believed to be in $140,000 debt.

2013 saw the return of the Hero festival as the Auckland Pride Festival for the first time in 12 years. The Auckland Pride Festival once again featured a parade along Ponsonby Road (during the day rather than at night), as well as a large closing party in the newly renovated Victoria Park.

== See also ==
- LGBT rights in New Zealand
- Gay pride parades
