= Shannon Novak =

New Zealand curator and artist

- Born: 1979 (age 46–47); New Plymouth, New Zealand
- Education: Elam School of Fine Arts
- Alma mater: University of Auckland
- Known for: installation, sculpture, painting, digital art

Shannon Novak (born 1979, New Plymouth) is a New Zealand artist and curator of Croatian descent (otherwise known as Tarara in New Zealand). Novak's work aims to reduce anxiety, depression, and suicide rates for LGBTQI+ communities worldwide by highlighting the challenges and triumphs of those communities.

== Early life and activism ==
Novak was trained as a pianist in his early age. He later started composing and performing his own works. Novak grew up as a closeted LGBTQI+ person in Taranaki in the 1980's and 1990's. During this time he was the co-founder of LGBTQI+ youth group called Bent.

In late 2018, Novak co-founded the Conversion Therapy Action Group with local LGBTQI+ activists Shaneel Lal, Harry Robson, Max Tweedie, and Neihana Waitai, to work towards ending conversion therapy in New Zealand.

In 2019, Novak founded the Safe Space Alliance, a LGBTQI+ led nonprofit organisation that aims to help people find and create safe spaces for LGBTQI+ communities around the world.

In 2020, Novak successfully campaigned for a rainbow crossing in New Plymouth with support from local LGBTQI+ communities.

In 2022, the Conversion Practices Prohibition Legislation Bill passed its third and final reading, becoming law.

In 2023, Novak (through the Safe Space Alliance) initiated the reclassification of selected indecent/restricted LGBTQI+ publications under the defunct Indecent Publications Act 1963 (New Zealand) to “unrestricted”.

== Art career ==
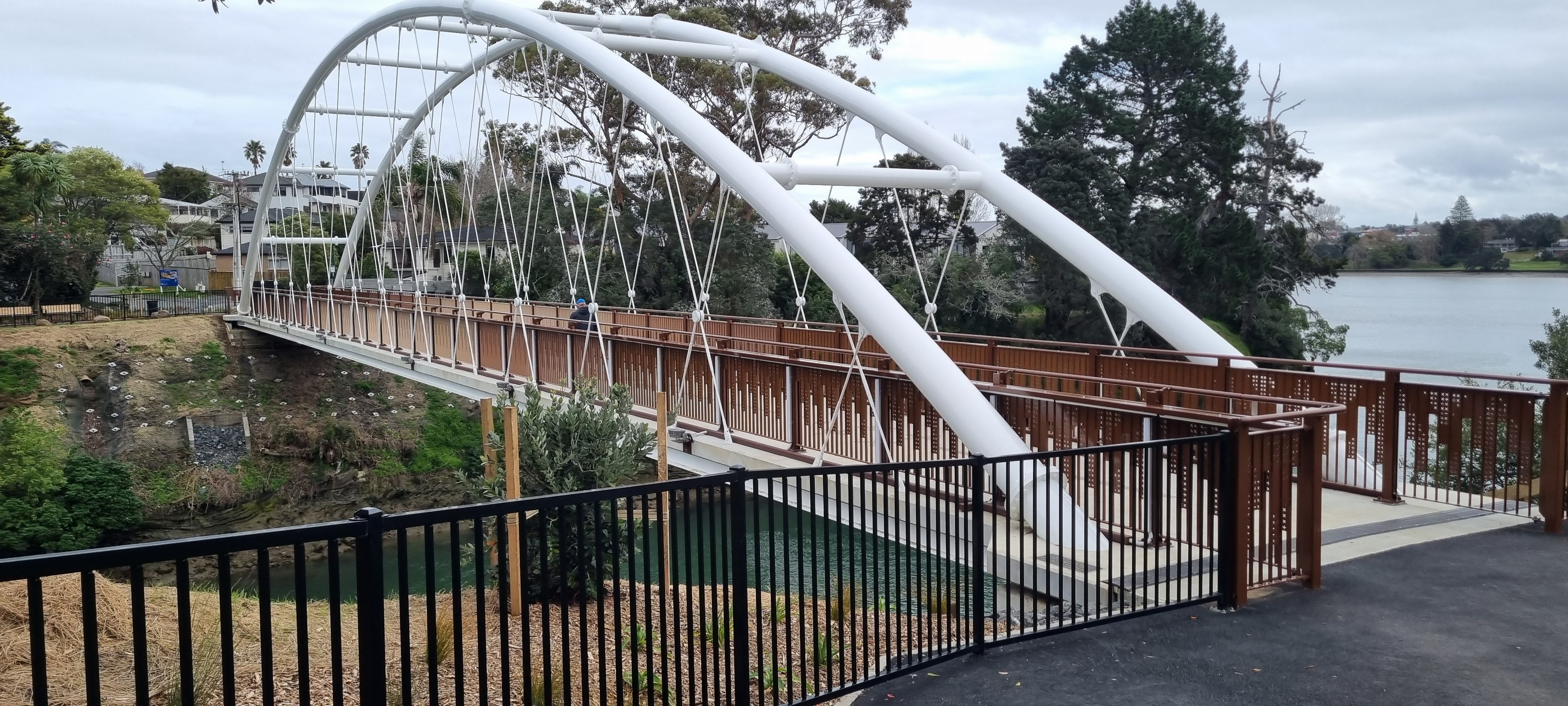
Te Kōpua o Hiku, a bridge across the Panmure Basin in Auckland that incorporates work by Janine Williams and Novak

Novak attended Elam School of Fine Arts and graduated with Master of Fine Arts from University of Auckland. Novak is known for his geometric abstraction and work that explores beyond traditional exhibition spaces such as windows, and outside of buildings. He is known to explore interrelationships between sound, colour, form, time, space, and social context surrounding the rainbow community.

From 2013, he explored art with augmented reality that animates on people's phones when pointed at specific points of his works. In 2013, Novak was commissioned by the Auckland Art Gallery to develop a body of AR work using mobile devices, augmenting artwork and architectural elements at the gallery. This work used a marker-based approach where the work was triggered by what mobile devices saw through their cameras. Later in 2013, Novak used a location-based approach where the work was triggered by GPS coordinates on mobile devices. This work was a three-dimensional AR sculpture with sound called Pastorale in Central Park that simulated the mechanics of a real sculpture, changing scale and volume (sound) depending on the viewers' distance from the work. In 2018, Novak extended this work using head -mounted displays at the Dunedin Public Art Gallery. Visitors wore a Microsoft HoloLens and could use voice commands and gestures to interact with a three-dimensional AR sculpture, changing its size, colour, and configuration.

In 2018, Novak co-developed a work at Te Tuhi called Flight of the Magnolia. This work used existing security cameras to visualise movement in real time on an onsite screen and website. This collaboration continued in 2020 with a work in public space that translated movement into visuals.

In 2021, Novak was selected for the 10th Asia Pacific Triennial of Contemporary Art (APT10) at the Queensland Art Gallery and Gallery of Modern Art (QAGOMA). For his contribution, Novak developed Make Visible: Queensland, a community-led body of work spanning sites inside the gallery and outside the gallery including the University of Southern Queensland. Novak extended this work to New Zealand In 2022 where he initiated Make Visible: Te Whanganui-a-Tara with Wellington City Council, a project that aimed to help lower rates of anxiety, suicide, and depression for rainbow communities in Wellington.

In 2022, Novak created a project named Hard Labour in New Plymouth Prison, which between 1912 and 1952 was used to imprison gay men who were forced to do hard labour in the nearby quarry.

In 2024, Novak was commissioned to create an algorithm-based work for Te Ara I Whiti - The Lightpath where path lighting changed colour in response to movement.

In 2025, Novak presented a solo exhibition at Stanford University in collaboration with the Stanford Center for AI Safety and the Stanford Department of Art & Art History. This work highlighted the dangers of conversational AI agents with physical and virtual AI-developed work extending beyond campus to the Computer History Museum, San José Museum of Art, and Institute of Contemporary Art San José. In the same year, Te Kōpua o Hiku opened, a collaborative work between Novak and artist Janine Williams. Commissioned by Auckland City Council, the work, a bridge across the Panmure Basin in Auckland, combines elements of Māori and Croatian iconography.

Novak's works are in the collection of the Queensland Art Gallery and Gallery of Modern Art (QAGOMA, Dunedin Public Art Gallery, Suter Art Gallery, Auckland Art Gallery, Sarjeant Gallery, University of Auckland, St. Lawrence University, Chartwell Trust, and PricewaterhouseCoopers.

=== Residencies ===
- 2023 – Govett-Brewster Art Gallery Artist Residency, New Plymouth, New Zealand
- 2022 – Burnett Foundation Aotearoa Artist Partnership, New Zealand
- 2022 – The University of Southern Queensland Artist Residency, Toowoomba, Queensland, Australia
- 2011 – The University of Texas at Dallas Artist Residency, Dallas, Texas, United States

=== Selected solo exhibitions / installations ===
- 2025 – Trust.Me., Stanford University, Stanford, California, United States
- 2024 – Dušo, Commercial Bay, Auckland, New Zealand
- 2024 – Give Light, Sylvia Park, Auckland, New Zealand
- 2023 – Te Haeata (Anew), Burnett Centre, Auckland, New Zealand
- 2022 – Make Visible: Taranaki, Govett Brewster Art Gallery, New Zealand
- 2022 – Hard Labour, New Plymouth Prison, New Plymouth, New Zealand
- 2021 – Make Visible: Queensland, Queensland Art Gallery and Gallery of Modern Art (QAGOMA), Brisbane, Queensland, Australia
- 2021 – Mānawatia Takatāpui/Defending Plurality, Tauranga Art Gallery, Tauranga, New Zealand

=== Selected group exhibitions ===
- 2025 – Inflection Point, Bergman Gallery, Auckland, New Zealand
- 2024 – A Taste of Honey, St. Lawrence University, New York, United States
- 2024 – The Chronicle of <a New Love Order>, The Engine Room, Massey University, Wellington, New Zealand
- 2022 – Aotearoa Art Fair, Bergman Gallery, The Cloud, Auckland, New Zealand
- 2020 – Queer Algorithms, Gus Fisher Gallery, Auckland, New Zealand
- 2019 – Sympathetic Resonance, The Suter Art Gallery, Nelson, New Zealand
- 2016 – Garden Centennial, Bartow-Pell Mansion Museum, Pelham Bay Park, New York, United States
- 2016 – Soft Architecture, Malcolm Smith Gallery, Auckland, New Zealand
- 2015 – Data Body as Artifact, Fukuoka International Congress Center, Fukuoka, Japan
- 2015 – Disruption, Simon Fraser University, Goldcorp Centre for the Arts, Vancouver, Canada
