= New Zealand Association of Counsellors =

New Zealand professional body for counsellors

- Formation: 1974
- Type: Professional association
- Region served: New Zealand
- Field: Counselling
- Members: 2,500 (2022)
- President: Sarah Maindonald
- Website: www.nzac.org.nz

The New Zealand Association of Counsellors (NZAC) (Māori: Te Ropu Kaiwhiriwhiri o Aotearoa) is the national professional association that acts for and with counsellors to monitor and improve the service they provide. Their aim is to promote counselling services which are safe and accountable.

== History ==
The New Zealand Association of Counsellors was established in 1974 under the name the NZ Counselling and Guidance Association. The first members were counsellors appointed to secondary schools as guidance counsellors or those involved in their training and employment. The initial purpose of the New Zealand Counselling and Guidance Association was to develop a counselling identity and set up standards of training for counsellors in New Zealand.

Starting off mainly as a voluntary organisation with nearly 3000 members, the national office is now in Wellington, employing two full-time and three part-time staff. The association maintains a website that allows potential clients to look up affiliated counsellors in their area and their current membership status. In 1990, the name "New Zealand Association of Counsellors" was formally adopted and registered; 1991 saw the addition of the Māori name. The Maori name translates as “The weaving group of Aotearoa”. This name was approved by the Māori Language Commission. The decision to change the name was made on the basis that the previous name did not represent New Zealand’s bicultural situation. Following the adoption of the new names the association also shifted towards broadening the scope of its interest, away from issues solely related to education. Since the 1990s the association has sought to build international ties with other nations' counselling organisations; particularly the American, British, and Canadian associations.
