= Takatāpui =

LGBT people in Māori culture

Takatāpui (also spelled takataapui; Māori pronunciation: [ˌtakaˈtaːpʉi]) is a Māori term that is used in a similar way to LGBTQ. When speaking te reo Māori, LGBTQ people of any culture are referred to as takatāpui. In English, a takatāpui person is a Māori individual who is gay, lesbian, bisexual, Intersex (taihemarua) and/or transgender.

Traditionally, takatāpui referred to a devoted partner of the same sex. In contemporary use, takatāpui is used in response to the Western construction of "sexuality, gender, and corresponding identity expressions" (gender identity and sexual identity). Māori gender identifiers (wāhine, tāne) and gender roles—marae protocols, participation in warfare, delineated male and female modes of dress and placement of tā moko—existed prior to and outside of Western influence. The term takatāpui encompasses not only aspects of sexuality but also cultural identity. Takatāpui incorporates both a sense of indigenous identity and communicates sexual orientation; it has become an umbrella term to build solidarity among sexuality and gender minorities within Māori communities.

Takatāpui is not a new term, but the application of it is recent. The Dictionary of the Māori Language—first compiled by missionary Herbert Williams in 1832—notes the definition as "intimate companion of the same sex". After a long period of disuse there has been a resurgence since the 1980s for a label to describe an individual who is both Māori and non-heterosexual. The word takatāpui was found to have existed in pre-colonial New Zealand to describe relationships between people of the same sex. The existence of this word refutes the conservative Māori argument that homosexuality did not exist in Māori society prior to the arrival of Europeans.

== Hinemoa and Tūtānekai ==
The classic and earliest full account of the origins of gods and the first human beings is contained in a manuscript entitled Nga Tama a Rangi (The Sons of Heaven), written in 1849 by Te Rangikāheke, of the Ngāti Rangiwewehi tribe of Rotorua. The manuscript "gives a clear and systematic account of Māori religious beliefs and beliefs about the origin of many natural phenomena, the creation of woman, the origin of death, and the fishing up of lands. No other version of this myth is presented in such a connected and systematic way, but all early accounts, from whatever area or tribe, confirm the general validity of the Rangikāheke version. It begins as follows: 'My friends, listen to me. The Māori people stem from only one source, namely the Great-heaven-which-stands-above, and the Earth-which-lies-below. According to Europeans, God made heaven and earth and all things. According to the Māori, Heaven (Rangi) and Earth (Papa) are themselves the source'" (Biggs 1966:448).

One of the great love stories of the Māori world is the legend of Hinemoa and Tūtānekai. The story remains popular and is retold in songs, films, cultural theatre and dance. Hinemoa defies her family to claim Tūtānekai, her "heart's desire"—the love-child of a chief's wife who was not her social equal. In reading Te Rangikāheke's original version in Māori, Ngahuia Te Awekotuku found that Tūtānekai had a male friend, hoa takatāpui, named Tiki, and Tūtānekai was "nowhere near as impressed by Hinemoa as the romantic Victorian narrative had construed". After Tūtānekai became united with Hinemoa, Tiki famously grieved for the loss of his hoa takatāpui. Tūtānekai, feeling grieved as well, arranged that his younger sister marry Tiki to console him. While no-one can say Tūtānekai and Tiki were sexually involved, their relationship was accepted to be intimate beyond mere friendship, and the story illustrates the concept that takatāpui in traditional Māori life was not exactly the same as constructions of contemporary homosexuality in Western societies.

== Uses ==
One of the first contemporary uses of takatāpui was in a report to the Public Health Commission by Herewini and Sheridan (1994), which used the term to encompass Māori gay men as well as men who have sex with men but who do not identify as gay. The historical usage of the term might not correspond with contemporary understanding of LGBT identities, while information on non-heterosexual sexuality and variations from gender roles as we understand them today has been substantially eradicated by Victorian morality brought by colonisers and Christian missionaries. Although circumstantial, there remains some evidence that takatāpui lived without discrimination in pre-European times. Some contemporary Māori LGBTQ people use the terms gay and lesbian as a convenience, while others self-identify as takatāpui to resist the colonisation of their identities and bodies which would "deny access to important ancestral knowledge". Some use both terms depending on the context. Using takatāpui to self-identify requires acceptance of oneself as Māori as well as being LGBTQ. About one fifth of Māori are young people, but the state education system does not explicitly provide for exploring multiple identities. The traditional spiritual and social roles that takatāpui have played in historical Māori societies are not easily incorporated into teaching plans and despite a 2002 mandate from the Ministry of Education, there remains a "wholesale absence of culturally appropriate sexuality curriculum in schools for the Māori."

Derivatives of takatāpui include takatāpui kaharua for bisexual, takatāpui wahine for lesbian and takatāpui wahine ki tāne or takatāpui tāne ki wahine for trans men or trans women. Takatāpui serves as an umbrella term for all these identities.

== See also ==
- Aikāne, a similar concept in native Hawaiian culture
- LGBTQ people in New Zealand
- List of transgender-related topics
