= Auckland Pride Festival =

LGBTQ event in Auckland, New Zealand

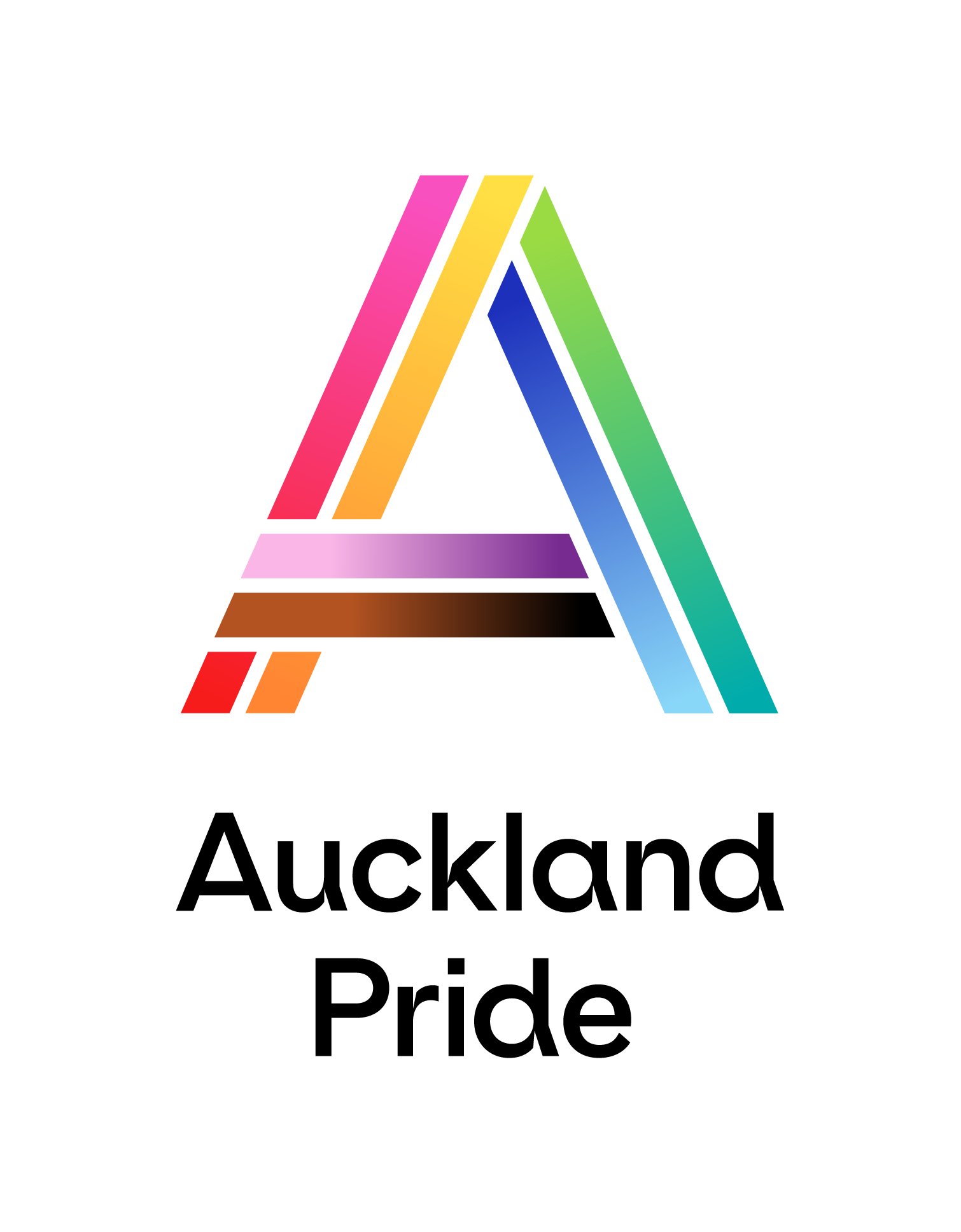
- Genre: LGBT pride parade and festival
- Frequency: Annually
- Years active: Ongoing from 2013
- Website: https://www.aucklandpride.org.nz

The Auckland Pride Festival is an annual festival held in Auckland, New Zealand. It began in 2013 and is New Zealand's largest Pride Festival. The festival has also brings together a number of other queer and queer supporting festivals and events in Auckland. They include the Same But Different Festival, Proud Centres run by Auckland Council, Ending HIV NZ Big Gay Out, F.I.N.E Festival, Heroic Gardens (until 2019), and Bear Week New Zealand (until 2019). Alongside the annual festival, Auckland Pride also hosts 'The Queer Agenda', a year-long programme of events that allow people to have a taste of pride outside of the festival dates.

== History ==
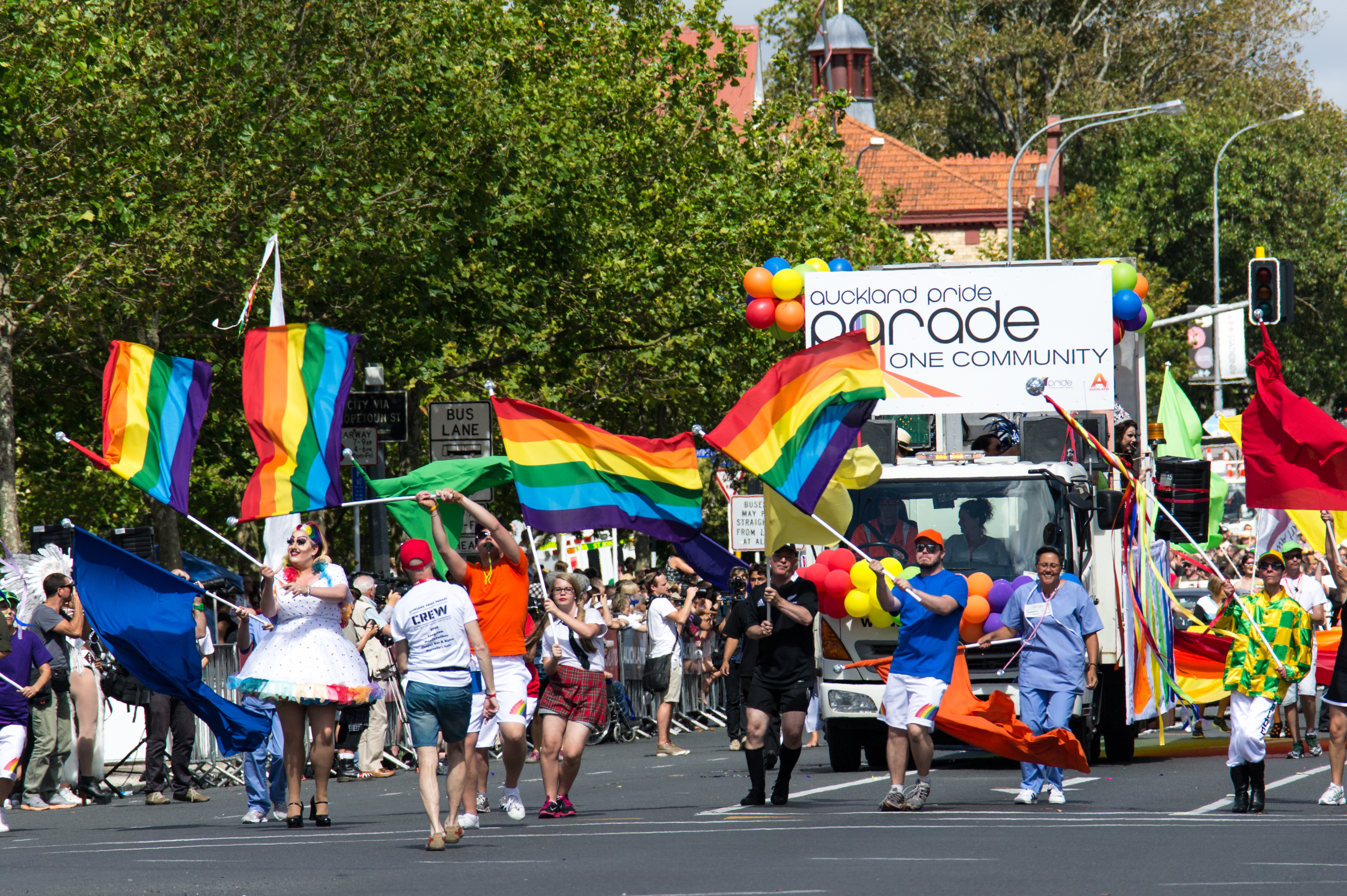
The inaugural Auckland Pride Parade in 2013

The Auckland Pride Festival was started in 2013, by Julian Cook, the inaugural festival director. In 2013 the festival had over 40 events spread out over Auckland.

In 2018 the festival had grown to over 80 events in the festival and 70 floats in the Parade. In that same year, Jacinda Ardern became the first New Zealand Prime Minister to walk in the Auckland Pride Parade.

Auckland Pride's 2020 Festival had 154 events. Proud Centres run by Auckland Council added 81 events to the festival. The New Zealand AIDS Foundation's (Ending HIV) Hauora Series gave funding to events in the Auckland Pride Festival that "focused on improving the well-being of diverse rainbow communities", adding 18 events to the festival. Spark New Zealand's Pride & Spark Empowerment Initiative helped fund 16 events.

The 2021 Auckland Pride Festival was the first ever Auckland Pride Month, with dates expanded from the general two and a half weeks to the whole month (3-28 February 2021). The 2021 Festival under the theme, 'Karanga Atu, Karanga Mai' brought together 75,796 people from across Auckland, with 203 events. Over 9,000 people took part in the 2021 Pride March. Executive Director of Auckland Pride, Max Tweedie said, "Seeing our communities and Auckland as a whole embracing Pride Month was incredible”.

In June 2021, Auckland Pride Festival also announced The Queer Agenda, a programme of year-round pride events. The purpose of this is to "[create] a platform for event organisers to promote their events from March – December, and create a unified calendar for our community and queer visitors to Auckland to connect and experience the best of what Auckland has to offer."

=== Police and Correction Uniform Ban ===
In 2017, the board banned the New Zealand Department of Corrections from walking in the parade as they did not follow through with their promises to improve support for queer prisoners. The board worked together with the Department of Corrections and the community to implement change within the prison system for queer prisoners due to the previous protests that happened in 2015 and 2016.

In 2019 the Auckland Pride Board made the decision after a number of community hui (meetings) to not allow the New Zealand Police to march in uniform during the 2019 Auckland Pride Parade. Following this decision Police announced they were disappointed, but as a result would not participate in the protest. The boards decision was controversial, with the boards treasurer Matty Jackson resigning and a number of sponsors withdrawing financial support in response, including Vodafone, NZME, ANZ, BNZ, Westpac, Fletcher Building, and SKY City. In response to the withdrawals, those who supported the Board's decision created a crowdfunding page, which raised $30,468.40. Some of those who opposed the Board's decision signed a motion of no confidence, and called for a Special General Meeting (SGM). This motion was defeated at a SGM on 6 December 2018.

A splinter group, Auckland Rainbow Parade (then Rainbow Pride Auckland) formed to recreate a Parade, following a controversial period which saw the Auckland Pride Parade become OurMarch, a grassroots march focusing on current political issues within the extended Rainbow Community.

== Major events delivered by Auckland Pride ==
=== Tuwheratanga ===
The Auckland Pride Festival officially starts at its Dawn Ceremony where a karakia and the call of the kaikaranga and pūtātara is performed. It was held at Western Park on Ponsonby Road in 2017 & 2018, it then transitioned into Te Takaranga Āniwaniwa for the 2020 Festival and was held in Aotea Square. The name was changed to Tuwheratanga for the 2021 festival and was held on top of Maungawhau / Mount Eden. This was previously known as the Auckland Pride Dawn Ceremony and Te Takaranga Āniwaniwa.

=== Pride March ===
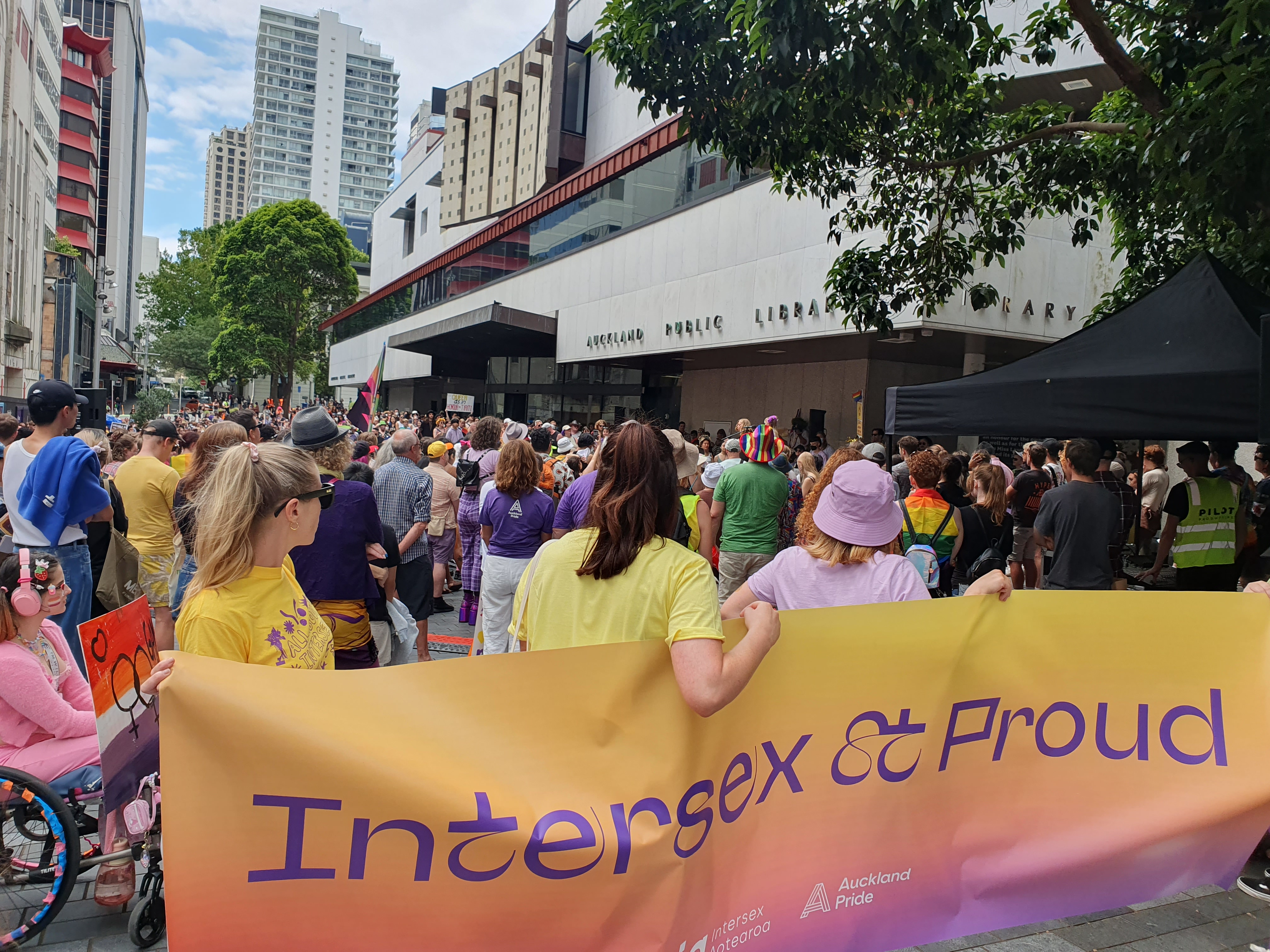
The 2023 Auckland Pride March called for a celebration of intersex people

The original Auckland Pride Parade, much like the Hero Parade was situated on Ponsonby Road until 2019 when Auckland Pride Festival shifted their focus to calls to action that benefit the intersectionality of the rainbow community. The 2019 and 2020 Parades became OurMarch, which now starts from Albert Park, Auckland and concludes in Aotea Square. The march continues on this route but is now just called the Auckland Pride March. This was previously known as Auckland Pride Parade and OurMarch.

=== Pride Party ===
Pride Party (previously known as PROUD 2013-2019 and OurParty 2019-2020) is the closing party for the Auckland Pride Festival and is held after the Pride March. Notable performs include Courtney Act and Le1f.

=== Protests ===
In 2014 protesters demonstrated against the Israeli Embassy's presence at the parade.

In 2015, the activist group People Against Prisons Aotearoa (then known as No Pride in Prisons) was formed to protest the participation of the New Zealand Police and Department of Corrections in the Auckland Pride Parade and Festival. In 2016, 50 protesters, led by No Pride in Prisons, demonstrated at the Auckland Pride parade. The group said it was disgraceful that Auckland Pride allowed police and Corrections to march in the parade.

At the 2015 Pride Parade, one of the protester was injured during an altercation with security staff. In 2016, No Pride in Prisons brought the parade to a halt with a protest coming from the opposite end of Ponsonby road to clash with the parade. This protest was again for the rights of transgender people in prisons.

In 2018 TERF activists disrupted the parade by holding a sign that read "stop giving kids sex hormones, protect lesbian youth." After a short while, they were asked to move by parade staff.

== Governance ==
Auckland Pride is governed by an elected board, and recently, has co-opted members on for advisory purposes. The 2021 board and advisers is listed below,

=== Board members and advisors ===
| Name | Role | Notes |
|---|---|---|
| Kaan Hiini | Co-chair | |
| Robyn Vella | Co-chair | |
| Kyle Habershon | Treasurer | |
| Christian Rika | Secretary | |
| Kara Beckford | Takatāpui Representative | |
| Shaneel Lal | | |
| Priscilla Palmer | | Priscilla died on 27 August 2021 – a month after being elected to the board |

Previous board members of note include: Lexie Matheson and Phylesha Brown-Acton.

== See also ==
- Hero Parade
- Big Gay Out
- LGBT rights in New Zealand
- Gay pride parades
