= Johan Mijail =

Dominican writer and performance artist (1990–2026)

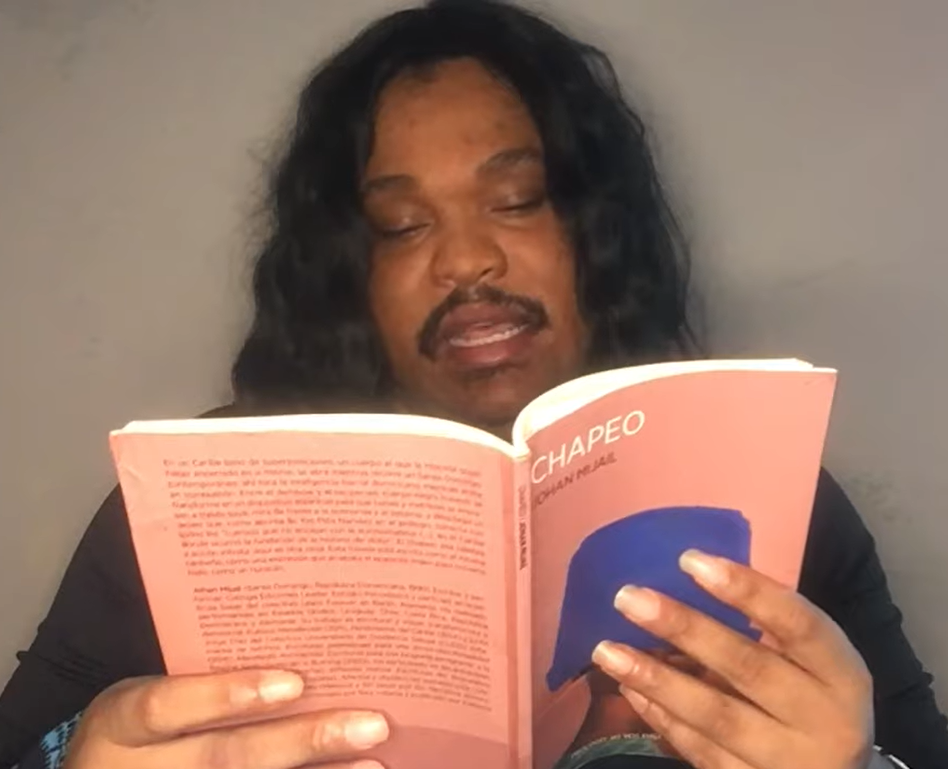
- Mijail in 2021
- Born: Johan Mijail Castillo Guillén; 1990; Santo Domingo, Dominican Republic
- Died: 6 September 2026 (aged 36)
- Occupations: Writer; performance artist

Johan Mijail (1990 – 6 September 2026) was a Dominican writer and performance artist. Openly transgender and born to a white father and Afro-Dominican mother, Mijail lived in Chile from 2012 to 2019. These experiences as a Black immigrant in majority-white Chile, as well as other issues of race, gender, sex, and colonialism, formed the basis for her work. She wrote the books Metaficciones (2011), Inflamadas de retórica (2016), Manifesto Antirracista (2018), and the zine Santo Domingo is Burning. Her only novel was Chapeo, published in 2021.

== Early life and education ==
Johan Mijail was born Johan Mijail Castillo Guillén in Santo Domingo, in the Dominican Republic, in 1990. Her father was white and her mother was Afro-Dominican; as a result, her father's family did not accept her parents' relationship.

Mijail grew up in Villa Mella and studied journalism.

== Artistic career ==
Much of Mijail's work dealt with colonialism, sex, race, and her life as an Afro-Dominican immigrant in majority-white Chile; Mijail had moved to Chile in 2012, after attending a performance arts festival in the country. She remained there, working with the Colectivo Universitario de Disidencia Sexual, until 2019 when she returned to the Dominican Republic. She described her creative process as rooted in what she termed "masisi writing/creating", (Note: Masai is a slur for gay men in Haitian creole) which she said attempted to deal with" . . . the most visible racisms of the hegemonic and advertising discourse, but also the internalized racisms which we need to unlearn the most".

Her first book, Metaficciones, was released in 2011; it contained a collection of her writings. She followed it with Inflamadas de retórica (2016), which she wrote with Jorge Díaz; it had an introduction by Nelly Richard, a prologue by Carmen Berenguer, and a post-amble by Valeria Flores. Her third book, Manifesto Antirracista was published by Libros de La Mujer Rota in 2018 and had a prologue by María Emilia Tijoux.

In addition to her writing and performance art, Mijail organized Lecturas Cuir: a series of public readings and performances by queer Dominican artists in the Dominican Republic from 2019 to 2020. She also ran Catinga Ediciones, a publishing company for LGBTQ+ people of African descent.

Mijail's final work before her death was the book Ánima sola.

=== Amor vegetal (2015) ===
Described in the Journal of Latin American Cultural Studies as Mijail's "most famous performance", Amor vegetal was a performance art piece which Mijail held in multiple locations. In 2015, she received a Migrant Grant from Chilean National Museum of Fine Arts to stage the piece in Santiago. In Amor vegetal, Mijail appears wearing combat boots and, in some performances, a shirt and red paint over her genitals. In other performances, she is nude save for her footwear. The combat boots symbolize the history of war and US military actions in Latin America and the red paint represents bloods. In performances, Mijail "does headstands while inserting small branches, leaves or flowers in her rectum". She associates the anus with the natural world; according to Mijail, she created the project "as an investigation-experience deviated from the norm of sex-gender binarism; my own process of transidentity that beginning from writing and performance, centres its reflection on the ass/anus and uses its procto-poetic dimensions to propose a decolonial space as a metaphor that could put into tension what structures the cisheterodominant regime".

=== Chapeo (2021) ===
Mijail's only novel, Chapeo, was published in 2021 by the Mexican publisher Elefanta Editorial. The title Chapeo is taken from Dominican slang, and refers to the practice of exchanging sex for money. The story itself deals with gender and race. Set in Santo Domingo, the novel takes place over one day when two transgender friends, Luis and the narrator, look for sexual partners in the city. Luis wishes to undergo gender-affirming surgery and move to the United States, and is critical of the narrator's life and fascination with the Las 21 Divisiones religion. They separate and the narrator is possessed by spirits from Las 21 Divisiones, Anaisa and San Elías.

== Personal life and death ==
Mijail was openly transgender and used feminine pronouns. She described herself as Transmarica (a Spanish neologism combining the terms "trans" and "marica"). She had several tattoos with Caribbean symbolism, wore dresses and makeup, and had a "daringly coloured moustache".

Mijail was hospitalized in August 2026; she died on 6 September 2026, at the age of 36.

== Bibliography ==
- Metaficciones (2011)
- Pordioseros del Caribe (2014)
- Inflamadas de retórica: escrituras promiscuas para una tecno-decolonialidad (2016). With Jorge Díaz.
- Manifesto Antirracista: escrituras para una biografia inmigrante (2018)
- Santo Domingo is Burning (fanzine)
- Chapeo (2021)
- Un manifiesto analquista. Tra(n)splantar: Poéticas anales y Amor vegetal (2021; fanzine)
- Ánima sola: Apuntes para una epistemología travesti del sentir_estando

== Filmography ==
- Sister (2014, by the collective LEWIS FOREVER)

== See also ==
- LGBTQ literature in the Dominican Republic
