= Grímsdóttir =

Grímsdóttir may refer to:

- Vigdís Grímsdóttir (born 1953), Icelandic writer and teacher
- Anna Grímsdóttir, fictional character the Tom Clancy's Splinter Cell video game franchise
