= Michael Cart =

American author (1941–2025)

Michael Cart (March 6, 1941 – February 13, 2025) was an American author, librarian, and expert in children's and young adult literature.

== Life and career ==
Born in Logansport, Indiana, he earned a degree in Library Science from Columbia University in 1964 and a degree in journalism from Northwestern University. From 1964 to 1967 he served in the United States Army. From 1976 to 1991, he was the director of the Beverly Hills Public Library. Among other accomplishments, he was the first director of the Arne Nixon Center for the Study of Children's and Young Adult Literature at California State University, Fresno. Through the center, he established the Michael Cart Research Fellowship at CSU Fresno in 2019 to support studies on children's literature.

Cart was also a teacher at Texas Woman's University and University of California, Los Angeles.

Cart received the Grolier Award in 2000 and was the inaugural recipient of the YALSA/ Greenwood Publishing Group Service to Young Adults Award in 2008. In 2026, he was inducted into the California Library Hall of Fame.

Cart died in Indiana on February 13, 2025, at the age of 83. He donated thousands of books and materials to the Arne Nixon Center for the Study of Children's Literature and significantly expanded their collection, especially their collection of LGBTQ+ literature.

== Selected works ==
- Cart, M. What's so funny?: Wit and humor in American children's literature(1st ed.). New York, NY: HarperCollins Publishers. 1995.
- Cart, M. In the stacks: Short stories about libraries and librarians( 1st ed.). New York: Overlook Press. 2002.
- Cart, M., & Jenkins, C. The heart has its reasons: Young adult literature with gay/lesbian/queer content, 1969-2004. Lanham, MD: Scarecrow Press. 2006.
- Cart, M. Young adult literature: From romance to realism. Chicago: American Library Association. 2010.
- Cart, M. Cart's top 200 adult books for young adults: Two decades in review. Chicago: ALA Editions. 2013.
- Cart, M., & Jenkins, C. Top 250 LGBTQ books for teens: Coming out, being out, and the search for community. Chicago: Huron Street Press. 2015.
