= LGBTQ literature =

LGBTQ literature, sometimes called queer literature, refers to works with LGBTQ themes, characters, or authors. It is a subset of LGBTQ media. There are LGBTQ literary awards to recognize works in this tradition.

LGBTQ literature may refer to:

- Works by LGBTQ authors
- Works centering LGBTQ characters, including in modern written fiction and graphic arts
- Other literature featuring the LGBTQ community

Subtypes of LGBTQ literature include:

- Lesbian literature
- Gay literature
- Bisexual literature
- Transgender literature
- Intersex literature

== By country ==
- LGBTQ literature in Argentina
- LGBTQ literature in Australia
- LGBTQ literature in Brazil
- China: Danmei
- LGBTQ literature in Canada
- LGBTQ literature in Chile
- LGBTQ literature in Colombia
- LGBTQ literature in Costa Rica
- LGBTQ literature in the Dominican Republic
- LGBTQ literature in Ecuador
- LGBTQ literature in El Salvador
- LGBTQ literature in France
- LGBTQ literature in Guatemala
- LGBTQ literature in Iceland
- India: LGBTQ literature in India, Tamil literary works on sexual minorities
- Japan: Boys' Love, Gay Manga, Yuri
- LGBTQ literature in Mexico
- Netherlands and Flanders: LGBTQ literature in the Dutch-language area
- LGBTQ literature in New Zealand
- LGBTQ literature in Panama
- LGBTQ literature in Singapore
- LGBTQ literature in Spain
- LGBTQ literature in Sri Lanka
- Taiwan: Tongzhi literature
- LGBTQ literature in the United Kingdom
- United States: Black lesbian literature in the United States, LGBTQ Latino literature
- LGBTQ literature in Venezuela

== By genre or style ==
- LGBTQ periodicals
- LGBTQ romance
- LGBTQ-themed speculative fiction
- LGBTQ themes in comics
- LGBTQ themes in horror fiction
- LGBTQ themes in mythology
- Timeline of LGBTQ journalism

Further subgenres include:

- Gay pulp fiction
- Gay teen fiction
- Homoerotic poetry
- Lesbian periodicals
- Lesbian pulp fiction
- Slash fiction
- Trans poetry

== Related topics ==
- Category:LGBTQ book publishing companies
- Category:LGBTQ museums and archives
- LGBTQ bookstores
- LGBTQ literary awards
- Libraries and the LGBTQ community

=== Censorship ===
- List of LGBTQ books banned in Russia
- Proposed bans of LGBTQ-themed books in the United States
