= LGBTQ literature in Iceland =

Icelandic literature focused on LGBTQ topics

LGBTQ literature in Iceland consists of literary works written by Icelandic authors that contain plots, themes, or characters which are part of or related to LGBTQ people. The first Icelandic literary references to homosexuality are found in the Sagas of Icelanders, particularly in Njáls saga. Its protagonist has a friendship which some researchers have described as homoerotic.

During the 20th century one of the most prominent queer authors was the bisexual writer Elías Mar, who published several novels in the 1940s with characters showing internal conflicts which some critics have interpreted as the result of their repressed homosexuality, particularly Man eg þig löngum (1949). In 1960, Mar also published the story "Saman lagt spott og speki", considered the first Icelandic literary work with an openly homosexual theme. Other notable LGBTQ authors of the 20th century were Guðbergur Bergsson, Nína Björk Árnadóttir and Vigdís Grímsdóttir.

The 21st century has seen the appearance of a growing number of works with LGBTQ themes, by authors like Jónína Leósdóttir, Lilja Sigurdardottir, or Sjón, who have explored the theme in genres such as young adult fiction and detective fiction.

== Middle Ages ==
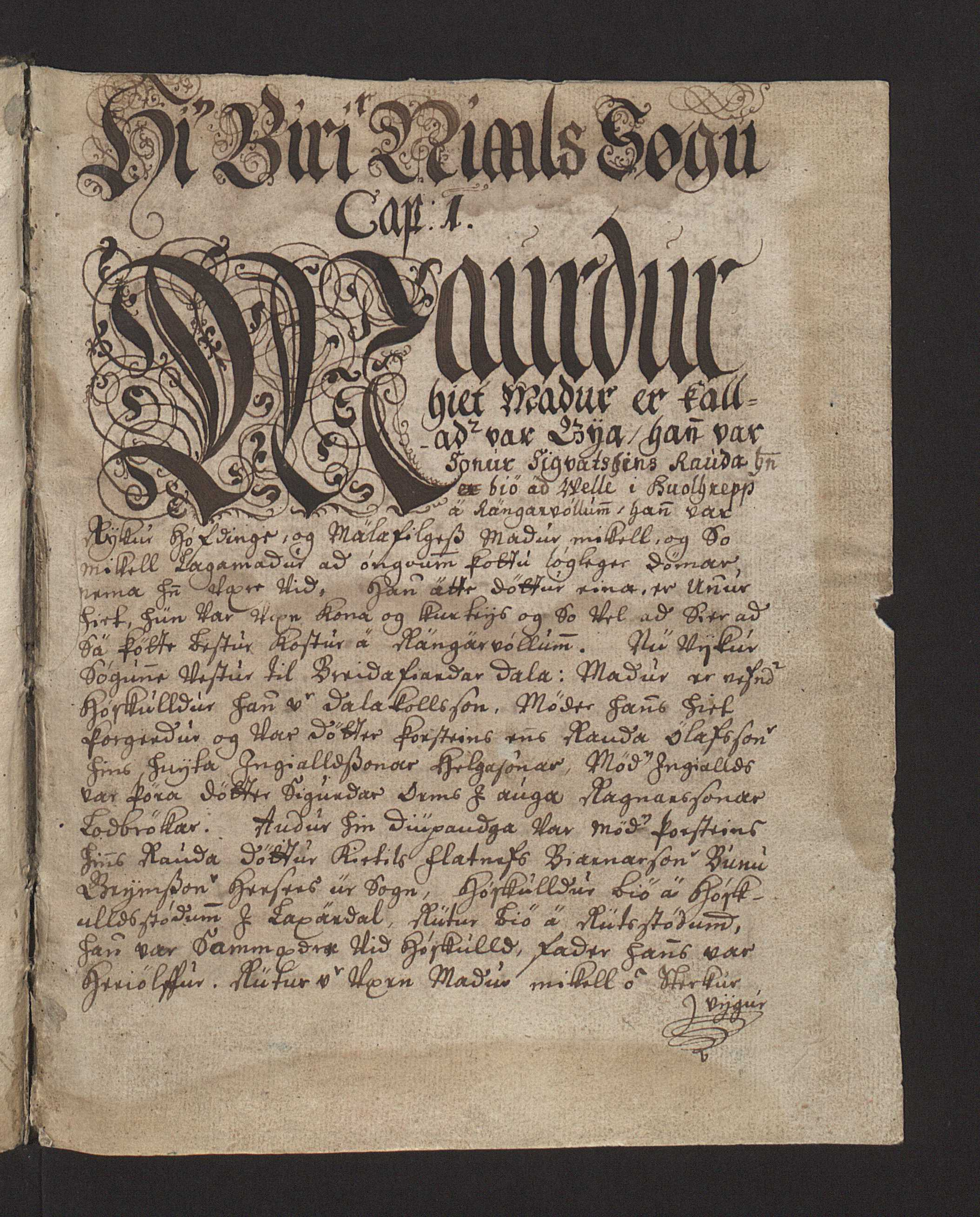
Page from Njál's Saga.

The oldest literary references to homosexuality in Iceland are found in the Sagas of Icelanders, texts written during the Middle Ages that include terms such as "ragur", "stroðinn", and "sorðinn", terms which are used to describe gay, effeminate, or cowardly men. Some researchers, like Professor Óttar Guðmundsson, have identified homoerotic elements in works like Njál's Saga, particularly in the relationship between the protagonist and his friend Gunnar. This saga was the favorite book of the Icelandic LGBTQ community in the mid-20th century because of the relationship between these two characters.

In the same saga the heroes Flosi Þórðarson and Guðmundr inn ríki Eyjólfsson are accused of being homosexual. Although academics have traditionally considered the accusation to be unsubstantiated, there are indications that, at least in Gudmundur's case, it may be consistent with his overall literary representation in the Icelandic sagas. In Ljósvetninga saga, it is said that Guðmundr used to house the sons of nobles and that he treated them so well, that "his only task was to dine next to him". The saga also mentions Þorbjörn the weak, a man described as bad at work and fighting, but with whom Gudmundur is close and whom he hires with the sole charge of "bathing with his master". When Þorbjörn is killed, the skyr he had ingested shortly before begins to ooze from his wound, which may be an allusion to Gudmundur's semen.

== 20th century ==
In 1927, the writer and future Nobel laureate Halldór Laxness published the novel Vefarinn mikli frá Kasmír, in which he included one of the earliest references to homosexuality in modern Icelandic literature. The book follows the story of Steinn Elliði, an unstable young man who travels around Europe in search of his place in the world and who, in several passages, recounts his sexual experiences. He mentions, despite being heterosexual, that sex between men represented "the greatest sexual gratification." This passage received both praise and criticism in Icelandic reviews for its representation of European modernity, which was controversial in Iceland. Laxness himself had written a letter two years earlier in which he had declared, in reference to the modernity the country's capital was reaching: "Reykjavík has suddenly obtained everything that suits a cosmopolitan city, not just a university and cinemas, but also soccer and homosexuality."

In the middle of the 20th century the bisexual writer Elías Mar wrote several works with protagonists who showed homoerotic desires. Some references to these themes appear from his first novels, although not directly. Eftir örstuttan leik (1946) tells the first-person story of Þórhall, a twenty-something student known as Bubba who lives in Reykjavík and who suffers an existential crisis for not being able to adapt to the social expectations of him. Although the work does not include direct references to homosexuality, contemporary critics have found in the protagonist's internal conflicts and his chaotic relationships with women indicative of a repressed homosexual desire.

In Man eg þig löngum (1949), allusion to homosexuality is more direct. Halldór, the novel's protagonist, is a young man from a fishing village who is sent to study in the capital because of his affinity for literature. During his time at a boarding school, Halldór is tormented by being "different" and by not meeting the social expectations of manhood. One of his friends, called Boas, urges him to read the book Uranie, by Camille Flammarion, which depicts characters who experience and enjoy their genders differently from earthlings; this book's title is thought to be a reference to Uranism and early gay rights pioneer Karl Heinrich Ulrichs. At the end of the novel, Halldór receives sexual advances from a man who takes him home, and while he considers staying, Halldór escapes. Years later, Mar asserted that Man eg þig löngum should have had a second part in which Halldór came out of the closet and became a writer. The academic Ásta Kristín Benediktsdóttir found autobiographical characteristics of Mar in Halldór.

In August 1950 Mar wrote an article for the magazine Líf og list titled An episode from the London empire, in which he called for accepting the diversity of humanity, including transgender people and "love that does not dare to speak its name". This text marked a milestone, as it was the first time that an Icelandic LGBTQ person published a writing in which they spoke positively about homosexuality. It would not be until 1960 that Mar would publish a literary work that openly depicted homosexuality, with the short story "Saman lagt spott og speki"; it is considered the oldest Icelandic literary work to openly deal with the subject.

Mar revealed in the 1943 poem "Sálrænt kvæð" the conflict that his sexual identity caused him during his adolescent years, which includes the verses:

Am I a man or a woman?

Can I live like a man?

Is there anyone who cares or judges?

Does it make sense to have these thoughts?

During the 1990s, three influential novels in local LGBTQ literature were published: Sú kvalda ást sem hugarfylgsnin geyma (1993) by Guðbergur Bergsson, Þriðja astin (1995) by Nína Björk Árnadóttir, and Z ástarsaga (1996) by Vigdís Grímsdóttir. Bergsson's novel, which professor Hallberg Hallmundsson described as the "most pleasurable" of Bergsson's works, follows in the format of a diary of a married man who reflects on various subjects, including love, and has an affair with another a married man.

== 21st century ==
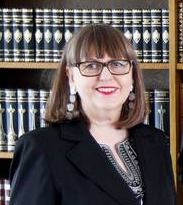
Jónína Leósdóttir in 2011.

Between 2007 and 2009 the writer Jónína Leósdóttir —wife of the former prime minister Jóhanna Sigurðardóttir — published a series of three youth novels in which the main character gradually realizes that she is a lesbian. This trilogy, which Leósdóttir started in 2007 with the release of Kossar og ólífur, is considered one of the best works of Icelandic LGBTQ literature.

In 2012 author and playwright Kristín Ómarsdóttir published Milla, which follows a young lesbian of Asian descent who works as a librarian in Reykjavík, and begins a relationship with a woman named María. It was later nominated for the Icelandic Literary Award.

In 2013 the surrealist writer Sjón published the novel Mánasteinn, which at the time of its publication was described as "the gayest book in the history of Iceland" due to its explicit depiction of sexual relations between men. It tells the story of Máni Steinn, a 16-year-old gay movie-buff who lives in 1918 Reykjavik, during the Spanish flu pandemic. Sjón dedicated the novel to his uncle, who died in 1993 of complications from HIV/AIDS. The novel received critical acclaim, and its English edition was named one of the best books of the year by the British newspaper Financial Times.

Since the 2010s some local authors have excelled in the gay erotic romance genre, such as Erica Pike, who achieved success with her series of romance books gays set in the United States. There has also been a greater exploration of lesbian relationships in contemporary literature, like the detective novel trilogy Reykjavík Noir (2015–2017) by the writer Lilja Sigurdardottir, who years before had been the deputy director of the LGBT organization Samtökin '78; or the historical novel Að eilífu ástin (2018) by Fríða Bonnie Andersen, which explores a lesbian relationship during the first decades of the 20th century.

The play Góða ferð inn í gömul sár (2023), by Eva Rún Snorradóttir, deals with the HIV epidemic in Iceland during the 1980s and 1990s, particularly through the experiences of LGBTQ people at the time.

== See also ==
- LGBTQ rights in Iceland
- LGBTQ literature

== Bibliography ==
- Benediktsdóttir, Ásta Kristín (2020), Að þekkja sinn vitjunartíma (in Icelandic), Ritið, pp. 259–290, ISSN 1670-0139
- Benediktsdóttir, Ásta Kristín (2022), "Sódó Reykjavík: How Homosexuality was Brought into Discourse in Early and Mid-Twentieth Century Iceland", Nora - Nordic Journal of Feminist and Gender Research, 30 (3), NORA: 194–207, doi:10.1080/08038740.2022.2086908, ISSN 0803-8740
- Rydström, Jens (2007), Criminally Queer: Homosexuality and Criminal Law in Scandinavia 1842-1999 (PDF), Aksant Academic Publishers, doi:10.26530/oapen_353810, ISBN 9789052602455, archived from the original (PDF) on 7 July 2022
