= Carmen Ollé =

Peruvian author

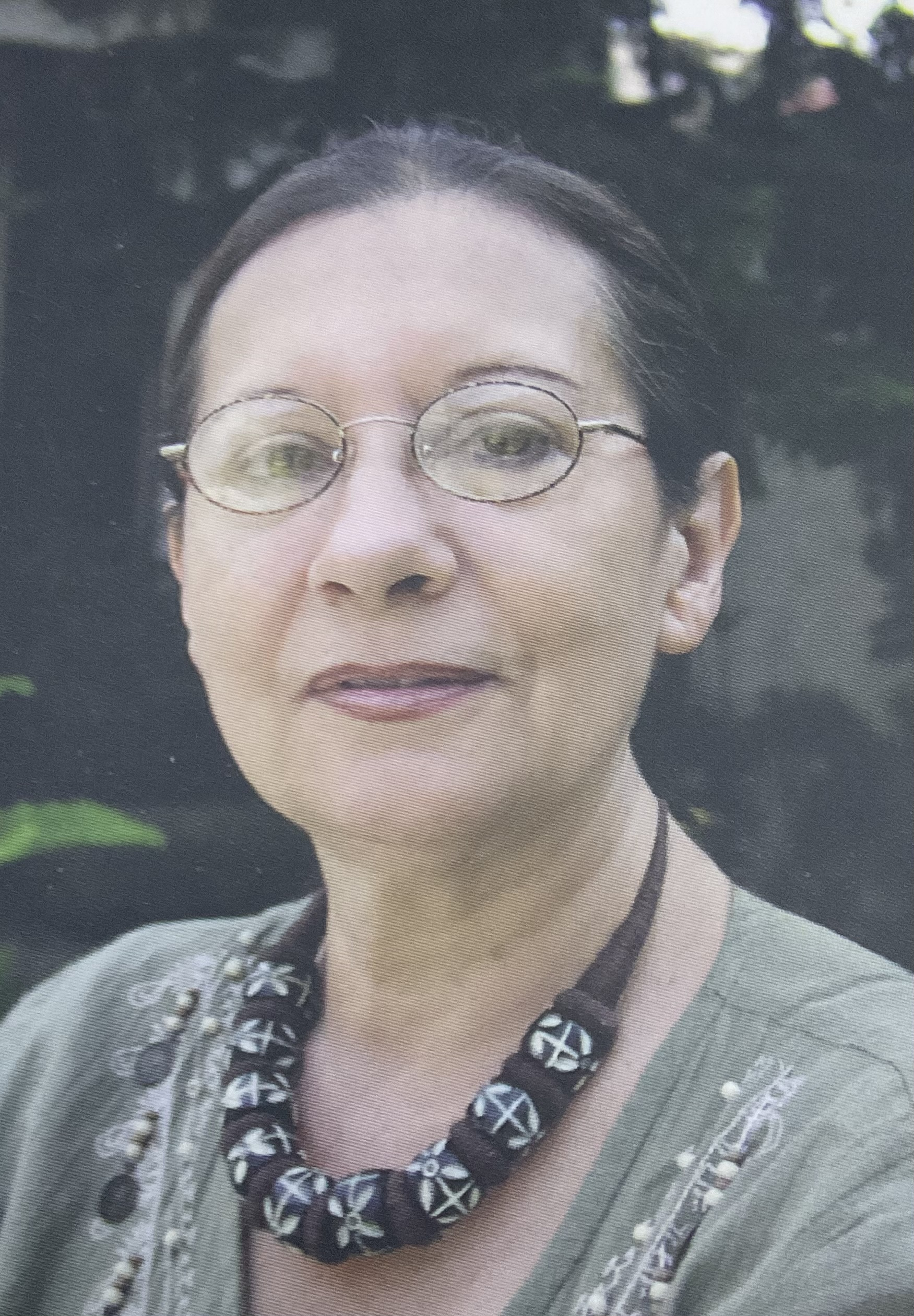
- Born: July 29, 1947 (age 79)
- Education: National University of San Marcos
- Occupations: Poet, Narrator and Literary Critic
- Spouse: Enrique Verástegui
- Children: Vanessa Verástegui Ollé

Carmen Ollé (born 29 July 1947) is a Peruvian poet, narrator, and literary critic.

== Works ==
As a writer, Carmen Ollé has ventured into both poetry and storytelling. Her first work, the collection of poems, Noches de adrenalina ("Nights of Adrenaline"), was published in 1981. Her next book Todo orgullo humea la noche ("All Pride Humea the Night" (1988) was a combination of poetry and prose. The novel, Las dos caras del deseo ("The two faces of desire"), published in 1994, deals with homosexuality and is considered representative of the Latin American LGBTQ literature. In 2007, she released her work, Retrato de mujer sin familia ante una copa ("Portrait of a woman without a family in the face of a cup" (2007), was a "fusion" in her own words, and includes a fictional interview with the novelist Patricia Highsmith.

== Style and critical reception ==
Ollé and her texts often deal in themes related to humanity and intimate knowledge. She has also attracted her fair share of criticism.

As per César Toro Montalvo (es), "[Ollé] has attracted the greatest attention from specialized criticism" and is unique "for her deep, vigorous voice that is unmistakable among Peruvian poets". Maynor Freyre (es) has praised her poems as one of the best female literary creations in Peru. Ricardo Vigil (es) compared her legacy to that of Sylvia Plath. As per Tulio Mora (es), her well-constructed dialogues and descriptions pique the reader's mind. Javier Agreda (es) observed a more conscious writer of narrative techniques in Olle.

== Awards ==
In 2015, Ollé won the Casa de la Literatura Peruana prize. In October 2018, she was honored at the 2018 Word Literature Festival. On 24 October 2019, Ollé participated in the exhibition La vida sin destemas organized by La Casa de la Literatura Peruana spanning collections from the years 1988–1999.

In 2023, her memoirs published in Destino vagranda received mention as the Best non-fiction book in the Luces del Diario El Comercio Awards. On 12 September 2025, she was awarded the José Donoso Ibero-American Letters Prize, awarded by the University of Talca, an annual distinction that recognizes writers from Latin America, Spain and Portugal across various literary genres.
