= LGBTQ literature in the Dominican Republic =

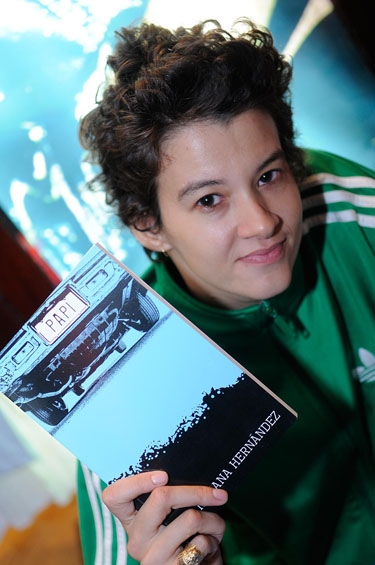
Rita Indiana, a contemporary Dominican author of LGBT literature.

LGBTQ literature of the Dominican Republic encompasses LGBTQ literature written by Dominican Republic authors that feature plots, themes, or characters belonging to or associated with sexual diversity. Though homosexuality has been repeatedly documented within the nation since the era of colonial chroniclers, centuries passed before local literature began engaging with LGBT subject matter. This long absence came to an end in the first half of the twentieth century with the release of Pedro René Contín Aybar's poem Biel, el marino (1943). Widely regarded as the first published homoerotic literary work in Dominican history, it remains the country's most prominent poem centered on this theme.

The earliest example of LGBT prose fiction is Hilma Contreras' short story "La espera" (1953), which examines female homosexuality. Numerous other Dominican writers active in the second half of the twentieth century explored sexual diversity in their texts, yet many approached the topic from a heterosexist viewpoint. Poets Luis Alfredo Torres and Leandro Morales addressed these subjects most explicitly among this generation. For prose fiction, notable contributions include José Alcántara Almánzar's short story "Lulú o la metamorfosis" (1995), alongside fellow writers Efraim Castillo and Pedro Antonio Valdez.

The start of the twenty-first century brought far more extensive representation of LGBT themes, plus the release of the country's first anthologies of Dominican gay and lesbian literature. This period also marked the breakthrough of lesbian writer Rita Indiana, who rose to critical acclaim and explored LGBT themes beginning with her debut novel La estrategia of Chocueca (2000). Indiana earned consistent critical praise in subsequent years with titles such as the novel La mucama de Omicunlé (2015), which follows a transgender protagonist. The book was shortlisted for the 2016 Mario Vargas Llosa Biennial Novel Prize.

Johan Mijail is another contemporary author who has earned international recognition for his literary treatment of LGBT themes, most prominently following the 2021 publication of her novel Chapeo. In poetry, Frank García stands out as a key voice within this movement.

== 20th Century ==
The first Dominican literary work to openly address homosexuality was the poem Biel, el marino (Biel, the Sailor), published in 1943 by writer Pedro René Contín Aybar in a limited edition of thirty copies, each consisting of fourteen pages. Although the author published the work with the intention of distributing it solely among his friends, it circulated widely and caused a scandal in Dominican society at the time. Even decades after its appearance, the text continued to be considered controversial. In the poem, which is sometimes characterized as a short story or a novella due to its narrative nature, the male poetic voice narrates his love for a sailor named Biel, with whom he begins a relationship defined by water and who is described as strong and semi-savage. The style of this work can be seen in the following fragment:

He spoke and his warm, sonorous voice resembled a resonating seashell, a submerged bell, mysterious and distant, bringing reality and fantasy close to my ears.

Although Contín Aybar never publicly declared his sexual orientation, years after his death, critic Antonio Fernández Spencer stated that the poem had been inspired by a former lover of the author who lived in Borojol, who was reportedly a barber known as Biel.

In terms of prose narrative, the first work to investigate LGBT themes was the short story "La espera" (The Waiting), published in 1953 by Hilma Contreras, which took a stand against the social condemnation of female homosexuality and depicted it as another form of loving. Two years later, poet Aída Cartagena Portalatín published the book Una mujer está sola (A Woman Is Alone); although it culminates in a final quest for a man, it initially delves into "the female figure of the sea and reflects a search for platonic eroticism."

During the second half of the 20th century, several authors explored LGBT themes in their work, though many did so from a heterosexist perspective, including Manuel Mora Serrano, who won the Siboney Prize in 1979 with his novel Goeíza. Another author exemplifying this trend is Manuel del Cabral, who in 1970 published his poetry collection Sexo no solitario (Non-Solitary Sex) with the intention of provoking his readers and transgressing the social conventions of the era. Among the poems in the book are "Ano" (Anus) and "La canción del invertido" (The Song of the Invert), written by Cabral as parodies of erotic poetry. Contemporary authors have specifically pointed out the second poem for its homophobic nature.

The 1970s also brought the publication of two homoerotic, though non-explicit, poetic works by poets Luis Alfredo Torres and Manuel Antonio Rueda González. In Los bellos rostros (The Beautiful Faces, 1973), Torres investigates his position as a homosexual man outlawed by society, condemned to explore his desire only through the memories of the beautiful faces he has contemplated. Rueda, on his part, published the poetry collection Con el tambor de las Islas (With the Drum of the Islands) in 1975, in which he displays his admiration for the American LGBT poet Allen Ginsberg. Although Rueda's homosexuality was known in his time, he never expressed it explicitly in his poetry. Nonetheless, certain characters in his short story collection Papeles de Sara y otros relatos (Sara's Papers and Other Stories, 1985) feature minor autobiographical glimpses into the author's own complicated life.

The following years saw the appearance of several more poets who explored androgyny in their work, though they did not address homoeroticism directly. Among them were Armando Almánzar Botello, Pastor de Moya, and Ylonka Nacidit-Perdomo. Leandro Morales was more explicit in his approach, and in his poetry collection Gozar con extraños (Enjoying with Strangers), he explored the beauty of the male body and casual encounters in verses such as the following:

We met in a bar now closed by the beauty that decimates us.

We met in the bathroom of a train station, Shaving our legs and our faces we met. These are the contingencies of the duration that surrounds us. I like fucking with strangers. Meeting suddenly in the yellowest and wettest center

Of a forest.

The 1990s saw the publication of works such as "Lulú o la metamorfosis" (1995) by José Alcántara Almánzar, a short story following a character who undergoes a bodily transformation and possesses both male and female organs, which was included in the 2008 anthology Our Caribbean: A Gathering of Lesbian and Gay Writing from the Antilles. In 1999, Efraim Castillo included several sexually diverse characters in his novel El personero, while Pedro Antonio Valdez published Bachata del ángel caído (Bachata of the Fallen Angel), his first novel, in which he included the character of "el Mecedora" (The Rocking Chair), a homosexual man who is raped by a character known as "El Machote" (The Tough Male), in a scene narrated in the following terms:

El Machote hesitated between laughing or kicking him. He was in that dichotomy when, in a sudden transition—attracted by the strange seduction, overflowing with sadism, or surrendered to the blind rage that boredom usually produces—he placed el Mecedora on all fours, pulled his pants down by force, and... possessed him brutally... The loader tried to flee from that savage shaking, but El Machote held him by the neck...

== 21st century ==
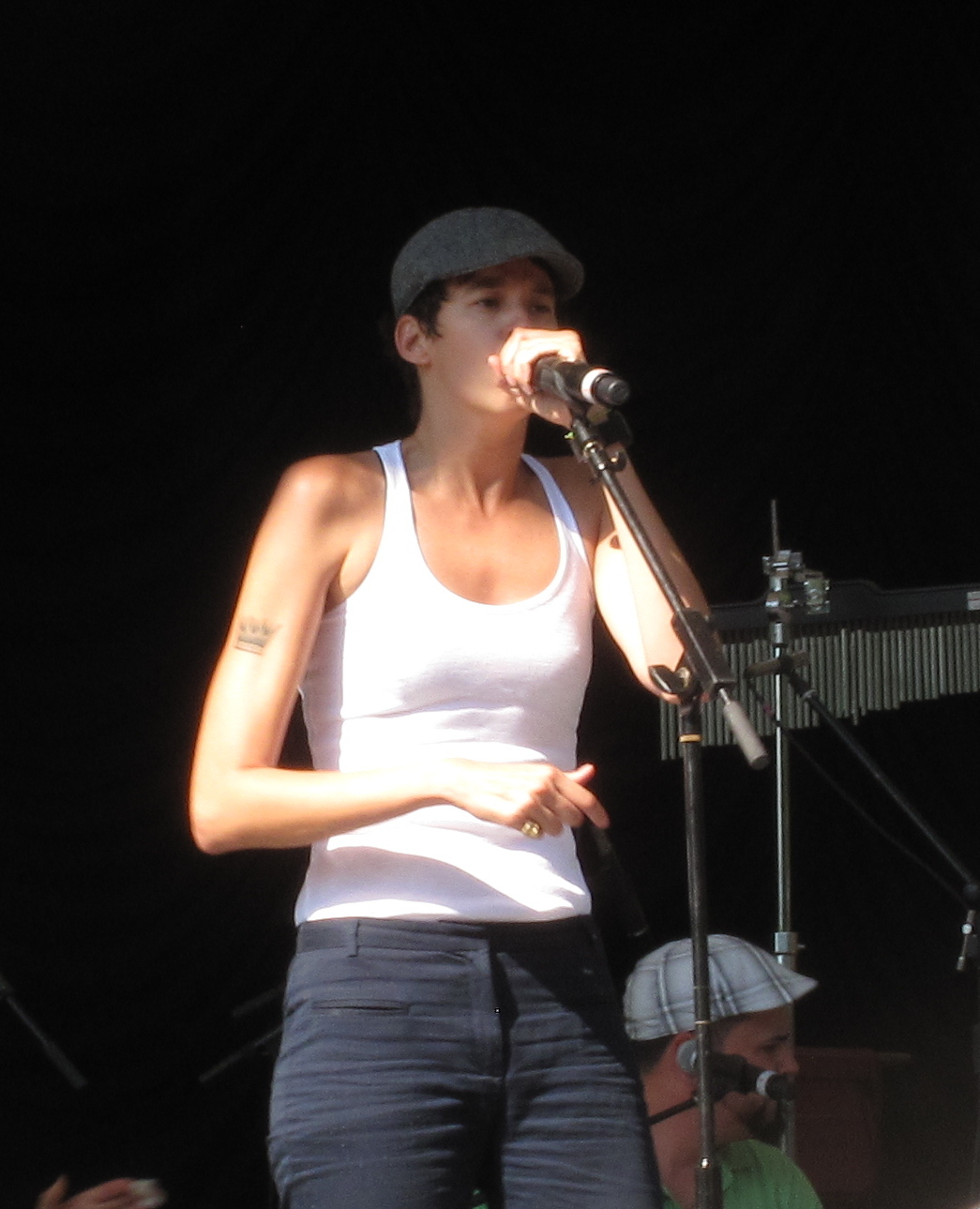
Rita Indiana in 2011.

The early years of the 21st century saw an increase in the representation of LGBT themes in Dominican literature. Of particular prominence was the emergence of authors such as Rita Indiana, who became a local literary phenomenon with her first novel, La estrategia de Chocueca (2000), in which both the protagonist and other characters engage in same-sex romances. This work was followed by the novels Papi (2005), which contains autobiographical elements, and Nombres y animales (2013), where she again presents a protagonist with fluid sexuality who later accepts her homosexuality.

Other notable LGBT works from the early 21st century include novels such as Mayra Santos-Febres's Sirena Selena vestida de pena (2000). Although written by a Puerto Rican author, the novel explores the Dominican LGBT subculture through the story of a transgender or cross-dressing teenager who migrates to the country to work as a bolero singer. Drag and transvestite identity was also a central theme in Carnaval de Sodoma (2002), Pedro Antonio Valdez's second novel. In this work, which was adapted into a film of the same name in 2006, Valdez tells the story of several frequent customers of a cabaret who are captivated by the charm of the Jade Princess, a young woman of Asian origin who is later revealed to be a cross-dresser.

In 2004, compilers Miguel de Camps and Mélida García published Antología de la literatura gay en la República Dominicana, which compiled a series of Dominican literary works addressing gender and sexual diversity. The book was the first compilation of LGBT literature in the country, although it received criticism regarding its selection criteria. Particularly, it was criticized for including texts that portrayed sexual diversity in a negative light; according to critics such as Claudia Patricia Giraldo, the book could also be viewed as an "anthology of the literature of homophobia" in the Dominican Republic. Two years6, in 2006, scholar Jacqueline Jiménez Polanco published Divagaciones bajo la Luna, an anthology focused on Dominican lesbian literature, which was also the first of its kind.

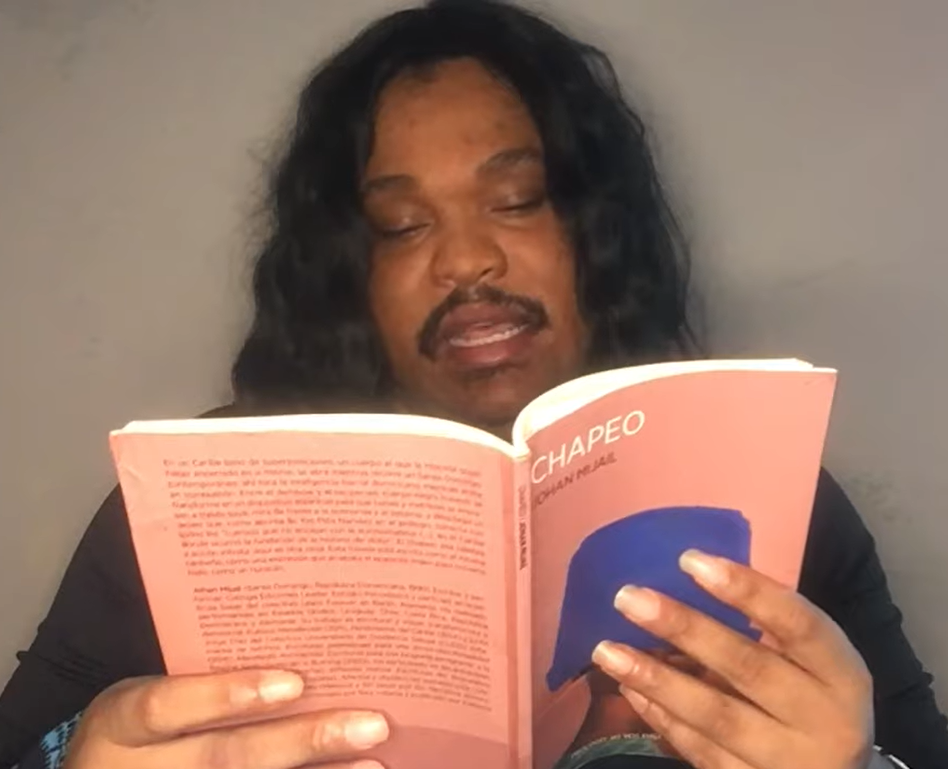
Johan Mijail, the person who published the novel Chapeo in 2021.

Among the most notable Dominican works with LGBT themes in recent years are novels such as La mucama de Omicunlé (The Maid of Omicunlé, 2015) by Rita Indiana, which was a finalist for the 2016 Mario Vargas Llosa Biennial Novel Prize. The novel features Acilde as its protagonist, a character who changes sex after receiving an injection and undergoes a journey through time. Another significant work is Chapeo, a 2021 novel by Johan Mijail, which was well-received by international critics and is considered one of the best Latin American LGBT novels of recent years. The plot of the work, which incorporates a large number of neologisms and addresses themes such as decoloniality, follows two transfeminine "amiguxs" (gender-neutral term for friends) wandering through Santo Domingo as they explore their sexuality and identity while seeking a way to obtain a visa to travel to the United States.

In poetry, prominent works include Lo que escribí mientras esperabas en una habitación vacía (What I Wrote While You Waited in an Empty Room, 2022), written by Frank García, which addresses homosexuality within the Dominican context.

== See also ==
- Dominican Republic literature
- LGBTQ literature in Cuba

== Sources ==
- García, Mélida; de Camps, Miguel (2004). Antología de la literatura gay en la República Dominicana (in Spanish). Santo Domingo: Editora Manatí. ISBN 978-99934-963-1-1.
