= LGBTQ literature in the United States =

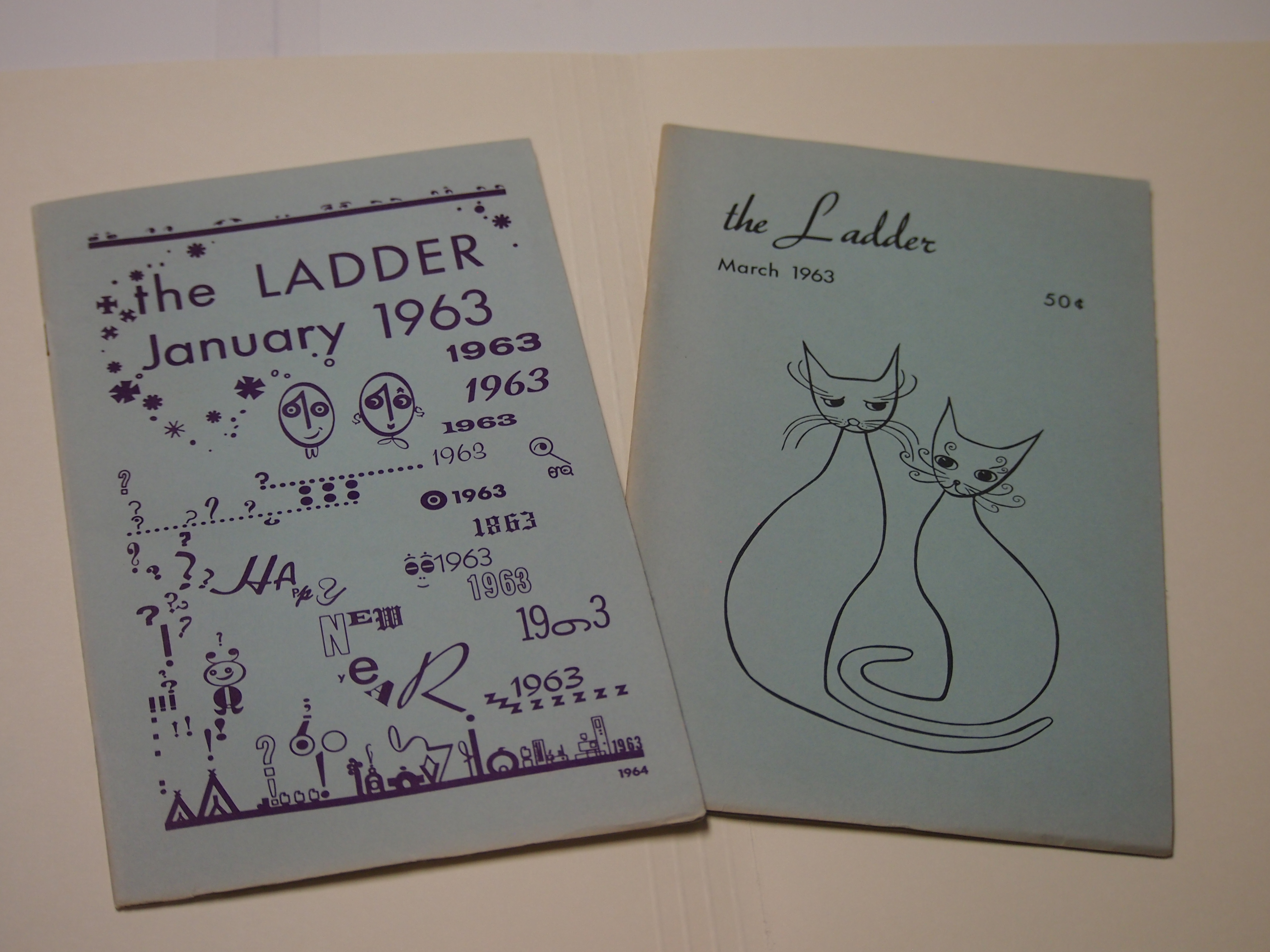
Two issues of The Ladder from the Smithsonian’s National Museum of American History, Archives Center.

LGBTQ literature in the United States refers to the body of literature either written by LGBTQ people in the United States or focusing on their experiences and identities. This includes fiction such as novels, short stories, poetry and theatre as well as non-fiction such as works of history, literary criticism, essays and journalism.

The historical lack of open, sophisticated discussion on LGBTQ sexuality leads to contemporary disagreements over what and who should labeled as such. Views of sexuality have changed drastically since the founding of the United States which makes historical writing on love and sex highly interpretive by a modern audience.

There exists debate over whether to categorize famous American writers such as Emily Dickinson, Walt Whitman, or Herman Melville as "gay" despite each having intimate relationships with members of the same sex. Regardless, queer individuals have contributed significantly to America's literary development.

Early queer-coded novels in America include Ormond: or the Secret Witness (1799) by Charles Brockden Brown, Ethel's Love Life (1859) by Margaret Jane Mussey Sweat and Cecil Dreeme (1861) by Theodore Wintrop. The identity of the first "explicit" LGBTQ novel is disputed, but considered by some scholars to be A Marriage Below Zero (1889) by Alan Dale.

The mid-twentieth century saw more openly LGBTQ writing, particularly after the Stonewall riots and the sexual revolution. Pioneers of such writing prior to Stonewall include James Baldwin, Edythe D. Eyde, Allen Ginsberg and Djuna Barnes.

== Early history ==
Despite far reaching global histories, little writing authored by LGBTQ individuals in North America survives prior to the eighteenth century. This can be attributed to the largely oral traditions of indigenous Americans and the marginalization of same-sex relationships in European colonies. Much of early American literature was religious in nature, and most colonial religious communities had strict laws against sodomy. There are many early second hand accounts of queer sexuality in America, from observations on Native American two-spirits by Spanish conquistadors to documents recording sodomy cases in colonial courts.

First-hand accounts by LGBTQ individuals are rarer, but do exist. In 1653, Puritan minister Michael Wigglesworth wrote in his diaries of his attraction to his male pupils: “…and such filthy lust also flowing from my fond affection to my pupils whiles in their presence on the third day after noon that I confess myself an object of God’s loathing as my sin is of my own and pray God make it so more to me.”

=== Queer-coded works ===
Particularly in the early American republic, the concept of LGBTQ sexuality or identity was not openly discussed outside of condemnation. Queer themes in fictional works was often coded or implied rather than stated directly.

Close relationships between fictional and real life figures of the same sex were often labeled as romantic friendships. This term has been used to describe homoerotic letters exchanged between John Laurens and founding father Alexander Hamilton, as well as many American women who lived together in the late 18th century such as Connecticut writers Abigail Smith and Sarah Pierce.

Late 18th century literature saw a genre identified by historian Sal Nicolazzo as “transmasculine,” wherein women occupied men’s roles. This genre occurred both in real life biographies of “warrior women” in British and American newspapers, and in novels such as Tabitha Terney’s Female Quixotism (1801) and The History of Constantius and Pulchera (1789). While not explicitly transgender, these novels depicted female characters in subversive roles as soldiers and sometimes as sailors.

== Mid-20th century ==
During the 1940-60s, more openly LGBTQ books began appearing, although many were censored. These include

- Giovanni's Room by James Baldwin
- The Price of Salt by Patricia Highsmith

These works were important because they portrayed LQBTQ people as complex, rather than basing them on homophobic stereotypes.

== Current day ==
=== Common themes ===
- Identity and self discovery
- Relationships and family
- Social issues
- Everyday life

=== Common genres ===
- Young adult fiction
- Romance novels
- Fantasy and science fiction
- Mystery and thriller
- Graphic novels
- Memoirs and autobiographies

== See also ==
- American Library Association Rainbow Book List
- Black lesbian literature in the United States
- LGBTQ Latino literature
- LGBTQ literature
- LGBTQ themes in American mainstream comics
- Proposed bans of LGBTQ-themed books in the United States
