= Dominican Vudú =

Religion from the Dominican Republic

Dominican Vudú, or Dominican Voodoo (Spanish: Vudú Dominicano), popularly known as Las 21 Divisiones (The 21 Divisions), is a heavily syncretic religion of African-Caribbean origin which developed in the former Spanish colony of Santo Domingo on the island of Hispaniola.

== Beliefs ==
- Anaisa Pye, the Misterio or lwa of love and happiness. She is syncretized with St. Anne, mother of Mary. Her feast day is July 26.
- Belie Belcan, the Loa of justice and protection against demons. He is syncretized with St. Michael, the Archangel. His feast day is September 29.
- Candelo sé Difé, Loa of fire, also a warrior and protector spirit. Considered to be one of the Ogou, syncretized with St. Charles Borromeo. His feast day is November 4.
- Santa Marta Dominadora, or Filomena Lubana, the Loa responsible for dominion over men. She is syncretized with St. Martha. Her feast day is July 29.
- Ogun Balenyo, the Loa of warriors and soldiers. He is syncretized with St. James the Great. His feast day is July 25.
- Baron, the Loa of death. He is syncretized with St. Elias. His feast day is November 2.
- Metresili, the Loa of love, beauty, and wealth. She is syncretized with the Mater Dolorosa (Our Lady of Dolors).
- Santa Barbara Africana or Ezili Dantor, The main loa (or lwa) or senior spirit of the Petro family. She is syncretized with Black Madonna.

== Characteristics ==
Dominican Vudú is practiced through a "Tcha-Tcha" (Maraca—which means "rattle") lineage. In Haiti, Voodoo has come about and become more popular through another lineage known as the "Asson". However, before the "Asson", the "Tcha-Tcha" lineage was the prominent lineage in Haiti. The Dominican brujeria "21 Division" is the oldest in the Western Hemisphere practiced by Dominicans since the early 16th century. This since before the first Haitian anscestor first stepped foot on the island of Hispainola. This prior to the Devastation of Osorio. As a matter of fact, the first mention of "vodou" in Saint Domingue today Haiti was of a Dominican man named "Don Pedro" described by the french traveler Mederic Louis Elie Saint-Méry in 1789. This dominican man was the creation of the Haitian vodou Petwo (Petro) rite.

Dominican Vudú practitioners are often called Caballos ('Horses'), Brujos ('Witch doctors'), or Servidores ('Servants'), but they are also known as Papa Bokos and Papa Loa (priest); and Mama Mambos and Mama Loa (priestess). One who has obtained this title has gone through the last and highest level of initiation, which can take anywhere between three and nine days and nights, as well as have spent a time working for the community.
