= LGBTQ literature in New Zealand =

LGBTQ literature in New Zealand is defined as literature written by New Zealand authors that involves plots, themes, or characters that are part of or related to sexual diversity.

== 20th century ==
=== Beginning of the century ===
==== Gay literature ====
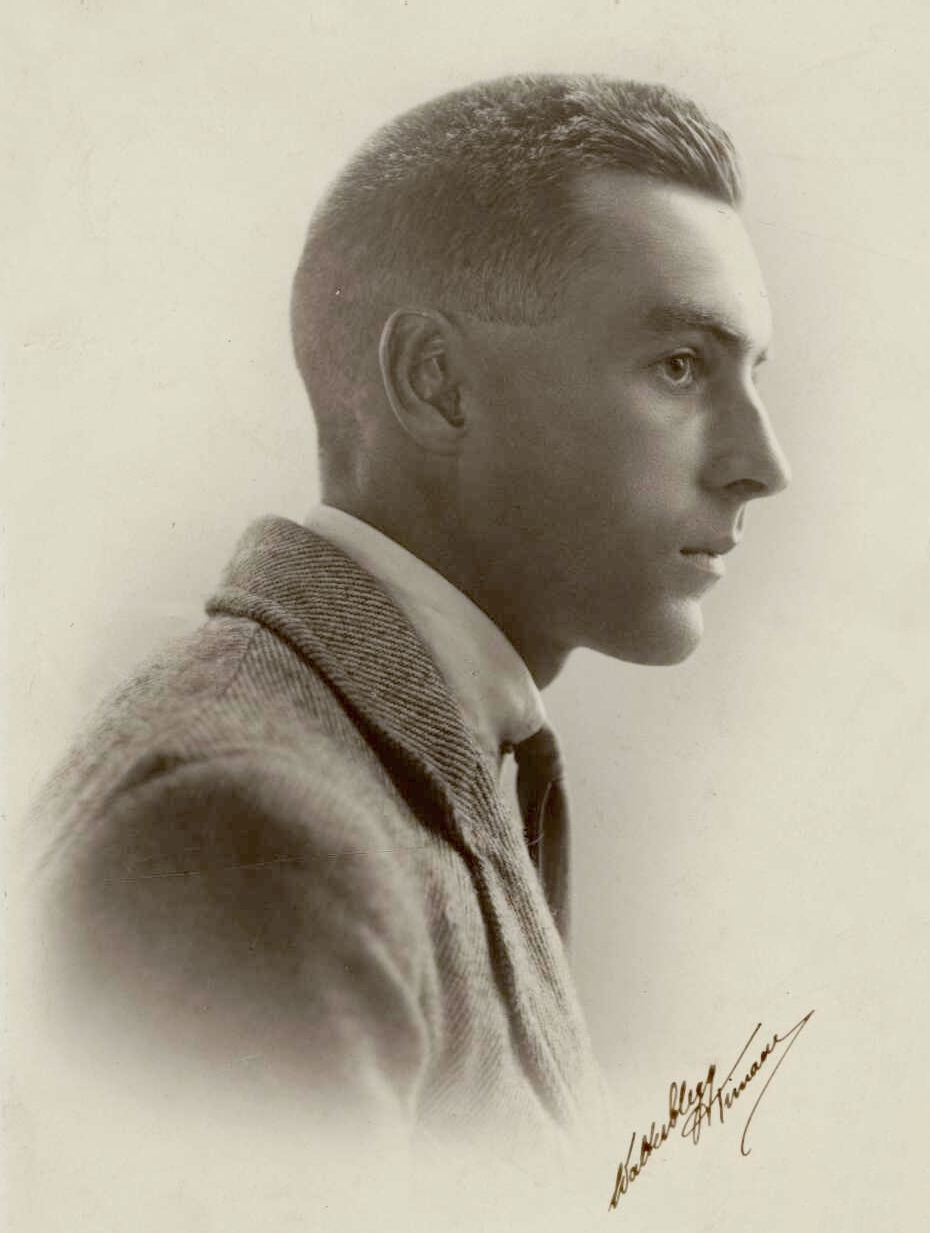
Walter D'Arcy Cresswell in 1921

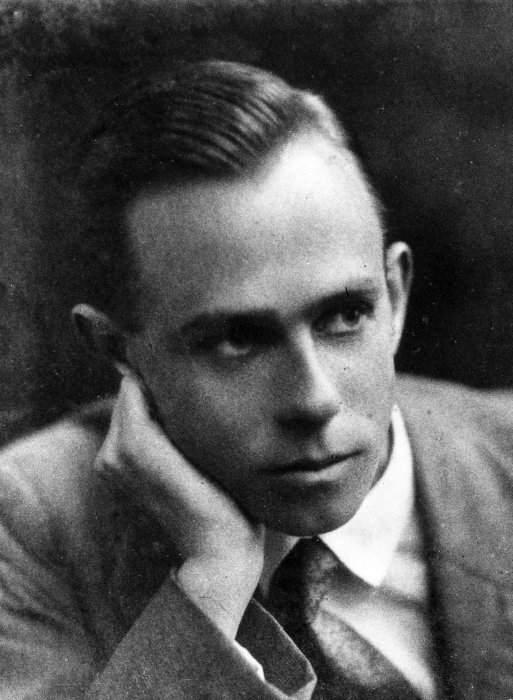
New Zealand writer Norrys Davey, whose pseudonym Frank Sargeson would later become his official name

In the 20th century, gay literature in New Zealand was heavily influenced by conservative laws and restrictive attitudes, with many works remaining private or under pseudonyms, and others censored. Among the writers and poets who were part of the New Zealand literary subculture were Walter D'Arcy Cresswell, Frank Sargeson, James Courage, and Peter Wells.

Unlike Australia's long history, larger population, and more prosperous pastoral society, New Zealand has produced a smaller literature. Its Puritanism viewed homosexuality more abhorrently than in Australia, although some New Zealand critics still dismiss writers known to have homosexual tendencies as "effeminate."

Walter D'Arcy Cresswell, a twentieth-century poet, challenged norms by openly supporting Walt Whitman and exalting classical Greek masculine ideals as well as biblical love that transcended love for women. In his work, he questioned the rigid relationship between sex and gender in New Zealand society and promoted homoeroticism, but he was marginalised by a homophobic critical establishment. Cresswell criticised the rigid relationship between sex and gender:

In New Zealand, the feminine and the sentimental are supposed to be confined to the sex to which these attributes are deemed most appropriate. The same is true of the masculine and the insensitive.

— (Margaret MacMillan, 1948).

The New Zealander writer James Courage was an LGBT writer in New Zealand with a more explicit representation of homosexuality in his work, presenting at the beginning of this play Private History, which premiered in London in 1938.

Frank Sargeson, in his early works, depicted relationships between men that English readers interpreted as having overtones related to homosexuality, while New Zealanders saw his stories as examples of realism.

==== Lesbian literature ====
In 1907, writer Kathleen Beauchamp left for England after her father read her lesbian story, Slight Loves (signed "K. Mansfield").

In 1928, Radclyffe Hall's lesbian novel The Well of Loneliness was published in the United Kingdom, but remained banned in New Zealand until 1936.

Queer literature

Author Katherine Mansfield, born in New Zealand in 1888 was known to have long term relationships with both men and women. Her writing has been reinterpreted in recent times through this lens.

=== Mid century ===
In the mid-20th century, New Zealand writer James Courage became known LGBT community with works that marked a milestone in the representation of the LGBT community in New Zealand literature. Although his best-known novel, The Young Have Secrets from 1954, did not directly address this theme, other works of his dealt more frankly with homosexual desire and relationships between men in a repressive society, such as his 1959 novel A Way of Love, considered the first openly LGBT novel in the country's history. However, due to its provocative content, the novel was banned in 1962.

=== End of the century ===
==== Gay literature ====
The shift in New Zealand's literary disposition toward LGBT issues became most evident with the publications of Frank Sargeson, whose 1972 work A Game of Hide and Seek addressed sexual preferences in a more direct and exaggerated manner, generating controversy and a re-evaluation of his work in new contexts, and the publication of Peter Wells' stories in Dangerous Desires in 1991, which won the Reed Prize for Fiction. This volume directly addressed homosexual desire in various subversive situations and styles, contextualised around the issue of AIDS, marking a milestone in New Zealand literature and signalling a shift in the representation of the LGBT community.

The New Zealand writer Witi Ihimaera came out as gay in 1995 with the semi-biographical novel Nights in the Gardens of Spain, describing it as a show of loyalty to its gay audience. The Uncle's Story, from 2000, is a novel by Witi Ihimaera that addresses the hostility towards same-sex relationships in Maori society during the 20th century.

==== Lesbian literature ====
===== Publications =====
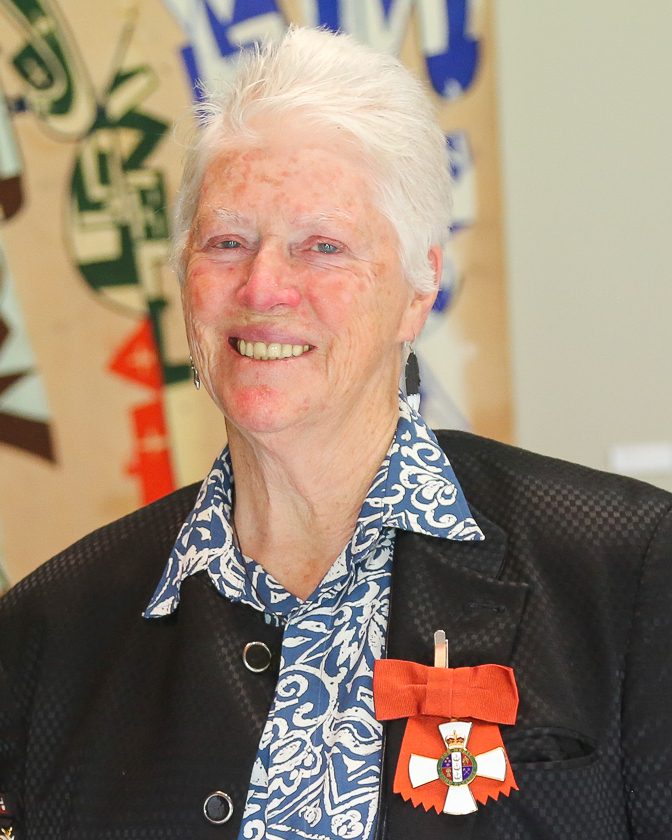
Miriam Saphira, author of the first book on lesbianism in New Zealand

In December 1973, Wellington's SHE group began publishing the first national lesbian magazine, The Circle (renamed Lesbian Feminist Circle in 1977).

In 1984, the first book on lesbianism was published in New Zealand, titled Amazon Mothers and written by Miriam Saphira.

===== Novels =====
The development of the lesbian novel in Australia during the last two decades of the 20th century is a phenomenon that has yet to find an equal in New Zealand, although Renée stands out as a prolific New Zealand lesbian writer with several published works. Her writing style is varied and direct. In addition to a series of plays, she has produced three books of fiction: a collection of stories entitled Finding Ruth (1987), and the novels Willy Nilly (1990) and Daisy and Lily (1993).

In 1989, Frances Cherry published Dancing with Strings, a landmark novel considered the first New Zealand lesbian novel.

On the other hand, Beryl Fletcher's two feminist novels (The Word Burners, 1991; The Iron Mouth, 1993) explicitly consider lesbian themes and impulses as an important aspect within the New Zealand context of feminine textuality.

In 1998, Paula Boock received the Children's Book of the Year award at the New Zealand Government Publishing Awards for her young adult novel, Dare, Truth or Promise, which addresses lesbian themes. However, this award was not without controversy, as the Christian Heritage Party criticized the work's subject matter.

===== Short stories =====
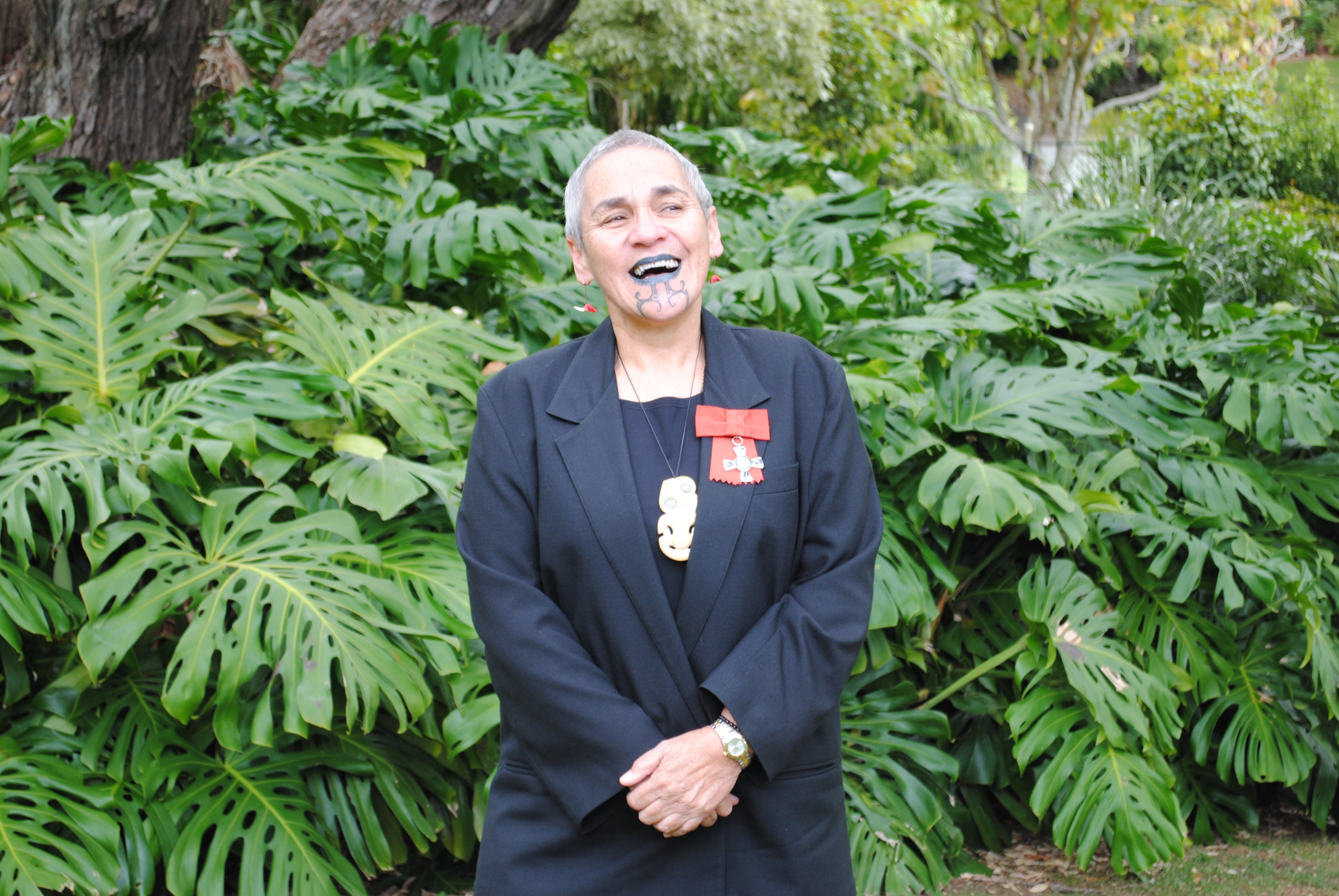
Ngahuia Te Awekotuku, Maori academic and writer, representative of New Zealand lesbian history and literature

In New Zealand, there are feminist and lesbian writers who use short stories as a way to explore various issues. Although short stories have generally been a realistic form, some lesbian writers in New Zealand have found it conducive to fantasy and the expression of vivid and constructive dreams. Furthermore, these authors have found a new focus on language itself, exploring its inherent capacity for deconstruction and reframing, thereby challenging language as a patriarchal property. This lesbian and feminist writing in New Zealand is characterized by a willingness to transgress boundaries, seek inclusive experiences, and form creative alliances in its quest to explore themes related to gender and sexuality.

Two anthologies from this period that include work by New Zealand feminist and lesbian writers are Subversive Acts: New Writing by New Zealand Women, which encompasses both heterosexual and lesbian work, emphasizing the continuities within women's experience, and The Exploding Frangipani: Lesbian Writing from Australia and New Zealand, an anthology of lesbian writing from Australia and New Zealand that emphasizes the connections present in women's experience, regardless of whether it is heterosexual or lesbian in nature. From New Zealand, Susan Sayer, Nancy Stone, Julie Glamuzina, Louise Simone, and Sandy Hall are writers of this genre.

In addition, these anthologies also feature the works of native New Zealand women writers, such as Marewa P. Glover and Ngahuia Te Awekotuku.

== 21st century ==
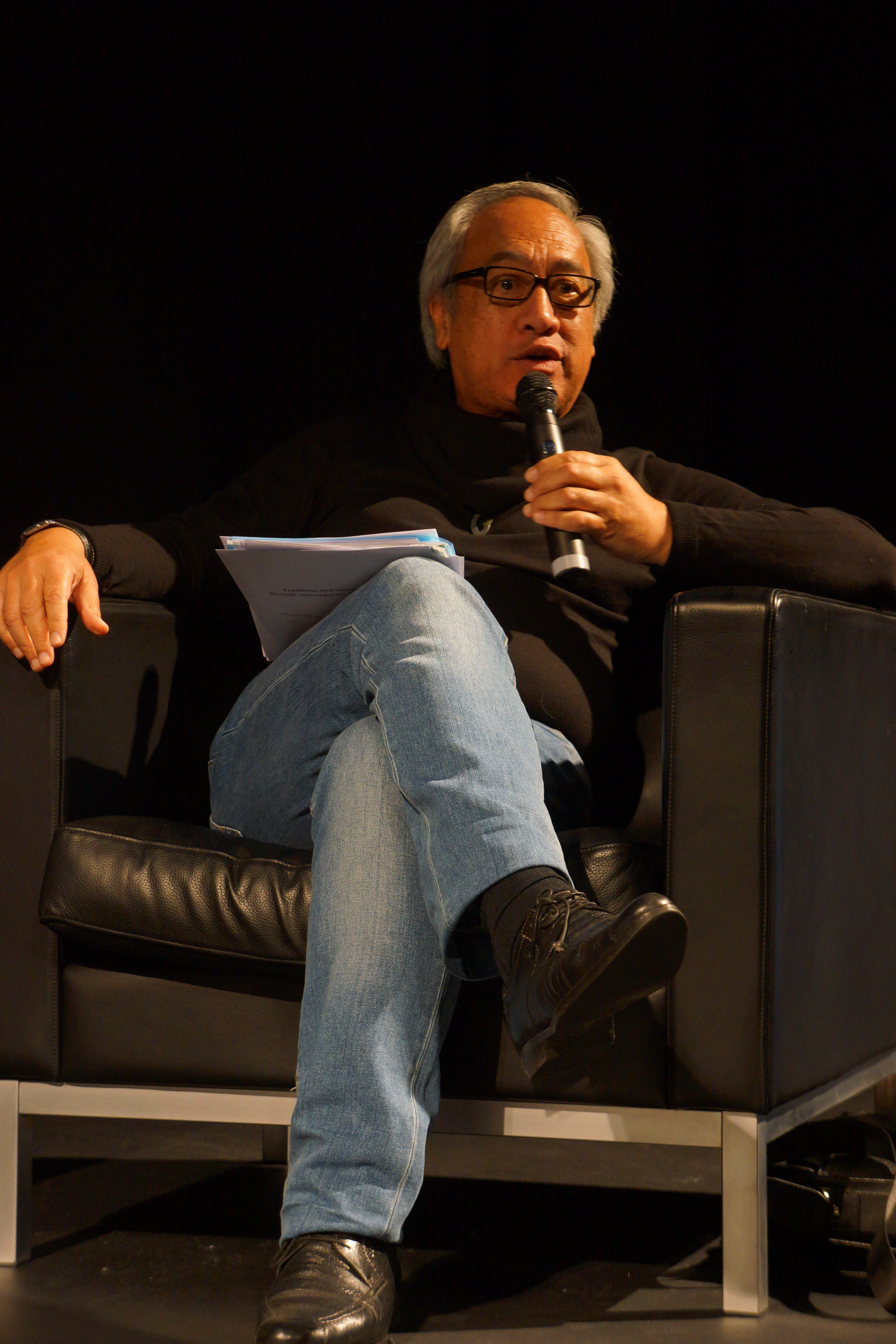
Witi Ihimaera in 2012

On 21 February 2016, the first edition of the LGBT literary festival "Samesame But Different" opened in Auckland.
