= Macky Corbalán =

Argentine poet and journalist (1963–2014)

- Born: 19 June 1963; Cutral Có, Neuquén Province, Argentina
- Died: 13 September 2014 (aged 51); Neuquén, Neuquén Province, Argentina
- Occupations: Journalist, editor
- Partner: Valeria Flores
- Writing career
- Language: Spanish
- Years active: 1980s–2014
- Genre: Poetry
- Notable works: La pasajera de arena, Inferno

Macky Corbalán (19 June 1963 – 13 September 2014) was an Argentine poet and journalist. She was a member of the lesbian feminist group Fugitivas del Desierto and published the newsletter La Sociedad de las Extranas with her partner Valeria Flores.

== Early life and education ==
Macky Corbalán was born on 19 June 1963, in Cutral Có, Neuquén Province.

In the 1980s, she was invited to contribute to the Neuquén poetry anthology Voces a mano. Soon after, she won the Raúl González Tuñón national prize for young poets alongside Raúl Mansilla. She earned a bachelor's degree in social work.

== Career ==
Corbalán worked as a journalist and was on the editorial staff of Coirón magazine towards the end of the military dictatorship. She was a co-founder of the group Poesía en Trámite in the late 1980s. Her first collection of poetry, La pasajera de arena, was published in 1992. She developed her own poetic voice and came to be called "one of the most original voices south of the Colorado River".

Corbalán was active with the lesbian feminist group Fugitivas del Desierto. Between 2004 and 2007, she published the monthly lesbian feminist newsletter La Sociedad de las Extranas with her partner, activist Valeria Flores. The title is based on an excerpt from Virginia Woolf: "and we, who will remain strangers, will experiment", from the book Three Guineas. Corbalán also founded independent publishing houses for lesbian and feminist works, including La Mondonga Dark.

Following a months-long illness, she died in Neuquén on 13 September 2014. A collection of her poetry, Conversaciones en la noche del amor was released posthumously in 2017. In 2022, she was honored in a "historical reparation" by the Collective of Writers of Cutral Co and Plaza Huincul.

== Selected works ==
- La pasajera de arena (1992)
- Inferno (1999)
- Como mil flores (2007)
- El acuerdo (2012)
- Anima(i)s (2013)
- Conversaciones en la noche del amor (2017, posthumous)
- La Rama (2022, posthumous)

=== Anthologies ===
- Poesía en la Fisura, with Daniel Freidemberg (1995)
- Antología de Poetas de la Patagonia (2006)
- Poetas Argentinas (1961-1980) (2008)
- Poesía del siglo XX en Argentina (2010)
- Poesía (1992-2013) (2015, posthumous)
