= Las dos caras del deseo =

1994 novel by Carmen Ollé

- Author: Carmen Ollé
- Language: Spanish
- Genre: Fiction
- Publisher: PEISA
- Publication date: 1994
- Publication place: Peru
- Pages: 291

Las dos caras del deseo (English: The Two Faces of Desire) is a novel by Peruvian writer Carmen Ollé, published in 1994. The plot follows the story of a teacher named Ada who begins to feel a strong attraction for another woman, but who then decides to forgo her desire and migrate to the United States, where she later begins to feel liberated. The central themes of the novel are lesbian desire and the character's search for her real identity.

The novel is considered representative of the Latin American LGBTQ literature. It was one of the first Peruvian works to explore relationships between women without the prejudices which were often evident in earlier novels that addressed the issue. According to the author, the novel was influenced by the work of Patricia Highsmith, the author of Carol (1952).

== Synopsis ==
Ada is a professor of literature in a university in Lima. She is dissatisfied with her current life and feels unable to get out of the stagnation. She spends her days thinking about her ex-husband, questioning the divorce, and in the sexual encounters with another teacher named Quiroga. One day she meets Eiko, a romantic partner of a friend of hers named Martha, and she begins to feel a strong attraction to her. Ada tries to control her desire, which coincides with the failure of the launch of her writing career.

In the face of the frustration she feels with her current situation, Ada emigrates to the United States with the help of her ex-husband. However, her status as an undocumented immigrant leads to difficulties at the workplace, while she continues to suppress her desire on Eiko. She later moves to Greenwich Village in the New York metropolitan area, which is a recognized LGBTQ neighborhood. There she manages to shake off the memory of Eiko and begins a career as a writer. She meets Maria Cristina, with whom she has an intimate encounter, which makes Ada feel the moment of liberation she was looking for.

== Critical reception ==
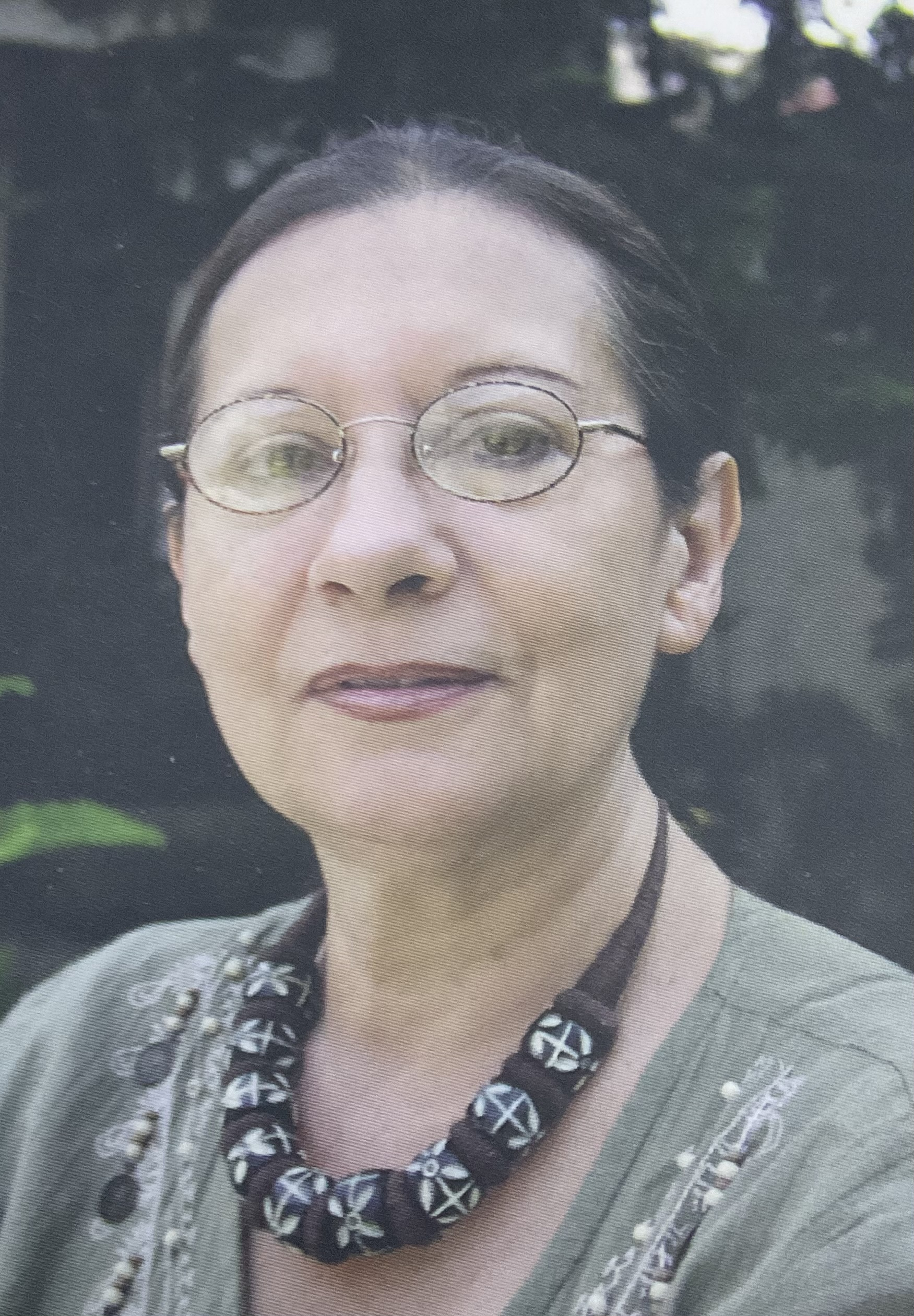
Carmen Ollé in 2015

According to researcher Richard Leonardo, the book was one of the first in Peru to address the subject of lesbianism and was unique for representing relationship between the same sex without negative stereotypes, unlike other Peruvian works of the time. As per the author, Carmen Ollé, she preferred to portray characters precisely to break with the view on such relationships.

Academic Susana Reisz affirms that Ada is an ambiguous character, who is not pigeonholed in to an established narrative, and her sexual orientation is never explicitly addressed. The title, according to Reisz, can be understood on the basis of this duality, a woman's desire that can be inclined at certain times towards men and at others time towards women.

Author Bruno Ysla Heredia indicates that the title of the work, in addition to referring to the sexual desire of the protagonist, represents the internal conflict faced by Ada between the desire that she feels and her wish to escape the dissatisfaction she feels with her life. Heredia also points out the political symbolism or relevance of the novel to the period of the 1990s. The initial state of Ada can be seen as a representation of the political apathy that prevailed at the time and of alpinchism, a vulgar Peruvian term that was used to denote the tendency to ignore political or social problems.
