= De mangos y albaricoques =

1996 theater play by Javier Stanziola

De mangos y abarricoques
- Author: Javier Stanziola
- Language: Spanish
- Genre: Theatre
- Publication date: 1996
- Publication place: Panama
- Awards: Ricardo Miró National Literature Contest (1996)

De mangos y abarricoques (English: Mangoes and apricots) is a play by Panamanian writer Javier Stanziola. The play won the Ricardo Miró National Literature Contest in 1996. The plot follows a young man named Fabricio, who leaves Panama for Miami in order to live his life as a gay man without the fear of his family finding out. However, he is later forced to confront his mother and brother when they come to visit him.

Among the themes explored in the play are homophobia, the search for love, double standards, and family relationships. Years after its premiere, Stanziola described the work as "an exploration of the world of lies and open secrets that exists in all families, especially Panamanian ones".

The play has been staged on several occasions, including at the National Theatre of Panama. Productions of the work have highlighted its subject matter as a catalyst for social debate regarding taboos, the promotion of respect for sexual diversity, and the elimination of stereotypes.

== Synopsis ==
Fabricio is a young Panamanian man living in the 1990s. He left Panama some time earlier for Miami in order to live his life as a gay man freely and escape the pressure he felt from both his family and society due to his sexual orientation. However, his tranquillity is disrupted by a visit from his mother and brother, as Fabricio fears that they will discover his homosexuality.

== Background and publication ==
De mangos y albaricoques was writer Javier Stanziola's first literary work. He wrote it when he was 26 years old and pursuing a doctorate in Miami. Around the time of the play's publication, Stanziola decided to reveal his homosexuality to his family, who had previously been unaware of it. The disclosure caused significant conflict within the family, although they subsequently came to accept it.

The play won the 1996 Ricardo Miró National Literature Contest in the theatre category. Because of its theme, the work generated controversy at the time. However, the decision to award the prize was defended by the Venezuelan playwright Isaac Chocrón, a member of the jury, who stated in reference to the play:"It was time for someone to write a clear and straightforward play". As a result of the controversy over its subject matter, the play was not staged for eight years by the decision of the local authorities.

In 2017, a new version of the play was staged, which reduced the number of actors in the play to three.

== See also ==
- LGBTQ literature in Panama
