= Belie Belcan =

Spirit in Dominican Vudú

- Venerated in: Dominican Vudú, Folk Catholicism, Sance
- Patronage: Justice, protection against evil, protection against enemies

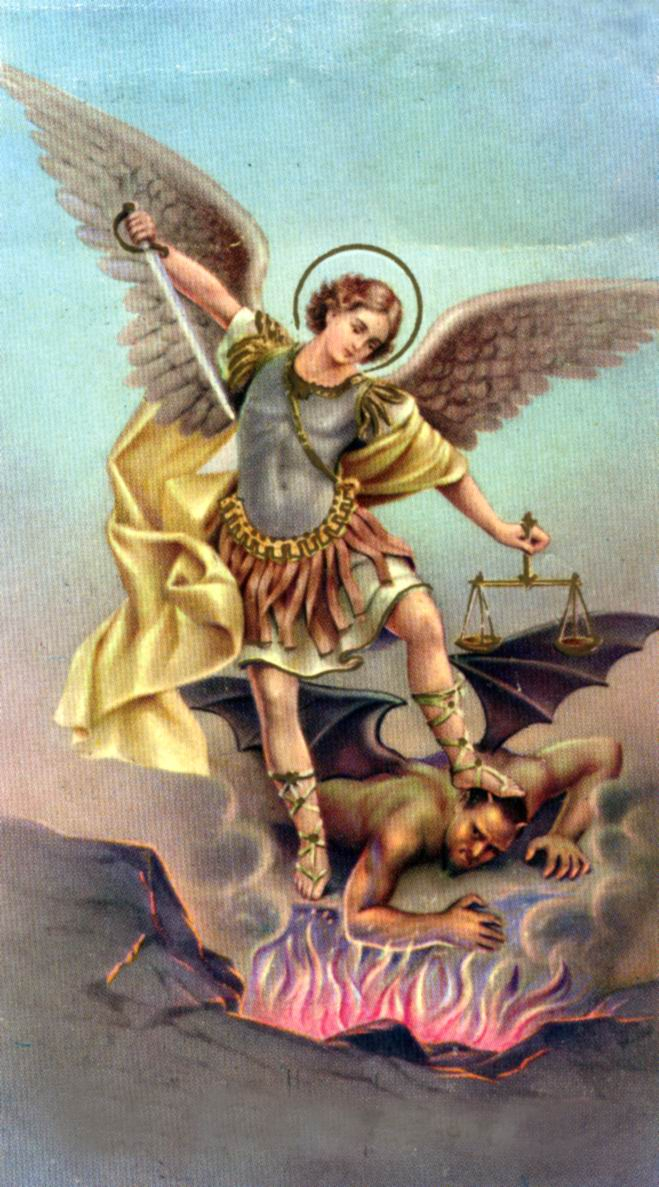
A painting of St Michael, synchretised with Belie Belcan.

Belie Belcan is a very popular loa within 21 Divisiones (Dominican Vudú) and Sance.

== Information ==
He is considered the patron saint of justice who defends people against evil and enemies within the 21 Divisions. He is considered very polite, understanding, and protective by his devotees. In Roman Catholicism, he is syncretized with Saint Michael the Archangel. He is said to work very well with Anaisa Pye, a female loa syncretized with Saint Anne. Therefore, in Dominican households, one will often find images of Saint Michael next to images of Saint Anne.

== Sources ==
- https://web.archive.org/web/20090508190137/http://www.papabokoylas21divisiones.com/beliebelcan.html
- https://web.archive.org/web/20090601200554/http://www.ezilikonnen.com/dominican/belie-belcan.html
- https://web.archive.org/web/20170911181248/http://www.mamamamboylas21divisiones.com/belie-belcan.html
