= LGBTQ literature in Panama =

Panama's LGBT literature, defined as works written by Panamanian authors featuring plots or characters that belong to or relate to sexual diversity, boasts a far shorter literary tradition than that of neighboring countries such as Costa Rica and Colombia. One factor behind this disparity is writers' reluctance to publish LGBT-themed work within a society where homosexuality remains shrouded in taboo and prejudice. Nevertheless, interest in writing exploring sexual diversity has grown in recent years, alongside the emergence of a new generation of authors addressing the subject openly.

For most of the twentieth century, depictions of homosexuality in Panamanian literature overwhelmingly relied on stereotyped male characters displaying traits traditionally coded as feminine. This trend began to shift with works such as De parte interesada (1972), a homoerotic poetry collection by Agustín Del Rosario that became the first LGBT-themed literary piece to win a national award. Other openly LGBT poets active during this period included Juan Dal Vera, Roberto McKay, and Bertalicia Peralta.

In prose fiction, landmark works emerged from Tristán Solarte, alongside the short fiction output produced by Enrique Jaramillo Levi starting in the 1970s. Another standout late-twentieth-century work is the theatrical play De mangos y albaricoques. The text earned Javier Stanziola the 1996 Ricardo Miró National Literature Prize and follows the life of a young gay man who emigrates abroad.

The twenty-first century ushered in a new cohort of openly LGBT writers who began articulating ideas about sexual diversity far more unreservedly across their work. A prominent figure among them is Javier Alvarado, a poet recipient of multiple international literary awards. In fiction, key publications include Javier Stanziola's Hombres enlodados (2013), while nonfiction scholarship features academics such as Juan Ríos Vega.

== 20th century ==
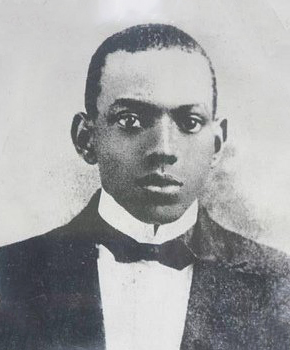
Gaspar Octavio Hernández in 1918.

During the early decades of the twentieth century, sexual diversity was concealed by Panamanian society, making it difficult to locate definitive evidence confirming the homosexuality of any local writer from that era. Nevertheless, rumors circulated regarding the sexual orientation of public figures such as poet Gaspar Octavio Hernández. Scholars including Luis Wong Vega have identified undercurrents of personal ambiguity intertwined with profound melancholy throughout Hernández's verse, though the exact source of this emotion remains unconfirmed.

The first confirmed openly LGBT Panamanian writer is José María Vásquez, a little-known poet originally from Colón. Vásquez expressed his sexuality across numerous poems, most of which his family burned after his death out of rejection of their homoerotic themes. Surviving works include "Versos, versos raros", composed in the 1930s, which contains the following lines:

Verse,

Strange verse, Like my life, Afflicted by the same grief that made Verlaine immortal. A fragrant bundle of lines Torn from my inner rosebushes, Full of sunlight, Of youth, Of indifference,

And of glory.

Mid‑century poetry is defined by Edison Simmons, an openly gay writer who relocated to Paris at a young age. One of his most notable works is the poem "Oda al Brown", written in reference to the gay boxer Panamá Al Brown. Also from the mid‑twentieth century is Tristán Solarte's crime novel El ahogado (1957), regarded as a literary classic. Its central character, a bisexual man named Rafael, is now recognised as one of the most prominent LGBT figures in Panamanian literature. In the novel, Rafael is found drowned, and a doctor surnamed Martínez launches an investigation into his death, uncovering his sexual relationships with men. While the book explicitly describes Rafael's romantic encounters with women, it provides no explicit details about his relations with men.

The late 1960s saw the rise of a circle of poets educated at the University of Panama who openly acknowledged their homosexuality and explored this theme in their work, albeit subtly. The group consisted of Agustín Del Rosario, Juan Dal Vera, Roberto McKay, and Bertalicia Peralta. In 1972, Del Rosario won the Ricardo Miró National Literature Prize for his poetry collection De parte interesada. This marked the first homoerotic literary work ever to receive a national literary award in Panama. His victory proved highly controversial and sparked a wave of homophobic criticism targeting both Del Rosario and his writing. Del Rosario handled homoerotic themes with delicate subtlety, exemplified in verses such as "Reencuentro VII", which reads:

It is good to sleep beside him, resting, resting,

my head upon his chest, feeling the breath beneath like an underground river, and his hand wandering over your hips, drawing arabesques again and again, murmuring to you

how soft your skin is, how soft.

Bertalicia Peralta was one of the earliest female writers to explore female homoeroticism in her work, as seen in lines such as "How to deny the charm of this woman with fine, half-parted lips," and in her poems titled "Sappho." Fellow writer Bessy Reyna belonged to the same era; her verse also examined lesbian love, though with far greater ambiguity than Peralta's work.

The 1970s also saw a collection of LGBT-themed short stories by Enrique Jaramillo Levi, compiled within his volumes Duplicaciones (1973), El búho que dejó de latir (1974), and Renuncia al tiempo (1975). Standout tales include "The Spectacle," which follows three women bound by their shared deceased lover; the trio chooses to pursue relationships with one another to cope with their grief. Another story, "Come Back, Irma," centers on a man who fills the void left by his former partner by becoming intimate with another man. The title piece "Renuncia al tempo" depicts an incestuous romance between two female cousins that ends in tragedy when jealousy drives one to murder the other. While Jaramillo explores queer themes throughout these short stories, homosexuality is generally portrayed negatively and linked to paraphilias across the collection.

Other openly LGBT poets who rose to prominence during this period included Pedro Correa Vásquez, Gustavo Batista, and Euclides Meléndez. Though Correa Vásquez did not write explicitly about homosexuality himself, he helped promote poetry by LGBT authors through local media outlets.

In 1996, Javier Stanziola shook Panama's literary landscape by winning the Ricardo Miró National Literature Prize for his LGBT play De mangos y albaricoques. The narrative follows a young man named Fabricio, who leaves Panama for Miami to live openly as gay without fear of his family discovering his identity. He is later forced to confront his mother and brother when the pair travel to visit him. The play sparked widespread controversy upon its release due to its subject matter, yet the jury upheld its award. Venezuelan playwright Isaac Chocrón, a jury member, defended the work and stated of De mangos y albaricoques: "It was high time someone wrote an unflinching, straightforward piece."

On the academic research front, scholarly interest in this field remained minimal throughout the twentieth century, with related publications limited almost exclusively to university student theses, mostly written by law majors. The earliest such work was "Homosexuality in Comparative Law," released in 1982. Additional research topics covered criminology's connections to homosexuality and male sex work.

== 21st Century ==
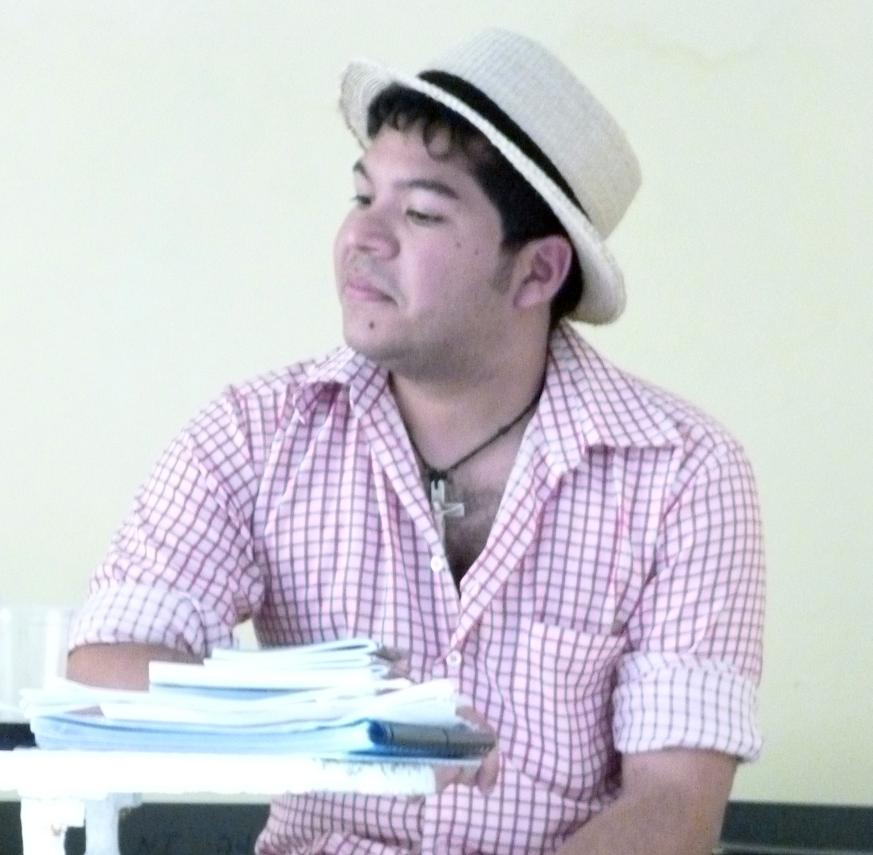
Javier Alvarado in 2013.

The turn of the new century brought a growing number of Panamanian LGBT writers willing to explore sexual diversity in their work, though authors from older generations still feared professional repercussions for addressing these subjects. One of the most prominent voices of this millennial cohort is Javier Alvarado, a poet awarded multiple international literary competitions who centers his sexual identity throughout his writing. An excerpt from his poem "La pintura al otro lado de la pared" illustrates this perspective:

I must be a fairy softening the muscles of your face,

or a small pedestal where your body might rest; you may see me as an ordinary gay man

or a repressed whore, and you could be my whole sky…

Within prose fiction, established writers such as Enrique Jaramillo Levi continued crafting sexually diverse characters across short story collections including Para más señas (2005) and En un instante y otras eternidades (2006). Meanwhile, Salas Fonseca depicted the harsh living conditions endured by Panamanian LGBT people in prior decades in the stage play La Madrid (2005), named after one of the country's twentieth-century venues that welcomed LGBT patrons.

In 2013, Javier Stanziola released the novel Hombres enlodados. It follows Jota Jota, a teenage boy growing up in 1980s Panama who faces discrimination for rejecting the era's rigid masculine norms and obsessing over culturally feminine pastimes, most notably beauty pageants. The novel received the Ricardo Miró National Literature Prize for Best Novel of the Year.

LGBT poets who rose to prominence on Panama's literary scene starting in the 2010s include Keylon Román, Wesleys Madrid, Reynaldo Daniel García, and Rita Arosemena Peretz. Young adult literature also began featuring LGBT characters, such as in Linda Astwood's novel Nunca, nunca me sueltes (2019).

Scholarly documentation of Panamanian LGBT lived experiences expanded significantly beginning in the 2010s. Juan Ríos Vega stands out as a leading researcher in this field, with publications including the essay "La Conciencia de la Mariposa Transnacional: Para Entender la Homosexualidad en Panamá" (2017), plus full-length volumes Historias desde el Sexilio (2018) and Testimonios de LGBTIQ+ de Panamá (2023). These books compile firsthand accounts from diverse Panamanian LGBT people to examine discrimination, gender identity, conversion therapy, sexual violence, HIV-related rejection, and other critical subjects. Dr. Nelva Araúz Reyes is another academic who has published work examining these topics.

== See also ==
- LGBTQ culture in Panama
- LGBTQ literature in Colombia
