= LGBTQ Latino literature =

Form of Latino literature

LGBTQ Latino literature or queer Latino literature refers to literature that addresses the lives and experiences of members of the LGBTQ community who are of Latin-American descent. It falls under the umbrellas of Latino literature and LGBTQ literature. To be considered queer Latino literature, the author, subject matter, and or characters must be connected in some way to the LGBTQ and Latino communities; however that identity is not required to encompass the complete written work.

Many works of LGBTQ Latino literature are written by authors who have grown up or are living in the United States, such as Mexican Americans, Cuban Americans, and Puerto Ricans. Much of the literature is written in English, with some also written bilingually in English and Spanish.

Prominent authors include: Achy Obejas, Gloria Anzaldúa, Terri de la Peña, Carla Trujillo, Francisco X. Alarcón, Lorenzo Herrera y Lozano, Emanuel Xavier, Tatiana de la Tierra, Denise Frohman, Carlos Mock, Cherríe Moraga, Emma Pérez,

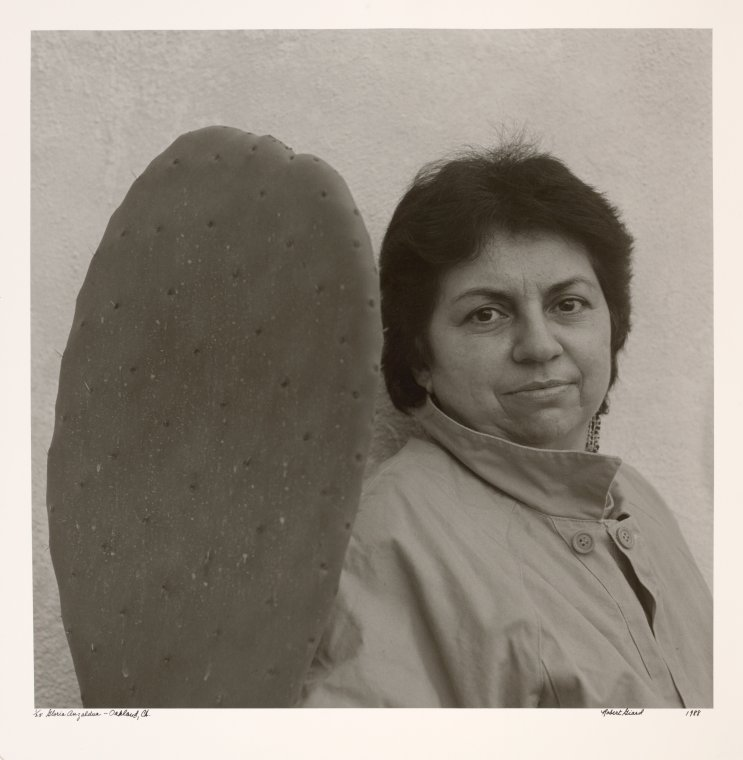
Gloria Anzaldua. Oakland, CA, 1988.

== Latino Queer theory ==
Queer theory was born as an academic study in the early 1990s used to address the growing representation of queer identities, where it originally branched out of gay/lesbian studies. Through their works, theorists such as the Chicana author Gloria Anzaldúa challenged the idea that heterosexuality is the norm or standard by arguing that sexualities and gender orientations exist and hold cultural practices different from heterosexuality and cis-normativity.

A professor of Mexican American and Latina/o/x Studies at the University of Texas, Michael Hames-Garcia, wrote on his experience with queer theory as a gay Chicano. He theorized that many queer studies that came out of the 1990s erased or forgotten to include Latinos, and that "people of color were to provide raw experience for white academics to theorize", but not to contribute to the field of study. Thus, he argues there is need to "revisit" the concept of queer theory through the lens of Latin-American identity, and that viewing Latino literature and other cultural practices through queer theory gives voice and understanding to previously marginalized voices. Another scholar in Latino Studies, Frank García, agrees with Hames-Garcia and the need for "selective specificity" when it comes to studying queer theory and connecting it to the Latin-American community. He argues that literature, alongside politics and academia, bring Latinos into the conversation of queerness.

The Chicana Feminist Movement made much of the growing representation possible for LGBTQ+ Latinos to gain a voice and recognition in Queer theory. The movement pushed authors and activist so much so that lesbian studies are the more advanced area of Latino Queer Theory and Literature.

== Types of literature and themes ==
=== Poetry ===
LGBTQ Latino authors have expressed themselves through poetry. According to Emilie L. Bergmann and Paul Julian Smith, poetry became a figurative "Underground Railroad", meaning if the reader understood the writings, it was for them, and they would be connected to the queer community.

Feminist and lesbian poetry are connected in many ways as they were born through the Chicana Feminist Movement; they are intertwined to the point that much of the scholarship and literature cannot separate them. The works of Lucha Corpi, Lorna Dee Cervantes, Pat Mora, Julia Alvarez, Rhina Espaillat, and many others were composed to combat patriarchy and establish a voice and their respective sexualities. Lesbian Latina poetry will also advocate for the "Latina Body", or the image of the female Latina, protecting their bodies and thus the feminine past and future. They also present poetry in different ways, some in free verse, others recalling long ago heritage by using a formal short-line Spanish format, (a form used extensively by Lucha Corpi), and others, such as Denise Frohman, use spoken word poetry/slam poetry.

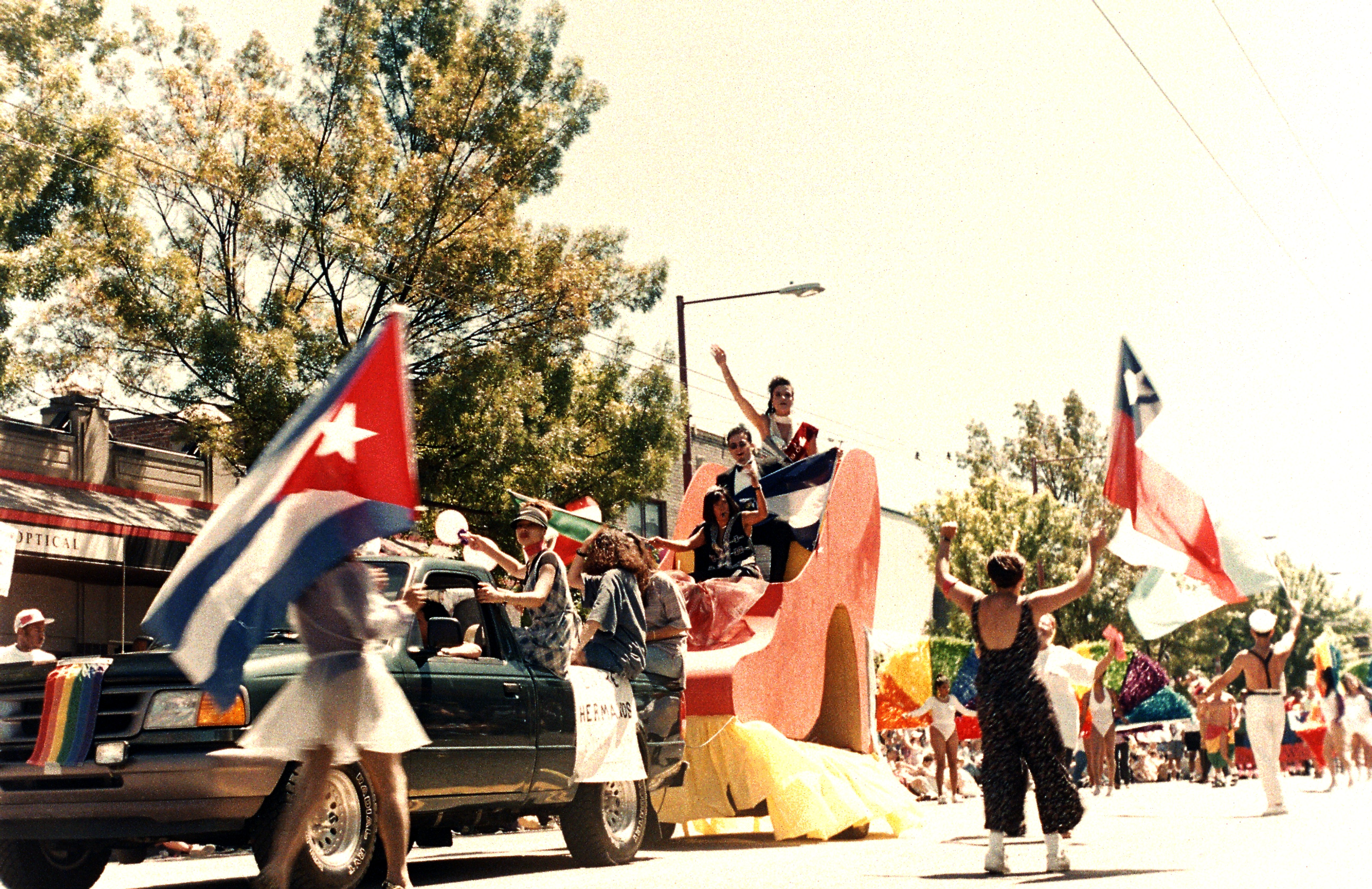
Seattle Pride 1995 - Latino contingent 01.

Francisco X. Alarcón's book Ya Vas, Carnal (1985) was the first published collection of gay Latino poetry. In the book, he advocates for the need to see homosexuality and poetry writing together. His poetry follows a "poetic rhythm and a penetrating, staccato to celebrate Latino identity", meaning that Alacrón's strict and flowing rhythm is broken by short breaks in the flow, following a free verse style. His work celebrates their identity while pushing back against homophobia and xenophobia.

Free verse, which does not require strict rules for the poem composition, is a common form of poetry for contemporary LGBTQ+ literature. More formal forms of composition are also utilized, such as the sonnets and the villanelle, where there are specific and fixed numbers of lines and syllables. These forms can also be used in conjunction with free verse, where the formal requirement becomes a shadow guide for the work is a trademark of Rafael Campo's work. Examples of the mixing of free verse and sonnet by Campo include: What the Body Told (1996), Landscape with Human Figure (1994), and The Other Man Was Me (1994).

=== Dramas and plays ===
Latino LGBTQ theatrical works comment on homosexuality, homophobia, identity, and community. Chicano theater scholar Jorge Huerta wrote in his book Chicano Drama: Performance, Society, and Myth discussing the theatrical works of Chicanos and includes a number of queer subject matters and performances. According to Huerta, the topic of sexuality was avoided in Latino dramas until the 1990s, and in the 1990s was still discouraged by many theater houses and was entirely taboo in many Chicano homes. According to scholar Yvonne Yarbro-Bejarano, playwrights were encouraged to challenge to the heteronormative scenes and for "the exploration of questions of sexuality."

A pioneering theatrical work in the representation of the Latino/Chicano LGBTQ experience was the 1972 play Day of the Swallows, by heterosexual playwright Estela Portillo-Trambley. The play follows two women in their forbidden and clandestine relationship as they search for security and an escape from repressive male ideals for women, and it ends with a tragic suicide. The play received both praise for its inclusion of queer characters and criticism for what Huerta refers to as "stereotypical or uninformed" heterosexuality, where the lesbian identity of the characters is only portrayed as a response to difficult situations with men. While characters and their journeys were confused and in ways, misinterpreted, Day of the Swallows paved the way of other playwrights to enter center stage. Playwrights such as Cherríe Moraga, Josephina López, Guillermo Reyes, Edgar Poma, Oliver Mayer, María Irene Fornés, Dolores Prida, and Janis Astor del Valle, lent their voices on stage to topics of immigration, biculturalism, and constantly shifting identities to give viewers an inside look on the cultural situation faced by many LGBTQ Latinos.

The scholarship of Jorge Huerta argues that to be considered queer literature, the plot and themes do not have to strictly revolve around the LGBTQ characters and situations but that their representation in Latino and Chicano theater demonstrates greater understanding of Latino subculture.

=== Novels ===
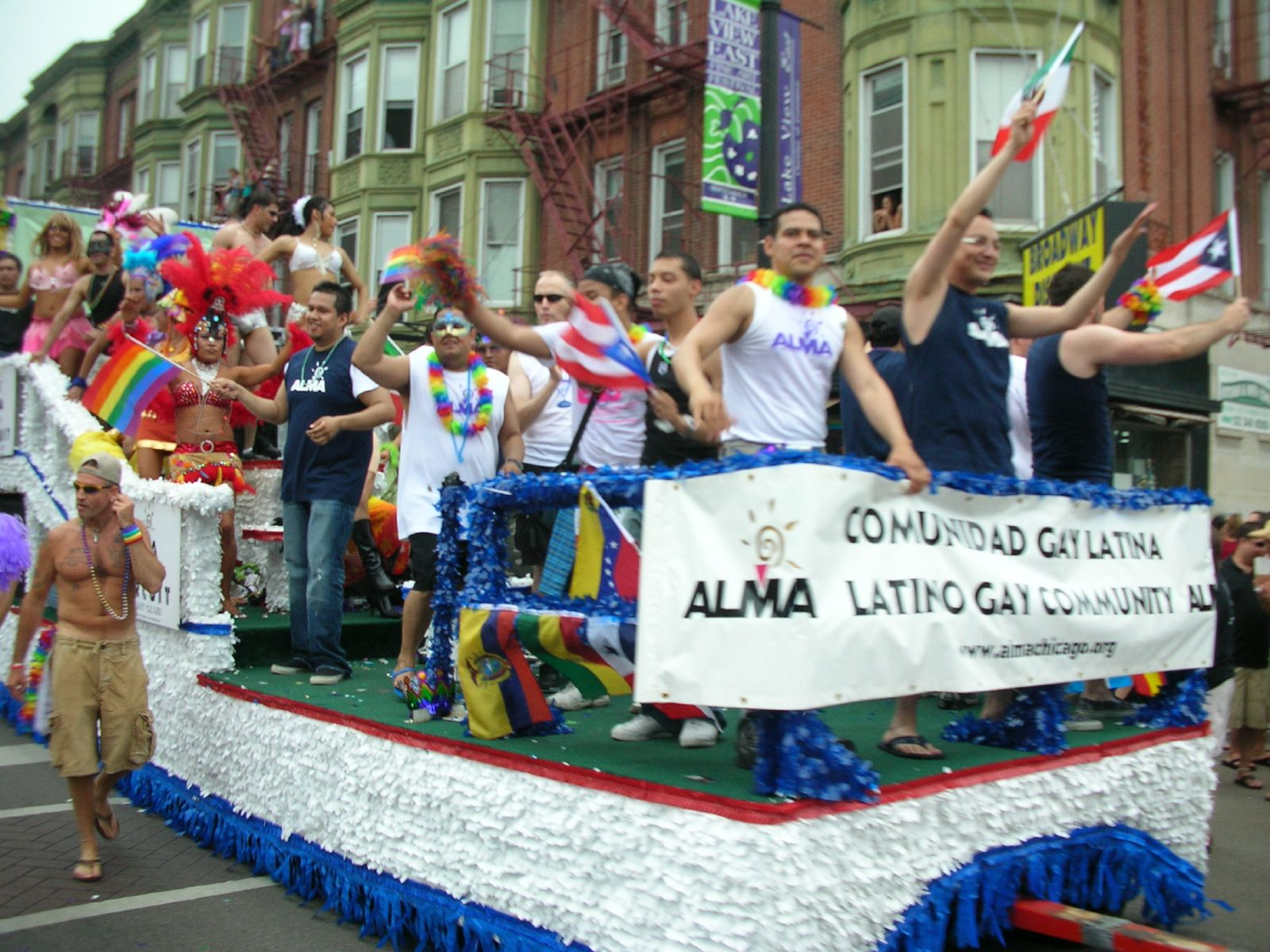
Gay Latino Float (623151097).

In 2013, Latino studies scholar Frederick Luis Aldama argued that novels have historically been more difficult for Latinos to publish compared to other written works, as publishing companies were hesitant to sign on Latinos or those that would not fit the presumed mold of bestselling authors. However, Latino authors did continue to write novels. Many Latina authors who wrote about lesbian or queer relationships turned to novel writing after establishing themselves in short stories, poetry, or dramas. Latinas began to use the novel in autobiographical ways and as historical fiction to demonstrate in-depth coming-of-age stories.

For example, author Emma Pérez Gulf Dream (1996) focuses on an unnamed protagonist as she discovers her place as a Chicana and her own sexuality while being confronted by violence against women and homosexuals in her community. Pérez also relies heavily on the theme of desire as it shapes the narrative. The themes present in Gulf Dreams are also represented similarly in Carla Trujillo's What Night Brings with her book following the experiences of young girl “unveiling her queer existence, where the girl is faced with the dangerous realities of homophobia."

The use of the novel for narrative fiction is also demonstrated in books such as Sor Juana's Second Dream by Alicia Gaspar de Alba, and many gay authors such as Lawrence La Fountian-Stokes, Arturo Islas, and Elías Miguel Muñoz. Specific to novels by gay authors, the narrative will comment on the Latino family, and rape (referred to in many Latino works as "sodomize"), while also offering a place for authors, like Islas, to reflect on personal experiences.
