= Ayao =

Yoruba goddess of the air and wind

- Orisha of the Air
- Weapon: Crossbow
- Artifacts: Quill and Nine stones
- Animals: Serpent
- Color: Brown and green

Genealogy
- Siblings: Oya

Ayao is an orisha in the Santería pantheon. She is the orisha of the air, and is considered to reside in both the forest and in the eye of the tornado. She works closely with Ọsanyìn and is a fierce warrior. Ayao has among her implements a crossbow with a serpent, a quill, and nine stones. She is commonly placed next to her sister, Oya. Her colors are brown and green. Ayao's cult was thought to be lost among various adherents; however, a growing number of olorichas have her in their possession.

== Rituals and practices ==
Her rituals often involve the use of feathers, gourds, and machetes, symbolizing her swift and protective nature. Devotees honor Ayao through offerings of fresh herbs, smoked fish, and white wine during ceremonies held in sacred groves or near ceiba trees. Drumming and songs dedicated to her call upon her energies to aid in transformation and to dispel negativity. She is also venerated in conjunction with other orishas like Oyá, often appearing in rituals to emphasize balance between chaos and protection.

== See also ==
- Aaja
- Ọya
