= Valeria Flores =

Argentine queer activist

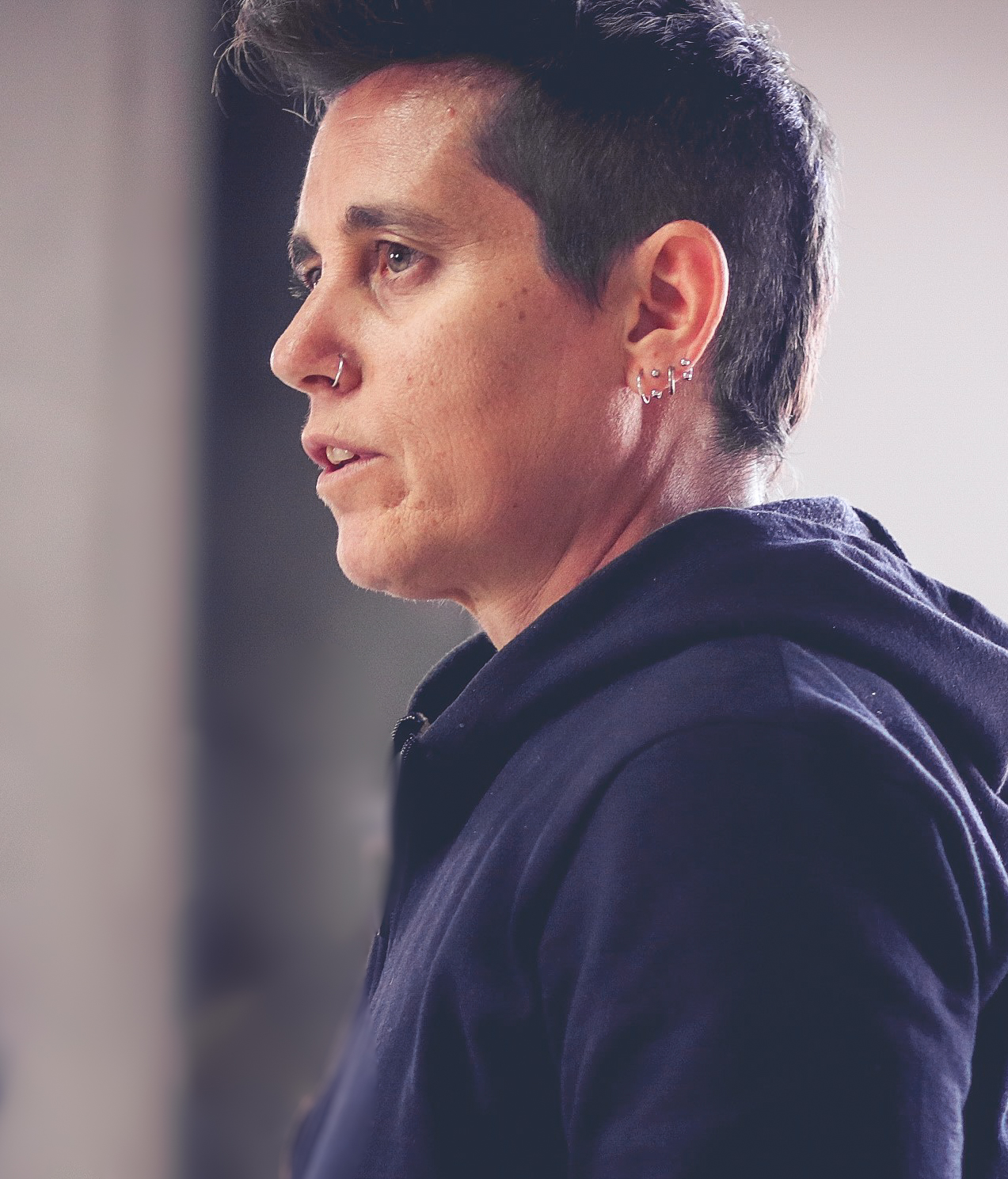
- Born: 12 January 1973 (age 52); Buenos Aires, Argentina

Valeria Flores (born 12 January 1973), also stylized as val flores, is an Argentine writer, teacher and lesbian queer activist. She is dedicated to queer theory and pro-sex feminism. She writes theoretical essays characterized by a poetic writing, and poetry. Among her published books are interruqciones. Ensayos de poética activista, Deslenguada. Desbordes de una proletaria del lenguaje and El sótano de San Telmo. Una barricada proletaria para el deseo lésbico en los 70. She also carries out performances and workshops as forms of political, aesthetic and pedagogical intervention.

== Biography ==
Born in Buenos Aires, at the age of three she moved to Neuquén with her family. There, she worked as a primary teacher in public schools in the city of Neuquén for 15 years. She is a Primary Education Teacher, and began several university careers that she "deserted", so her training as an intellectual and theoretical writer is rooted in a self-taught exercise. She lives in the city of Buenos Aires.

She was a co-founder of the feminist collective La Revuelta in 2001, and in 2004 she left the group due to personal and political differences. That year, she formed Fugitivas del Desierto – lesbianas feministas, a lesbian organization that carried out political, aesthetic, and theoretical interventions in Neuquén, Argentina (2004–2008). Together with the poet and lesbian activist, Macky Corbalán, between 2014 and 2015, she published the lesbian and feminist newsletter "La Sociedad de las Extranas", with a monthly circulation. The title is based on an excerpt from Virginia Woolf: "and we, who will remain strangers, will experiment", from the book Three Guineas.

In 2009 she created the personal blog "heretic writings" in which she publishes her theoretical, poetic and personal writings. In 2011, in Buenos Aires, she was part of the organization of the Critical Dialogues of Lesbian Activism. That same year she co-founded the digital archive of Argentine lesbian activism, Potencia Tortillera (2011–2015), which seeks to recover the memory of local lesbian existence and activism. In 2012, she participated as the organizer of the I Celebración de las Amantes. Jornadas de orgullo y disidencia lesbiana, in Córdoba.

In 2013, together with Macky Corbalán, she created the independent publishing house La Mondonga Dark, a project that sought to circulate unpublished and experimental voices in the field of literature. The publishing house ceased to exist when Macky Corbalán died in 2014.

In August 2013, together with Noe Gall and other lesbian activists, she created and disseminated A Proclamation of Pro-Sex Feminist Lesbians in Favor of Sex Workers, in response to the advance of abolitionist feminism and the criminalization of sex workers as a result of anti-trafficking laws. Currently, Flores is producing intellectual activist work.

In 2021, Flores published Romper el corazón del mundo. Modos fugitivos de hacer teoría.

== Theoretical production ==
The theoretical production of Flores is located at the crossroads between the activism of sexual dissidence, pedagogy and language. She reflects about her teaching experience at her pedagogical political and theoretical production, from a feminist and queer point of view. She elaborates a pedagogy that challenges the heterosexualization of teaching and seeks to dismantle heteronormativiy in the educational field. Among her reflections on language, she points out that working with words is thinking about how power is articulated from a micropolitical perspective, understanding language as a political territory.

Flores defines herself as lesbian, rejecting the category of "woman", following the theoretical production of Monique Wittig, who affirms that "lesbians are not women". For Flores, "lesbian" is a category from which to produce theory, not an identitarian category. In this sense, the author writes her name in lowercase as part of a political position.

She questions the hegemonic and normative discourses of the feminist movement in Argentina and Latin America, due to the way in which the hegemonic discourse of feminism in the region places women as a legitimate subject of feminism, leaving aside other identities. She also has a critical position around the binarism that predominates in the hegemonic feminist discourse and denounces that it reinforces the heteronormativity, silencing voices and experiences.

== Published books ==
=== Essays ===
- Notas lesbianas. Reflexiones desde la disidencia sexual. Editorial Hipólita. Rosario, 2005
- Chonguitas. Masculinidades de niñas, edited along with fabi tron. Editorial La Mondonga Dark. Neuquén, 2013
- interruqciones. Ensayos de poética activista. Escritura, política, pedagogía. Editorial La Mondonga Dark. Neuquén, 2013
- Deslenguada. Desbordes de una proletaria del lenguaje. Ediciones Ají de Pollo, Buenos Aires, 2010
- El sótano de San Telmo. Una barricada proletaria para el deseo lésbico en los ’70. Editorial Madreselva. Buenos Aires. 2015
- Las trastornadas entrelíneas o tres tristes trolas, en coautoría con Laura Gutiérrez. Milena Caserola. Buenos Aires. 2015
- Tropismos de la disidencia. Editorial Palinodia, Santiago de Chile. 2017
- Una lengua cosida de relámpagos. Colección incandescencias. Editorial hekht, Buenos Aires, 2019
- La intimidad del procedimiento. Escritura, lesbiana, sur como prácticas de sí. Serie Popova, de Píxel Editora, La Plata. Septiembre 2017
- Saber/coger como experiencia política. Desorganizar el cuerpo hétero. Serie Popova, de Píxel Editora, La Plata. Septiembre 2017
- Una poética feminista disidente. Éxtasis, perturbación e ironía. Serie Popova, de Píxel Editora, La Plata. Septiembre 2017
- El abismo como urgencia crítica. Editorial Mimesis, Santiago de Chile, 2019
- Romper el corazón del mundo. Modos fugitivos de hacer teoría. Continta me tienes Editorial, Madrid 2021

=== Poetry ===
- Bruma Coja. Editorial La Mondonga Dark. Neuquén. 2012
- Lenguaraz, along with Macky Corbalán. Editorial La Mondonga Dark. Neuquén. 2012
- Poéticas de lo blando, along with Macky Corbalán. Catálogo Marta Minujín. París- Nueva York- Neuquén. National Museum of Fine Arts, Neuquén. 2012–2013
- ¿dónde es aquí? Poetical essay. Editorial Bocavulvaria. Córdoba. 2015
- A veces sólo queda un contorno… Along with Fernanda Guaglianone. Homemade Ediciones # 11, de Corina Arrieta (La Plata), 2017
- Ella, no. 57 laconismos postapocalítpticos (o la masacre de una lesbiana eremita). Editorial exiliadas, La Plata, 2018
