= James Courage =

Novelist, short-story writer, poet, bookseller

- Born: 9 February 1903; Christchurch, New Zealand
- Died: 5 October 1963 (aged 60); London, England
- Resting place: Waipara River, New Zealand
- Occupation: Writer
- Writing career
- Genres: Novels, Short Stories, Plays

James Francis Courage (9 February 1903 – 5 October 1963) was a New Zealand novelist, short-story writer, poet and bookseller. He was born in Christchurch, Canterbury, New Zealand on 9 February 1903.

== Early life and education ==
Courage was born to Frank Hubert Courage and Zoë Frances Peache. He grew up near Amberley, New Zealand on a farm.

He attended Christ's College from 1916 to 1921. It was during his time there that he started writing. He later carried out his tertiary studies at St John's College, University of Oxford, in 1923.

== Career ==
In 1927, Courage relocated to London. He briefly worked as a journalist, served as a fire warden during World War II, and worked in a bookshop between 1940 and 1950. He was made the store manager in 1946.

Courage was a prominent writer. His rural New Zealand upbringing served as a setting for five of his eight novels. Some of his works were subject to censorship at the time of publication due to their depictions of romantic relationships between men. In particular, his novel A Way of Love (1959) was banned in New Zealand at the time due to its homosexual content.

Courage was a recipient of the Hubert Church Memorial Prize. He was also the inspiration for PEN's 'Courage Day' which raised awareness of the persecution of writers.

== Works ==
=== Novels ===
- One House (1933)
- The Fifth Child (1948)
- Desire without Content (1950)
- Fires in the Distance (1952)
- The Young Have Secrets (1954)
- The Call Home (1956)
- A Way of Love (1959)
- The Visit to Penmorten (1961)

=== Short stories ===
- Uncle Adam Shot a Stag (1945)
- A Smile on Sunday (1947)

=== Plays ===
- Private History (1938)

== Personal life ==
Much of Courage's life was documented in a series of diaries dated from 1920 to 1963. He wrote about his relationships as well as his experiences during the World War II bombings of London. In discussing his motivations, Courage told his diary: "Why do I go on writing? One reason is that I believe I’ve written about people in Canterbury as it has never been done before – just as Turgenev wrote about certain people in Russian provincial society as it had not been done before."

Courage lived in England for most of his life, though had a 17-month stint in New Zealand following a tuberculosis diagnosis and treatment in Norfolk from 1931 to 1933. He was also known to have depression, and received treatment at various points in his life.

Courage was gay, and recorded his relationships with various men in his diaries. He noted one particular relationship with a man named Frank, whom he briefly lived with in Argentina. He also maintained friendships with other prominent New Zealand writers such as Frank Sargeson and D'Arcy Cresswell.

Courage died in Hampstead on 5 October 1963. He requested to have his ashes scattered on the Waipara River in New Zealand, near where he grew up.
