= Hilma Contreras =

Hilma Contreras Castillo (December 8, 1913 – January 15, 2006) was a Dominican writer, born in San Francisco de Macorís.

She was educated in Paris, where she studied French and English, as well as literature and archaeology. She returned to the Dominican Republic in 1933. In 1937, at the encouragement of fellow writer Juan Bosch, she began writing stories, which were published in various newspapers.

In 2002, she became the first woman to receive the National Literature Award.

Contreras never married or had children, and died in her home town in 2006.

== Bibliography ==
- Doña Endrina de Catalayud (1952)
- Cuatro cuentos (1953)
- El ojo de Dios: cuentos de la clandestinidad (1962)
- La tierra está bramando (1986)
- Entre dos silencios (1987)
- Facetas de la vida (1993)
- Obras escogidas (to be published)
