= List of literary works relating to Tamil sexual minorities =

A large amount of literary works have been composed in the Tamil language since the dawn of the Sangam Era in 600 BCE – a time widely considered to be when Tamil diverged from Dravidian to form its own language group.

This article lists a variety of works relating to sexual minorities that have been conducted in the Tamil language, and/or by people of Tamil ethnicity, and/or about works that play an exceptional role for Tamil people.

== Tamil ==
=== Pre-Sangam ===
The folklore of Aravan

=== Sangam ===
The love story between King Pari and poet Kabila

Manimekalai

The bromance between Koperunchozhan and Pisuranthaiyar

=== Post-Colonial ===
The Last Pretense by Sarayu Srivatsa follows the story of Hindu boy Shiva and his adventure through sexual fluidity.

R. Thiagalingam's Tribu' *e. Thiagalingam's Tribu is a new addition to Tamil literature. This novel is about gender identity and its change It presents an inquiry into the quality and merits of the age-old values that Tamils have built and preserved.

Unarvum Uruvamum (Feelings of the Entire Body) by A. Revathi is a collection of real-life stories of the people belonging to the Hijra community. It was during this process that she decided to come out with her own autobiography because she felt that she would be able to bring out the problems of her community through her life story. That's how the book 'The truth about me' was both, which was translated later in several Indian languages.

Maraikappatta Pakkangal (Hidden Pages) by Gopi Shankar Madurai is the first book on Gender-Variants and LGBTQIA community in Tamil.

Antharakanni Poems by Leena Manimekalai A Tamil version of openly bisexual Afro American poet June Jordan's cult verse 'About my rights'.

Madhorubagan by Perumal Murugan follows the story of a woman who seeks help from a transgender god in order to give birth to a child, which raised protests from religious groups due to its promotion of sexual promiscuity.

Balachandran Endra Peyarum Ennaku by Puliyur Murugesan is about a transgender person forced into a marriage against their will.

Oruvar matroruvar, a short story by Ambai, explores the relationship between two men.

Kaadu, a novel by Jeyamohan, portraits homosexual relation during 1970s in rural India.

Gommorrah, a novel by Lakshmi Saravanakumar, follows Oedipus complex and Homosexuality

Naippoonaiyoor mazhaich chadangu, a short story by Ram Santhosh, explores bisexuality in the backdrop of fertility cult.

== English ==
Funny Boy (1994)

Cinnamon Gardens (1998)

Swimming in the Monsoon Sea

The Hungry Ghosts

Feelings of the Entire Body

The Death of Vivek Oji by Akwaeke Emezi (2020)

Puu (comic)
