= Anaisa Pye =

Spirit in Dominican Vudú

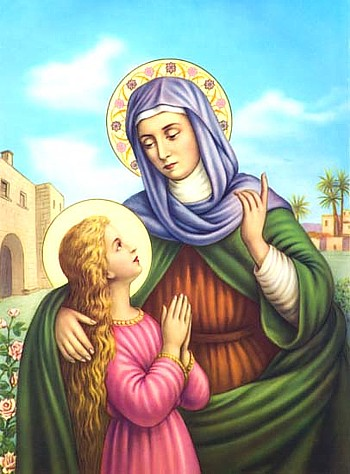
Saint Anne and the Virgin Mary as a child. For followers of Dominican Voodoo, this Christian saint is identified with Anaisa Pye.

Anaisa Pye (alternatively, Anaisa Pie, Anaisa Pie Danto, or Anaisa La Chiquita) is a popular loa within religion in the Dominican Republic. She is considered the patron of love, money, and general happiness within the religion in the Dominican Republic 21 Divisions.

She is often considered extremely flirtatious, generous, and playful by her devotees. She, as well as other worshipers, are concerned for other female loas, as they consider themselves able to provide for anything a person could request.

Among Dominican Roman Catholic believers, she is syncretized with Saint Anne. Her altars are often decorated with pictures and statues of Saint Anne and Mary as a child. She is said to work very well with Belie Belcan, another popular loa who is associated with Michael the Archangel. Icons of Saint Anne are generally placed next to icons of Saint Michael in Vodou households and temples.

Pye's favorite colors are yellow and pink. Some people consider Cachita to be one of her puntos (or incarnations).

== See also ==
- Ayao
