= Vigdís Grímsdóttir =

Icelandic writer (born 1953)

- Born: 15 August 1953 (age 73); Reykjavík, Iceland
- Education: University of Iceland (B.A.)
- Occupations: Writer and teacher
- Awards: Icelandic Literary Prize (1994)

Vigdís Grímsdóttir (born 15 August 1953) is an Icelandic writer.

== Early life and education ==
Born on 15 August 1953 in Reykjavík, she qualified as a teacher in 1973, then gained her Bachelor of Arts at the University of Iceland in 1978, and a further degree in 1982. She has taught in primary and high schools in Hafnarfjörður and Reykjavik, but since 1990 has concentrated almost exclusively on her writing.

== Career ==
She has written poetry, short stories, plays, and a children's book. One of her novels became the basis for a Swedish film. Her novel Kaldaljós was also the basis for two plays and an Icelandic film with the same title. Her books have been translated into many languages. Her 1989 novel Ég heiti Ísbjörg ég er ljón (My name is Ísbjörg, I am a Leo) was adapted for performance at the National Theatre of Iceland by Hávar Sigurjónsson in 1992.

== Works in translation ==
- 1990 "Vakna Törnrosa" í Sen dess har jag varit här hos er: 12 isländska noveller (Swedish)
- 1992 Nimeni on Ísbjörg, olen leijona (Finnish)

- 1993 Jeg hedder Ísbjörg, jeg er löve (Danish)
- 1995 Jag heter Ísbjörg, jag är ett lejon (Swedish)
- 1996 Je m'appele Ísbjörg, je suis lion (French)

- 1994 Flickan i skogen (Swedish)

- 1994 Metsän tyttö (Finnish)
- 1995 Pigen i skoven (Danish)

- 1995 Grandavägen 7 (Swedish)

- 1995 Kannastie 7 (Finnish)

- 1997 Älskades länder (Swedish)
- 1997 Z: rakkaustarina (Finnish)

- 1997 Z: A Love Story
- 1998 Z: en kärlekshistoria (Swedish)
