= Shirley Jülich =

New Zealand social work academic

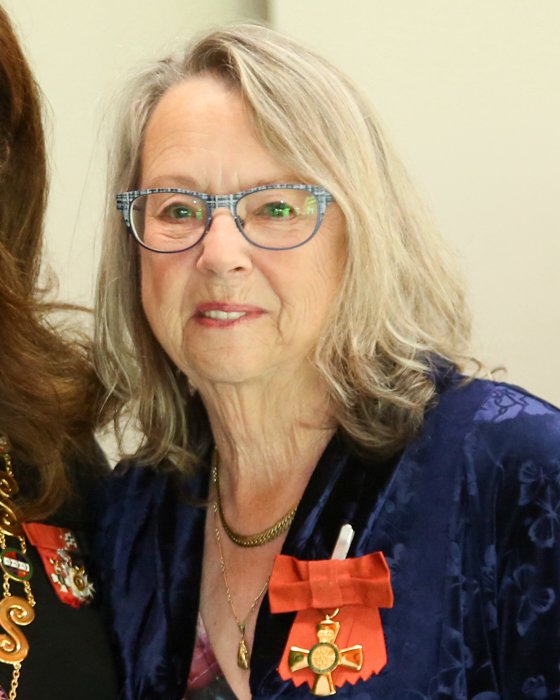
- Awards: Officer of the New Zealand Order of Merit

Academic background
- Education: Massey University
- Thesis: Breaking the silence: restorative justice and child sexual abuse (2001)
- Doctoral advisor: Marilyn Waring, Warwick Tie

Shirley Jean Jülich ONZM (born 1949) is a New Zealand social work academic, and is an associate professor at Massey University, specialising in restorative justice for sexual abuse. In 2023 Jülich was appointed an Officer of the New Zealand Order of Merit for services to restorative justice and survivors of sexual abuse.

== Early life and education ==
Jülich was born in 1949 and grew up in Grey Lynn. Her father was a police officer. She was educated at Auckland Girl's Grammar School. Jülich was sexually abused as a child, and when she and her brother revealed this to her father, as adults, he arranged a meeting where the abuser acknowledged what he had done. Her family took the case to court, and despite not receiving the outcome she would have liked from the case, Jülich says she found the process and bringing the abuse into the open empowering. Initially Jülich intended to study law at university, but went to Australia for her OE, where she worked as a community worker. She met her husband, a German engineer, and they travelled with their two children.

== Academic career ==
Jülich has been involved in restorative justice processes in New Zealand since the mid-1990s. She completed a Bachelor of Arts with Honours at Massey University in 1997, and then a PhD titled Breaking the silence: restorative justice and child sexual abuse also at Massey, supervised by Marilyn Waring and Warwick Tie, in 2001. Jülich then joined the faculty of the university in 2011, rising to associate professor. Her research is about how to use restorative approaches to achieve justice for survivors of abuse.

In 2005 Jülich and Kathryn McPhillips founded Project Restore, which is New Zealand's "national provider of restorative justice for harmful sexual behaviour and sexual violence".

== Honours and awards ==
In the 2023 King's Birthday and Coronation Honours Jülich was appointed an Officer of the New Zealand Order of Merit for services to restorative justice and survivors of sexual abuse.

== Selected works ==
- Jülich, Shirley Jean (2005). "Stockholm syndrome and child sexual abuse". Journal of Child Sexual Abuse. 14 (3): 107–129. doi:10.1300/j070v14n03_06. PMID 16203697. Wikidata Q36276413.
- Kim McGregor; Glover, Marewa; Jeny Gautam; Jülich, Shirley Jean (2010). "Working sensitively with child sexual abuse survivors: what female child sexual abuse survivors want from health professionals". Women & Health. 50 (8): 737–755. doi:10.1080/03630242.2010.530931. PMID 21170816. Wikidata Q43557284.
- Kim McGregor; Jülich, Shirley Jean; Glover, Marewa; Jeny Gautam (2010). "Health professionals' responses to disclosure of child sexual abuse history: female child sexual abuse survivors' experiences". Journal of Child Sexual Abuse. 19 (3): 239–254. doi:10.1080/10538711003789015. PMID 20509075. Wikidata Q47386219.
- Kim McGregor; Jeny Gautam; Glover, Marewa; Jülich, Shirley Jean (2013). "Health care and female survivors of childhood sexual abuse: health professionals' perspectives". Journal of Child Sexual Abuse. 22 (6): 761–775. doi:10.1080/10538712.2013.811143. PMID 23924181. Wikidata Q48191214.
