= Miriam Saphira =

New Zealand psychologist, poet, artist, author

Miriam Saphira CNZM
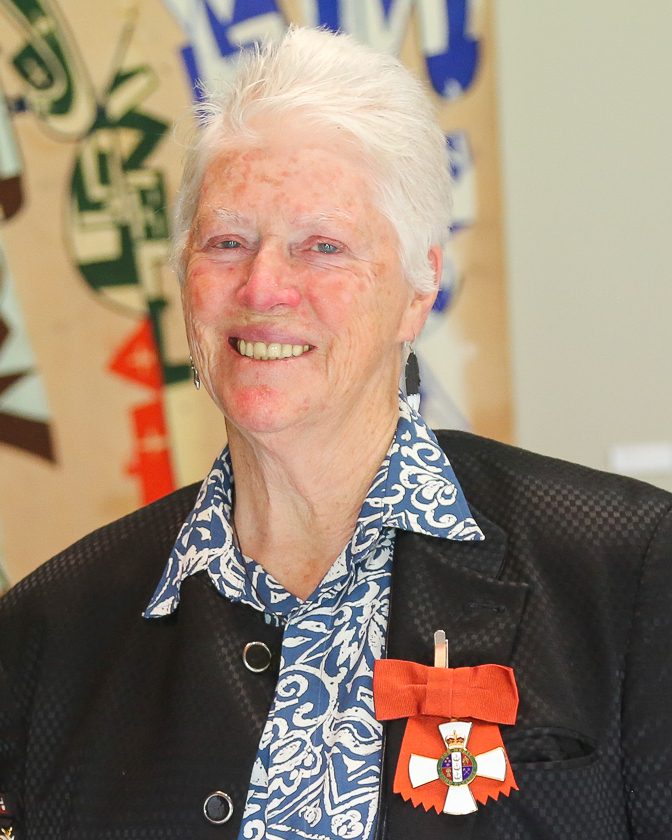
- Saphira in 2022
- Born: Mirian Edna Gibson; 24 July 1941 (age 85); Kaimiro, Taranaki, New Zealand
- Awards: New Zealand 1990 Commemoration Medal; New Zealand Suffrage Centennial Medal 1993

Academic background
- Education: University of Auckland
- Thesis: Children's understanding of sexual orientation (1990)
- Doctoral advisor: Jeff Field; John Gribben; Guy von Sturmer

Academic work
- Discipline: Psychology

Miriam Edna Saphira CNZM (née Gibson; born 24 July 1941) is a New Zealand lesbian activist, poet, artist and psychologist. Her 1981 publication, The Sexual Abuse of Children, was the first book on sexual abuse in New Zealand. Saphira founded New Zealand's only museum of lesbian culture, the Charlotte Museum, and in 2022 was appointed a Companion of the New Zealand Order of Merit, for services to the LGBTQIA+ community.

== Early life and education ==
Saphira was born Miriam Edna Gibson at Kaimiro, near Inglewood, on 24 July 1941, the daughter of Sheila Joan Gibson (née East) and Norman Parau Gibson. She was educated at New Plymouth Girls' High School and Kelston High School, and went on to train at Palmerston North Teachers' College. She later studied at the University of Auckland, earning a Bachelor of Arts degree in 1973, a Master of Arts in 1976, a Diploma in Clinical Psychology in 1977, a Diploma in Educational Psychology in 1984, and a PhD in 1991. Her doctoral thesis, titled Children's understanding of sexual orientation, was supervised by Jeff Field, John Gribben and Guy von Sturmer.

== Career ==
Trained as a psychologist, Saphira has researched and written about topics including incest, the sexual abuse of children, prostitution, rape, lesbian and gay rights, and violence against women. She worked with sex offenders, and supported incarcerated women. Her 1981 book, The Sexual abuse of children, was the first book on sexual abuse in New Zealand and became an important work for people working with either children and offenders.

Saphira was a member of the Broadsheet collective, a feminist magazine, from 1977 to 1984. She served as joint secretary general of the International Lesbian and Gay Association from 1986 to 1988, and was a founding trustee of the New Zealand AIDS Foundation (now the Burnett Foundation Aotearoa).

In 2007, Saphira founded the Charlotte Museum, New Zealand's only museum on lesbian culture. The need for the museum became apparent to Saphira when she tried to donate objects to the Lesbian and Gay Archives of New Zealand that they could not accept. The museum is named for two members of the KG Club committee, Charlotte Prime and Charlotte Smith, who died around the time of the museum's founding. In 2008, The Charlotte Museum Trust published a book edited by Saphira, about lesbian history. In April 2024, the museum held a pop-up exhibition dedicated to Saphira when she retired for health reasons from her positions as secretary of the board and museum trustee.

== Honours and awards ==
Saphira was awarded the New Zealand 1990 Commemoration Medal and the New Zealand Suffrage Centennial Medal 1993.

In the 2022 Queen's Birthday and Platinum Jubilee Honours, Saphira was appointed a Companion of the New Zealand Order of Merit, for services to the LGBTQIA+ community.

== Selected works ==
- Saphira, Miriam (1978). I ask of you. M. Jackson. OCLC 153846438.
- Saphira, Miriam (1992). Stopping child abuse: how do we bring up New Zealand children to be non-offenders?. Auckland: Penguin. ISBN 0140166971.
- Marno, Fran; Saphira, Miriam (1996). Beyond the straight and narrow: prints and paintings by Miriam Saphira. Auckland: Papers Inc.
- Saphira, Miriam (1997). A man's man: a daughter's story (1st ed.). Auckland: Papers Inc.
- Saphira, Miriam (1981). The sexual abuse of children. Auckland: Mental Health Foundation.
- Gibson, Miriam Edna; Glover, Marewa (2000). "New Zealand National Lesbian Health Survey". Journal of the Gay and Lesbian Medical Association. 4 (2): 49–56. doi:10.1023/a:1009565607435. Wikidata Q57830805.
- Gibson, Miriam Edna; Glover, Marewa (2001). "The Effects of Coming Out on Relationships and Health". Journal of Lesbian Studies. 5 (1–2): 183–194. doi:10.1300/j155v05n01_12. PMID 24807574. Wikidata Q57830801.
- Gibson, Miriam Edna (2001). "No Funds for Dirty Washing". Feminism & Psychology. 11 (3): 429–432. doi:10.1177/0959353501011003015. Wikidata Q130370351.
- Miriam Saphira, editor (2008). Remember us, women who love women, from sappho to liberation. Charlotte Museum Trust. ISBN 090870699
