= Timeline of LGBTQ history in New Zealand =

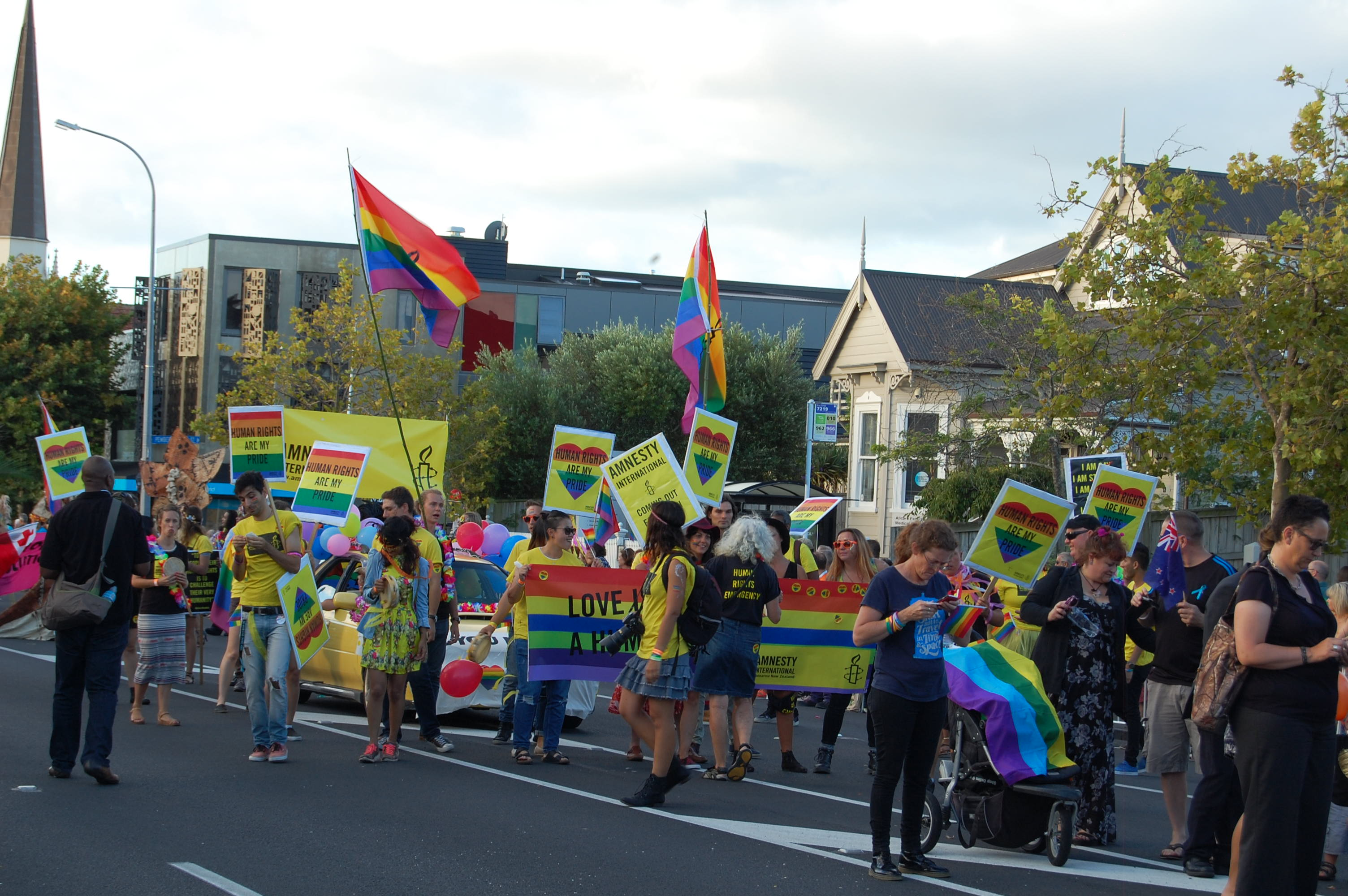
LGBT activists during the 2016 edition of Auckland Pride

This appendix shows a timeline of the most relevant events in the history of LGBT people in New Zealand.

== Before the 20th century ==
=== 1837 ===
- Missionary William Yate is expelled from the Church Mission Society following a scandalous investigation in which he is accused of having had sexual relations with several young Māori men.

=== 1840 ===
- 6 February: Representatives of Queen Victoria and Māori tribal chiefs sign the Treaty of Waitangi, by which New Zealand becomes part of the British Empire and adopts its laws, including the English law against sodomy. Consequently, sexual relations between men involving anal sex became criminalised in the country. The crime carried the death penalty as the maximum sentence.

=== 1867 ===
- The sodomy law is amended to remove the death penalty as a possible sentence, making the maximum penalty life imprisonment.

=== 1893 ===
- The sodomy law is amended to expand its scope and criminalise all sexual contact between men. Anal sex continued to carry the maximum penalty of life imprisonment, while other acts were usually punished with a sentence of one or two years.

== 20th century ==
=== 1909 ===
- 21 April: The famous con artist Amy Bock marries a wealthy woman in Dunedin after posing as a man to seize her wife's fortune. Bock was discovered days later and the marriage was annulled on 17 June of the same year.

=== 1920 ===
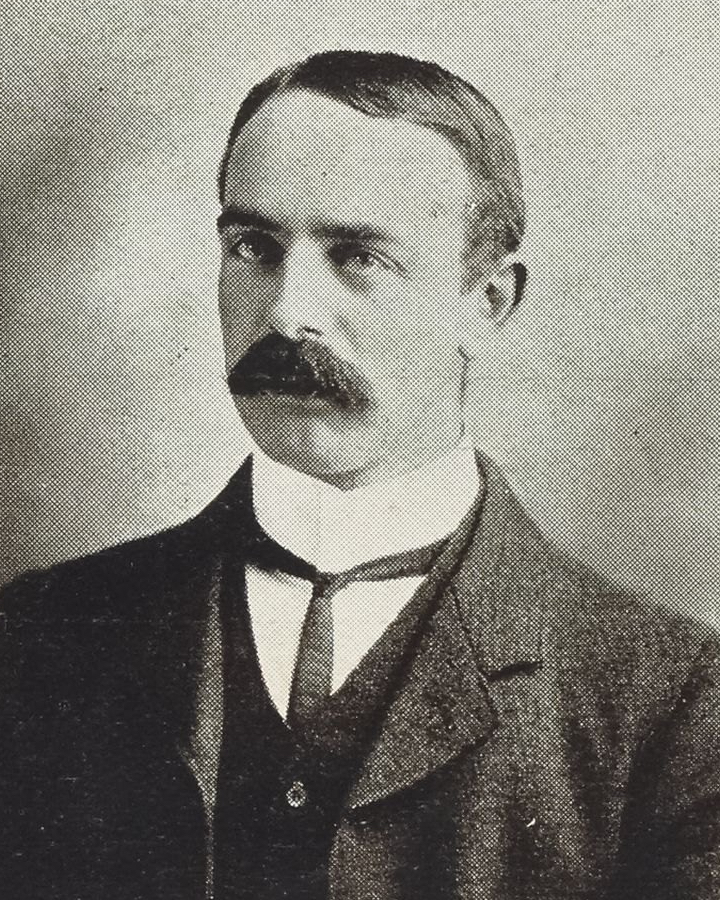
Charles Mackay in 1909

- 15 May: Charles Mackay, mayor of Whanganui, shoots poet D'Arcy Cresswell after the latter attempted to blackmail him under the threat of exposing his homosexuality. Cresswell survives and reports Mackay, who is found guilty and sentenced to fifteen years of hard labour.

=== 1938 ===
- New Zealand writer James Courage premieres his LGBT play Private History in London.

=== 1941 ===
- Floggings are abolished as a punishment for male homosexual acts.

=== 1957 ===
- The Ca d'Oro Coffee Lounge opens, a coffee lounge and bar that served as one of the first gathering places for LGBT people in Auckland.

=== 1959 ===
- James Courage publishes the novel A Way of Love, considered the first openly LGBT-themed novel in New Zealand history. Due to its subject matter, the work was banned in 1962.

=== 1961 ===
- The New Zealand Parliament removes life imprisonment as a possible penalty for sodomy.

=== 1962 ===
- The Dorian Society is founded in Wellington, a social club considered the first gay organisation in New Zealand history.

=== 1966 ===
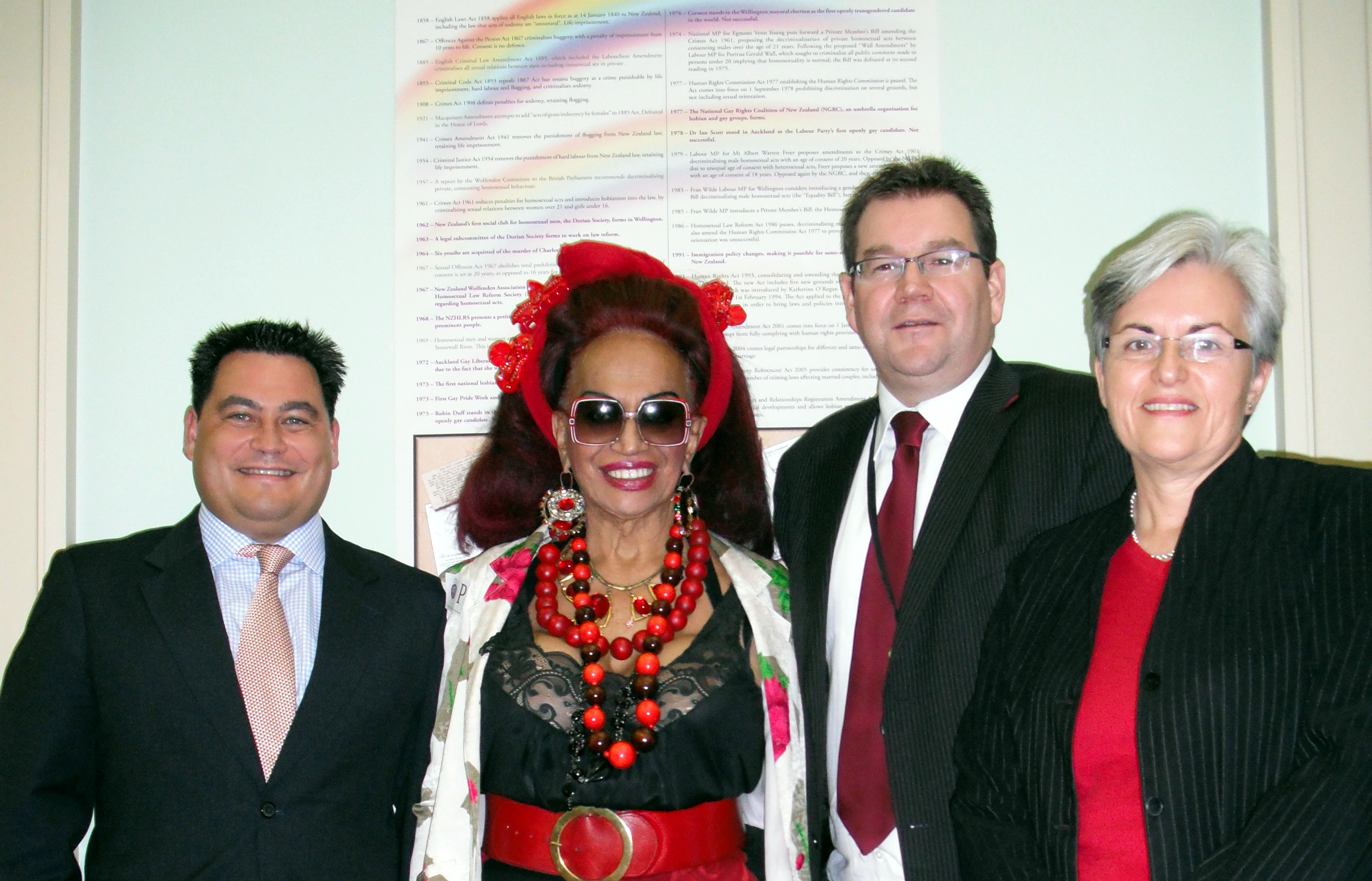
Carmen Rupe (centre) in 2009

- Transgender artist Carmen Rupe, regarded as New Zealand's first drag queen celebrity, wins a court case validating her right to wear women's clothing. The trial took place after Rupe was arrested for alleged "indecent behaviour" for wearing women's clothes.

=== 1967 ===
- 27 April: What was possibly the first television episode about the LGBT community in New Zealand is broadcast as part of the local investigative show Compass.

=== 1968 ===
- 8 October: The Dorian Society presents a petition to Parliament signed by 75 notable New Zealanders requesting the decriminalisation of homosexuality. However, Parliament rejected the petition.

=== 1972 ===
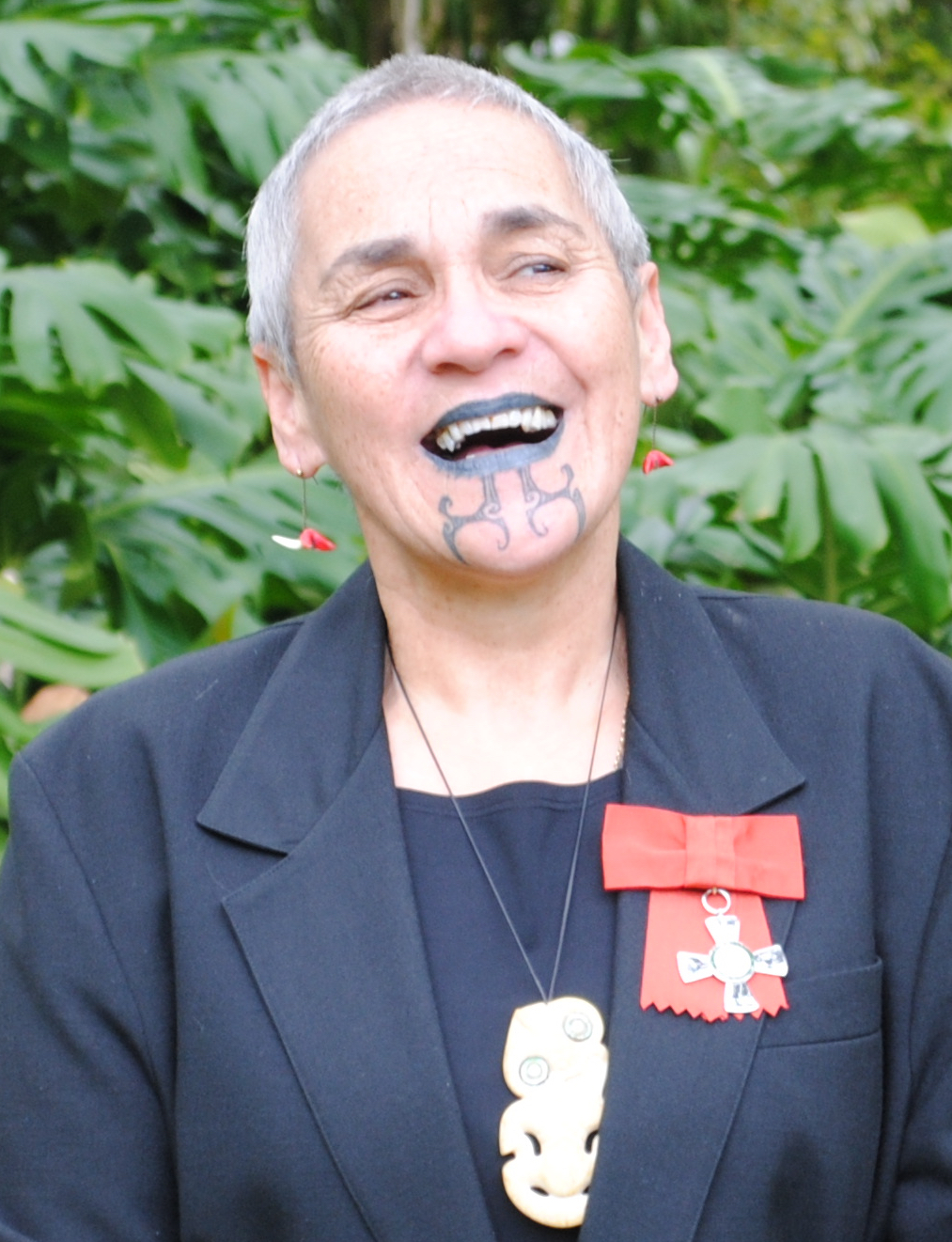
Ngahuia Te Awekotuku in 2010

- 15 March: Lesbian activist Ngahuia Te Awekotuku makes a public call during a University of Auckland student forum to begin a gay liberation process in the country. Six days later, Te Awekotuku and 40 students form the Gay Liberation Front of Auckland.
- 11 April: The first LGBT rights protest in New Zealand history takes place under the name "Gay Day". It was held at Albert Park in Auckland and organized by the Auckland Gay Liberation Front formed the previous month.

=== 1973 ===
- The organisation Sisters for Homophile Equality (SHE) is formed, considered the first New Zealand lesbian group.
- Sisters for Homophile Equality begins publishing Circle magazine, the country's first lesbian publication.

=== 1974 ===
- 2 March: Sisters for Homophile Equality organises the first national lesbian conference.

=== 1975 ===
- Activist and educator Robin Duff stands as a candidate for MP for Christchurch Central representing the Values Party, making him the country's first openly homosexual parliamentary candidate.

=== 1976 ===
- Politician Marilyn Waring, who had served as an MP for the New Zealand National Party since the previous year, is outed as a lesbian by the newspaper New Zealand Truth.

=== 1977 ===
- Robin Duff founds the National Gay Rights Coalition to bring together the more than 35 existing LGBT groups in the country.
- Transgender artist Carmen Rupe stands for mayor of Wellington in the October 1977 local elections, becoming the first transgender mayoral candidate in New Zealand.

=== 1980 ===
- The film Squeeze, directed by Richard Turner, premieres and is considered New Zealand's first LGBT feature film.

=== 1984 ===
- October: The Lesbian Community Radio Programme, focused on lesbian issues, begins broadcasting on Wellington Access Radio. The programme stayed on the air for 34 years until it changed its name to Quilted Bananas Radio Programme in 2018.
- The country's first death due to HIV/AIDS is recorded in the city of New Plymouth.

=== 1985 ===
- July: LGBT organisations launch a nationwide campaign to gather support for the decriminalisation of homosexuality.

=== 1986 ===
- 9 July: The New Zealand Parliament passes the Homosexual Law Reform Act 1986 with a 49 to 44 vote, decriminalising sexual relations between men in the country. The bill, originally introduced by MP Fran Wilde, received royal assent from the governor-general two days later and came into effect on 8 August of the same year. It only referred to relations between men, as sexual relations between women were never criminalised.
- The first edition of the Gay and Lesbian Fair is held in Wellington, considered the direct predecessor of the Wellington Pride Festival.

=== 1989 ===
- Writer Frances Cherry publishes the novel Dancing with Strings, considered New Zealand's first lesbian novel.

=== 1991 ===
- 5 October: The New Zealand AIDS Memorial Quilt is unveiled at Auckland Town Hall, honoring the victims of the HIV/AIDS pandemic.

=== 1992 ===
- February: The first edition of the Hero Parade is held in Auckland, continuing as an annual event until 2001.

=== 1993 ===
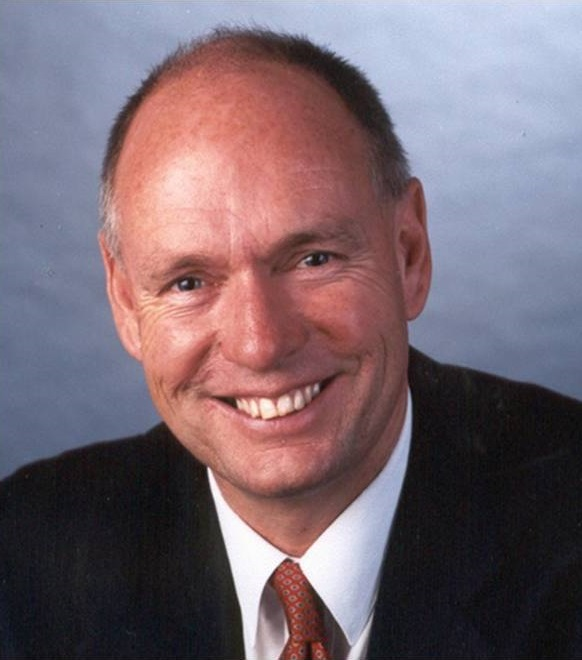
Chris Carter in 2008

- August: The New Zealand Parliament passes the Human Rights Act 1993, which prohibits discrimination based on sexual orientation. The act came into effect on 1 February 1994.
- 6 November: Politician Chris Carter is elected as an MP in the 1993 New Zealand general election. During his maiden speech in Parliament, he publicly comes out, becoming the first openly gay lawmaker in the country's history.

=== 1995 ===
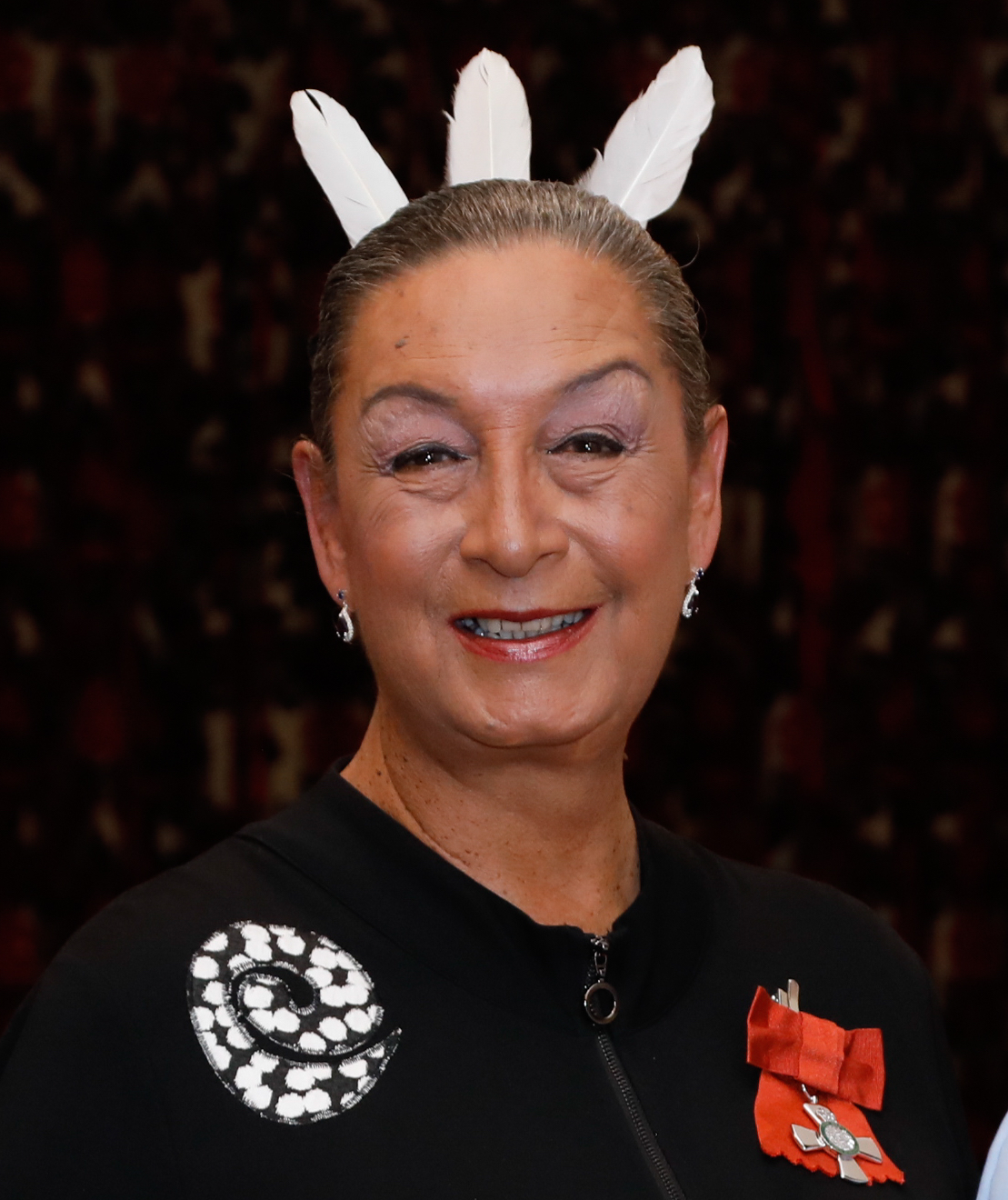
Georgina Beyer in 2020

- 11 May: The first edition of the LGBT film festival Out Takes opens in Wellington. In subsequent years, the festival expanded to Auckland, Christchurch, and Dunedin, running until 2014.
- 14 October: Politician Georgina Beyer is elected mayor of Carterton in the 1995 local elections, making her the world's first openly transgender mayor.

=== 1996 ===
- 5 February: The first edition of the LGBT television segment Express Report is broadcast, which soon became Queer Nation, the country's first LGBT television show, airing on Television New Zealand. Queer Nation continued broadcasting for ten years.
- 5 March: A new population census is conducted, counting same-sex partner households for the first time. The data showed that 0.7% of couples were same-sex.

=== 1997 ===
- Mani Bruce Mitchell establishes the Intersex Society of New Zealand. The previous year, Mitchell had become the first New Zealander to publicly identify as intersex.
- 17 December: The High Court of New Zealand rules against three lesbian couples who sought to marry and sued the attorney-general, arguing that there were no legal restrictions on same-sex marriage. In its ruling, the High Court rejected the claim.

=== 1998 ===
- The young adult lesbian novel Dare, Truth or Promise by author Paula Boock wins the Book of the Year award at the New Zealand Post Children's Book Awards, drawing criticism from the Christian Heritage Party.

=== 1999 ===
- 27 November: Georgina Beyer is elected as an MP in the 1999 New Zealand general election, making her the world's first openly transgender member of parliament.

== 21st century ==
=== 2002 ===
- 5 May: The Sentencing Act 2002 is enacted; section 9(1)(h) included as an aggravating factor that the crime was motivated by hostility towards the victim's sexual orientation or gender identity.
- 12 August: Chris Carter of the New Zealand Labour Party is appointed Minister of the Crown, making him the first openly gay male cabinet minister in the country.

=== 2003 ===
- 20 July: Interior designer and television personality David McNee is brutally murdered by a man who claimed McNee touched him after paying him for sex acts. The accused was found not guilty of murder after utilizing a gay panic defense, sparking anger in the LGBT community and subsequently leading to the abolition of this defence.

=== 2004 ===
- 9 December: The New Zealand Parliament legalises civil unions between same-sex couples with a 65 to 55 vote. The bill received royal assent from the governor-general on 13 December of the same year and came into effect on 26 April 2005.
- Māori Television premieres the show Takatāpui (based on the term Takatāpui), which became the world's first indigenous LGBT television programme.

=== 2005 ===
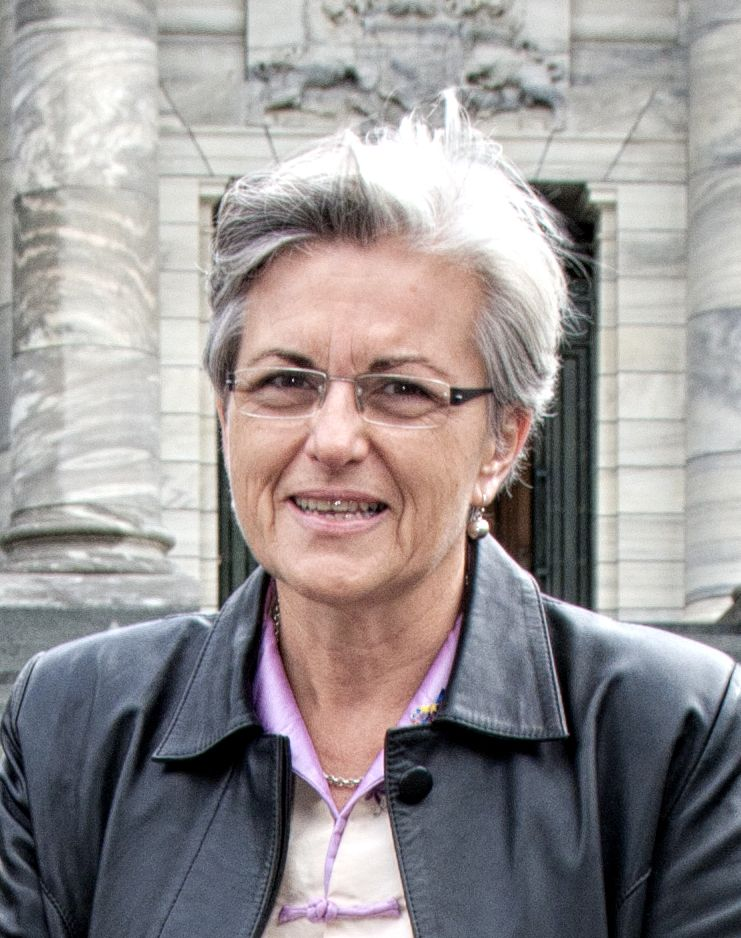
Maryan Street in 2012

- 15 March: The New Zealand Parliament passes the Relationships (Statutory References) Act, amending around 150 laws to include civil unions and de facto relationships in all references to marriage, thereby legally equating the three relationship types.
- 17 September: After securing a list seat in the 2005 New Zealand general election, Maryan Street becomes the first openly lesbian woman elected as an MP in New Zealand.

=== 2009 ===
- 25 November: The New Zealand Parliament passes a law with a 116 to 5 vote abolishing the defence of provocation, which had allowed some defendants to be acquitted of murder by claiming they were provoked, including through the gay panic defense.

=== 2013 ===
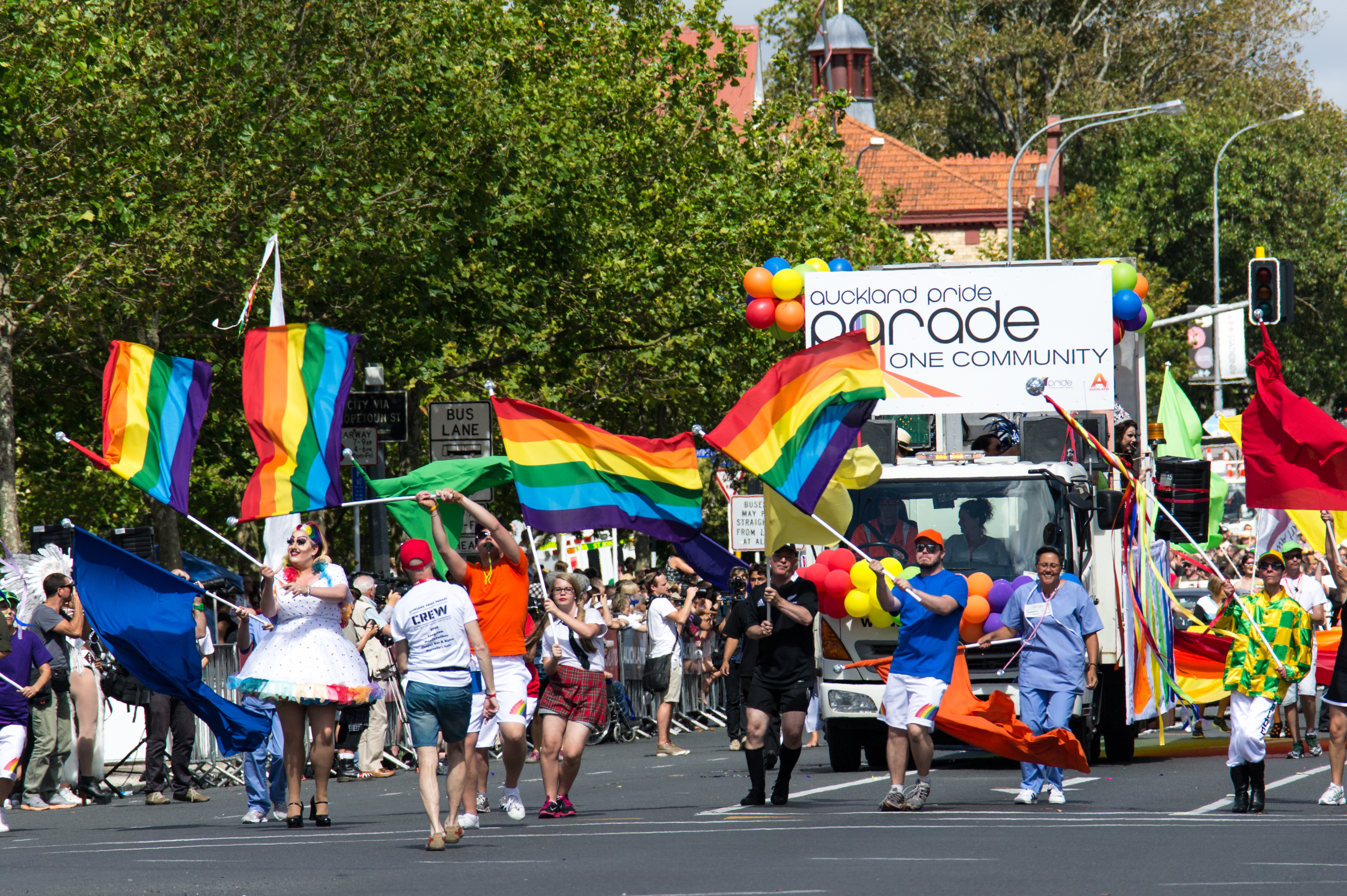
Participants of the 2013 Auckland Pride Parade

- 16 February: More than a decade after the end of the Hero Parade, whose final march took place in 2001, a new edition of the Auckland Pride Parade takes place.
- 19 April: The New Zealand Parliament legalises same-sex marriage with a 77 to 44 vote. The bill, introduced by MP Louisa Wall, received royal assent from the governor-general two days later and came into effect on 19 August of the same year.

=== 2014 ===
- 5 December: Matthew Muir becomes the first openly gay man appointed as a judge of the High Court of New Zealand.

=== 2015 ===
- December: The High Court of New Zealand issues a ruling that opens child adoption to LGBT couples in de facto relationships. Until then, only heterosexual de facto couples could adopt, while same-sex de facto couples had to marry before doing so.

=== 2016 ===
- 12 February: The first edition of the LGBT literary festival Samesame But Different opens in Auckland.

=== 2017 ===
- 18 March: The first Wellington Pride Parade through the city's main streets in nearly 25 years takes place.

=== 2018 ===
- 17 February: Jacinda Ardern becomes the first sitting New Zealand prime minister to march in an LGBT Pride Parade, attending the Auckland Pride Parade.
- 3 April: The New Zealand Parliament unanimously passes a bill allowing historical homosexual convictions, recorded before the 1986 decriminalisation, to be wiped from official records. The bill received royal assent on 8 April of the same year.
- 8 June: The country's first rainbow crossing is inaugurated in Queenstown.

=== 2020 ===
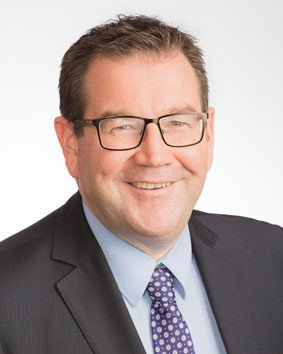
Grant Robertson in 2020

- 17 October: The 2020 New Zealand general election takes place, resulting in the election of 13 openly LGBT MPs. This represented 11% of parliament, breaking the world record for LGBT representation in a legislative body.
- 6 November: Grant Robertson is appointed deputy prime minister, making him the first openly LGBT person to hold the role in New Zealand history.

=== 2021 ===
- 9 December: The New Zealand Parliament unanimously passes a law allowing transgender people to update the gender marker on their birth certificates via self-identification, removing the requirement for medical evidence or a Family Court order.

=== 2022 ===
- 15 February: The New Zealand Parliament passes the Conversion Practices Prohibition Legislation Act 2022 with a 112 to 8 vote, banning conversion practices based on sexual orientation, gender identity, or gender expression. The law was enacted on 18 February of the same year.

=== 2023 ===
- 30 January: Rugby player Campbell Johnstone publicly comes out, making him the first openly gay man to have played for the All Blacks.

=== 2026 ===
- 4 May: The New Zealand Blood Service removes the blanket three-month deferral period for gay and bisexual men who have sex with men. Instead, the service implements an individual risk assessment framework that evaluates behaviours regardless of sexual orientation.

== See also ==
- LGBT rights in New Zealand
