= Censure in the United States =

Formal statement of disapproval towards a U.S. government figure

Censure is a formal, public, group condemnation of an individual, often a group member, whose actions run counter to the group's acceptable standards for individual behavior. In the United States, governmental censure is done when a body's members wish to publicly reprimand the president of the United States, a member of Congress, a judge or a cabinet member. It is a formal statement of disapproval.

The United States Constitution specifically grants impeachment and conviction powers, respectively, to the House of Representatives and Senate. It also grants both congressional bodies the power to expel their own members, though it does not mention censure. Each body adopts rules allowing censure, which is "stronger than a simple rebuke, but not as strong as expulsion." In general, each house of Congress is responsible for invoking censure against its own members; censure against other government officials is not common. Because censure is not specifically mentioned as the accepted form of reprimand, many censure actions against members of Congress may be listed officially as rebuke, condemnation, or denouncement.

Like a reprimand, a censure does not remove a member from their office so they retain their title, stature, and power to vote. There are also no legal consequences that come with a reprimand or censure. The main difference is that a reprimand is "considered a slap on the wrist and can be given in private and even in a letter," while a censure is "a form of public shaming in which the politician must stand before their peers to listen to the censure resolution."

== Definition ==
Censure is a way to show disapproval against the actions of a politician at all levels of government. It holds more of a symbolic meaning as it does not carry any tangible actions. Censures are most commonly found in the US Congress but can be used from local governments all the way up to censures against the president. Censure is not specifically mentioned in the US Constitution. however, the Supreme Court unanimously decided in 2022 that elected officials have the right to censure other politicians at their same level. Article I, Section 5 is where this power comes from as it allows houses to create a way of disciplining a member with a majority vote. With that being said, in Congress, a censure still has to be voted on and pass with a majority. There is little concern about censuring your peers but what is often debated if the ability to censure outside chamber, for example, Congress censuring the President. As there is not an action such as removal that comes from censure, it is accepted for a chamber of Congress to censure the president, although it is rare.

=== Adopted resolutions ===
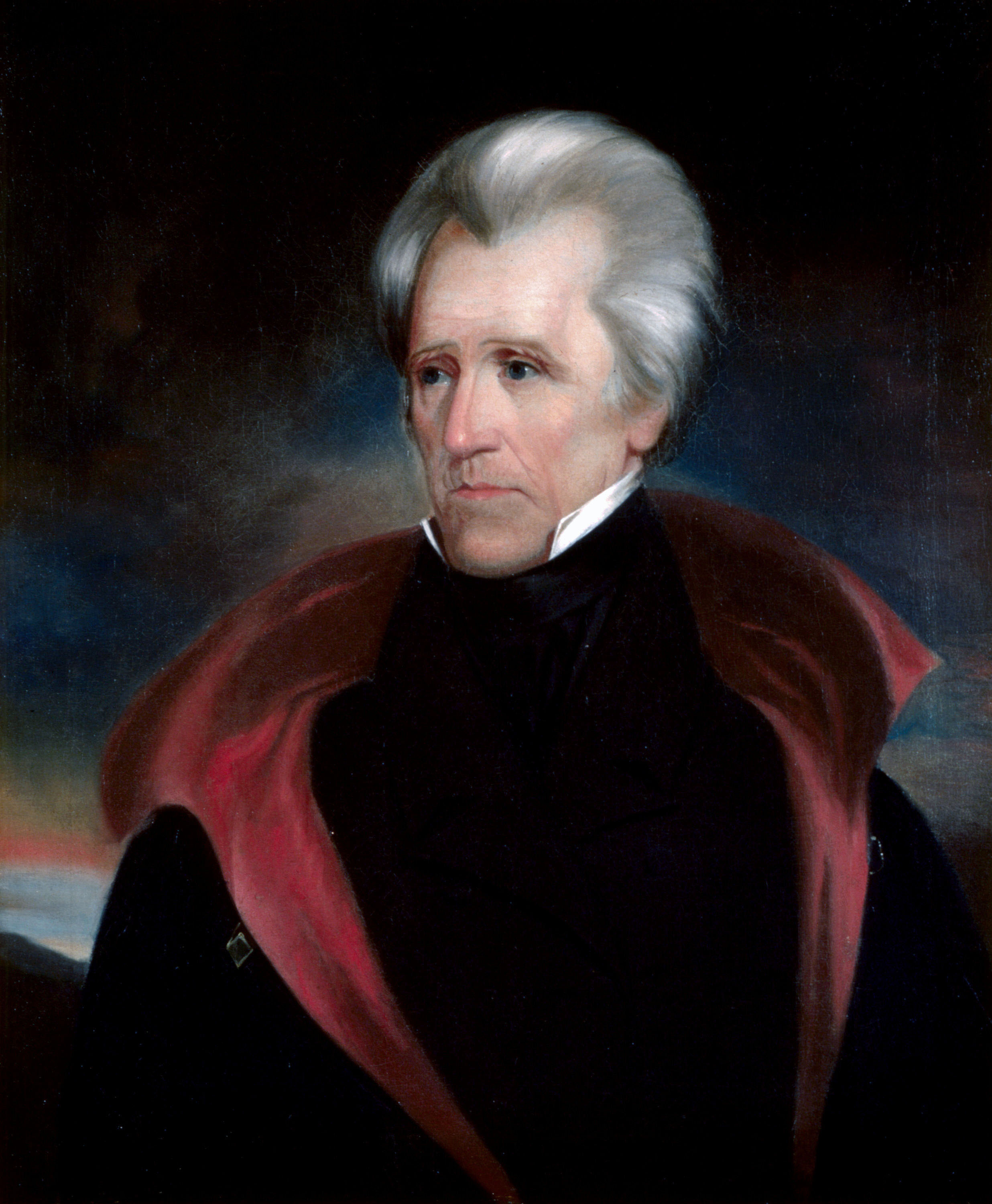
President Andrew Jackson was censured by the Senate in 1834. The censure was expunged in 1837.

There have been four cases in U.S. history where the House of Representatives or the Senate adopted a resolution that, in its original form, would censure the president.

The 1834 censure of President Andrew Jackson "remains the clearest case of presidential censure by resolution." In 1834, while under Whig control, the Senate censured Jackson, a member of the Democratic Party, for withholding documents relating to his actions in defunding the Bank of the United States. During the waning months of Jackson's term, his Democratic allies succeeded in expunging the censure.

In 1860, the House of Representatives adopted a resolution admonishing both President James Buchanan and Secretary of the Navy Isaac Toucey for allegedly awarding contracts on the basis of "party relations." The House may have intended this resolution as a lesser reprimand than a formal censure.

In two other cases, the Senate adopted a resolution that was originally introduced to censure the president, but that, in its final form, did not overtly censure the president.

In 1864, during the American Civil War, Senator Garrett Davis introduced a resolution to censure President Abraham Lincoln for allowing two individuals to resume their service as generals after winning election to Congress. The final resolution adopted by the Senate required generals to be "re-appointed in the manner provided by the Constitution," but did not overtly censure Lincoln.

In 1912, Senator Joseph Weldon Bailey introduced a resolution censuring President William Howard Taft for allegedly interfering with a disputed Senate election. The final Senate resolution did not specifically refer to Taft, but stated that presidential interference in a disputed Senate race would warrant censure.

=== Other censure attempts ===
Several other presidents have been subject to censure attempts in which no formal resolution was adopted by either the House or the Senate. In 1800, Representative Edward Livingston of New York introduced a censure motion against President John Adams. In 1842, Whigs attempted to impeach President John Tyler following a long period of hostility with the president. When that action could not get through Congress, a select Senate committee dominated by Whigs censured Tyler instead. In 1848, Congressman George Ashmun led an effort to censure President James K. Polk, on the grounds that the Mexican–American War had been "unnecessarily and unconstitutionally begun by the President." The House of Representatives voted to add Ashmun's censure as an amendment to a resolution under consideration by the House, but the resolution itself was never adopted by the House. In 1871, Senator Charles Sumner introduced an unsuccessful resolution to censure President Ulysses S. Grant for deploying ships to the Dominican Republic without the approval of Congress. In 1952, Congressman Burr Powell Harrison introduced a resolution censuring President Harry S. Truman for seizing control of steel mills during the 1952 steel strike. The resolution ultimately did not receive a vote.

President Richard M. Nixon was the subject of several censure resolutions introduced in the House of Representatives; most of the resolutions were related to the Watergate scandal. In 1972, a resolution censuring Nixon for his handling of the Vietnam War was introduced. A separate series of censure resolutions were introduced after the "Saturday Night Massacre" in October 1973. Another series of resolutions were introduced in July 1974. None of the resolutions were adopted, but Nixon resigned from office in August 1974.

In 1998, resolutions to censure President Bill Clinton for his role in the Clinton–Lewinsky scandal were introduced and failed. The activist group MoveOn.org originated in 1998, after the group's founders began a petition urging the Republican-controlled Congress to "censure President Clinton and move on"—i.e., to drop impeachment proceedings, pass a censure of Clinton, and focus on other matters. From 2005 to 2007, members of Congress introduced several resolutions to censure President George W. Bush and other members of the Bush administration. Most of the resolutions focused on Bush's handling of the Iraq War, but one resolution concerned the administration's "unlawful authorization of wiretaps of Americans" and two others alleged that Bush and Attorney General Alberto Gonzales had violated "statutes, treaties, and the Constitution." From 2013 to 2016, members of Congress introduced several resolutions to censure President Barack Obama. These resolutions charged that Obama had usurped the "legislative power of Congress" or had acted unlawfully. None of the resolutions to censure Bush or Obama were adopted.

On August 18, 2017, a resolution was introduced in the House to censure President Donald Trump for his comments "that 'both sides' were to blame for the violence in" the Unite the Right rally. On January 18, 2018, another motion to censure Trump was introduced in the House of Representatives by Rep. Cedric Richmond (D), who at the time was the Chairman of the Congressional Black Caucus, for Trump's remark, alleged by people in the room, stating "Why do we want all these people from 'shithole countries' coming here?" According to people in the room at the time, Trump was referring to people from Haiti and African nations coming to the United States. The censure motion failed to reach any legislative action. This comment was alleged to have been made on January 11, 2018, in an Oval Office meeting with lawmakers regarding immigration.

== Senatorial censures ==
Senator Joseph McCarthy, one of ten U.S. senators to be censured

The U.S. Senate has developed procedures for taking disciplinary action against senators through such measures as formal censure or actual expulsion from the Senate. The Senate has two basic forms of punishment available to it: expulsion, which requires a two-thirds vote; or censure, which requires a majority vote. Censure is a formal statement of disapproval. While censure (sometimes referred to as condemnation or denouncement) is less severe than expulsion in that it does not remove a senator from office, it is nevertheless a formal statement of disapproval that can have a powerful psychological effect on a member and on that member's relationships in the Senate.

In the history of the Senate, 10 U.S. Senators have been censured, the most famous being Joseph McCarthy. Their transgressions have ranged from breach of confidentiality to fighting in the Senate chamber and more generally for "conduct that tends to bring the Senate into dishonor and disrepute".

== House censures ==
The House of Representatives is authorized to censure its own members by the scope of United States Constitution (Article I, Section 5, clause 2). In the House of Representatives, censure is essentially a form of public humiliation carried out on the House floor. As the Speaker of the House reads out a resolution rebuking a member for a specified misconduct, that member must stand in the House well and listen to it. This process has been described as a morality play in miniature.

Most cases arose during the 19th century. Censure has been successful 26 times. In the modern history of the United States House Committee on Standards of Official Conduct (since 1966), censure has been successful nine times.

== Cabinet censures ==
- The first attempted use of censure in the United States was directed at George Washington's treasury secretary Alexander Hamilton, who was accused of misadministration of two congressionally authorized loans under the Funding Act of 1790 by William Giles.
- Augustus Hill Garland, Attorney General in Grover Cleveland's administration, was censured in 1886 for failing to provide documents about the firing of a federal prosecutor.

== Censure at other levels of government ==
In Houston Community College System v. Wilson (2022) the Supreme Court of the United States held that the First Amendment to the United States Constitution does not prevent local government bodies from censuring their own members.

== Chronology of censures ==
To date, Andrew Jackson is the only sitting president of the United States to be successfully censured, although his censure was subsequently expunged from official records. Between 2017 and 2020, several members of Congress introduced motions to censure President Donald Trump for various controversies, including as a possible substitute for impeachment during the Trump-Ukraine scandal, but none were successful.

On December 2, 1954, Republican Senator Joseph McCarthy from Wisconsin was censured by the United States Senate for failing to cooperate with the subcommittee that was investigating him, and for insulting the committee that was recommending his censure.

On June 10, 1980, Democratic Representative Charles H. Wilson from California was censured by the House of Representatives for "financial misconduct", as a result of the "Koreagate" scandal of 1976. "Koreagate" was an American political scandal involving South Koreans seeking influence with members of Congress. An immediate goal seems to have been reversing President Richard Nixon's decision to withdraw troops from South Korea. It involved the Korean CIA funneling bribes and favors through Korean businessman Tongsun Park in an attempt to gain favor and influence. Some 115 members of Congress were implicated.

On July 20, 1983, Representatives Dan Crane, a Republican from Illinois, and Gerry Studds, a Democrat from Massachusetts, were censured by the House of Representatives for their involvement in the 1983 congressional page sex scandal.

On July 12, 1999, the U.S. House of Representatives censured (in a 355-to-0 vote) a scientific publication titled "A Meta-analytic Examination of Assumed Properties of Child Sexual Abuse Using College Samples", by Bruce Rind, Philip Tromovich, and Robert Bauserman; (see Rind et al. controversy) which was published in the American Psychological Association's "Psychological Bulletin (July 1998).

On July 31, 2007, retired Army General Philip Kensinger was censured by the United States Army for misleading investigators of the Pat Tillman death in 2004.

On July 6, 2009, South Carolina Republican Governor Mark Sanford was censured by the South Carolina Republican Party executive committee for traveling overseas on taxpayer funds to visit his mistress.

On October 13, 2009, the mayor of Sheboygan, Wisconsin, Bob Ryan, was censured due to a YouTube video that showed him making sexually vulgar comments about his sister-in-law taken at a bar on a cell phone. The censure was voted 15-0 by the Sheboygan Common Council. His powers were also quickly reduced by the Common Council, and he was ultimately removed from office two and a half years later in a recall election for continued improprieties in office.

In November 2009, members of the Charleston County Republican Party censured Republican Senator Lindsey Graham of South Carolina in response to his voting to bail out banks and other Wall Street firms, and for his views on immigration reform and cap-and-trade climate change legislation.

On December 2, 2010, Democratic Rep. Charlie Rangel from the State of New York was censured after an ethics panel found he violated House rules, specifically failing to pay taxes on a villa in the Dominican Republic, improperly soliciting charitable donations, and running a campaign office out of a rent-stabilized apartment meant for residential use.

On January 4, 2010, members of the Lexington County Republican Party censured Senator Lindsey Graham of South Carolina for his support of government intervention in the private financial sector and for "debasing" longstanding Republican beliefs in economic competition.

On January 22, 2013, the Arizona Republican Party censured longtime Sen. John McCain for his record of occasionally voting with Democrats on some issues.

On February 6, 2021, the Wyoming Republican Party censured Rep. Liz Cheney, the House Republican Conference Chair and third highest-ranking member of the House Republican leadership, for her vote to impeach former President Donald Trump during his second impeachment.

On February 13, 2021, the Louisiana Republican Party censured Senator Bill Cassidy, the senior U.S. senator from Louisiana, for his vote to convict former President Donald Trump during his second impeachment trial.

On February 15, 2021, the North Carolina Republican Party's central committee voted to censure U.S. Senator Richard Burr for his vote to convict former president Donald Trump during his second impeachment trial.

On March 16, 2021, the Alaska Republican Party censured U.S. Senator Lisa Murkowski for her vote to convict former president Donald Trump during his second impeachment trial.

On November 17, 2021, the Democratic-controlled U.S. House of Representatives passed a measure to censure Republican Rep. Paul Gosar for posting an anime video of him killing fellow Representative Alexandria Ocasio-Cortez and attacking President Joe Biden.

On January 22, 2022, the Arizona Democratic Party censured U.S. Senator Kyrsten Sinema for blocking voting rights.

On February 4, 2022, the Republican National Committee voted to formally censure Rep. Liz Cheney and Rep. Adam Kinzinger for their participation in the United States House Select Committee on the January 6 Attack.

On June 21, 2023, the Republican-controlled U.S. House of Representatives passed a measure to censure Democratic Rep. Adam B. Schiff for pressing allegations that Donald Trump's 2016 presidential campaign colluded with Russia, a week after a first attempt to censure Schiff was blocked.

On November 7, 2023, in a 234–188 vote the U.S. House of Representatives censured Rep. Rashida Tlaib (D-Mich.) for her remarks related to the Gaza war. This marked the second attempt to censure Tlaib, who was accused of "promoting false narratives" and "calling for the destruction of the state of Israel". Tlaib had shared a video on social media that used the phrase "from the river to the sea". The censure was supported by 22 Democrats and drew attention as a symbolic move, given Tlaib's status as the only Palestinian American in Congress. Despite criticism from members of both parties, most Democrats opposed the censure, emphasizing freedom of speech.

On December 8, 2023, the U.S. House of Representatives voted to censure Rep. Jamaal Bowman (D-NY) in a 214-191 vote for pulling a fire alarm to stall a House vote on September 26, 2023. He was seen on video attempting to open a door, and then pulling the fire alarm. He claimed he thought that the alarm would open the door. On October 30, Rep. Bowman pled guilty to a misdemeanor count and was fined $1000.

On March 6, 2025, the U.S. House of Representatives voted to censure Rep. Alexander N. Green (D-TX) in a 224–198–2 vote, with 10 Democrats joining most Republican in voting in favor of the censure. The vote was held after Green disrupted President Donald Trump's March 4, 2025, address to a joint session of Congress by pointing his cane at the dais and shouting, "You have no mandate to cut Medicaid." Green was escorted out of the House Chamber by the sergeant-at-arms after repeatedly interrupting the address.

On May 20, 2026, the Colorado Democratic Party censured Governor Jared Polis for commuting the sentence of Tina Peters, the former county clerk of Mesa County, Colorado, who was convicted in state court in 2024 on multiple felonies for her involvement in attempts to overturn the 2020 United States presidential election.
