= Rind et al. controversy =

Scientific controversy regarding child sexual abuse

The Rind et al. controversy was a debate in the scientific literature, public media, and government legislatures in the United States regarding a 1998 peer-reviewed meta-analysis of the self-reported harm caused by child sexual abuse (CSA). The debate resulted in the unprecedented condemnation of the paper by both chambers of the United States Congress. Some in the social science research community were concerned that the condemnation by government legislatures might have a chilling effect on the future publication of controversial research results.

The study's lead author was psychologist Bruce Rind; it expanded on a 1997 meta-analysis for which Rind was also the lead author. The authors stated their goal was to determine whether CSA caused pervasive, significant psychological harm for both males and females, controversially concluding that the harm caused by child sexual abuse was not necessarily intense or pervasive, that the prevailing construct of CSA was not scientifically valid, as it failed empirical verification, and that the psychological damage caused by the abusive encounters depends on other factors, such as the degree of coercion or force involved. The authors concluded that even though CSA may not result in lifelong, significant harm to all victims, this does not mean it is not morally wrong and indicated that their findings did not imply current moral and legal prohibitions against CSA should be changed.

The Rind et al. study has been criticized by many scientists and researchers, on the grounds that its methodology and conclusions were poorly designed and statistically flawed. Its definition of harm, for example, has been the subject of debate, as it only examined self-reported long-term psychological effects in young adults, whereas harm can have several forms, including short-term or medical harm (for example, sexually transmitted infections or injuries), a likelihood of revictimization, and the amount of time the victim spent attending therapy for the abuse. Numerous studies and professional clinical experience in the field of psychology, both before and after Rind et al.'s publications, have long borne out that children cannot consent to sexual activity and that child and adolescent sexual abuse cause harm. Psychologist Anna Salter commented that Rind et al.'s results are "truly an outlier" compared to other meta-analyses.

A later CSA study by Heather Ulrich and two colleagues, published in The Scientific Review of Mental Health Practice, attempted to replicate the Rind study, correcting for methodological and statistical problems identified by Dallam and others, and it ultimately supported some of the Rind findings but also acknowledged the limitations of the findings, and, ultimately did not endorse Rind's recommendation to abandon the use of the term child sexual abuse in cases of apparent consent in favor of the term adult-child sex.

The Rind paper has been quoted by people and organizations advocating age-of-consent reform, pedophile or pederasty groups, in support of their efforts to change attitudes towards pedophilia and to decriminalize sexual activity between adults and minors (children or adolescents).

== Studies and findings ==
In 1997, psychology professor Bruce Rind of Temple University and doctoral student Philip Tromovitch of the University of Pennsylvania published "A meta-analytic review of findings from national samples on psychological correlates of child sexual abuse", a literature review of seven studies regarding adjustment problems of victims of child sexual abuse (CSA). To avoid the sampling bias that, they argued, existed in most studies of CSA (which drew from samples mostly in the mental health or legal systems and thus were, they claimed, not representative of the population as a whole), the 1997 study combined data from studies using only national samples of individuals expected to be more representative of the population of child sexual abuse victims. This study examined 10 independent samples designed to be nationally representative, based on data from more than 8,500 participants. Four of the studies came from the United States, and one each came from Great Britain, Canada, and Spain.

Based on the results, they concluded that the general consensus associating CSA with intense, pervasive harm and long-term maladjustment was incorrect. In 1998, Rind, Tromovitch and Robert Bauserman (then a professor at the University of Michigan) published "A Meta-Analytic Examination of Assumed Properties of Child Sexual Abuse Using College Samples", a meta-analysis in the Psychological Bulletin of 59 studies (36 published studies, 21 unpublished doctoral dissertations, and 2 unpublished master's theses) with an aggregate sample size of 35,703 college students (13,704 men and 21,999 women).

In most of the 59 studies, CSA was defined by the authors based on legal and "moral" criteria— integrating the sometimes disparate and conflicting definitions, CSA was defined as "a sexual interaction involving either physical contact or no contact (e.g., exhibitionism) between either a child or adolescent and someone significantly older, or between two peers who are children or adolescents when coercion is used." "Child" was sometimes defined, not biologically, but as underaged or as a minor under the legal age of consent. All these studies were included in the meta-analysis because many CSA researchers, as well as lay persons, view all types of socio-legally defined CSA as morally and/or psychologically harmful. When this research, the U.S. Congress, and the APA refer to CSA and "children" in the context of sexual relations with adults, they are not only referring to biological (prepubescent) children, but to adolescents under the age of consent as well; this age varies between 16 and 18 years old in the U.S.

The results of the meta-analysis indicated that college students who had experienced CSA were slightly less well-adjusted compared to other students who had not experienced CSA, but that family environment was a significant confound that may be responsible for the association between CSA and harm. Intense, pervasive harm and long-term maladjustment were due to confounding variables in most studies, rather than to the sexual abuse itself (though exceptions were noted for abuse accompanied by force or incest). Both studies addressed four "assumed properties" of CSA, identified by the authors: gender equivalence (both genders affected equally), causality (CSA causes harm), pervasiveness (most victims of CSA are harmed) and intensity (the harm is normally significant and long-term), concluding that all four "assumed properties" were questionable and had several potential confounds.

Based on the closely mirrored results of both studies, Rind, Tromovitch and Bauserman questioned the scientific validity of a single term "child sexual abuse" and suggested a variety of different labels for sexual contact between adults and non-adults based on age and the degree to which the child was forced or coerced into participating. They concluded with a discussion of the legal and moral implications of the article, stating that the "wrongfulness" and "harmfulness" of sexual acts are not inherently linked, and finished with the statement:

the findings of the current review do not imply that moral or legal definitions of or views on behaviors currently classified as CSA should be abandoned or even altered. The current findings are relevant to moral and legal positions only to the extent that these positions are based on the presumption of psychological harm.

— Rind et al. (1998) p. 47

== Controversies ==
The first set of peer reviewers for Psychological Bulletin, it was later discovered by researcher Stephanie J. Dallam, had "thoroughly" rejected the paper, and asked the authors not to submit it again. However, following a change of editors at the journal, they did resubmit the paper; this time, at least one of the new peer reviewers, who spoke to Dallam anonymously, turned it down. None of the other reviewers came forward, and it is still unknown what portion of the reviewers approved the paper, whether it passed peer review at all, and who, if anybody, recommended it for publication.

The paper was published by the American Psychological Association (APA) in July 1998, in Psychological Bulletin. Strong reactions ultimately resulted, from both psychologists and psychiatrists who study sexual abuse and treat victims, and from social conservatives and later, from most of the US Congress.

Scholars familiar with the literature on sexual abuse, as well as experts in the field, found the study's conclusions surprising.

=== Initial reactions ===
The first substantial public reaction was a December 1998 criticism by the National Association for Research & Therapy of Homosexuality, an organization dedicated to the discredited view that homosexuality is a mental illness that can be cured by psychotherapy.

In March 1999, conservative talk show host Laura Schlessinger criticized the study as "junk science" and stated that, since its conclusions were contrary to conventional wisdom, its findings should never have been released. She criticized the study's use of meta-analysis, saying. "I frankly have never seen this in general science. ... This [pooling of studies] is so outrageous." "This was not a study. They didn’t do a study. They arbitrarily found 59 studies that other people had done [and] combined them all."

Shortly thereafter, the North American Man/Boy Love Association posted an approving review of the study on their website, furthering the impression that the piece was an endorsement of pedophilia.

On March 28, columnist Debra Saunders published an article in the San Francisco Chronicle titled "Lolita Nation", in which she stated "the APA showed appalling judgment in printing this pedophilia propaganda", and wrote about the paper's findings, "most boys liked it, or didn't mind it, which is the same to the three researchers. Some girls – probably those they refer to as 'mature' – liked it, too. Heterosexual pedophiles have been making the same argument for years. The little girls liked it. The little girls wanted it. You expect that sort of cynical excuse from a cruel pervert, but you don't expect to read it in an APA journal."

=== Government ===
The paper eventually provoked a reaction from several conservative American members of Congress, notably the Republican representatives Matt Salmon of Arizona and Tom DeLay of Texas, who both condemned the study as advocating for the normalization of pedophilia.

In response, the APA declared in a press statement that child sexual abuse is harmful and wrong, and that the study was in no way an endorsement of pedophilia. The APA mandated a policy change by which APA journal editors would alert the organization of potentially controversial topics in order to be more proactive with politicians, the media and other groups. In an internal organization email, APA Executive Vice-President Raymond D. Fowler stated that, because of the controversy, the article's methodology, analysis, and the process by which it had been approved for publication had been reviewed and found to be sound. In June 1999, Fowler announced in an open letter to DeLay that there would be an independent review of the paper and stated that, from a public policy perspective, some language used in the article was inflammatory and inconsistent with the position of the APA's stance on CSA. The APA also implemented a series of actions designed to prevent the study from being used in legal arguments to defend CSA, and stated an independent review would be undertaken of the scientific accuracy and validity of the report. The request for an outside review of a controversial report by an independent scientific association was unprecedented in APA's 107-year history.

In April 1999, a resolution was introduced in the Alaska Legislature condemning the article, with similar resolutions introduced in California, Illinois, Louisiana, Oklahoma, and Pennsylvania over the subsequent two months. Some of these states' psychological associations reacted by asking the APA to take action.

On July 12, 1999, the United States House of Representatives passed HRC Resolution 107 by a vote of 355-0, with 13 members voting "Present", declaring sexual relations between children and adults are abusive and harmful, and condemned the study on the basis that it was being used by pro-pedophilia activists and organizations to promote and justify child sexual abuse. The condemnation by Congress of a scientific study was, at that time, an unprecedented event. The resolution passed the Senate by a voice vote (100-0) on July 30, 1999 and was greeted among psychologists with concern due to the perceived chilling effect it might have among researchers. Representative Brian Baird of Washington, who has a Ph.D. in clinical psychology and was one of the 13 Congressmen to abstain from the condemnation of the study, stated that of the 535 members of the House and Senate, fewer than 10 had actually read the study, and even fewer were qualified to evaluate it based on its merit.

=== Independent review ===
In September 1999, the American Association for the Advancement of Science (AAAS), upon a request by the APA to independently review the article, stated that it saw no reason to second-guess the peer review process that approved it initially and that it saw no evidence of improper methodology or questionable practices by the authors. The AAAS also expressed concern that the materials reviewed demonstrated a grave lack of understanding of the study on the part of the media and politicians and were also concerned about the misrepresentation of its findings. The AAAS stated that the responsibility for discovering problems with the article lay with the initial peer reviewers, and declined to evaluate the article, concluding with a statement that the decision to not review the article was neither an endorsement nor a criticism of it.

=== APA new position ===
In August 2000, the APA drafted and adopted a position statement in response to the Rind et al. controversy that opposed any efforts to censor controversial or surprising research findings, and asserting that researchers must be free to investigate and report findings, as long as the research has been conducted within appropriate ethical and research standards.

== Academic criticism and response ==
A series of 2001 papers published in the Journal of Child Sexual Abuse discussed and criticized the findings of the Rind et al. study. Stephanie Dallam stated that, after reviewing the evidence, the paper was best described as "an advocacy article that inappropriately uses science in an attempt to legitimatize its findings". Four other researchers also discussed possible flaws in the methodology and generalizability of Rind's findings, and concluded the paper's results were scientifically invalid. The criticisms were co-published in the 2001 book Misinformation Concerning Child Sexual Abuse and Adult Survivors. In 2002, a rebuttal to many of the claims made by critics was submitted to the APA journal, the American Psychologist by Scott Lilienfeld. After passing a normal peer review, the editor of the journal re-submitted the article in secret and, on the basis of this second review, the paper was rejected. Lilienfeld reported this subsequent rejection on several psychology Internet fora, which produced an intense response and resulted in the APA and American Psychologist ultimately printing the article as part of a special issue focusing on the controversy.

=== Possible sample bias ===
The paper has been criticized for restricting its analysis to convenience samples of college students, possibly introducing systematic bias by excluding victims so traumatized that they did not go on to attend college. Another possibility was that Rind et al.'s conclusions may not be generalizable beyond college populations in general as individuals with a history of CSA were more likely than non-abused individuals to drop out of college after a single semester.

Rind, Bauserman and Tromovitch responded to this criticism by saying that "the representativeness of college samples is in fact irrelevant to the stated goals and conclusions of our study" since the purpose of their research was "to examine the validity of the clinical concept" of CSA. They added that according to the commonly understood definition of the term, child sexual abuse is extremely and pervasively harmful, meaning that "in any population sampled - drug addicts, psychiatric patients, or college students - persons who have experienced CSA should show strong evidence of the assumed properties of CSA." The authors of the study say that because the college sample did not show pervasive harm, "the broad and unqualified claims about the properties of CSA are contradicted". Rind et al. also said that using college samples was appropriate because their study found similar prevalence rates and experiences of severity and outcomes between college samples and national samples.

=== Non-standardization of variables ===
Dallam et al. said that Rind et al. did not standardize their definition of child sexual abuse, leaving out certain studies that were appropriate, and including studies that were inappropriate. That is, they allege that Rind et al. uncritically combined data from studies of CSA with data from studies looking at other phenomena such as consensual peer experiences, sexual experiences that occurred during adulthood, and homosexual approaches during adolescence.

Rind, et al. have also responded to this criticism, defending the appropriateness of including all five of the studies (Landis, 1956; Schultz and Jones, 1983; Sedney and Brooks, 1984; Greenwald, 1994; and Sarbo, 1985) specifically identified by Dallam et al. as inappropriate to a study about child sexual abuse.

Dallam et al. said that the first three studies focused on all types of child sexual activity, not just child sexual abuse. Rind et al. reject this criticism. In regard to the Landis study, Rind et al. note that it has been used by many other sex researchers (e.g., Finkelhor, Fishman, Fromuth & Burkhart, Sarbo, and others) as an example of an early study about child sexual abuse. In regard to the Shultz and Jones study, Rind et al. concede that the study "looked at all types of 'sexual acts' before age 12," but explained that the respondents in the study were all asked "if their experience was with a person over the age of 16," thus allowing Rind et al. to include only the relationships that were age-discrepant. In regard to the Sedney and Brooks study, Rind et al. admit that the study used a broad definition of child sexual abuse, but explain that the researchers themselves chose to use such a definition "because of the difficulty posed by a priori decisions about what type of sexual experiences are 'problems.'"

Similarly, psychiatrist David Spiegel said that the inclusion of Landis' 1956 study was unjustified. He argued that, while weighting larger studies more than smaller makes sense, combining the results of a large study examining very mild trauma (such as fending off an attacker) with studies of long-term physical and sexual abuse was inappropriate and led to erroneous conclusions. Rind et al. replied that Spiegel misrepresented their analysis, since they did not use Landis' study in the meta-analysis of childhood sexual abuse – symptom correlations, but only for examining the self-reported effects of CSA. They contend that the way they handled Landis' data maximized negative reports and minimized the possible deflating effect of Landis' data on the overall effect sizes.

The last two studies, according to Dallam et al., were inappropriate because they included respondents who were over the age of 17 when the CSA occurred. Persons 18 years old or older are above the legal age of consent in all states of the USA, and thus are not "children" even in the loosest definition of the term. Rind et al. responded to Dallam et al. by saying that, in the effect-size calculations of the Sarbo and Greenwald studies (i.e., the calculations that show the alleged harmfulness of CSA), they had included only respondents aged 16 and 15 and under, respectively, at the time of the CSA and all CSA incidents included in Sarbo's and Greenwald's original analysis occurred before the age of 17.

=== Measured variables ===
Spiegel criticized that Rind et al. included a long list of measured variables in order to appear comprehensive, but remarkably omitted posttraumatic stress disorder - "the most salient symptom" - from their analysis. Rind et al. replied that including PTSD was impossible due to the fact that the original studies did not examine it. Furthermore, they cited Kendall-Tackett et al. to illustrate the lack of a common pattern of symptoms in children who have been abused.

=== Consent ===
David Spiegel also argued that Rind et al.'s suggestion of relabeling some forms of sexual encounters between adults and children/adolescents as adult-child (or adult-adolescent) sex is fundamentally flawed, because children cannot give meaningful consent to sexual relations with an adult. Some critics also argued that using value-neutral terminology would normalize CSA and that redefining terminology is not in the interest of the general public because it confuses the underlying moral issues. Rind et al. replied that the construct of consent used in their study was misinterpreted by critics; they only asserted that children/adolescents are capable of simple consent (willingness) as opposed to informed consent used in legal contexts, and used this as a variable in their study simply because it was used in the original studies - where it had predictive validity. Thus, they conclude that although the construct of willingness might be morally unacceptable, it is a scientifically valid term. A similar argument was put forward by Oellerich, who stated that considering all adult/non-adult sexual behavior as abusive and lacking consent can lead to bias in scientific research in the area, and that recognizing this distinction does not necessarily lead to considering adult/non-adult sexual interactions as morally permissible.

=== Statistical errors ===
Dallam et al. also contend that Rind et al. miscoded or misreported significant amounts of the underlying study data, thereby skewing the results. Dallam et al. contend that Rind et al. incorrectly used "Pearson's r" instead of "Cohen's d" to calculate the effect size, which resulted in a failure to correct for base-rate differences of CSA in male and female samples, and which led to the finding that males were less harmed by CSA. After correcting for base-rate attenuation, Dallam et al. said they arrived at identical effect sizes for male and female samples.

In response to this criticism, Rind et al. contend that they did indeed describe the contrast between the effect size estimates as "nonsignificant, z = 1.42, p > .10, two-tailed". However, they argue, "What [they] did report as significantly different was the contrast between male and female effect size estimates for the all-types-of-consent groups, where r_{u}s = .04 and .11, respectively. In "follow[ing] Dallam et al. (2001) [by] apply[ing] Becker's correction formula to these values, they become r_{c}s = .06 and .12 for men and women, respectively. The contrast is still statistically significant (z = 2.68, p < .01. two-tailed), contrary to Dallam et al.'s (2001) claim".

Rind et al. said that their own "handling of Pearson's r in the face of base-rate differences was methodologically proper and produced no important bias, if any at all." Furthermore, they contend that Dallam's criticisms "exhibited bias ... [by] selectively ignoring key clarifying quotes ... and citing them elsewhere in their critique to argue different points, and [by] ignoring or overlooking a key caveat by Becker (1986) regarding appropriate use of his correction formula".

Critics also argued that Rind et al.'s statistical approach for controlling for family environment as a cause of maladjustment was conceptually and methodologically invalid. Spiegel stated that inferring the source of maladjustment from analyzing the shared variance between CSA and family environment does not answer the question of which variable explains maladjustment better; the authors answered that this statement shows a misunderstanding of the statistical procedure used their meta-analysis. Dallam, however, addressed the topic of several prior studies having found statistically significant relations between CSA and maladjustment even after controlling for family environment.

=== Conceptual issues ===
Rind et al.'s model of "assumed properties of child sexual abuse," (that is, of universal and pervasive harm in all victims of CSA) has been criticized as a straw man assertion in that it is both simplistic and misleading. The reactions of victims in their adult lives have been found to be extremely varied, ranging from severe to nearly unnoticeable, and many pathologies are not diagnosable in the strictly clinical sense Rind uses. Victims often have a flawed or distorted appraisal of their abuse, minimize the impact as adults often do with traumatic events, and fail to connect distressing and sometimes debilitating pathologies with their experiences. Further, these studies make no accounting for emotional support of the victim's family, clinical treatment of the victim prior to the study, or personal resiliency, which can easily account for less severe outcomes.

=== Possible bias ===
Rind, Bauserman and Tromovitch stated that research findings can be skewed by an investigator's personal biases, and in Rind et al. claimed that "[r]eviewers who are convinced that CSA is a major cause of adult psychopathology may fall prey to confirmation bias by noting and describing study findings indicating harmful effects but ignoring or paying less attention to findings indicating nonnegative outcomes". They defended their deliberate choice of non-legal and non-clinical samples, accordingly avoiding individuals who received psychological treatment or were engaged in legal proceedings as a way of correcting this bias through the use of a sample of college students.

Dallam noted that Rind, Bauserman, and Tromovitch had all been associated with pedophilia advocacy organizations in the past. In the years before the paper was written, both Rind and Bauserman had published articles in Paidika: The Journal of Paedophilia, a journal published in the Netherlands, and which, per its own "Statement of Purpose", was explicitly dedicated to "[demonstrating] that pedophilia has been, and remains, a legitimate and productive part of the totality of human experience". Dallam additionally noted that following the publication of their meta-analysis, Rind, Bauserman, and Tromovitch were keynote speakers at a pedophile advocacy conference occurring in the Netherlands. The full text of their speech was subsequently reprinted in the January 1999 International Pedophile and Child Emancipation Newsletter.

== Citation outside of scholarly discussions ==
Despite the authors' comments that the findings of the paper "do not imply that moral or legal definitions of or views on behaviors currently classified as CSA" should be changed, the study caught the attention of, and was used by, advocates for pedophilia. It has been used to argue that the age of consent should be lowered.

Social psychologist Carol Tavris noted several groups who reacted negatively to the study. The anti-homosexuality group National Association for Research & Therapy of Homosexuality (NARTH), who "[endorse] the long-discredited psychoanalytic notion that homosexuality is a mental disorder and that it is a result of seduction in childhood by an adult", objected to the study's implications that boys who are sexually abused are not traumatized for life and do not become homosexuals as a result. Therapists who supported the existence of recovered memories and recovered-memory therapy, as well as those who attributed mental illnesses such as dissociative identity disorder, depression and eating disorders to repressed memories of sexual abuse also rejected the study. Tavris attributed this rejection to the fear of malpractice lawsuits. Tavris expressed her belief that the study could have been interpreted positively as an example of psychological resilience in the face of adversity, and noted that CSA causing little or no harm in some individuals is not an endorsement of the act, nor does it make it any less illegal.

== Subsequent research and legacy ==
Numerous research studies as well as expert opinion in the field of psychology, both before and after Rind et al's publications, have long supported the stance that children cannot consent to sexual activity and that child and adolescent sexual abuse cause harm. The then-American Psychological Association CEO Raymond D. Fowler succinctly reiterated the prevailing view in a 1999 letter to Congressman Delay "that children cannot consent to sexual activity with adults," and "sexual activity between children and adults should never be considered or labeled as harmless or acceptable".

A study by Heather Ulrich and two colleagues published in The Scientific Review of Mental Health Practice attempted to replicate the Rind study, correcting for methodological and statistical problems identified by Dallam and others. It supported some of the Rind findings, both with respect to the percentage of variance in later psychological outcome accounted for by sexual abuse and in relation to the finding that there was a gender difference in the experience of child sexual abuse, such that females reported more negative effects. It, however, acknowledged the limitations of the findings (college student sample, self-report data), and did not endorse Rind's recommendation to abandon the use of the term child sexual abuse in cases of apparent consent in favor of the term adult-child sex. In their conclusion, the authors address the objection that Rind's work and their own would give support to those who deny that child sexual abuse can cause harm: "The authors of the current research would hesitate to support such a general statement. Instead, our results, and the results of the Rind et al. meta-analysis, can be interpreted as providing a hopeful and positive message to therapists, parents, and children. Child sexual abuse does not necessarily lead to long-term harm."

There has been greater emphasis in subsequent work on the range of responses that are possible from victims. For example, a few studies make reference to the paper's findings about "consensual" encounters, but approach it from the opposite direction (i.e., that the use of force causes more intense negative outcomes). Heather Ulrich, author of the aforementioned replication of the meta-analysis, later drew on the findings to study the reasons for the variability in outcomes of CSA victims, such as attributional style (individual's causal explanations for why the abuse occurred), family environment, and social support.

== See also ==
- Age disparity in sexual relationships
- Replication crisis
- Statutory rape
