= Raukura Hetet =

New Zealand lesbian club founder (1940–1993)

- Born: Raukura Te Aroha Hetet; 21 June 1940; Tokaanu, New Zealand
- Died: 3 September 1993 (aged 53); Auckland, New Zealand
- Other names: Bubs Hetet
- Known for: Co-founding New Zealand's first lesbian establishment

Raukura Te Aroha "Bubs" Hetet (21 June 1940 – 3 September 1993) was a New Zealander who co-founded the KG Club, New Zealand's first lesbian bar.

== Early life and family ==
Hetet was born on 21 June 1940 in Tokaanu to Charles Wilson Pekapeka Hetet and Ririana Te Rewha Smallman. She was of Ngāti Tūwharetoa and Ngāti Maniapoto descent. She had three older brothers and two younger sisters.

Hetet's father worked for the Department of Public Works, and consequently, the family moved frequently during her childhood. She attended Queen Victoria Maori Girls School and Te Kuiti High School.

== Career ==
Hetet left school and completed a range of casual employment stints. These included farm work, orchard work and working in a hotel. She then got a job with the New Zealand Post Office in Tokaanu and later joined the Women's Royal New Zealand Air Force, working as a driver. She was honourably discharged from the air force in 1968. Hetet then relocated to Auckland and worked as a supervisor for the Post Office.

In 1972, Hetet co-founded the KG Club (Karangahape Road Girls' Club or Kamp Girls' Club). She noted the KG Club was intended to provide a space of congregation for Auckland's lesbian community. The KG Club was originally situated on Karangahape Road, but shifted locations a number of times.

Hetet later relocated to Tūrangi, where she continued to work for New Zealand Post, and also purchased a restaurant in Te Kūiti.

== Personal life ==
Hetet was a lesbian, and identified as 'kamp'. She recalled various short relationships in her days of casual employment as well as several long-term relationships with women later in life. It has been speculated that her discharge from the Women's Royal New Zealand Air Force and recommendation not to re-enlist was due to her sexuality. She recalled that other lesbian women within the air force had been dishonourably discharged.

She was introduced to Auckland's 'kamp' scene in 1961, when she visited the Ca d'Oro Coffee Lounge, a popular meeting place for the queer community of the time. During this visit, she was involved in an altercation where several people mistook her for a gay man, which led to a fight, and the police were called. The altercation was documented in the tabloid NZ Truth and she was concerned that she would lose her job. Hetet was involved in another incident in 1962 where the husband of a woman she was seeing wrote to the New Zealand Post Office (her employer) detailing the relationship and questioning her character. An investigation was launched by the Post Office but was subsequently dropped.

In 1970, Hetet purchased a house in the Auckland suburb of Ponsonby. During her time in Auckland, she was heavily involved in the 'kamp' scene and hosted events for Auckland's queer community. Hetet became disillusioned with the KG Club that she co-founded due to the exclusionary culture promoted by some of its patrons. She regretted the fact that she could not invite her queer friends who were not cisgender women.

Hetet was known to enjoy travelling overseas, particularly to Australia, Greece and Italy.

From 1990 until 1992, Hetet lived in Tūrangi to be closer to her mother. She returned to Auckland after her mother's death in 1992. Hetet was diagnosed with lung cancer in November 1992, and died on 3 September 1993, aged 53.
