= Christchurch Pride =

Pride festival in Christchurch, New Zealand

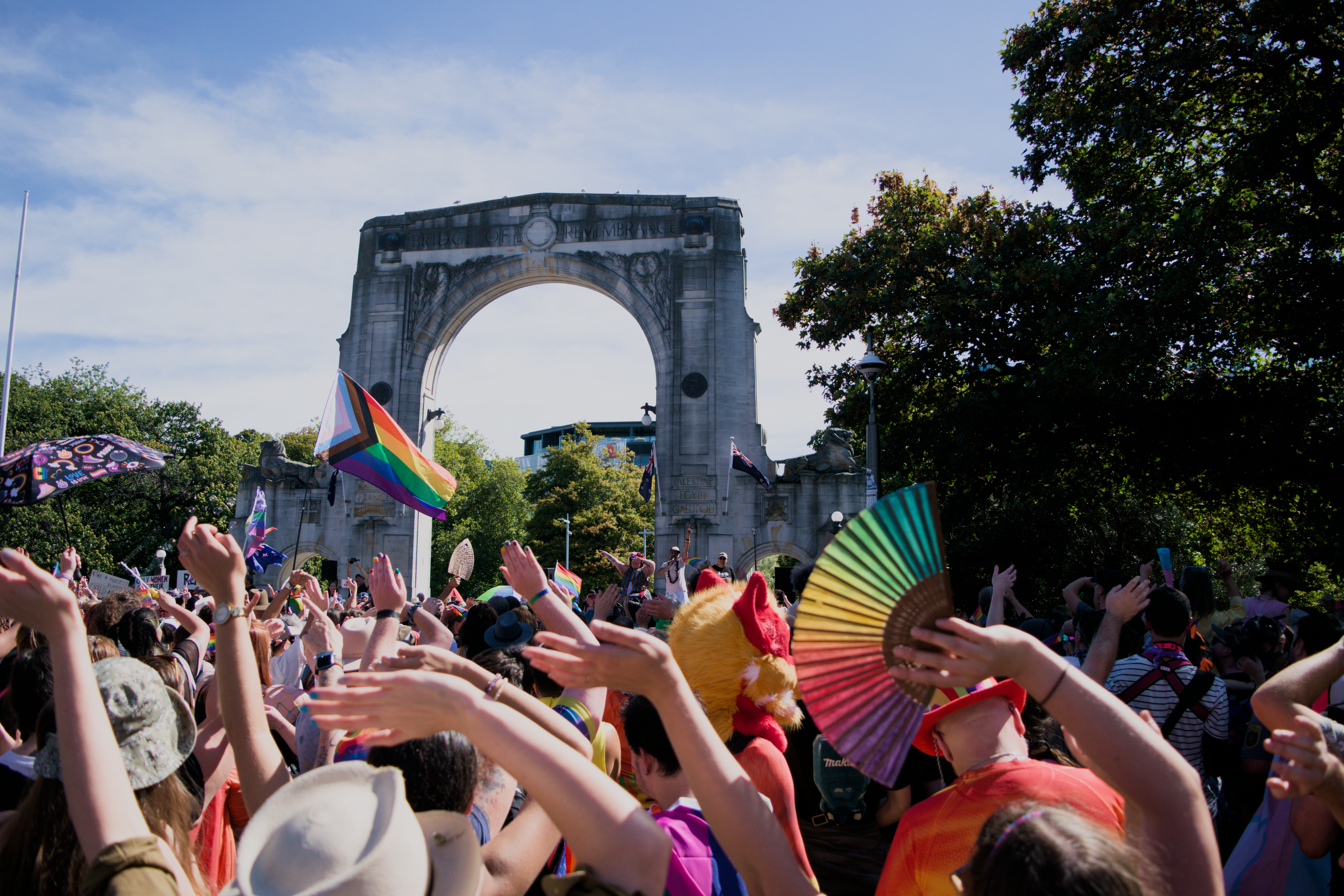
- Christchurch Pride 2025 "Walk for Support" opening event
- Frequency: Annual
- Location: Christchurch
- Country: New Zealand
- Inaugurated: 2004

Christchurch Pride is a festival that takes place every year in Christchurch, New Zealand. It celebrates the diversity of LGBT people in the city. The festival lasts between a week and a month. It begins with a Pride parade, which over a thousand people attend. The celebration also includes events like art installations, drag shows, dances, library activities, bingo, and pet parades. Different buildings and businesses are decorated with Pride flags.

Unlike in other countries, where these celebrations take place in June in honour of Pride Month, Christchurch Pride is celebrated in March, to have better weather and not compete with similar events elsewhere in New Zealand, like Auckland Pride and Wellington Pride. However, sometimes the event has moved to June, for example in 2022 when it was postponed until then because of the COVID-19 pandemic. Another difference between this and similar events is that Christchurch Pride tends to be more community-oriented.

== History ==
Pride celebrations in Christchurch began in the 1970s. In June 1974, a Gay Pride Week took place in the city. It included a march that began in the Plaza Victoria and a dance in Hagley Hall. In 1977, the local newspaper The Press published an announcement that LGBT activisits were planning Gay Pride Week events in Cathedral Square. Supporters were asked to wear pink triangles to show their support. A similar effort took place in 1979, with supporters asked to wear pink carnations for International Gay Solidarity Day.

In its current incarnation, Christchurch Pride began in 2004. The following year, the festival began for the first time to have a detailed, week-long calendar of events, which included dances, drag shows, a showing of The Rocky Horror Show, and a candlelight vigil in honour of victims of the HIV/AIDS pandemic. In total, about a thousand participants attended these events. By 2008, attendance at Pride Week had reached 1500 people. That year's festival was notable for including the premiere of Through Rainbow Coloured Glasses, which explored the LGBT history of the city.

Because of the struggles caused by the Christchurch and Canterbury earthquakes in 2010 and 2011, Christchurch Pride struggled to find venues and funding for events for several years. The first event held after the earthquakes was in 2013.

The COVID-19 pandemic affected some of the activities planned for the 2021 event, but others went on, with about 450 attending the closing party. In 2022, the festival was postponed from March to June due to the ongoing pandemic.

In 2023, the festival returned to March. It started on 10 March with the third year of the "Walk for Support" Pride parade. That year, 700 people attended, following a route from Ballantynes Department Store and following Cashel Street to the Bridge of Remembrance, where artistic performances were held. The festival lasted until 19 March. The following year, organisers stated that the Walk for Support had double the attendance from when it started. It also included the presence of legislators and local council members, including Kahurangi Carter and Sara Templeton.

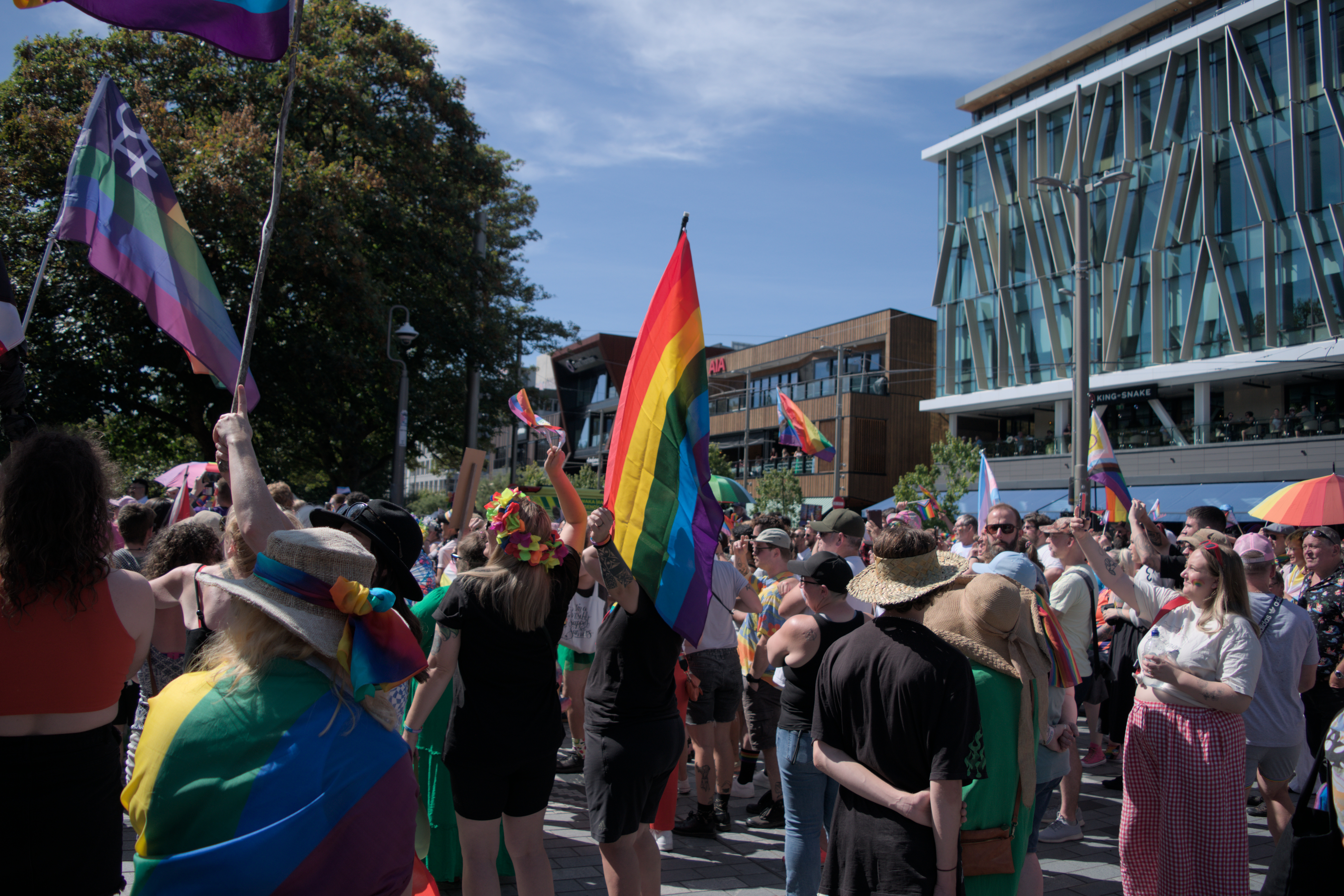
Christchurch Pride 2025 "Walk for Support" opening event.

The 2025 event is the longest so far, lasting for the entire month of March rather than just one week. The opening Pride parade surpassed a thousand attendees. A small group of members of the fundamentalist organisation Destiny Church were present as protestors, making abusive and threatening comments at attendees. They were largely drowned out by the music and speakers on stage.

== See also ==
- LGBTQ people in New Zealand
- Auckland Pride Festival
- Wellington Pride Festival
