= Anna Salter =

American psychologist

Anna C. Salter is an American psychologist and a mystery novelist. She is the author of several non-fiction books including Predators: Pedophiles, Rapists, and Other Sex Offenders: Who They Are, How They Operate, and How We Can Protect Our Children (2003), and Treating Child Sex Offenders and Victims (1988). Salter has been a teaching fellow at Tufts University and Harvard University.

== Education, clinical and research work ==
In 1968, Salter earned a BA in English and Philosophy from the University of North Carolina. Her Masters was in Child Development at Tufts University (1973), and her Ph.D. in Clinical Psychology and Public Practice at Harvard University (1977).

Salter has an emphasis in sex crimes. She has treated the victims of sex crimes, and also has studied offenders. She has published several books and peer-reviewed articles on sex crimes, given many keynote speeches to professional and law enforcement groups, and consults with the Wisconsin Department of Corrections.

Additionally, Salter has interviewed numerous sex offenders and other criminals, compiling the videotaped interviews along with her commentary and analysis. Truth, Lies and Sex Offenders is for general audiences, and Sadistic Offenders: How They Think, What They Do is aimed at professionals and law enforcement.

== Fiction ==
As of 2011, Salter has also published five mystery novels: Shiny Water, Fault Lines, White Lies, Prison Blues and Truth Catcher. Prison Blues was nominated for a 2003 Edgar Award for best paperback original.

== Selected bibliography ==
Sorted chronologically.

- "Treating Abusive Parents," Child Welfare, 64(4): 327–241, July–August 1985. (co-authored with S. Kairys and C. Richardson), PMID 4017706
- "Working with Abused Preschoolers: A Guide for Caretakers." Child Welfare, 64(4): 343–356, July–August 1985. (co-authored with C. Richardson and P. Martin)
- Treating Child Sex Offenders and Victims. Newbury Park, CA: Sage Publications, 1988
- "Response to the 'Abuse of the child sexual abuse accommodation syndrome.'" Journal of Child Sexual Abuse. V. 1(4), pp. 173–177, 1992.
- Transforming Trauma: A Guide to Understanding and Treating Survivors of Child Sexual Abuse. Newbury Park, CA: Sage Publications, 1995
- "Confessions of a Whistle Blower: Lessons Learned." Ethics and Behavior. 8(2), 1998, pp. 115–124
- Predators: Pedophiles, Rapists, and Other Sex Offenders: Who They Are, How They Operate, and How We Can Protect Our Children. New York: Basic Books, 2003.
