= The Charlotte Museum =

Lesbian museum in Auckland, New Zealand

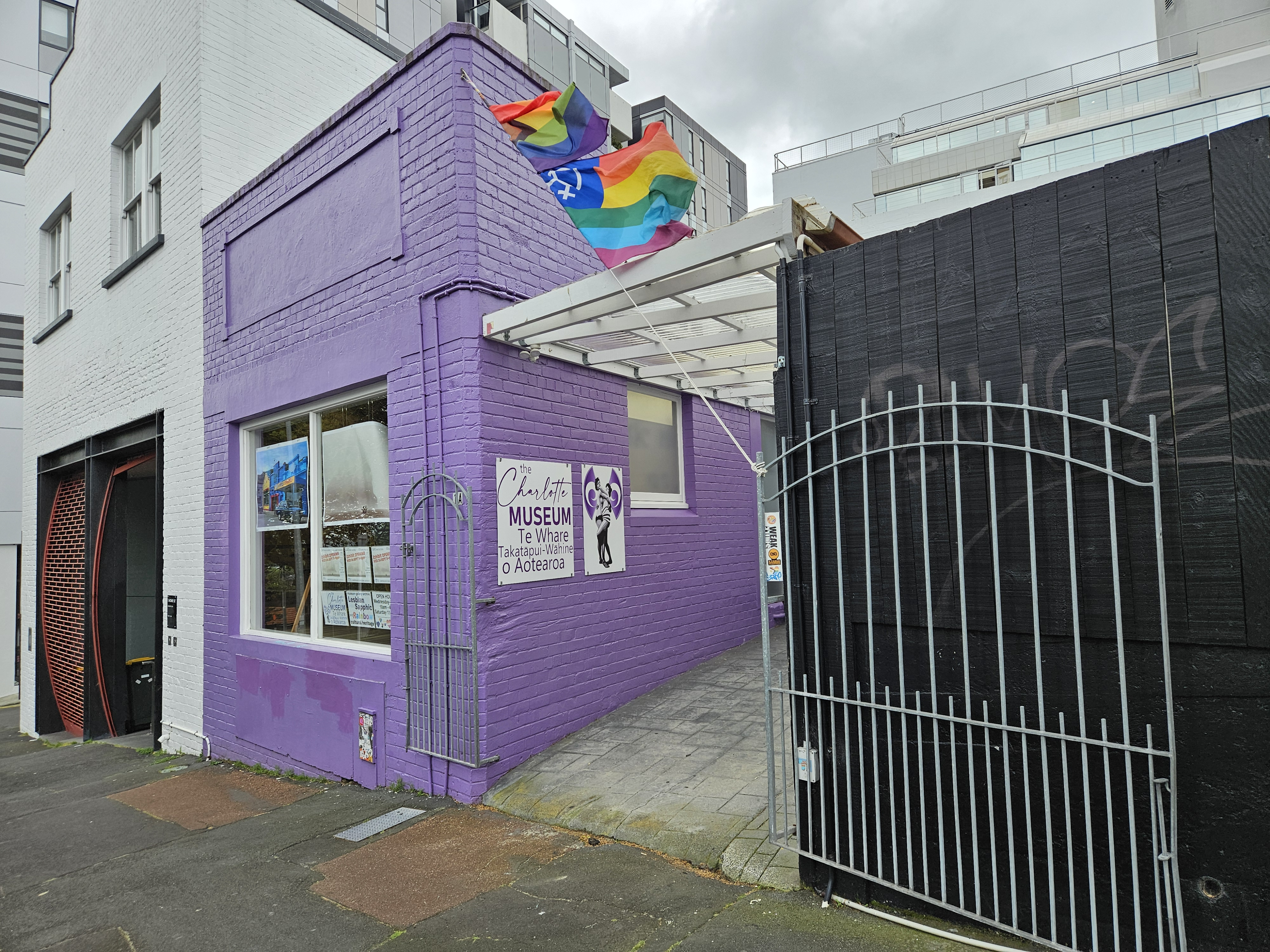
- Charlotte Museum Te Whare Takatāpui-Wāhine o Aotearoa, the permanent location of the museum on Howe Street, Auckland, New Zealand
- Alternative names: Te Whare Takatāpui-Wāhine o Aotearoa

General information
- Location: 1A Howe Street, Freemans Bay, Auckland 1010, New Zealand
- Coordinates: 36°51′27″S 174°45′18″E

Other information
- Facilities: Museum | Gallery | The Saphira Research Library & Document Archive

Website
- Official homepage

The Charlotte Museum Te Whare Takatāpui-Wāhine o Aotearoa, is a museum dedicated to lesbian histories in Auckland, New Zealand, located off Karangahape Road at 1A Howe Street, Freemans Bay, Auckland, New Zealand, Aotearoa. It is the only museum in the world dedicated solely to lesbian culture and history.

== Background ==
The purpose of the Charlotte Museum Te Whare Takatāpui-Wahine o Aotearoa is to collect, preserve, record and display lesbian herstory and cultural experience and the cultural heritage of LGBTQIA+ communities in Aotearoa. As well as being a museum, it is home to the Saphira Research Library & Document Archive, is a Community Art Gallery and a community space used by LGBTQIA+ Communities for events and activities. The museum regularly hosts a range of events and activities such as walking tours, artist and educator talks focused on lesbian histories, and social events including speed dating, music nights, movie nights and quiz nights. They have a student internship programme organised with the teritary institutions such as AUT, and University of Auckland. People donate their items and objects to the collections of lesbian and LGBTQIA+ cultural material to be preserved, furthering the idea of a collective effort to preserve and display lesbian and LGBTQIA+ cultural heritage.

== History ==
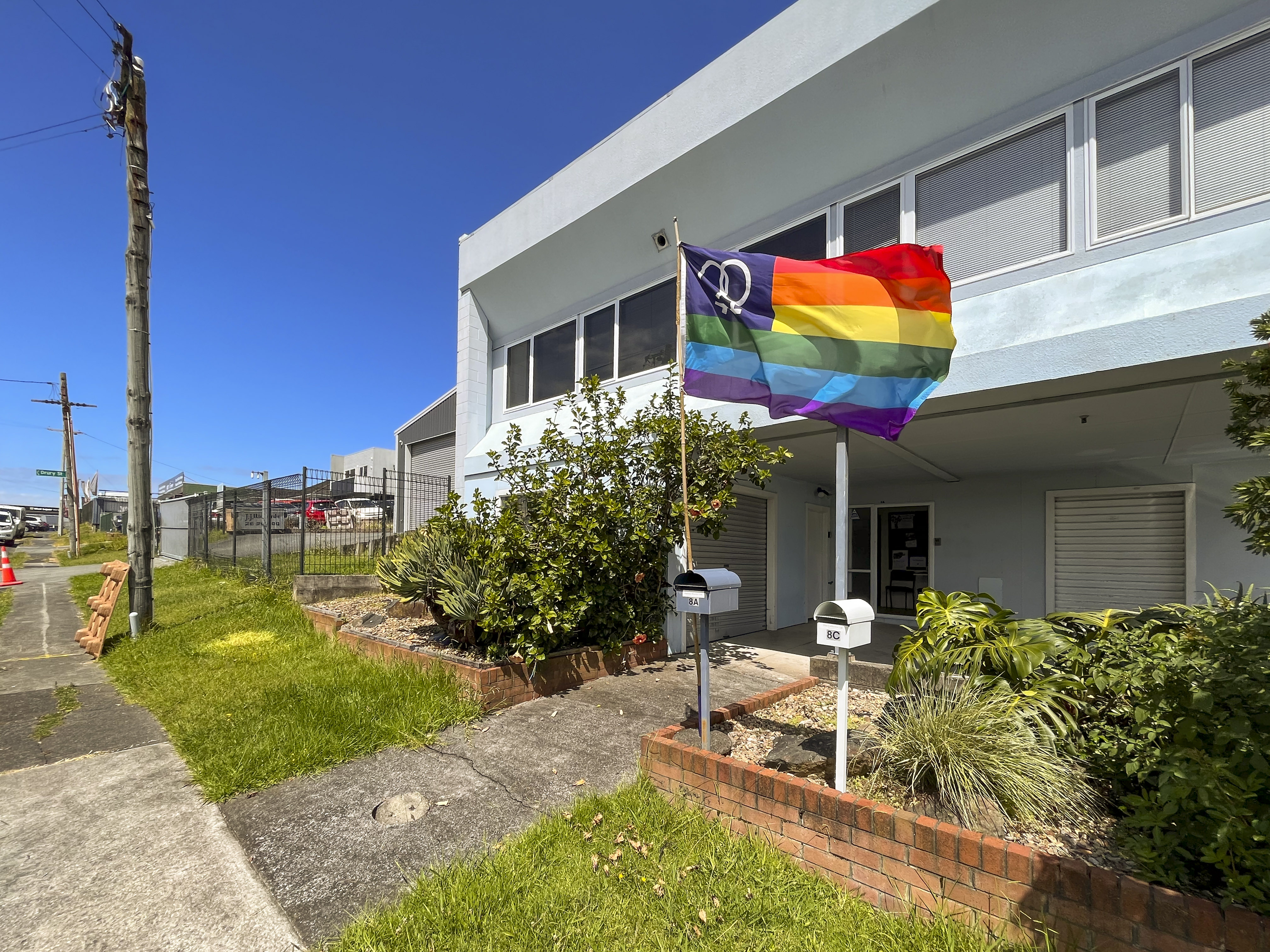
Charlotte Museum in New Lynn location, 2022

In the early 2000s, a group of Auckland lesbians set out up an Archive Group where they wrote down and recorded their stories and encouraged their friends to do the same. These records were then sent to what was then called Lesbian and Gay Archive New Zealand (LAGANZ), now the Kawe Mahara Queer Archives Aotearoa. Dr Miriam Saphia CNZM was a member of the archive group and travelled to Wellington in 2004 for a conference, taking several items with her - quilts made from lesbian t-shirts and her badge collection - with the intention of gifting them to LAGANZ. However these items were turned away by LAGANZ, because they are a predominantly document archive, so were not able to hold or care for objects in their collection. This resulted in tangible and visible lesbian culture at threat of being permanently lost. The Archive Group went on to change the status of lesbian culture in public history at a time when there were mostly no accessible public records on lesbian life. Subsequently in response to LAGANZ's position the Charlotte Museum Trust was set up by Miriam Saphira, Nicola Jackson, Christine Hammerton and Paula Wallis in 2007 to preserve and build up lesbian histories.This charitable trust emerged on 7 May 2007 in recognition of the Charlotte Museum being an organisation that benefits the public at large.

In 2008, the Charlotte Museum Trust published a book "Remember Us: Women Who Love Women, from Sappho to Gay Liberation" edited by Miriam Saphira. It is an overview of lesbian history and culture, with a particular focus on New Zealand and Pacific lesbian history.

The ethos of the museum was to represent the lives of ordinary lesbian women, not just the famous and well known. The Charlotte Museum is named after Charlotte Prime (Ngāpuhi) and Charlotte Smith (Ngāpuhi), two lesbian women who were regular members of the KG Club. and activily involved in community. It was decided to use their name to reflect the museum's purpose to celebrate the lives of ordinary lesbians. Its first physical location was in Surrey Crescent, Grey Lynn, in 2008, a year after the Charlotte Museum Trust had been established. In 2010, the museum relocated to Linwood Ave, Mt Albert then in 2014 it moved to 8a Bentinck Street in New Lynn and then to its current location at 1a Howe Street, Freemans Bay in June 2023. The museum relies on public funding and donations to keep operating.

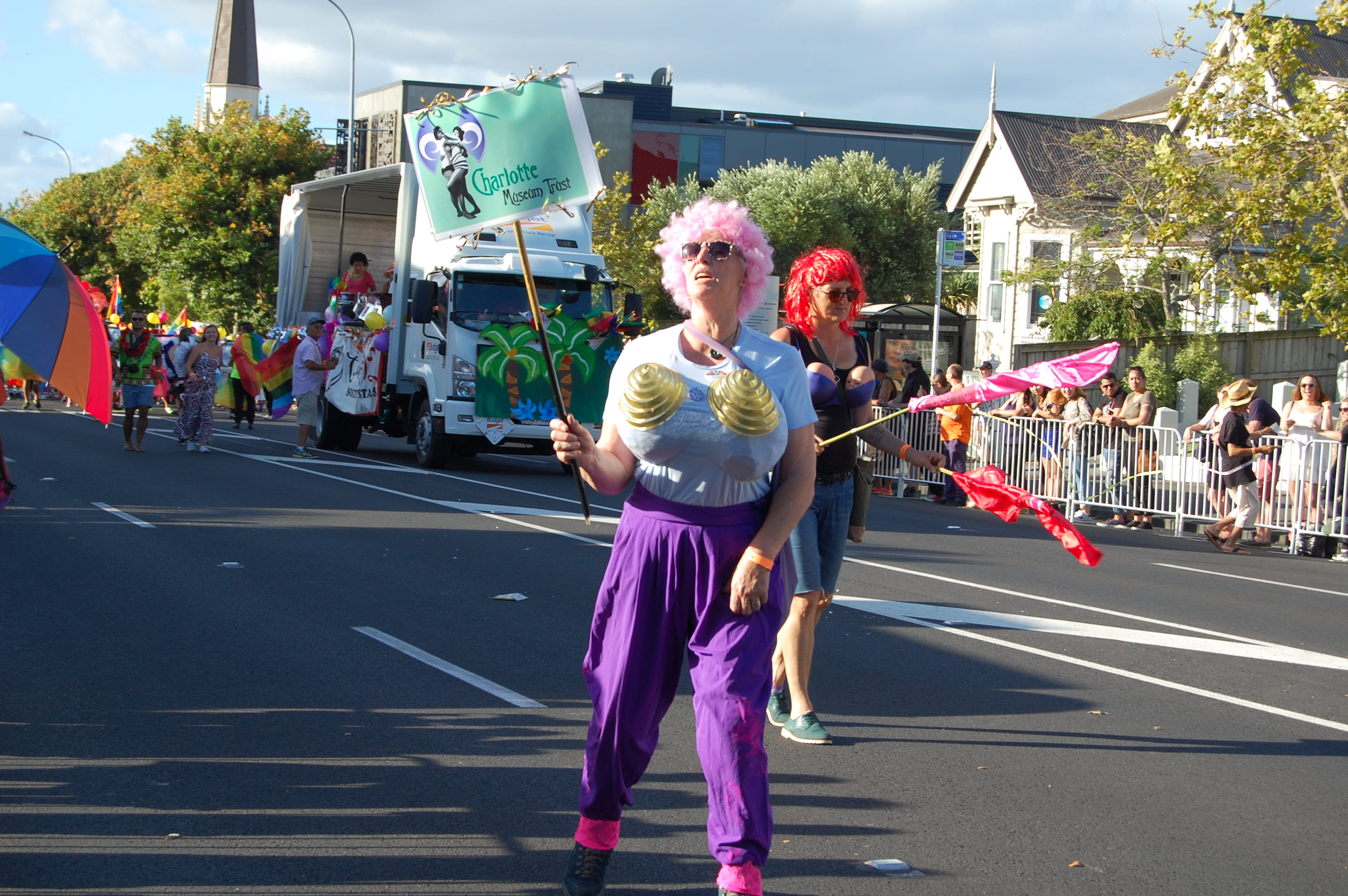
Charlotte Museum Trust, Auckland Pride Parade 2016

In 2022, Miriam Saphira was appointed a Companion of the New Zealand Order of Merit for services to the LGBTQIA+ community, after which she said her proudest work was her involvement in Homosexual Law Reform and Charlotte Museum Te Whare Takat ā pui-Wahine o Aotearoa.

== Recent Exhibitions ==
Exhibition	Year	Location	Artist(s) Exhibited
SafeKeeping	2021	New Lynn	Veronica Slater
Mother Nature is a Lesbian	2022	New Lynn	group show
SPACES by Dar'ya Starykovaa: Photographic Exhibition	2022	New Lynn	Dar'ya Starykovaa
Pride and Protest 1972–2022	2022	Te Atatū Peninsula Community Hub	Auckland Heritage Festival display
Seen & Heard	2023	Studio One Toi Tū Gallery Pop Up, 238 Karangahape Road	Fiona Clark
Lesbian Road Trip Art Show	2023	New Lynn	group show
View of OUR Street	2023	Freemans Bay	Melanie Church
FLICKS Film & TV Festival	2024	Freemans Bay	Pride Film Festival
Miriam Saphira: the last "One Night Stand"	2024	Freemans Bay	Miriam Saphira
Thresholds	2024	Freemans Bay	The PulseArt Collective
Va'ine Warrior Sculpture and Carving Exhibit	2025	Freemans Bay	Tui Hobson
