= KG Club =

Defunct lesbian club in Auckland, New Zealand

- Promotional poster for an event hosted by the KG Club
- Address: 200 Karangahape Road
- Location: Auckland
- Type: Lesbian club

Construction
- Opened: 1972
- Closed: 1985

The KG Club (Karangahape Road Girls' Club or Kamp Girls' Club) was a prominent community centre in Auckland, New Zealand. It was known as one of New Zealand's first lesbian clubs.

== History ==
The KG Club was founded in 1972 by a group of women including Raukura Te Aroha "Bubs" Hetet. In a later interview, Hetet noted that there was a prominent lesbian community in Auckland at the time, but they lacked a space to congregate. Consequently, the KG Club was formed.

The KG Club was originally located upstairs at 200 Karangahape Road, in a building previously used as a hair salon. However, the club subsequently relocated at least three times between 1971 and 1985 due to ongoing financial and liquor licensing issues. After vacating 200 Karangahape Road, the KG club moved to various sites including Saint Kevin's Arcade, Beach Road and Albert Street and then upstairs at the corner of K'Rd and Helburn Street.

At the time, New Zealand law prevented women from obtaining liquor licenses. This meant that much of the trading carried out by the KG Club was illegal and the premises were subject to several police raids. One particular raid in 1978 led to the closure of the Beach Road site. Viot notes that restrictive licensing policies such as these were partially responsible for the club nearing liquidation in 1979.

The KG Club was entirely volunteer-operated with the exception of the club's two cleaners, Joanna and Janet. The venue hosted a range of community events and workshops, including training classes for women, weddings, film and music events, as well as discussions on important matters such as racism, parenting and issues faced by Māori and Pacific people. The club also expanded its services as the Inner City Women's Recreation Centre, becoming the training location for weightlifters and a local softball team, in addition to hosting organisations like the Lesbian Action Group.

Throughout the history of the KG Club, patrons and volunteers often found themselves disagreeing with management. Hetet, despite being a supportive founding member, expressed disappointment in the strict 'women-only' policy adopted at times by the KG Club, and its subsequent exclusion of many of her queer friends who were not women. Early in the KG Club's history, men were permitted entry one night per week but this open night policy was later reversed.

The club closed in 1985. The Charlotte Museum Te Whare Takatāpuhi-Wāhine o Aotearoa, a lesbian history museum in Auckland, takes its name from two former members of the KG Club, Charlotte Prime and Charlotte Smith.
