= Ca d'Oro Coffee Lounge =

Defunct coffee shop and LGBT venue in Auckland, New Zealand

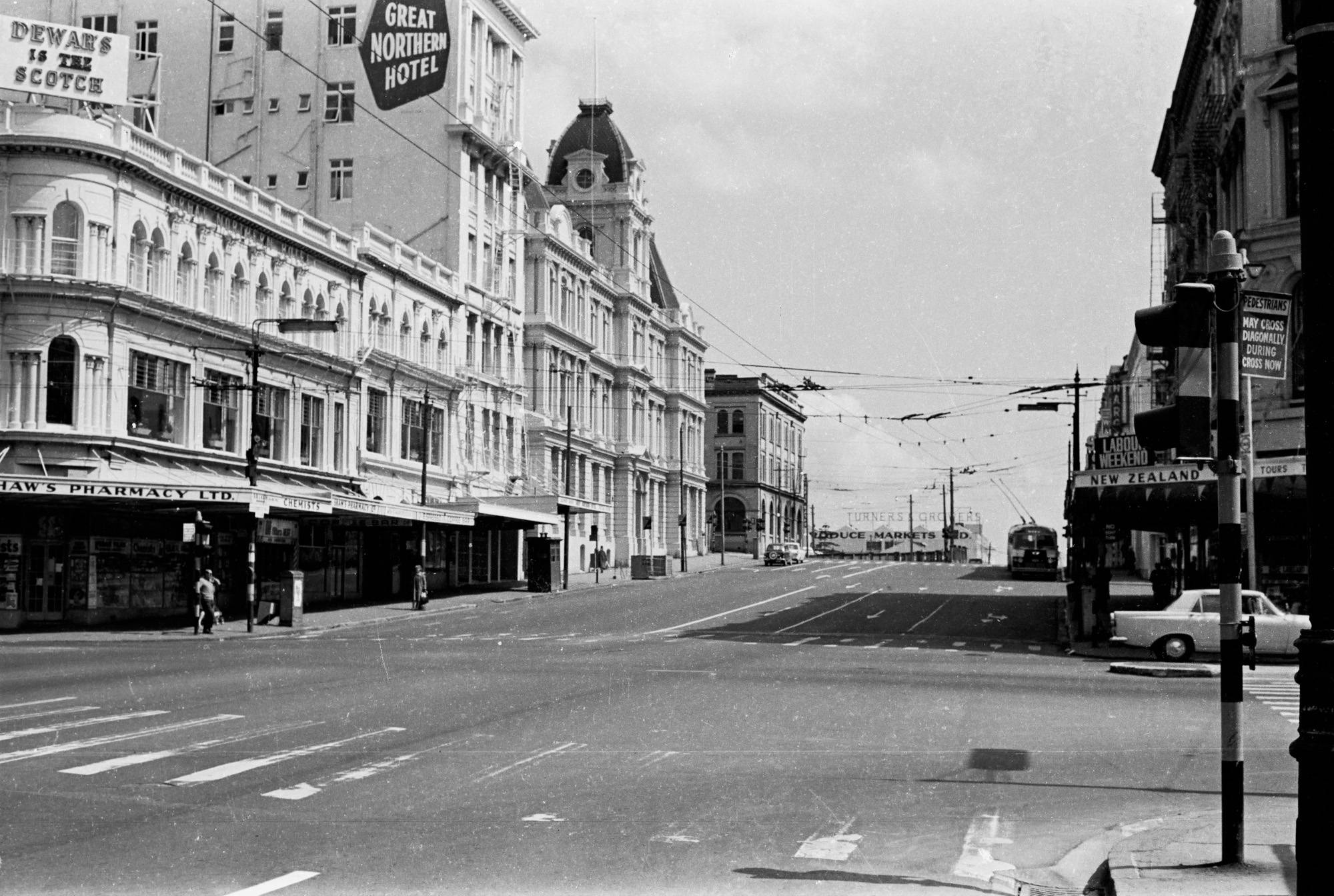
- Customs Street West in the mid-1960s
- Address: Customs Street West; Auckland; New Zealand
- Location: Auckland
- Type: Coffee bar

Construction
- Opened: 1957
- Closed: 1974

The Ca d'Oro Coffee Lounge was a prominent coffee bar located in Auckland, New Zealand. Opened in 1957 on Customs Street West in the Auckland CBD, it was one of the city's first coffee bars and a well-known site within the local LGBT community. The lounge was one of the only late-night establishments in the city until it closed in 1974.

== History ==
The Ca d'Oro was opened in 1957 by actor Harold Kissin and Memé Churton, a well-known personality in the arts sector, on Customs Street West.

Churton, who was born in Italy, was underwhelmed with New Zealand's food and coffee culture. She sought to create an establishment that was more characteristic of European cafes. Kissin's family owned a jewelry shop in Customs Street that was struggling. He and Churton converted this site into the Ca d'Oro Coffee Lounge, which translates to 'House of Gold' in Italian. Kissin and Churton had an espresso machine imported in order to start the establishment. The lounge was designed by Peter Smeele, and had a large steel mural in the shape of a gondola which was created by prominent Dutch designer Frank Carpay.

Unlike most bars, coffee houses were not subject to liquor laws requiring establishments to close at 6pm. Consequently, the Ca d'Oro would operate from 9am-12am, and would avert the strict liquor laws by serving alcohol in coffee cups after-hours. It was labelled as eccentric for its time and had a significant LGBTQ+ client base. In particular, the Ca d'Oro was popular amongst gay men due to its proximity to the wharf, and the presence of visiting sailors looking for sexual encounters. It was also near other well-known queer spaces of the time, such as the Blake's Inn on Vulcan Lane and the Lilypond on Queen Street.

Roy Jackson, a waiter at the Ca d'Oro, was killed onboard the Whangaroa ship in Napier in 1960. The attack has since been perceived as an instance of gay-bashing. Jackson's assailants were acquitted of manslaughter charges.

Ca D'Oro Ltd. was dissolved as a company in 1974.
