= Marewa Glover =

New Zealand public health academic

- Education: University of Auckland
- Scientific career
- Fields: Smoking cessation
- Workplaces: Massey University
- Thesis: The Effectiveness of a Maori Noho Marae smoking cessation intervention: utilising a kaupapa Maori methodology (2000)

Marewa Glover is a New Zealand public health academic specialising in smoking cessation. She has worked at the University of Auckland and been a full professor at Massey University. She set up the Centre for Research Excellence: Indigenous Sovereignty and Smoking (COREISS) in 2018.

== Academic career ==
After a 2000 PhD titled The Effectiveness of a Maori Noho Marae smoking cessation intervention: utilising a kaupapa Maori methodology at the University of Auckland, she moved to the Massey University, rising to full professor.

Glover is long time smoking-reduction researcher, who switched from supporting tobacco taxes to opposing them for hurting the most vulnerable.

Glover's research has been widely covered in the press. The press have also reported controversy relating to the origin of funding for COREISS, which notes in its disclosure statement that it is funded by the Foundation for a Smokefree World, a philanthropic organisation which receives funding from tobacco giant Philip Morris International.

In 2017, she was a finalist in the New Zealand Women of Influence Awards.

== Writing ==
Glover is also a published author of poetry and short stories.

Her 2014 co-edited book (with Paul Whitinui and Dan Hikuroa) Ara Mai he Tētēkura: Visioning our Futures was listed in Books of Mana as one of the 180 most significant works of Māori-authored non-fiction.

== Selected works ==
- Bullen, Chris, Hayden McRobbie, Simon Thornley, Marewa Glover, Ruey Lin, and M. Laugesen. "Effect of an electronic nicotine delivery device (e cigarette) on desire to smoke and withdrawal, user preferences and nicotine delivery: randomised cross-over trial." Tobacco control 19, no. 2 (2010): 98–103.
- Walker, Natalie, Colin Howe, Marewa Glover, Hayden McRobbie, Joanne Barnes, Vili Nosa, Varsha Parag, Bruce Bassett, and Christopher Bullen. "Cytisine versus nicotine for smoking cessation." New England Journal of Medicine 371, no. 25 (2014): 2353–2362.
- McRobbie, Hayden, Chris Bullen, Marewa Glover, Robyn Whittaker, Mark Wallace-Bell, and Trish Fraser. "New Zealand smoking cessation guidelines." The New Zealand Medical Journal (Online) 121, no. 1276 (2008).
- Laugesen, Murray, Michael Epton, Chris MA Frampton, Marewa Glover, and Rod A. Lea. "Hand-rolled cigarette smoking patterns compared with factory-made cigarette smoking in New Zealand men." BMC Public Health 9, no. 1 (2009): 194.
- Bullen, Chris, Colin Howe, Ruey‐Bin Lin, Michele Grigg, Murray Laugesen, Hayden McRobbie, Marewa Glover et al. "Pre‐cessation nicotine replacement therapy: pragmatic randomized trial." Addiction 105, no. 8 (2010): 1474–1483.

== Personal life ==
She is Māori, of Ngā Puhi descent.
