= Wellington Pride Festival =

Gay and Lesbian Fair

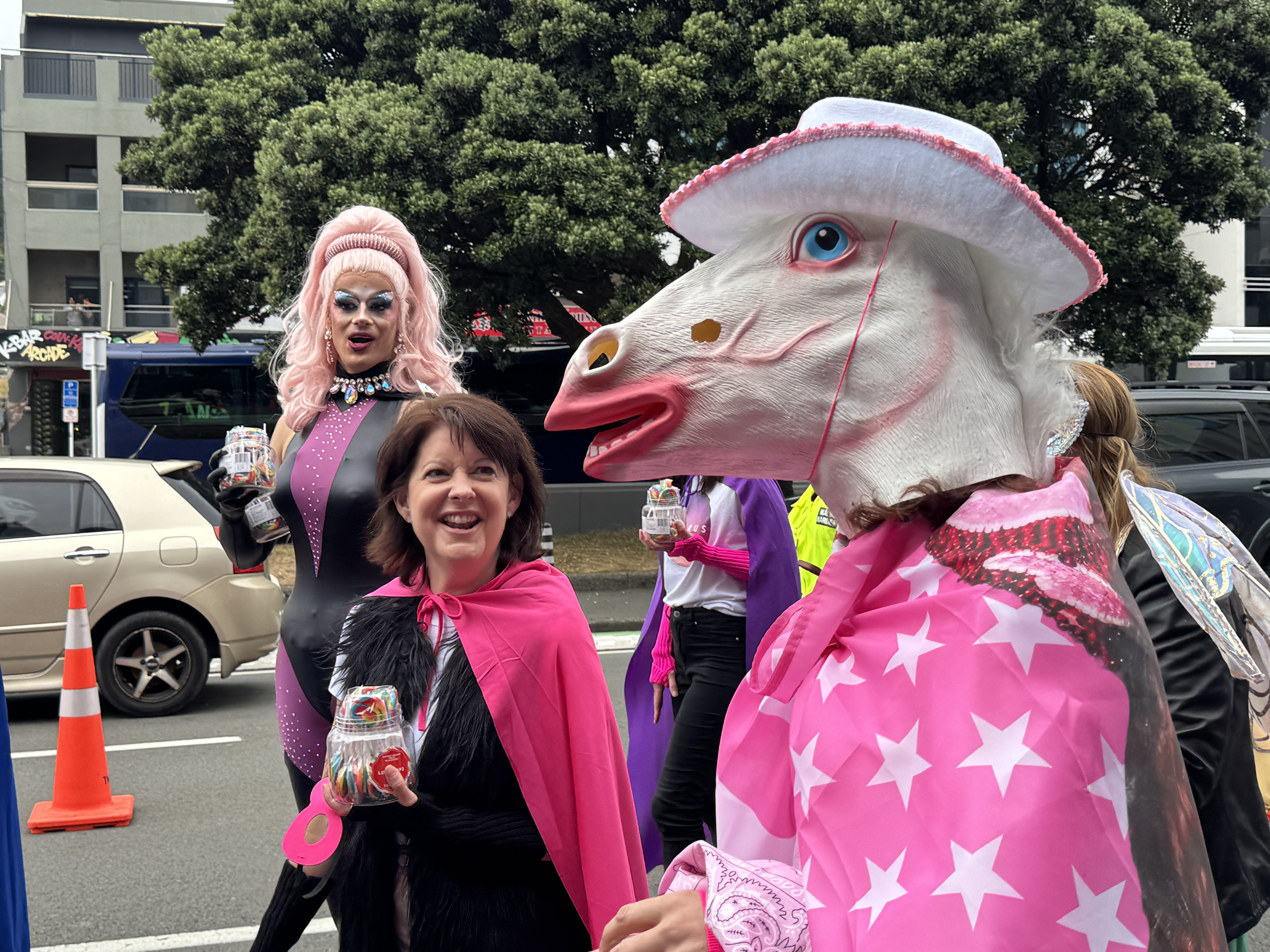
Wellington Pride Parade, March 2025

The Wellington Pride Festival is the yearly LGBT Pride celebration in Wellington, New Zealand. It includes the Out in the Square fair, which is the current incarnation of the annual Gay and Lesbian Fair that has been held each year in Wellington since 1986.

It was founded by local Wellington personality Des Smith, and its purpose originally was to assist such organisations as the Wellington Gay Task Force to do fundraising, and to raise visibility for the Law Reform cause.

The fair's original slogan was "A Fair for a Fair Law". Since most of the objectives of the Gay Task-force were achieved with the passing of the Homosexual Law Reform Act 1986 and with the enactment of the Human Rights Act in 1993 the purpose of holding the fair broadened out to assisting local community groups to raise funds for other local Gay & Lesbian causes such as, for example, the Lilac Library and the AIDS Foundation.

Since 2008 Out in the Square has been associated with a comparatively new LGBT pride festival called Proud, and is currently held in Wellington's Civic Square where it has extremely high visibility to all persons who walk through that area.

As an event, it has featured performances from members of the rainbow community and wider, the Iko Iko Handbag Hurl, and community groups' stalls selling various kinds of merchandise, food and wine, plants, etc. The fair is described by its organisers as a 'festive' day out for the whole community and is part of the Wellington City Council's Summer City Festival.

== History ==
The original fair ran for 22 years as the Wellington Gay And Lesbian Fair in the grounds of Newtown School in the suburb of Newtown, before changing focus and moving into the central city in 2008. The current organisers, Out Wellington Inc, are proud of this legacy. In 2010, marking the Fair's 25th anniversary, the Mayor of Wellington City, Kerry Prendergast, awarded the Fair's founder, Des Smith, the very first Pink Wellington Award or 'Pinkie' for his role in starting this tradition.

Out in the Square is a significant event for the gay and lesbian community in Wellington: some consider it to be one of the largest outdoor gay community events in New Zealand and one of the best events on Wellington's social calendar. Although the figures are disputed the event organisers claim that every year more than 8,000 people attend Out in the Square.
