= Journal of Child Sexual Abuse =

- Discipline: Sexology
- Language: English
- Edited by: Robert Geffner

Publication details
- History: 1992-
- Publisher: Routledge
- Frequency: Bimonthly
- Open access: yes
- Impact factor: 1.4 (2024)

Standard abbreviations
- ISO 4: J. Child Sex. Abuse

Indexing
- ISSN: 1053-8712 (print); 1547-0679 (web)

Journal of Child Sexual Abuse is an interdisciplinary, peer-reviewed, scholarly journal that provides an interface for researchers, academicians, attorneys, clinicians, and practitioners. The journal advocates for increased networking in the sexual abuse field, greater dissemination of information and research, a greater acknowledgment of child sexual abuse, and development of effective assessment, intervention, and prevention programs.

The Editor-in-Chief is Robert Geffner. He also edits the Journal of Aggression, Maltreatment, and Trauma and the Journal of Family Trauma, Child Custody, and Child Development and they are considered sister journals.
