= Mika X filmography =

New Zealand Maori actor, producer and music artist

Mika X (also known as Mika Haka) is a New Zealand Maori actor, producer, executive producer, and a music artist. Mika began his acting career in the 1980s in performing arts theatre before landing his first television role on Shark in the Park under his birth name Neil Gudsell. Mika had his first film role on The Rogue Stallion in his small role as Constable. Mika went on to producing and executive producing his on TV show including Mika Live and Te Mika Show. The largest short film him he has created was GURL which went on to win an award at the New Zealand International Film Festival.

== Film ==
Year	Film	Director	Executive producer	Producer	Actor	Role	Notes	Ref
1990	The Rogue Stallion	No	No	No	Yes	Constable	Credited as Neil Gudsell	
1993	The Piano	No	No	No	Yes	Tahu		

== Short film ==
Year	Film	Director	Executive producer	Producer	Actor	Role	Notes	Ref
1998	Ahi Ataahua	No	No	No	Yes	Performer	Choreography	
2009	ORCHIDS & ROSES	Yes	Yes	Yes	Yes			
2015	Taniwha	Yes	Yes	Yes	Yes			
2020	GURL	Yes	Yes	Yes	Yes	Carmen	Nominated Ngā Whanaunga Māori Pasifika Shorts Best Film Award; Won Ngā Whanaunga Māori Pasifika Shorts CineMāori Audience Award	

== Television ==
Year	Film	Director	Executive producer	Producer	Actor	Role	Notes	Ref
1989	Shark in the Park	No	No	No	Yes	Constable Ra	Credited as Neil Gudsell; Reoccurring character in season 1	
1989	Carmen	No	No	No	Yes	Young Carmen	Credited as Neil Gudsell; TV Special	
2000	Strassman	No	No	No	Yes	Guest		
2004	Mika Live	No	Yes	Yes	Yes	Self		
2006	Te Mika Show	No	Yes	Yes	Yes	Self	13 episodes	
2008	Shortland Street	No	No	No	Yes	Eva Destruction	2 episodes	
2010	Ka Life	No	Yes	Yes	Yes	Self - Presenter & Yoga instructor	15 episodes	
2011	Mika's Aroha Mardi Gras	No	Yes	Yes	Yes	Self	TV special	
2012	Auckland Daze	No	No	No	Yes	Mika	2 episodes	
2012	KA TV	No	Yes	Yes	Yes	Self		
2015	Matika	No	Yes	Yes	No		Episode 13	
2015 - 2017	The Aroha Project	No	Yes	Yes	No			
2016	2MI	Yes	Yes	Yes	Yes	Max Raurekareka		
2016	Te Reo Maori with Pa & Ti	No	Yes	Yes	Yes			
2017	Queens of Panguru	No	Yes	Yes	Yes	Self	Appeared in 2 episodes Produced all the episodes TV Mini Series	
2023	Lani Daniels vs Alrie Meleisea	No	No	No	Yes	Self - performing the New Zealand national anthem	The event was televised internationally in FITE and in New Zealand on Sky TV Sky Sports.	

== Documentary ==
Year	Film	Director	Executive producer	Producer	Actor	Role	Notes	Ref
1997	Witi Ihimaera	No	No	No	Yes	Subject		
2005	Making Music - Mika	No	No	No	Yes	Self		
2008	Mika Haka Kids	No	Yes	Yes	Yes	Self		

== Theatre ==
Year	Title	Role	Venue	Ref
2019	Natives Go Wild	Ngati Haua entertainer	Sydney Opera House	

== Music video ==
- "I Have Loved Me A Man", Mika Haka, (1990)
- "A.E.I.O.U.", Moana and the Moahunters (1991)
- "Lava Lover", Mika Haka, (1991)
- "Geraldine", Jan Hellriegel (1995)
- "Do U like What U See", Mika Haka, (1996)
- "Taniwha", Mika Haka, (1999)
- "My Angel", Mika Haka, (2000)
- "Ahi Ataahua", Mika Haka, (2001)
- "Wera Wera", Mika Haka, (2001)
- "Poti", Mika & Te Plastic Maori, (2007)
- "Taniwha Live", Mika Haka, (2011)
- "Dress To Express", Mika Haka ft. Hannah Martin & Zakk d'Larté, (2014)
- "Coffee", Mika Haka ft. Lavina Williams, (2014)
- "Loved Me A Man", Mika Haka ft. Lavina Williams, (2016)
