= Jay Tewake =

New Zealand Māori actor

- Born: 25 February 1990 (age 36); Papatoetoe, Auckland, New Zealand
- Notable work: GURL
- Family: Ramon Te Wake

Jay Tewake (born 25 February 1990 Papatoetoe, Auckland, New Zealand) is a New Zealand actor. He is best known for his work on the short film GURL and the reality TV mini series Queens of Panguru.

== Music ==
Tewake has also done notable work in Music with producing acts including Mika Haka, JGeek and the Geeks, Bare Feet Street and many more. In 2011, Jay Tewake performed at the 2011 Rugby World Cup Music Event Mika's Aroha Mardi Gras. It was televised on Māori Television. He performed He Hoi alongside his back up dancers GlamBoyz & Ka 400.

== Health ==
Tewake was featured on Māori Television multiple times in a TV series called KA TV and KA Life. The shows were family shows promoting Health, fitness, well-being with dance, healthy eating and exercise. The TV series went on to become a free school holiday program to teach kids to dance. They also did a couple of publicity stunts with flash mobs. They got to join the 2011 Rugby World Cup Music Event Mika's Aroha Mardi Gras and the 2011 Kiwi Day Out.

== The Queens of Panguru ==
In 2017, Jay Tewake starred in the reality TV Series The Queens of Panguru alongside Ramon Te Wake and Maihi Makiha. The five episode short series is about three well known people from the LGBT community who live in the big city of Auckland, return home to their roots. The TV series was televised on Māori Television.

== GURL ==
In 2020, Tewake starred the lead role in the short film GURL. The film was a prequel of the biopic "The Book of Carmen" which is currently in pre-production. The film is based on the life of Carmen Rupe. Tewake also sang on the film's soundtrack. Winner for Best Actor in Medium Length Film at Brazil International Film Festival.

== Personal life ==
On the show Queens of Panguru, Tewake describes himself as a "young gay glamboy". He is the descendant of Heremia Te Wake who was a notable tribe leader, who is the father of respected kuia (Māori elder), Dame Whina Cooper.

== Discography ==
=== Single ===
Year	Title	Album
2018	Higher (With Eli Globe & Richie Cattell)	Still Stuck
2020	What Kind of Coffee Do You Like? (With Jackie Clarke & Brady Peeti)	GURL

=== Albums ===
Year	Title	Details
2020	GURL	Released: 24 July 2020

== Filmography ==
=== Films ===
Year	Title	Role	Note
2020	GURL	GURL/Young Carmen	Nominated NZIFF Ngā Whanaunga Māori Pasifika Shorts Best Film Award; Won NZIFF Ngā Whanaunga Māori Pasifika Shorts CineMāori Audience Award

=== Documentary ===
Year	Title	Role	Note
2008	Mika Haka Kids	Self	

=== Television ===
Year	Title	Role	Note
2011	KA LIFE	Presenter	
2011	Mika's Aroha Mardi Gras	Performer	
2013	Ka TV	Presenter	
2017	Queens of Panguru	Self	5 Episodes

=== Music video ===
Year	Title	Artist	Role
2014	Coffee	Mika Haka feat Lavina Williams	Zombie
2020	What Kind of Coffee Do You Like	Featuring Brady Peeti, Jackie Clarke and Jay Tewake	Carmen

=== Accolades ===
Award	Date of ceremony	Category	Recipient(s)	Result	Ref(s)
NZIFF	August 2, 2020	Ngā Whanaunga Māori Pasifika Shorts Best Film Award	Mika X	Nominated	
NZIFF	August 2, 2020	Ngā Whanaunga Māori Pasifika Shorts CineMāori Audience Award	Mika X	Won	
Wairoa Māori Film Festival	October 25, 2020	Whenua Jury - Best Māori Director (Short Film)	Mika X	Won	
Calcutta International Cult Film Festival (FILMS OF THE MONTH – JAN-FEB 2021)	March 17, 2021	Best LGBT	Mika X	Won	
Calcutta International Cult Film Festival (FILMS OF THE MONTH – JAN-FEB 2021)	March 17, 2021	Outstanding Achievement Award	Mika X	Won	
Brazil International Monthly Film Festival	September 2021	Best Actor For Median Length Film	Jay Tewake	Won	
