= Amanaki Prescott-Faletau =

Tongan-New Zealand performer and director

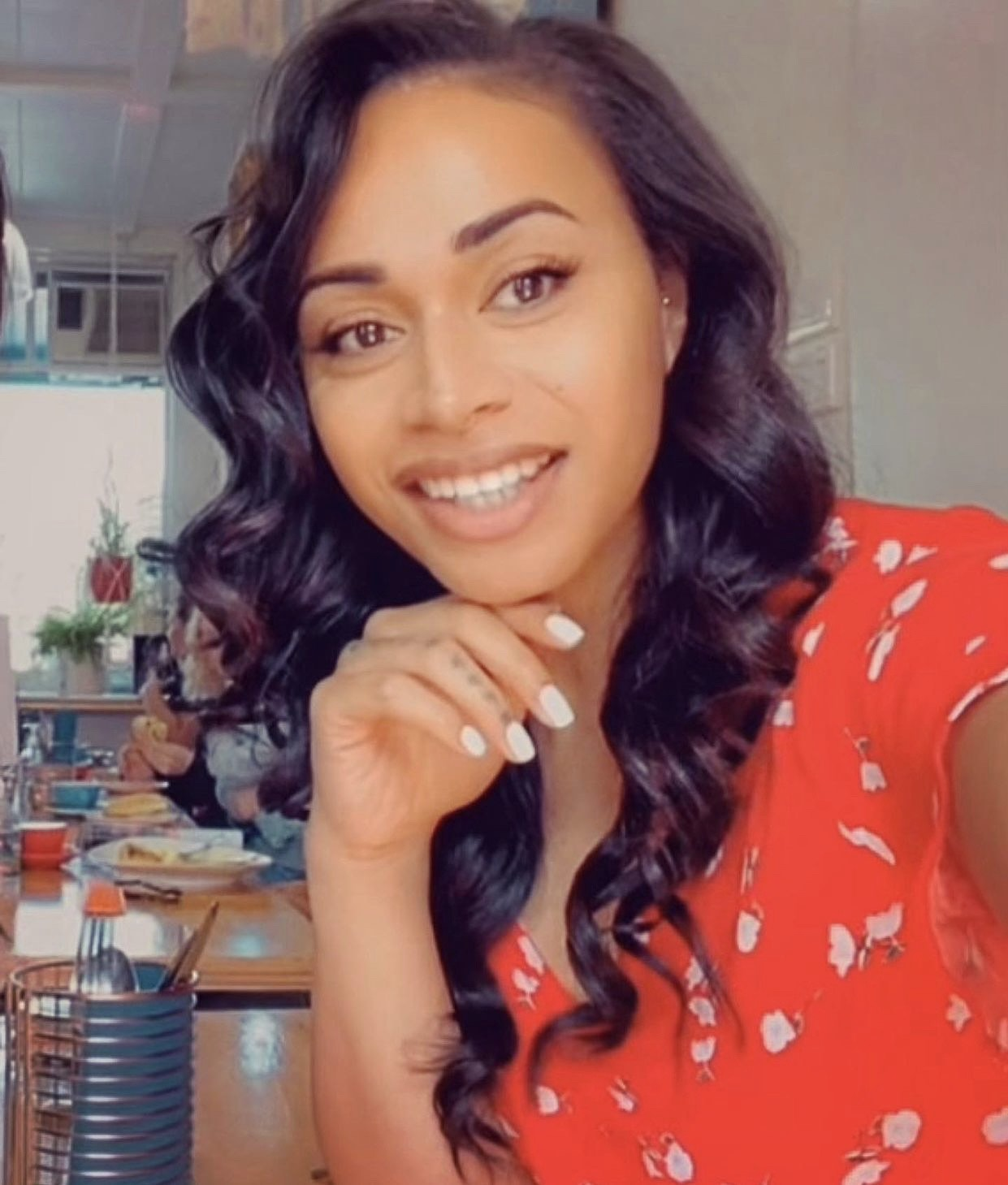
- Born: Amanaki Lelei Faletau-Prescott; Ōtāhuhu, Auckland, New Zealand
- Education: Pacific Institute of Performing Arts
- Known for: Acting, dancing and writing
- Movement: Hip-hop, vogue (dance), Siva Samoa, tau'olunga, ura (dance) and krumping
- Website: https://finepasifika.org.nz/

Amanaki Lelei Prescott-Faletau is an actor, writer, dancer, choreographer, producer and director of Tongan descent, living in New Zealand. As a playwright, she became the first fakaleitī to have her work published in New Zealand with Inky Pinky Ponky (co-written with Leki Jackson-Bourke). This play was awarded Best Teenage Script (2015) by New Zealand Playmarket. As an actor, she was awarded best performance at the 2015 Auckland Fringe Festival for Victor Rodger's Girl on the Corner. Her acting credits include The Breaker Upperers (2018), SIS (2020), The Panthers (2021), The Pact (2021) and Sui Generis (2022), in which she is also a writer for the TV series. Faletau competed as a dancer in the World Hip Hop Dance Championships in 2011 and has been a judge at the National Hip Hop Championships in New Zealand over several years.

== Early life ==
Faletau was born in New Zealand. Both of her parents are Tongan, from the villages Sopu and Vava'u. When her parents migrated to New Zealand in the 1980s, her mother worked as a tailor and her father worked as a mechanic. The family lived in Mount Roskill, Auckland, where she grew up as one of 13 siblings. Assigned male at birth, she knew from a young age that she identified as a girl. Growing up in a traditional religious Tongan family, she began performing and dancing at church events. From 2003 she attended Lynfield College and won the school's talent quest competition at the age of 15. From then on Faletau went on to compete in multiple national Hip Hop competitions in New Zealand and on two separate occasions had travelled to Los Angeles to compete in the World Hip Hop Dance Championships in 2008 and 2011.

== Biography ==
In 2007 Faletau studied a dance major/vocal minor at Excel School of Performing Arts, not completing her studies, Faletau began building her dance career in the dancing styles of Vogue, Krump, Locking, Popping, Waacking, Hip hop, eventuating in a culmination of the dance group Vogue, (with creative assistance and direction from Parris Goebel) where they competed at the World Hip Hop Dance Championships in 2011. Faletau went on to study at PIPA (Pacific Institute of Performing Arts), attaining her diploma and later completing her Bachelors in 2017 majoring in Performing arts. During her time at PIPA, Faletau learnt multiple Pacific heritage dance forms from a variety of Pacific Islands such as Siva Samoa (Samoa), Ura (Cook Islands), Tau'olunga (Tonga) and Takalo (Niue). Since then, Faletau has judged the National Hip Hop Championships in New Zealand for the past seven years and as a guest judge at multiple local high school talent quests.

In 2013 Faletau co-founded the performing arts collective Fine Fatale with frequent collaborator Mario Faumui, to provide a platform that highlights and amplifies the voices of Māori and Pasifika Trans and Queer artists and is the lead choreographer. Since its inception Fine Fatale have staged numerous multi-disciplinary live performances, merging Pacific heritage dance, street dance, singing, and cabaret. In February 2015, Fine Fatale debuted their work Freak Show, as part of the Auckland Pride Festival. Fine Fatale developed Freak Show and staged Le Freak at Māngere Arts Centre as part of the Urbanesia Festival in Auckland with Amanaki being acknowledged by multiple reviewers for her choreography and performance. Fine Fatale premiered a new work Geish/Tuiga welding contemporary movement with tradition Samoan dance for the 2018 Auckland Pride Festival. In 2019, Fine Fatale partnered with Auckland Live for their cabaret season with, The Heels are Alive, presented at the Wintergarden in Civic Theatre, Auckland. Following their Cabaret season, Fine Fatale were selected as Pavilions by Creative New Zealand to represent New Zealand in Hawai'i for the Festival of Pacific arts and culture in 2020. In 2021 Fine Fatale presented Fever:Return of the Ula, at the Civic, with Auckland Live. Following the completion of their cabaret season at Civic Theatre, the company will take Fever: Return of the Ula, on a nationwide tour in New Zealand with their successful Boosted x Moana crowdfunding campaign with Arts Foundation of New Zealand.

MVPFAFF is an acronym for Pacific indigenous identifying terms - Mahu (Hawai'i), Vakasalewalewa (Fiji), Palopa (Papua New Guinea), Fa'afafine (Samoa), Akava'ine (Cook Islands), Fakafifine (Niue), and Fakaleiti/leiti (Tonga). Faletau is an advocate for both MVPFAFF and LGBTQIA+ communities. As part of this advocacy, Faletau co-produced the first Pasifika Pride festival in New Zealand, providing a space for Pasifika people to celebrate their queerness in duality with their culture and religion. The Pasifika Pride festival is one of several projects and programmes delivered through the charitable trust that is F'INE Pasifika, founded by Nuiean human rights activist Phylesha Brown-Acton. One of these projects was the F.I.N.E. Festival at the Māngere Arts Centre in Auckland 2021.

As an actor Faletau has collaborated with Samoan and Nuiean actors, writers, directors and producers, Anapela Polataivao, Vela Manusaute, Robbie Magasiva and Victor Rodger. Her collaboration with Victor Rodger on the play Girl on the Corner, was awarded best performance in the Auckland Fringe awards (2015) and Club Paradiso staged at BATS Theatre in 2015 and 2019. She has also featured in a number of theatre and live performances directly tied to the issues that the MVPFAFF+ and LGBTQIA+ community continue to face, such as Music and Me (2012), Teen Faggots Come to Life (2014) and Fala Muncher (2018 and 2021). Faletau also featured as a choreographer with her work Fanau Tagata in the Matala Festival, the first Tongan arts festival in New Zealand.

As a writer Faletau's play Inky Pinky Ponky has been staged in numerous theatres in Auckland including the Basement Theatre at the 2015 Next Big Thing youth festival commissioned by Auckland Theatre Company and at Māngere Arts Centre and in local high school productions. Its latest development was part of the F.I.N.E. festival in 2021, featuring Amanaki as the character she wrote herself, Lisa. Inky Pinky Ponky was published in 2017 in an anthology named Talanoa: Four Pacific Plays, a compilation of four Pacific plays by a number of Pasifika New Zealand Playwrights. In 2021, this received funding from NZ on Air to be developed into a series for Māori Television.

Faletau has also won the Fresh Factor Pageant (2012), and modelled for New Zealand Samoan fashion designer Lindah Lepou.

Faletau was the principal choreographer for Auckland Theatre Company for multiple shows (2011–2013).

In 2016 Faletau spoke on a panel platforming women of influence and innovation in New Zealand, Extraordinary Tales of Strength & Daring.

Her inspirations are her parents, siblings, Michael Jackson, Janet Jackson, Jennifer Lopez, Beyoncé, Toni Braxton, Sālote Tupou III, Nafanua and Dame Whina Cooper.

== Awards ==
- 2012 - Fresh Factor Pageant
- 2015 - Auckland Fringe Awards - Best Performance - Girl on the Corner by Victor Rodger
- 2015 - New Zealand Playmarket - Best Teenage Script - Inky Pinky Ponky co-written Amanaki Faletau-Prescott & Leki Jackson Bourke
- 2022 - FAME Mid-Career Award (FAME Trust)

== Filmography ==
=== Films and short films ===
Year	Film	Role	Notes	Ref.
2018	The Breaker Upperers	Sepa's Crew	Feature Film	
2020	Gurl, directed, written and produced by Mika X	Mystik Ama	Short Film	
2023	Inky Pinky Ponky, directed by Damon Fepulea'i and Ramon Te Wake, (screened on MĀORI+2 and The Coconet)	writer, lead Lisa	Film on TV	

=== Television series ===
Year	Series	Role	Notes	Ref
2012	Both Worlds	Herself	Notable Pictures	
2015	Fresh TV	Multiple roles	The Coconet TV	
2020	SIS	Naki	Comedy Central	
2021	The Pact	Dia	TVNZ OnDemand	
2022	Sui Generis	Issa and writer (episode 1)	TVNZ OnDemand	
2022	Inky Pinky Ponky	Writer	TVNZ Pre-production	

=== Theatre ===
Year	Play	Role	Notes	Ref
2011	Polly Hood In Mumuland	Choreographer	Auckland Theatre Company, Dir. Tama Waipara	
2012	Music and Me	Deshanel	Dir. Asalemo Tofete	
2012	A Frigate Bird Sings	Shaniqua	Auckland Theatre Company, Dir. Alison Quigan	
2012	Fanau Tagata	Choreographer	Matala Festival	
2012	Checkout Chicks	Choreographer	ATC Dir. Simon Coleman and Jason Te Mete	
2014	Teen Faggots Come to Life	Actor/Herself	Basement Theatre	
2014	Miss Understood	Actor/Choreographer/Writer	Dir. Rachel House	
2015	Girl on the Corner	Shalimar Seiuli	FCC, Dir. Anapela Polataivao & Vela Manusaute	
2015	Freak Show	Choreographer/Performer	Fine Fatale, Dir. Mario Faumui	
2016	F' You	Choreographer/Performer	Fine Fatale, Auckland Pride Festival, Dir. Mario Faumui	
2015	Club Paradiso	Bubble	FCC, Dir. Vela Manusaute	
2015	LE FREAK	Choreographer/Performer	Fine Fatale, Dir. Mario Faumui	
2018	Geish/Tuiga	Choreographer/Performer	Fine Fatale, Dir Mario Faumui	
2018	Fala Muncher	Director	Dir. Amanaki Prescott-Faletau	
2019	Club Paradiso	Bubble	FCC, Dir. Vela Manusaute	
2021	Inky Pinky Ponky	Writer/Lisa	F.I.N.E. Festival	
2021	Fever	Choreographer/Performer	Fine Fatale, Dir. Mario Faumui	
2021	Fala Muncher	Director	Dir. Amanaki Prescott-Faletau	

== Selected publications ==
- 2017, Talanoa: Four Pacific Plays, (Inky Pinky Ponky) ISBN 9781877484346
