= Queens of Panguru =

New Zealand reality television mini series

- Genre: Reality; Documentary
- Created by: Mika X Ramon Te Wake
- Directed by: Mika X
- Starring: Jay Tewake; Ramon Te Wake; Maihi Makiha
- Narrated by: Mokoera Te Amo
- Music by: Mika Haka
- Country of origin: New Zealand
- Original languages: Māori; English
- No. of seasons: 1
- No. of episodes: 5

Production
- Executive producer: Mika X
- Producers: Nigel Snowden; Mika X Ramon Te Wake
- Production locations: Auckland, New Zealand; Panguru
- Editors: Lisa Holder; Rachel Eton; Ramon Te Wake; Shaun Dooley
- Production company: Patangaroa Entertainment Limited

Original release
- Network: Māori Television
- Release: 22 March – 19 April 2017

Queens of Panguru is a New Zealand reality television mini series that airs on Māori Television. The show focused on the personal lives of three cousins Jay Tewake, Ramon Te Wake and Maihi Makiha. They are from the LGBT community in Auckland, but they returned home to their small town of Panguru. Its premise originated with Mika X, who also served as an executive producer. The series debuted on March 22, 2017, with only five episodes in the series. All three drag queens are related through notable tribe leader Heremia Te Wake, who was the father of respected kuia (Māori elder), Dame Whina Cooper.

== The Queens ==
=== Jay Tewake ===
Jay Tewake (born 25 February 1990) is a New Zealand Māori actor, musician, model, film producer, entertainment manager and choreographer. He was well known at the time for his work with Mika Haka, Health TV series Ka TV & Ka Life and his performance at Mika's Aroha Mardi Gras in 2011.

=== Ramon Te wake ===
Ramon Te Wake (born 25 March 1976) is a New Zealand trans woman documentarian, singer-songwriter and television presenter. She is well known for her work in music with the release of her two albums The Arrival and Movement is Essential. She has appeared in multiple short films and television series including AROHA – K' Road Stories and Takataapui.

=== Maihi Makiha ===
Maihi Makiha is a well known New Zealand drag queen. They are also well known for their work at the New Zealand Aids Foundation as a Community Engagement Coordinator. They also performed at RWC Mika Aroha Mardi Gras in 2011 and has a regular spot on TV on the TVNZ show Whanau Living.

== Episodes ==
No.	Title	Original release date	N.Z. viewers (thousand)
1	"Episode 1"	22 March 2017	N/A
2	"Episode 2"	29 March 2017	N/A
3	"Episode 3"	5 April 2017	N/A
4	"Episode 4"	12 April 2017	N/A
5	"Episode 5"	19 April 2017	N/A
