= Greg Burgess (rugby union) =

- Born: Gregory Alexander John Burgess; 6 July 1954 (age 72) Auckland, New Zealand
- Height: 1.90 m (6 ft 3 in)
- Weight: 108 kg (238 lb)
- School: Marcellin College
- University: University of Otago
- Occupation: Real estate agent

Rugby union career
- Position: Prop
Senior career
Years	Team	Apps	(Points)
1970s	Ponsonby District Rugby Football Club		
Provincial / State sides
Years	Team	Apps	(Points)
- Auckland
International career
Years	Team	Apps	(Points)
1980–81	New Zealand	1	(0)

Gregory Alexander John Burgess (born 6 July 1954) is a former New Zealand rugby union player. A prop, Burgess represented Auckland at a provincial level, and was a member of the New Zealand national side, the All Blacks, in 1980 and 1981. He played two matches for the All Blacks, including one full international. He went on to win consecutive national powerlifting titles from 1985 to 1991, and was second in the shot put at the national track and field championships in 1984 and 1985.

Burgess became a successful investor, with interests in property and shares. In 2008 he appeared on the New Zealand National Business Review Rich List for the first time, with an estimated wealth of NZ$60 million.
