= Leki Jackson-Bourke =

Pasifika playwright

Leki Jackson-Bourke (born c. 1993) is a playwright based out of Auckland and is the first Pasifika playwright to win the Creative New Zealand Todd New Writer's Bursary Grant in 2018. In 2026, Bourke won the Performing Arts Network New Zealand's FAME Mid-Career Award.

== Early Life and Education ==
Jackson-Bourke is of Tongan-Niuean-Samoan ethnicity. In his youth, Jackson-Bourke attended Marcellin College. Jackson-Bourke then went to the Pacific Institute of Performing Arts and was pursuing a Bachelor in Pacific Performing Arts.

== Career ==
Jackson-Bourke co-authored the play Inky Pinky Ponky with Amanaki Prescott-Faletau in 2015 and the play was published in 2017 in Talanoa: Four Pacific Plays, an anthology of four Pacific plays by Pasifika New Zealand Playwrights. In 2021, NZ on Air gave funding to Tikilounge Productions to make Inky Pinky Ponky into a series for Māori Television.

In 2017, Jackson-Bourke won the Auckland Theatre Award for producing Maree Webster's Niuean parody Meet the Fakas where he was also named as one of the Outstanding Newcomers, along with Julie Zhu and Bronwyn Ensor. Meet the Fakas was awarded the Te Pou Theatre Award for Best Show Not Made by Pakeha (or Dirty D Word Award). In 2018, Jackson-Bourke was awarded the Emerging Pacific Artist Award and $5,000 for the 2018 Creative New Zealand Arts Pasifika Awards. In 2019, Jackson-Bourke was the first Victoria University Emerging Pasifika Writer in Residence Award. He wrote the play The Gangster's Paradise, which was selected as a joint winner in the teenage category for Playmarket New Zealand's 2019 Plays for the Young Competition along with Aroha Awarau's A Gaggle of Ducks . Jackson-Bourke was also interviewed by the Ministry for Pacific Peoples about his journey as an artist the influence Niuean culture has on his work for 2019's and 2021's Niue Language Week.

Jackson-Bourke did a placement at Q Theatre and Auckland Theatre Company through the TAUTAI Contemporary Pasifika Arts Pasifika internship programme. His most recent success was winning the 2024 Bruce Mason Playwright of The Year Award by Playmarket.

In 2026, Jackson-Bourke won the Performing Arts Network New Zealand's FAME Mid-Career Award and received a cash prize of NZ$20,000.

== Work ==
Year	Play	Role	Notes	Ref
2015	Inky Pinky Ponky (Theatre)	Co-author with Amanaki Prescott-Faletau,	Winner of the Plays for The Young Award (Teenage Category) by Playmarket NZ	
2017	Meet the Fakas (Theatre)	Producer/Director	Performed at the 2017 Auckland Theatre Awards Awards	
2018	Pring It On! (Theatre)	Author	Developed through the Todd New Writer's Bursary Grant, Creative New Zealand	
2019	The Gangster's Paradise (Theatre)	Author	Performed at the Auckland Theatre Company annual HERE & NOW youth theatre festival, winner of the Plays For The Young Competition.	
2022	Inky Pinky Ponky (Film)	Co-Writer with Amanaki Prescott-Faletau,	Produced by Tikilounge Productions	
2024	Red, White & Brass - The Play	Writer	Stage Adaptation by Leki Jackson-Bourke, Produced by Auckland Theatre Company / Miss Piki Films	
