= Marcellin College, Auckland =

Catholic school in New Zealand

Marcellin College

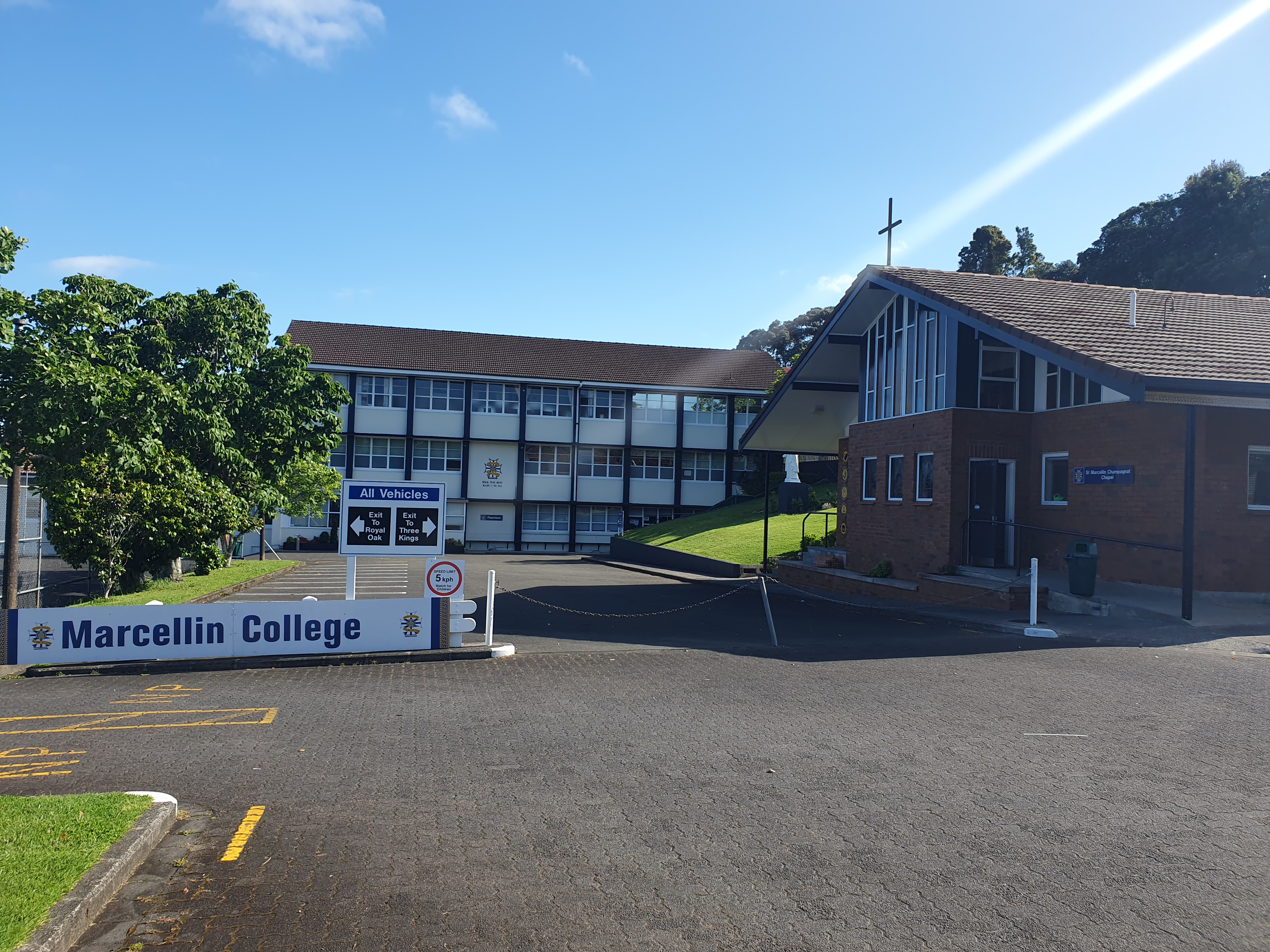

Location
- 617 Mt Albert Road, Royal Oak, Auckland, New Zealand; 36.9108°S 174.7665°E

Information
- Type: Integrated secondary (year 7–13) Roman Catholic Co-Ed
- Motto: Optima Quaere (Seek The Best)
- Established: 1958; 68 years ago (St Benedict's College founded 1884)
- Ministry of Education Institution no.: 63
- Principal: Rosanna Fouhy
- Enrolment: 466 (July 2026)
- Socio-economic decile: 2F
- Website: www.marcellin.school.nz

Marcellin College is a Catholic, integrated, co-educational college in Royal Oak, Auckland, New Zealand for students in Year 7 to Year 13. The college was founded by the Marist Brothers in 1958 as a school for boys only. The school follows the values of Marist education, which was formed by the name of the school and patron saint, St Marcellin Champagnat. The school is located on grounds which had been part of the Pah estate. It has an extensive woodland on its southern and western boundaries. Most of the former Pah estate contiguous with Marcellin College is now owned by the Auckland Council and is maintained as a park known as "Monte Cecilia Park." The Auckland Franciscan Friary and Retreat Centre is just across Monte Cecilia Park from the college. A Discalced Carmelite Monastery (under the patronage of the Holy Family and St Thomas, Apostle) is directly opposite the college on Mt Albert Rd. The school became co-educational in 1981 when it amalgamated with St Benedict's College, a girls' school.

== History ==
=== Origins ===
The college was established in 1958, for boys, by the Marist Brothers as a normal school for the training of Brothers as teachers in intermediate classes. Until 1958 the site of the college had been occupied by the Marist Brothers scholasticate. From the scholasticate, which was established in 1943, the young teachers had to travel to the Marist school in Vermont St, Ponsonby. This was expensive and inconvenient. In 1957 the scholasticate was removed to new buildings erected on land (called Monte Cecelia) purchased from the Sisters of Mercy behind and adjacent to the college site. A new building called Marcellin Hall was built for the training of Marist Brothers. This opened in 1961. In 1979 Marcellin Hall became a Pastoral Centre for personal renewal, theological reflection and apostolic effectiveness with residential courses, seminars and retreats there conducted by a community of nuns, priests and brothers. Some parts of this building are included in the present school.

=== Early days ===
The first building of the school was a block of four classrooms and when the college commenced in 1958 it had only two year levels, years 7 and 8 – then called Forms 1 and 2. The staff of the scholasticate acted as the teachers until the College was staffed independently. The College was soon operating as a full secondary school. The need to devote resources to the new school considerably stretched the Marist Brothers and they had to reduce staff or increase class sizes at some other schools.

=== Co-education and integration ===
In 1982 the proprietor of Marcellin College signed an integration agreement with the Minister of Education and the college entered the State education system as a State-integrated school. However, it entered the state system as a co-educational secondary school because in 1981 the school had incorporated a secondary school for girls, St Benedict's College, Newton, which closed in that year.

== St Benedict's College ==
St Benedict's College had its origins in 1884 when the Sisters of St Joseph of the Sacred Heart, at the behest of their founder, Mary MacKillop (St Mary of the Cross), arrived in Auckland from Adelaide and opened their first school in a converted shop in Karangahape Road. They founded St Benedict's College (secondary) and St Benedict's School (primary) near St Benedict's Church, Newton in 1886, and in 1898 a large new school was built on the opposite corner from the church. From the early 1970s, population drift coinciding with, and to some extent due to, the construction of the nearby Auckland motorway system, led to a dramatic fall off in pupils. The secondary college merged with Marcellin College in 1981, and the primary school closed. The writer Ruth Park, who attended St Benedict's in the 1930s and finished her years there as Head Girl, wrote lovingly of her school years with the sisters. "St Benedict's, unfunded, unheated, elderly and shabby, how much I owe you!" The memory of St Benedict's College is treasured as an important part of the tradition of Marcellin College.

== Ethos ==
In 2022, "Marcellin College has seen strong roll growth and rapidly growing popularity". The college has a diverse, multicultural roll. In 2014, the school's gender composition was Male 56% and Female 44% and its ethnic composition was Māori 7%, NZ European/Pakeha 8%, Pacifica 58%. Asian 24% and other 3%. There were four international students. Academically, the school offers for senior years the National Certificate of Educational Achievement assessment system (NCEA).

== Principals ==
- Jan Waelan (2015–2019)
- Dean Wearmouth (2019–2022)
- Maria Prescott (2022–2025)
- Alisha Hunt (2025) (acting)
- Kieran Fouhy (Term 1-Term 2 2026) (acting)
- Rosanna Fouhy (2026-present)

== Notable alumni ==
This is a list of notable former students of Marcellin College, Auckland and St Benedict's College, Newton, which amalgamated with Marcellin College in 1981.

- Roy Asotasi (1982–), New Zealand rugby league representative
- Casey Costello (born 1965), Politician, list MP for the New Zealand First Party and cabinet minister (2023–present)
- Alaisalatemaota Bakulich-Leavasa (born 1979), rugby union player; Samoa’s most-capped women’s rugby player.
- Monty Betham (1978–), New Zealand rugby league representative and professional boxer
- Greg Burgess (born 1954), representative national New Zealand rugby union player, All Blacks prop (1980 and 1980)
- Mark Hotchin (1958–), businessman, director of Hanover Finance
- Leki Jackson-Bourke (1993–), Playwright.
- Neru Leavasa, New Zealand politician, Labour Party Member of Parliament for Takanini (2020 to 2023).
- Chris Lewis (1957–), tennis professional, men's finalist at the 1983 Wimbledon Championships.
- Adrienne Lili'i (born 1970), former New Zealand rugby union player.
- Dylan Mika (1972–2018), former rugby union player; New Zealand All Black and Samoa representative.
- Ronaldo Mulitalo (1999–), professional rugby league player, representative of Samoa national rugby league team and current Cronulla Sharks player
- Johnny Ngauamo (1969–), rugby union player, Auckland Blues (Super Rugby) and Tonga representative
- Ruth Park (1917–2010), writer (St Benedict's)
- Joseph Parker (1992–), professional boxer, competed at the 2010 Commonwealth Games; World Boxing Organization (WBO) heavyweight champion (2016–2018)
- Freda Stark (1910–1999), dancer (St Benedict's)
- Fetuʻu Vainikolo (1985–), professional rugby union player, representative of Tonga

== Sources ==
- Pat Gallager, The Marist Brothers in New Zealand Fiji & Samoa 1876-1976, New Zealand Marist Brothers' Trust Board, Tuakau, 1976.
- St. Benedict’s College : corner East St. & St. Benedicts St., Newton, Auckland, New Zealand or Souvenir magazine St. Benedict’s College, 1980, The College, Auckland, 1980.
- Nicholas Reid, James Michael Liston: A Life, Victoria University Press, Wellington, 2006.
- Strevens, Diane (2008). MacKillop Women: The Sisters of St. Joseph of the Sacred Heart, Aotearoa New Zealand : 1883-2006. David Ling Pub. ISBN 978-1-877378-23-2.
