= Mika's Aroha Mardi Gras =

- Free concert by Mika Haka
- Venue: Takutai Square, Auckland CBD, New Zealand
- Date(s): 23 September 2011
- No. of shows: 2
- Attendance: 15,000
- Website: https://www.mikahaka.com/

Mika Haka concert chronology
- Mika and the APO - Pō A Tribal Pop Opera; Mika's Aroha Mardi Gras; Salon Mika

Mika's Aroha Mardi Gras was a 2011 concert show by Mika Haka. It was staged in Takutai Square, Auckland CBD, New Zealand on September 23 with two shows on the same day. The show was part of the New Zealand series of entertainment events that was put on for the 2011 Rugby World Cup. In mid October, Māori Television aired the concerts as a one-hour special. The show was edited from footage of the second performance of the evening.

The shows were a free non ticketed event available to the public. Combining both 6 pm and 8 pm shows, a total of 15,000 attended the event. The show had over 680 people participating in the event, including 400 kids as part of the KA 400. The event was choreographed by Jay Tewake.

Rena Owen was the presenter of the Televised special, presenting the show as a story teller. Mika also performed alongside Jay Tewake, Edward Ru of Sweet & Irie, Keisha Castle-Hughes, Erakah and more.

== Maori TV Setlist ==
Performer(s)	Song
Te Tai Tonga Kapa Haka	Haka
Rena Owens	Welcoming to the show
Taiko Drummers	Drumming
Rena Owens	Introducing Mika
Mika	Taniwha
Mika featuring Taiko Drummers	Hawaiki Nui
Rena Owens	Story Telling
Mika featuring Jay Tewake, Erakah, Ka 400 kids	Wera Wera (Aroha Mardi Gras Remix)
Mika featuring Ka 400 kids and Te Tai Tonga Kapa Haka	Aotearoa
Rena Owens	Introducing the Drag Queens
Mika featuring Erakah	Spoof (Get It On remix)
Mika featuring Edward Ru	Lava Lover (Reggaie remix)
Mika	Caged Animals (Karl Moser remix)
Jay Tewake featuring Glam Boys and Ka 400	He Hoi
Rena Owens	Thank you and farewell
Mika featuring the full cast	Friend

== Concert dates ==
Date	Start Time	City	Country	Venue
September 23, 2011	6 pm	Auckland CBD	New Zealand	Takutai Square
September 23, 2011	8 pm	Auckland CBD	New Zealand	Takutai Square

== Personnel ==
Lead performer

- Vocals, dance and choreographer: Mika Haka

Additional performers

- Vocals: Jay Tewake, Edward Ru, Keisha Castle-Hughes, Erakah and more.

Music department

- Musical director: Karl Moser

Choreographer

- Choreographer and dancer: Jay Tewake

== Revised events ==
=== 2014 Legend Bar ===
Mika's Aroha Mardi Gras
- Promotional concert by Mika Haka
- Venue: Legend Bar, Karangahape Road, Auckland CBD, New Zealand
- Date(s): 6 February 2014
- No. of shows: 1
- Website: https://www.mikahaka.com/

In 2014, Mika Haka recreated his Mika's Aroha Mardi Gras as part of the New Zealand Auckland Pride Festival. This time it was a smaller event held in a bar called Legend Gay Bar. The event was held on the 6 February 2014 Waitangi Day. The aim of the event was not only to shine a light on upcoming New Zealand talent but to also release his single Dress To Express featuring Zakk d’Larté and Hannah Martin.

==== Set List ====
Performer(s)	Song
Te Tai Tonga Kapa Haka	Haka
Mika	Skyfall
Taki Maori	
Host Mika	
Mc’s Yaya, Hannah Martin	
Break	
Richie Cattell	
Laurent Dunningham	
Vee	
Mika	In the morning
Break	
Lilly Loca’s Burlesque Saloon	
Siche	
the O’neill Twins, Brooke & Starce	
Mattie Hamuera	All of Me
Hannah & Yaya	
Break	
Teen Faggots	Come to Life
Mika	
Zakk D’larté	
Break	
Yaya	
Richie Cattell	
Lilly Loca’s Burlesque Saloon	
Racheal Timoti-avega	
Vee	
Mika Ft.zakk D’larté & Hannah Martin	Dress To Express

=== The Red Light District ===
Mika's Aroha Mardi Gras: The Red Light District
- Free concert by Mika Haka
- Venue: Karangahape Road, Auckland CBD, New Zealand
- Date(s): 1 May 2016
- No. of shows: 1
- Website: https://www.mikahaka.com/

In 2016, Mika once again recreated Aroha Mardi Gras. The event was held on Karangahape Road in Auckland CBD outside the infamous Auckland Gay bar Family. The event was held between 12pm and went on till 7 pm, which is a similar schedule to the Big Gay Out. The event was free to the public. This was the first time in 20 year that Karangahape Road has closed down for an event. Parts of the event was filmed for the reality TV series Queens of Panguru where Ramon Te Wake, Jay Tewake, and Maihi Makiha all performed.

==== Set List ====
Performer(s)	Song
Queens of Panguru (Ramon Te Wake, Jay Tewake, and Maihi Makiha)	Welcoming to the street
Ahakoa Te Aha He Tangata	Kapa Haka
Break	
Street Talk and King Homeboy	
Kimiora Williams-Hart	
Cast of 2MI Webseries Hosted by TZE	
Ben Hammond & Illegal Dance Crew	
Vicki Martin	
Break	
Chainey Nathan	
Mokoera & Te Amo	Acoustic Set
Struck on 24/7	
Mika and Queens of Panguru	
Break	
Christopher Olwage	
Break	
Mika	
