= Alaisalatemaota Bakulich-Leavasa =

Samoa international rugby union player

Ala Bakulich-Leavasa
- Born: 9 October 1979 (age 47) Samoa
- Height: 1.64 m (5 ft 5 in)

Rugby union career
- Position(s): Prop, hooker
Amateur team(s)
Years	Team	Apps	(Points)
	Marist		(0)
	Ponsonby		(0)
Provincial / State sides
Years	Team	Apps	(Points)
2007–2011, 2014	Auckland	26	(0)
2013, 2015	Counties Manukau	9	(0)
International career
Years	Team	Apps	(Points)
2001–2016	Samoa	17	(0)
2003	World XV	3	(0)

Alaisalatemaota Bakulich-Leavasa (born 9 October 1979) is a former Samoan rugby union player. She is Samoa's most-capped women's rugby player. She competed for Samoa at the 2002, 2006 and 2014 Rugby World Cups.

== Biography ==
Bakulich-Leavasa was born in Samoa and is the oldest of five children. Her parents migrated to New Zealand in the early 80s. Her mother is from Le'auva'a and Solosolo in Samoa, while her father is from Vaiala and Vaimoso.

=== Rugby career ===
Bakulich-Leavasa began playing rugby in Year 10 while attending Marcellin College. She graduated from Epsom Girls' Grammar School, the year they formed their first rugby team. She has made over 50 appearances for three different teams in New Zealand's domestic rugby competition since the early 2000s.

Bakulich-Leavasa has featured in three Rugby World Cups for Samoa, in 2002, 2006 and 2014. In 2003 she played for the World XV's team against the Black Ferns. She, along with friends and family, helped create the Maui Tamaki Makaurau women's under 21 team.

Bakulich-Leavasa studied Physiotherapy and graduated in 2017. She is currently a physiotherapist for the Manu Sina team.
