= GURL =

- Film poster
- Directed by: Mika X
- Written by: Mika X
- Produced by: Mika X Georgina Allison Conder; Philippa Campbell
- Starring: Jay Tewake; Brady Peeti; Jackie Clarke; Regan Taylor; Aaron Ward
- Cinematography: Darryl Ward
- Edited by: Anastasia Doniants
- Music by: Mika Haka
- Production company: Mika Haka Foundation
- Distributed by: Independent
- Release date: 26 July 2020 (New Zealand International Film Festival)
- Running time: 20 minutes
- Country: New Zealand
- Language: English
- Budget: $380,000

GURL is a 2020 New Zealand short film directed, written and produced by Mika X. The film premiered at the New Zealand International Film Festival as part of the "Ngā Whanaunga Māori Pasifika Shorts 2020" selection curated by Leo Koziol and Craig Fasi. GURL tells a story of Carmen Rupe experience in the context of being both Maori and LGBT: "The infamous Māori Drag Queen Carmen 'Gurl' finally accepts her-true-self when she falls in love with a fading rugby star on an ill-fated night in New Zealand 1975." This short film is a prequel to the feature film "The Book of Carmen" which has been in pre-production since the release of GURL.

== Plot ==
GURL is about night of the life of Carmen Rupe. While she is working the streets in the evening of K road, Carmen lives in a fantasy as a younger transgender woman "Gurl", working as a sex worker, waiting for her White Knight to take her away. When the white knight isn't what he makes out to be, Gurl escapes a violent. While she collects herself, an unexpected person comes to her aid, A dying All Black. The two spend an evening together as they fall in love.

== Cast ==
- Jay Tewake as Gurl / Young Carmen
- Jackie Clarke as Sapphire
- Brady Peeti as Gypsy
- Regan Taylor as Ed
- Aaron Ward as White Knight
- Mika X as Carmen
- Rosanna Raymond as Mystik Maiden
- Ramon Te Wake as Mystik Ra
- Amanaki Prescott as Mystik Ama
- Amanduh La Hoare as Lofty Queen
- Danielle Hayes as Terracotta Blade
- Whetu Fala as Whaea
- Richie Cattell as Rugby Lad

== Credits ==
Director

- Directed and Written by: Mika X

Producers

- Executive Producer: Mika X
- Consulting Producer: Georgina Allison Conder
- Consulting Producer: Philippa Campbell
- Line Producer: Lance Loughlin
- Associate Producer: Alex Plumb

Music department

- Music Composers: Mark Dennison
- Music Composers: Penny Dodd
- Music Producer and Mastered by: Alan Jansson
- Music Manager: Benjamin Thomas Watt

Design

- Production Design: Shaun Dooley

Sound Department

- Sound Recordists: Tipene Rogers
- Sound Recordists: Mark Storie

Editing

- Editor: Anastasia Doniants
- Editing Studio: Department of post

== Releases ==
The film premiered at the New Zealand International Film Festival at ASB Waterfront Theatre on 26 July 2020. The film was also available to watch online until 2 August. The film was screened in the first weekend of August at Rialto Cinema Tauranga, Monterey Howick Cinemas in Auckland, Regent cinema in Dunedin, Len Lye Centre in New Plymouth and Roxy Cinema in Wellington.

== Soundtrack ==
=== Single ===
"What Kind Of Coffee Do You Like?"

Single by Jay Te Wake, Jackie Clarke & Brady Peeti

from the album GURL Original Short Film Soundtrack
- Released: 17 July 2020
- Recorded: 2019–2020
- Studio: Uptown Studio
- Genre: Soundtrack Musical
- Length: 2:26
- Label: Patangaroa Entertainment Ltd
- Composers: Penny Dodd and Mark Dennison
- Lyricist: Mika Haka
- Producer: Alan Jansson

GURL Original Short Film Soundtrack track listing
- 12 What Kind of Coffe Do You Like?

==== Track listing ====
Digital download

1. "What Kind Of Coffee Do You Like?" – 2:26

=== Album ===
GURL Original Short Film Soundtrack

Soundtrack album by Mika Haka & The cast of GURL
- Released: 24 July 2020
- Recorded: 2019–2020
- Studio: Uptown Studios
- Genre: Soundtrack Musical
- Length: 46:37
- Label: Patangaroa Entertainment Ltd
- Producer: Alan Jansson

All tracks are written by Mika Haka.

No.	Title	Lyrics	Music	Artist	Length
1.	"I Te Wa"	Mika Haka	Penny Dodd and Mark Dennison	Brady Peeti & The cast	1:29
2.	"The Lonely All Black"	Mika Haka	Penny Dodd and Mark Dennison	Regan Taylor	1:28
3.	"MELANCOLY"		Penny Dodd and Mark Dennison		1:35
4.	"Mirror Mirror on the wall"	Mika Haka	Penny Dodd and Mark Dennison	Jackie Clarke & Gail Tipene	4:59
5.	"Room 1334"	Mika Haka	Penny Dodd and Mark Dennison	Rosanna Raymond feat. Jackie Clarke & Gail Tipene	4:14
6.	"Himi Hendrix"		Penny Dodd and Mark Dennison	Neil Watson	1:00
7.	"Eggs, Baked Beans, Rainbow"	Mika Haka	Penny Dodd and Mark Dennison	Frankie Stevens feat. Jackie Clarke & Gail Tipene	0:47
8.	"Shake it up baby"	Mika Haka	Penny Dodd and Mark Dennison	Gail Tipene	4:03
9.	"Mambo Fantasy"	Mika Haka	Penny Dodd and Mark Dennison	Mika Haka	1:24
10.	"Hawaiian Love Duet"	Mika Haka	Penny Dodd and Mark Dennison	Jay Te Wake & Regan Taylor	0:38
11.	"In The Morning"		Penny Dodd and Mark Dennison		0:49
12.	"What Kind of Coffe Do You Like?"	Mika Haka	Penny Dodd and Mark Dennison	Jay Te Wake, Jackie Clarke & Brady Peeti feat. The Cast	2:26
13.	"I Ta Wa (Instrumental)"		Penny Dodd and Mark Dennison		1:29
14.	"The Lonely All Black (Instrumental)"		Penny Dodd and Mark Dennison		1:28
15.	"Mirror Mirror on the Wall (Instrumental)"		Penny Dodd and Mark Dennison		4:59
16.	"Room 1334 (Instrumental)"		Penny Dodd and Mark Dennison		4:13
17.	"Eggs, Baked Beans, Rainbow (Instrumental)"		Penny Dodd and Mark Dennison		0:48
18.	"Shake it up baby (Instrumental)"		Penny Dodd and Mark Dennison		4:04
19.	"Mambo Fantasy"	Mika Haka	Penny Dodd and Mark Dennison	Jackie Clarke	1:29
20.	"Hawaiian Love Duet (Instrumental)"		Penny Dodd and Mark Dennison		0:37
21.	"What Kind Of Coffee Do You Like? (Instrumental)"		Penny Dodd and Mark Dennison		2:26

== Reception ==
=== Accolades ===
Award	Date of ceremony	Category	Recipient(s)	Result	Ref.
NZIFF	2 August 2020	Ngā Whanaunga Māori Pasifika Shorts Best Film Award	Mika X	Nominated	
NZIFF	2 August 2020	Ngā Whanaunga Māori Pasifika Shorts CineMāori Audience Award	Mika X	Won	
Wairoa Māori Film Festival	25 October 2020	Whenua Jury - Best Māori Director (Short Film)	Mika X	Won	
Calcutta International Cult Film Festival (Films of the Month – Jan-Feb 2021)	17 March 2021	Best LGBT	Mika X	Won	
Calcutta International Cult Film Festival (Films of the Month – Jan-Feb 2021)	17 March 2021	Outstanding Achievement Award	Mika X	Won	
Brazil International Monthly Film Festival	September 2021	Best Actor For Median Length Film	Jay Tewake	Won	
California Indies Film and Script Awards	January 2022	Best LGBTQ Film	Mika X	Won	
