= Ramon Te Wake =

New Zealand trans woman documentarian, singer-songwriter and television presenter

- Born: 26 March 1976 (age 49); Dargaville, New Zealand
- Occupations: Singer; tv presenter; reality tv star; model; filmmaker
- Family: Jay Tewake

Ramon Te Wake (born 25 March 1976) is a New Zealand trans woman documentarian, singer-songwriter and television presenter. Her first presenting job was for Māori Television, where she was one of three people fronting Takatāpui, which is Maori Television's first ever LGBT show.

== Early life ==
Te Wake was born in Dargaville to Māori parents Ray and Tilly Te Wake. She is the decentdant of Heremia Te Wake who was a notable tribe leader, who is the father of respected kuia (Māori elder), Dame Whina Cooper. She grew up in Ascot Park, a suburb in Porirua. She moved to Wellington in the early 1990s, and then to Auckland shortly after.

== Music ==
She released her debut EP, The Arrival in 2002 and toured New Zealand in R&B / Funk band Pure Funk during 1995 and 1996. In June 2005 she received a grant of up to $15,000 to record a new CD from Te Waka Toi, the Màori arts board of Creative New Zealand. Her second album, Movement is Essential, came out in 2008. In 2008 Ramon started a DJ residency at Kiss bar called "Delicious Thursdays." She is also a well known model and "the first transgender girl to appear in music video clips and a Coca-Cola commercial." In 2005 Te Wake joined King Kapisi in presenting Pasifika 2005 festival, the biggest Polynesian culture festival in the world held in Auckland every year since 1992, it was televised on TV2.

== TV ==
Her first presenting job was for Māori Television, where she was one of three people fronting Takatāpui, which is Maori Television's first ever LGBT show. The show began in 2004 and still continues today. Ramon's storytelling was noted by Scoop Independent News as "strong, creative and visual." Ramon's most celebrated work from the programme was the coverage of the 2011 death of activist Carmen Rupe. She had made a documentary of Rupe's life in 2006. In 2008 she was one of several actors selected to portray Georgina Beyer, a trans woman who became the world's first openly transsexual mayor, as well as the world's first openly transsexual Member of Parliament, in a feature-length film. In 2009 The Making of Ramon was a Takatāpui-produced documentary about Ramon which was aired as part of Triangle TV's Sunday Nights Out. In 2011 Te Wake directed a 25-minute video "Pacific Voices" for the NZ AIDS Foundation addressing issues and lives of Pacific LGBT people "such as identity, sexual health, bullying and family estrangement" the project "offers hope through mutual support and self-determination." She has co-directed two series with Damon Fepulia'i, Inky Pinky Ponky (2023) and most recently The Boy, The Queen, and Everything in Between (2024), credited also as the Writer.

== Discography ==
=== Albums ===
- The Arrival (2002)
- Movement is Essential (2008)

=== Music videos ===
- To The Core (2007)
- Still Remains (2010)

== Filmography ==
=== Feature films ===
- Rūrangi

=== Short films ===
- The Preacher Man (2004)
- The Johnny Doo Good Show (2005)
- AROHA – K' Road Stories (2015)
- GURL (2020)
- Wait, Wait, Now! (2024)

=== TV ===
- Takataapui (2005)
- Neighbourhood (2016)
- Queens of Panguru (2017)
- Inky Pinky Ponky (2023) written by Amanaki Prescott-Faletau, co-directed by Damon Fepulea’i
- The Boy, The Queen, and Everything in Between (2024) Written by Ramon Te Wake, co-directed by Damon Fepulia'i

=== Theatre ===
- People Like Us (2016)

== See also ==
- List of New Zealand television personalities
