= Robert Pollock (actor) =

New Zealand actor

- Born: Robert Pollock; 1960 (age 65–66); New Zealand
- Occupation: Actor/Teacher
- Years active: 1988 – present

Robert Pollock (born 1960) is a New Zealand actor.

== Life ==
Pollock graduated from Toi Whakaari: New Zealand Drama School in 1986 with a Diploma in Acting.

== Filmography ==
=== Film ===
- Beyond Gravity (1988)
- Once Were Warriors (1994) – Policeman
- The Lord of the Rings: The Return of the King – Orc Sergeant (Extended Edition only)

=== Television ===
- Shark in the Park (1990) – Dingo
- Shortland Street (1992/1999-2000) – Dennis Cracknell/Rex Yates
- Riding High (1995)
- Hercules: The Legendary Journeys (1995) – Minos
- City Life (1996/1997) – Marcus
- Love Mussel (2001) – Roger Davies
- Ike: Countdown to D-Day (2004) – 101st Airborne sergeant
- Power Rangers S.P.D (2005) – Vine Monster
- Orange Roughies (2006) – Roger Steele
