= Dana de Milo =

- Dana de Milo
- Born: Auckland, New Zealand
- Died: 12 February 2018 (aged 71)
- Known for: LGBTQ+ Activism

Dana de Milo was an activist and outspoken community member from New Zealand. She engaged with issues faced by the queer community, and transgender people in particular. She was a transgender woman herself.

== Life ==
de Milo was born in Auckland, New Zealand on 29 August 1946.

From a young age, she was often punished for wearing items of clothing belonging to her mother. She also faced bullying at school and noted in interviews that this had a detrimental effect on her learning. de Milo left school at 12 years old and became a French Polishing apprentice.

de Milo's father suffered from Hodgkin Lymphoma and was unwell for much of her childhood. He died while she was still a child.

In 1960, when de Milo was 13 years old, she ran away from home. In later interviews, she stated that this was due to the fact that she faced punishment at home for presenting as female. She briefly worked on a ship, before moving to Wellington in 1963.

de Milo reconnected with her mother at age 21, informing her that she was living as a woman. Her mother was supportive and they maintained a relationship thereafter.

de Milo formed close friendships with other prominent transgender activists such as Carmen Rupe. de Milo and Rupe met in 1961 and remained close friends until Rupe's death in 2011.

On 12 February 2018, de Milo died due to liver cancer. She left most of her belongings to the Aunty Dana Op Shop in Wellington.

== Advocacy ==
de Milo spoke frankly about her struggles living as a trans woman in Aotearoa/New Zealand and expressed concern for other trans people facing similar issues. She was particularly outspoken about discrimination faced within the medical field and by the police. Of the medical field, she stated that trans women like herself had been treated like "guinea pigs" by medical professionals. She expressed concerns that speaking up against this could limit access for future trans people seeking gender-affirming care. She also recalled abuse at the hands of the police, noting that she was once held in Mount Crawford Prison with other trans women for being "idle and disorderly". de Milo also spoke in interviews about the disproportionate discrimination that transgender people face in comparison with cisgender members of the LGBTQ community.

de Milo was a member of the Māori Women's Welfare League, an organisation focused on improving outcomes such as education and health for Māori women. She was also on the board of the Drugs, Health and Development Project and worked as a receptionist at their needle exchange facility. She was a part of the group that formed the Chrissy Witoko Memorial Trust, which was established in 2003 to support those who had been affected by HIV/AIDS.

== Legacy ==
de Milo is considered to be a transgender rights trailblazer, and has been mentioned in articles alongside Carmen Rupe and Georgina Beyer.

After de Milo's death in 2018, politician Jan Logie paid tribute to her in a parliamentary debate. She also had a book dedicated to her by Caren Wilton called My Body, My Business: New Zealand Sex Workers In An Era Of Change. In 2018, shortly before de Milo's death, the Aunty Dana's Op Shop was established in her honor. The shop raises funds for Gender Minorities Aotearoa.
