= Agender New Zealand =

Transgender support organisation

- Formation: 1996; 30 years ago
- Founded at: New Zealand
- Services: Support for transgender people and their families
- Website: Official website (archive)

Agender New Zealand is an organisation supporting transgender people and their families throughout New Zealand. Founded in 1996, Agender works both on a one-to-one basis with individuals as well as hosting national conferences which aim to enable mainstream organisations act in more appropriate ways.

Previous Agender conferences have featured Wellington Mayor Kerry Prendergast, Wellington Central MP Grant Robertson, Carmen Rupe Sarah Lurajud, Associate Minister of Justice Lianne Dalziel and Fuimaono Karl Pulotu-Endemann.

Agender was an active supporter of Georgina Beyer's Human Rights (Gender Identity) Bill which was dropped in 2006 after a legal opinion showed transgender people were already within the ambit of the Human Rights Act.
