= Dylan Mika =

- Born: Dylan Gabriel Mika; 17 April 1972 Auckland, New Zealand
- Died: 20 March 2018 (aged 45) Auckland, New Zealand
- Height: 1.94 m (6 ft 4 1/2 in)
- Weight: 108 kg (17 st 0 lb)
- School: Marcellin College and St Peter's College
- Notable relative: Pat Lam (cousin)

Rugby union career
- Position: Flanker
Provincial / State sides
Years	Team	Apps	(Points)
1994–2000	Auckland	55	
Super Rugby
Years	Team	Apps	(Points)
1996–1998, 2000	Blues	23	
1999	Chiefs		
International career
Years	Team	Apps	(Points)
1994	Samoa	2	(0)
1999	New Zealand	7	(5)

Dylan Gabriel Mika (17 April 1972 – 20 March 2018) was a New Zealand-born rugby union player who represented the national teams of both Samoa and New Zealand.

Born in Auckland, Mika was initially educated at Marcellin College, before moving to St Peter's College. He played mainly as a flanker during his career.

He played provincially for Auckland between 1994 and 2000, and for the Blues in the Super 12. He was drafted into the Chiefs in 1999. In 2000 he returned to the Blues before playing for Auckland in the National Provincial Championship. Following that season he moved to play in Japan.

He first played internationally for Samoa, playing two tests in 1994. He then stood down from international rugby for three years to enable him to play for New Zealand (the All Blacks). He played a total of seven tests and one non-international game for New Zealand—all in 1999. His first match was against his old side Samoa, who were also captained by his cousin, Pat Lam.

He played in several of that year's Tri-Nations matches before being selected for the squad for the 1999 Rugby World Cup. In that tournament he started only one match, against Italy in Huddersfield.

== Retirement and death ==
On his retirement from rugby he returned to New Zealand. Mika, who suffered from diabetes, died from a suspected heart attack in Auckland on 20 March 2018, aged 45.

== Sources ==
- Dylan Mika at the All Blacks (archived)
- "Blues flanker dilemma". scrum.com. 27 April 2000.
- "Ton-up All Blacks rout Italy". bbc.co.uk. 14 October 1999.
- Long, David. "Former player says Blues need a powwow". Sunday News.
- "Biographies". sportsillustrated.cnn.com. 26 September 1999. Archived from the original on 18 November 2007.
- "Physical Activity Guide" (PDF). Ministry of Health.
- "Dylan Mika". scrum.com.
