= FAME Trust Awards =

Annual arts awards in New Zealand

The FAME Trust Awards are annual awards for New Zealand theatre and music practitioners.

The awards come from partners including The FAME Trust, The Acorn Foundation (which is based in the Western Bay of Plenty) and PANNZ (Performing Arts Network of New Zealand). The FAME Trust is a charitable trust, the full name is The Fund For Acting And Musical Endeavours Trust, it was founded in 2007. Entry to the awards is by submission.

== FAME Emerging Practitioner Award ==
The FAME Emerging Practitioner Award is in partnership with the Acorn Foundation. It is a scholarship to support performing arts student who have completed at least their first year of study with skill in music or theatre (including actors, directors, playwrights, storytellers, theatrical technicians and scenographers).

=== 2021 ===
Two students from University of Otago receiving the award in 2021 were third-year student Abhinath Berry (Bachelor of Music) and master's student Jordan Wichman (Theatre Studies). Berry entered as a performer on piano, Jordan entered as a theatre director. Also awarded were Oliver Bramah, studying musical composition at University of Auckland, Maurea Perez-Varea studying acting at Toi Whakaari, Persia Thor-Poet a contemporary dance student at the New Zealand School of Dance, Majenta Gaffar, Studying a Bachelor of Arts at the University of Waikato and Sebastian Hunter (Bachelor of Theatre student at Victoria University of Wellington).

=== 2022 ===
Winners included Michael Lyell-O’Reilly a performing arts manager at Toi Whakaari, Hannah Scholten, a contemporary dance student at the New Zealand School of Dance, Tomairangi Paterson-Waaka at the at NASDA Musical theatre Programme at the Ara Institute of Canterbury.

== FAME Mid-Career Awards ==
The FAME Mid-Career Awards was launched in 2022 in partnership with the Acorn Foundation and PANNZ (Performing Arts Network of New Zealand) for established mid-career artists and is valued at $15,000. In 2023 these awards were expanded into the following categories, Artists Awards and Technical Awards.

=== 2022 ===
Amanaki Lelei Prescott-Faletau, Tupe Lualua and Rodney Bell were the winners of the 2022 awards. Amanaki Lelei Prescott-Faletau is an actor, writer, dancer, choreographer, producer and director. Tupe Lualua is a dancer, choreographer, actor, theatre-maker and educator and director of the Measina Festival and Le Moana theatre and dance company. Rodney Bell is a dancer and performer.

=== 2023 ===
The winners of the Artists Awards were Ben Crowder, Tānemahuta Gray and Hannah Smith, the winners of the Technical Awards were Jane Hakaraia and Rowan Pierce.
