= Adrienne Lili'i =

New Zealand rugby union player

- Born: 9 November 1970 (age 56) Auckland, New Zealand
- Height: 1.63 m (5 ft 4 in)
- Weight: 69 kg (152 lb)
- School: Marcellin College

Rugby union career
- Position: Flanker
Provincial / State sides
Years	Team	Apps	(Points)
- Auckland
-	Waikato		
International career
Years	Team	Apps	(Points)
1999–2004	New Zealand	12	(5)
Medal record
Representing New Zealand
Women's rugby union
Rugby World Cup
Gold medal – first place	2002 Spain	Team competition

Adrienne Lili'i (born 9 November 1970) is a former New Zealand rugby union player. She debuted for the New Zealand women's national side, the Black Ferns, on 16 October 1999 against Canada at Palmerston North. She was selected for the 2002 Women's Rugby World Cup squad and started in four of their five games.

In 1999, Lili'i was part of an unofficial Samoan Manusina team that was invited to the Hong Kong 7s. She was in the Auckland team that won the Women's NPC Championship in 2003.

== Personal life ==
Lili'i is of Samoan descent and was raised in South Auckland. She was born to Tuala Tele’a Lili'i, a social worker, and Margaret, a registered nurse. She played netball, tennis and badminton in her youth and spent two years of high school at St Mary's College in Vaimoso, Samoa.

She is married to Danny Leaoasavai'i, Dawn Raid Entertainment founder and former rapper Brotha D. They have two children.
