= Ura (dance) =

Popular dance of the Cook Islands

Ura is one of the popular traditional dances of the Cook Islands, a Polynesian sacred ritual usually performed by a female dancer who moves her body to tell a story, accompanied by intense drumming by at least five drummers. Moving the hips, legs and hands give off different gestures to the audience to tell a tale, typically related to the natural landscape such as the ocean and birds and flowers, but also feelings of love and sadness. The ura dance has three distinct components; the ura pa'u (drum dances), korero (legends) and kaparima (action songs). To perform the ura, women typically wear a pareu and a kikau (grass) skirt, with flowers and shell headbands and necklaces known as ei. Men during the dance are said to "vigorously flap their knees in a semi-crouched position while holding their upper bodies steady", and they typically wear kikau skirts and headbands. The drumming group, an integral part of the ura, typically consists of a lead drummer (pate taki), support lead (pate takirua), a double player (tokere or pate akaoro) playing wooden gongs, and two other players playing skin drums (pa'u and mango). The finest performances of the ura are put on in Rarotonga.

A sexually charged variant of the ura dance is known at the ura piani in which both men and women are involved in telling the story. Other variations include the ura rore (stilt dance), ura tairiri (fan dance), ura korare (spear dance), and ura rama (torch dance).
