= Shark in the Park =

- Genre: Police procedural
- Created by: Graeme Tetley
- Written by: Duncan Holland; Charlie Strachan; Simon Morris; Donna Malane; Liddy Holloway; Fran Walsh
- Directed by: Peter Barrett; Lex Van Os; Steve La Hood; Yvonne Mackay; Keith Hunter; Dan McKirdy
- Starring: Jeffrey Thomas; K. J. Wilson; Russell Smith; William Kircher; Rima Te Wiata; Joanna Briant; Robert Pollock; Geoffrey Heath; Grant Tilly; Nathaniel Lees; Darren Young
- Composer: Peter Blake
- Country of origin: New Zealand
- Original language: English
- No. of series: 3
- No. of episodes: 38

Production
- Executive producer: Dave Gibson (series 2–3)
- Producer: Ruth Franks
- Cinematography: Wayne Vinten
- Editors: Allan Honey; Geoff Conway; Annie Collins; Michael Bennett
- Running time: 60 minutes
- Production companies: Television New Zealand (series 1); Gibson Group (series 2–3)

Original release
- Network: Television One
- Release: 5 April 1989 – 18 December 1991

Shark in the Park is a New Zealand police procedural. It revolved around the professional and private lives of a group of officers at a Wellington police station under the command of Inspector Brian "Sharky" Finn. The title came from the informal code term used by officers to indicate that the Inspector was about and they should "look busy".

The series ran for three series from 1989–92, totalling 38 episodes. Many of the cast had regular roles in the series and several became well known throughout New Zealand as a result of the series. The show also featured actors in guest roles, among them Lucy Lawless, Michael Hurst, Temuera Morrison, and Karl Urban.

The series was produced by the Gibson Group and broadcast by Television One – it has since been repeated on TVNZ 6. Writers for the show included Fran Walsh, later to become well known through her association with Peter Jackson and her work on films such as the Lord of the Rings trilogy.

== Cast and characters ==
=== Main cast ===
- Jeffrey Thomas as Inspector Brian Finn
- K. J. Wilson as Sergeant Ian Jesson
- Russell Smith as Detective Bernie Gregory
- William Kircher as B.P.
- Rima Te Wiata as Jacko (series 1–2)
- Joanna Briant as Margaret "Wally" Wallace
- Robert Pollock as Dingo (series 1–2)
- Geoffrey Heath as Roger Blackman
- Grant Tilly as Inspector Englebretsen (series 2–3)
- Nathaniel Lees as Barker (series 2–3)
- Darren Young as Om (series 2–3)

=== Recurring cast ===
- John Wraight as Smudge
- David Geary as Gerald
- Brett Bailey as UB1 (Uniform Branch 1)
- Des Stephens as UB1 (Uniform Branch 1)
- Jon Pheloung as Nifty

=== Guest cast ===
- Neil Gudsell as Constable Ra (series 1)
- Jenny Ludlam as Diane (series 1) / Josie Tucker (series 2)
- Mark Wright as Tony (series 1)
- Robyn Malcolm as Janice (series 1) / Janet Finn (series 2–3)
- Alan Brough (series 1)
- Ken Blackburn as Superintendent (series 2–3)

== Episodes ==
=== Series 1 (1989) ===
No. overall	No. in series	Title	Directed by	Written by	Original release date
1	1	"Sunday Roast"	Tony Wilson	Graeme Tetley & Chris Hampson	5 April 1989
2	2	"Loose Ends"	Daniel McKirdy	Charlie Strachan	12 April 1989
3	3	"Lamb to the Slaughter"	Ginette McDonald	Norelle Scott	19 April 1989
4	4	"The Cost of Living"	Lex van Os	Wendy Jackson	10 May 1989
5	5	"Look Before You Leap"	Lex van Os	Charlie Strachan	17 May 1989
6	6	"A Fair Cop"	Lex van Os & Andrew Shaw	Fran Walsh	24 May 1989
7	7	"Lynn"	Murray Reece	Fran Walsh & Graeme Tetley	31 May 1989
8	8	"Orchestral Manoevres"	David Copeland	Simon Morris	7 June 1989
9	9	"A Ticket Home"	Tony Wilson	Norelle Scott	14 June 1989
10	10	"Domestics"	Daniel McKirdy	Charlie Strachan	21 June 1989

=== Series 2 (1990) ===
No. overall	No. in series	Title	Directed by	Written by	Original release date
11	1	"Prospects"	Lex van Os	Charlie Strachan	13 July 1990
12	2	"First Offence"	Daniel McKirdy	Simon Morris	20 July 1990
13	3	"The First Cut is the Deepest"	Lex van Os	Donna Malane	27 July 1990
14	4	"Diversions"	Daniel McKirdy	Michael Wilson	3 August 1990
15	5	"Victims"	Lex van Os	Duncan Holland	10 August 1990
16	6	"Lies"	Daniel McKirdy	Norelle Scott	17 August 1990
17	7	"Technical K.O."	Guy Hollier	Charlie Strachan	24 August 1990
18	8	"Acting Sergeant"	Yvonne MacKay	Simon Morris	31 August 1990
19	9	"Whispering Grass"	Peter Barrett	Fran Walsh	7 September 1990
20	10	"Fall From Grace"	Yvonne MacKay	Donna Malane & Charlie Strachan	14 September 1990
21	11	"Ten-Zero Dingo"	Peter Barrett	Duncan Holland	21 September 1990
22	12	"Out of Place"	Yvonne MacKay	Mary Taylor	28 September 1990
23	13	"Guilty Knowledge"	Peter Barrett	Fran Walsh	5 October 1990

=== Series 3 (1991) ===
No. overall	No. in series	Title	Directed by	Written by	Original release date
24	1	"White Heat"	Peter Barrett	Unknown	28 August 1991
25	2	"Allsorts"	Keith Hunter	Unknown	4 September 1991
26	3	"Silver Spurs"	Lex van Os	Frances Walsh	11 September 1991
27	4	"You've Got to Have Mates"	Peter Barrett	Simon Morris	18 September 1991
28	5	"Suffer the Little Children"	Steve La Hood	Unknown	25 September 1991
29	6	"Thicker Than Water"	Lex van Os	Unknown	2 October 1991
30	7	"Double or Quits"	Peter Barrett	Unknown	16 October 1991
31	8	"Et Tu, Brute"	Steve La Hood	Unknown	23 October 1991
32	9	"The Only Thing to Fear"	David Copeland	Unknown	30 October 1991
33	10	"Give a Dog a Bad Name"	Peter Barrett	Jane Gallately	13 November 1991
34	11	"Lovers and Losers"	Keith Hunter	Unknown	20 November 1991
35	12	"A Sensitive Family Matter"	Steve La Hood	Unknown	27 November 1991
36	13	"Loyalties"	Peter Barrett	Unknown	4 December 1991
37	14	"A Little Help From My Friend"	Keith Hunter	Unknown	11 December 1991
38	15	"Nothing But the Truth"	Steve La Hood	Unknown	18 December 1991
