= Mika X =

New Zealand Māori Singer

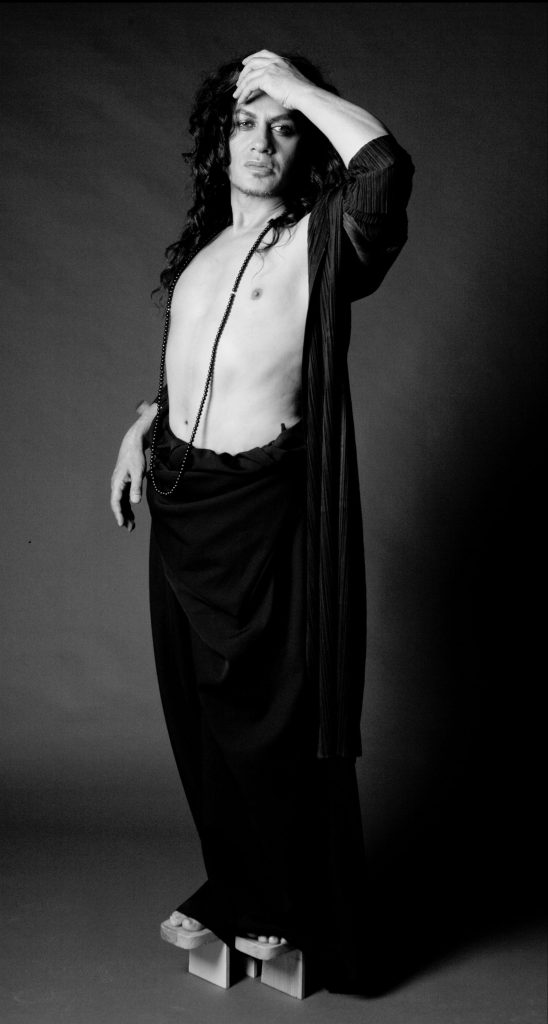
- Born: Terrance John Pou; 8 February 1962 (age 64); Timaru, New Zealand
- Other names: Neil Gudsell, Mika, Mika Haka
- Occupations: Singer; actor; choreographer; comedian; filmmaker; fashion designer
- Organizations: Mika Haka Foundation; Mika Haka Studio; Patangaroa Entertainment Limited

Mika (born Terrance John Pou, né Neil Gudsell, 8 February 1962; also known by the stage names Mika Haka and Mika X) is a New Zealand Māori singer, performance artist, actor, filmmaker, TV producer and comedian.

He has toured the world, performing his cabaret shows and music, including 10 performances at the Edinburgh Festival Fringe. He has also acted in TV shows and movies including Shark in the Park, The Piano, and Shortland Street. Mika has released five music albums including Do U Like What U See, Mika Haka and Mika Versus Fashion.

== Name ==
Mika was born Terrance John Pou, but was legally adopted immediately by Bill and Dawn Gudsell, who named him Neil. In 1988, musician Dalvanius Prime suggested he change his name to the gender-neutral name Mika, which he did in 1990. He has since gone by the name Mika Haka, and currently uses the stage name Mika X.

== Early life ==
Terrance John Pou was born on 8 February 1962 in Timaru, New Zealand to Elizabeth Halkett and was adopted at birth by New Zealand European couple Dawn and Bill Gudsell. He came out as gay at age 12. While attending Timaru Boys High School, he played rugby and competed in athletics, including at the national athletics championship. In 1988 Gudsell placed eighth in the inaugural Suzuki World Cup aerobic championships.

After high school, Gudsell became a hairdresser in the small suburb of Spreydon, Christchurch; however, after winning New Zealand Flash Dance Championships he quit his job and opened up his own dance studio, Miyake Dance Studio at Peterborough Arts Centre. In 1982, Gudsell moved to Los Angeles with his boyfriend, an African-American man in the US Navy, for nine months before returning to New Zealand. Gudsell moved to Christchurch in 1984 and attended the New Zealand School of Dance in 1985, but left the school nine months later.

== Performance career ==
=== Early stage and television work ===
In 1985, Gudsell joined Te Ohu Whakaari, a Wellington Maori theatre company which toured nationally and internationally. The next year, he left Te Ohu Whakaari and moved to Dunedin to work on a Te Maori exhibition.

He performed his one-man show Mahi Whakangahau in 1988. During the show, Gudsell performed New Zealand songs, including "I Have Loved Me A Man" by Allison Durbin. The single was released by Warner Music with a music video promoting safe sex.

In 1989, he played Constable Ra in the TV drama Shark in the Park and also the young Carmen Rupe in the TV biopic Carmen. His solo show Neil Gudsell Uncooked produced by Merata Mita was performed at the 1990 Adelaide Fringe.

=== Stage shows I Loved me a Man, Lava Lover and Pearl Harbour 1990–1994 ===
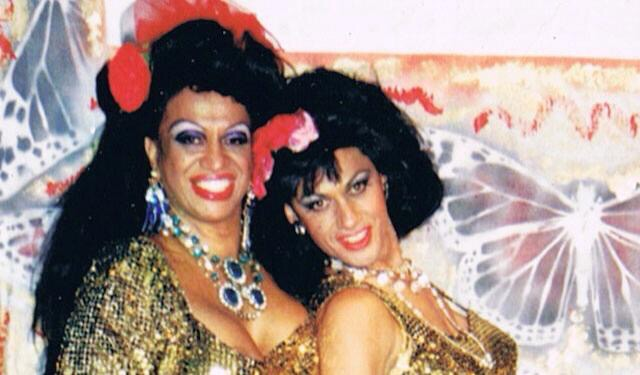
Mika Haka (right) in 1994 with Carmen Rupe (left)

In 1990, the single I Have Loved Me a Man was released and reached 46th on the New Zealand music singles charts. The song was produced by Dalvanius Prime, the producer to Poi E. At about this time, Gudsell, under instructions from Dalvanius, changed his name to Mika, a non-binary version of "Mike".

In 1991, Mika released his first song, "Juiced", with producer Alan Jansson. He toured the show "Juiced World Tour" in 1991 and 1992.

Credited as Neil Mika Gudsell, Mika played the minor role of takatāpui man Tahu in the 1993 film The Piano.

Mika performed at the 1992 Hero Party at Princes Wharf in Auckland, singing his original song "Lava Lover". The performance, which began with a karanga with Mika on top of the stage, included over 300 performers: drag queens, Pacific Island dancers, lesbian taiaha, and men in semen costumes. His backdrop was Keith Haring-inspired art featuring yellow squares with condom symbols and safe-sex messaging. He ended his performance with a gay haka that he created called "Tenei Toku Ure". In the following two years, Mika put on four shows. Despite some setbacks when an agent stole money from him, he was the warm-up act for Grace Jones at Roxy NYC.

=== Black Carnival, Do U like what U see? and Edinburgh 1995–1999 ===
Mika was a model for photographer Christine Webster's photograph Mika: Kai Tahu.

In 1996, Mika released his first debut album titled Do U Like What U See. A music video was released for the title track.

Mika performed at the 1997 Edinburgh Fringe Festival. He was cast in the Rocky Horror Picture Show at the Timaru Theatre in October 1997.

In 1998, Mika collaborated with composer Gareth Farr and Mark James Hamilton on the show Ahi Ataahua. The show was first performed at Danspaleis in Wellington and then later at the 1998 Edinburgh festival. Mika collaborated with Mark James Hamilton on multiple projects over six years including The Angel Tour, Tribal Hollywood, Mika Haka, Rawaka and on TV with Mika Live and Te Mika Show.

On 1 November 1998, Mika performed on the Stonewall Equality Show 1998 at the Royal Albert Hall, and then toured internationally.

=== Mika Haka, Torotoro, Te Plastic Māori and return to TV 2000–2009 ===
In 2000, Mika created a dance company, Torotoro, with Mark Hamilton and 10 young Māori and Pacific Island performers. They were the subject of a documentary, Mika Haka Kids. They performed several times at the Edinburgh Festival.

Mika's second album, Mika Haka, was released in 2001. Torotoro dancers featured in music videos for the songs "Ahi Atāahua" and "Wera Wera".

In 2004, Mika starred in his own TV variety show on Maori Television, Mika Live which first aired on 28 March. It was renamed Te Mika Show in 2006.

In 2005, Mika performed with a metal band Te Plastic Māori, including at the Montreal Fringe Festival in 2005. Their song Poti was nominated at the APRA MAIOHA awards in 2007.

=== Aotea Centre, Mika Versus Fashion, Rugby World Cup, Salon Mika 2010–2013 ===
In March 2010, alongside the Auckland Philharmonia Orchestra, Mika performed at the ASB Theatre at Aotea Centre to open the Aroha Festival. The show was a gala-like event that featured performances that were in the festival and Mika performing his greatest hits including "Lava Lover" and "Do U Like What U See". Later in that year, Mika released his third album, Mika Versus Fashion. The album featured seven songs performed in Māori, English, Spanish and French, instrumentals of those songs, and a cover of "La Vie en rose". The album can be described as techno-dance and electronica.

On 23 September 2011, Mika put together the largest show of his career called Mika's Aroha Mardi Gras. As part of the 2011 Rugby World Cup that happened in New Zealand, Mika put on a free outdoor concert at the Takutai Square, Britomart, in downtown Auckland. The show had over 760 performers and it took months of rehearsals before the event took place. The show played twice on the same day with the first show going from 6 pm to 7:30 pm and second show from 8 pm to 10 pm, with thousands of people attending both times. The second show was prerecorded and broadcast on Māori TV on 14 October 2011. The event happened at the same time as Ireland v Russia and Argentina vs Scotland in the Rugby World Cup. The event featured Rena Owen as the storyteller and MC for the evening, and Mika performing his well known singles, "In the morning" (feat Keisha Castle-Hughes), Lava Lover RWC version (feat Edward Ru), "Wera Wera" (feat Erakah), Taniwha (feat Te Tai Tonga), Caged Animals (feat Kiri Nathan), Friend (feat everyone), and "Get It On" a remix of an earlier song called Spoof. In 2012, Mika assumed the role as chair person for the non-profit organisation, "Ngā Aho Whakaari". Ngā Aho Whakaari is a not-for-profit Incorporated Society that represents Māori who work in the New Zealand screen industry. Mika ended his role in 2013. In 2013, Auckland had its own Fringe Festival. Mika did a season of cabaret shows with a live band and special guest including Megan Alatini at one of Auckland's busiest nightclubs "Switch Bar". The show was called "Salon Mika". Mika went on to perform eight shows during the festival, to a sell-out crowd. With the success of Salon Mika, he decided to take the cabaret show on tour across the world.

=== Dress to Express, Coffee, Loved Me a Man 2014–2016 ===
On Waitangi Day 2014, Mika put together a small variety show at one of Auckland's nightclubs. At the end of the event, Mika performed his new single "Dress to Express" featuring Zakk d'Larté and Hannah Martin. The single produced a music video with all three dancing and singing the song with special effects. The single reached the top 40s on the iTunes New Zealand Charts. The success of the song led to releasing another single later in the year. This time releasing the remixed version of "Coffee" Featuring Lavina Williams. The single also produced a music video that featured well known LGBT members of the community. On 1 May 2016, Mika put on a one-day festival similar to the 2011 Mika Aroha Mardi Gras closing down Karangahape Road to perform on the street. The event was called "Mika Aroha Mardi Gras The Red Light District". The event lasted for over seven hours with people flooding the street to attend the event. The event featured Mr Gay World 2013 and New Zealand's Got Talent semi finalist Christopher Olwage, Queens Of Panguru (Ramon Te Wake, Jay Tewake and Maihi Makiha), a music performance from Mika himself and many more performances. At the festival, some of Queens of Panguru TV series was filmed for the first episode.

On 9 July 2016, New Zealand celebrated the 30 year anniversary of Homosexual Law Reform Act 1986. An event was held at the Skycity Convention Centre called the Rainbow Gala, to celebrate the anniversary. Mika Haka opened the event with a branded new song, a remixed version of "Loved Me a Man" featuring Lavina Williams. The music video of the song was released in October 2016. The video showed some of Mika's past performances in music, video and art. It shows Mika singing in a night club in an intimate setting and seeing Mika as a gay Maori Jesus-like character.

=== Queens of Panguru, Swimming with Sharks, Salon Mika Live 2017–2019 ===
Throughout 2016 and 2017, the filming and editing of Queens of Panguru was in production. Mika was the creator, creative designer and executive producer of the TV series. Some of Mika's music also featured in the TV series. The show was televised weekly on Māori Television, with the premiere on 22 March 2017.

In February 2017, Mika released his fourth album, Swimming with Sharks. The album featured dance and electronic versions of his original music including "Swimming with Sharks", "Taniwha" and "In the Morning" which featured Keisha Castle-Hughes. Mika also featured in Costa Kerdemelidis' song "Tango on a Tightrope" from Kermelidis' 2017 album The Big Shake.

In October 2017, Mika put together a charity concert to raise money and supplies for the Auckland City Mission to give to the homeless in Auckland City. In August 2018, Mika released a Live Album from his Salon Mika caberate show that he performed at the Edinburgh fringe festival. In June 2019, Mika returned to his hometown of Timaru and accepted 2018 Teschemaker Cup for his contribution to demonstrating outstanding achievement in his chosen field of performing arts at his high school, Timaru Boys' High School. On 10 September 2019, it was announced that Mika was cast as Ngati Haua entertainer for "Natives Go Wild" show at the Sydney Opera House. He will perform in seven shows between 22 and 27 October.

=== Aroha Collective and rereleased music 2020 ===
On 10 April 2020, Mika released his fifth album "The Aroha Collective". The album was originally scheduled to be released on New Zealand's version of Anti-Bullying Day, "Pink Shirt Day" on May 18, but due to the COVID-19 pandemic in New Zealand Mika released the album early to give provide content during lockdown. The album was a collaboration album sung in Te Reo featuring artists including Lavina Williams, King Homeboy, Yorke and Te Amo. On July 13, Mika rereleased his album "Mika Haka" for Matariki and the 20th anniversary since the original release.

=== Singing the national anthem 2023 ===
On the 28 May 2023, Mika performed the New Zealand national anthem at the historical Lani Daniels vs Alrie Meleisea IBF world heavyweight title fight. The event was televised internationally in FITE and in New Zealand on Sky TV Sky Sports.

== Directing career ==
=== GURL ===
Mika directed, wrote, produced, and played the lead role in the short film GURL about the life of drag queen Carmen Rupe. Production began in 2019 and the 20-minute film premiered at the 2020 New Zealand International Film Festival as part of a collection of Māori and Pasifika short films. Mika also wrote the album soundtrack to the movie which released on 24 July 2020.

== Conviction for attempting to dissuade a witness ==
In April 2017, Mika X met with a person who had been sexually abused by businessman and arts patron James Wallace. Wallace was facing charges over the abuse, and the victim was someone who wanted to get into the entertainment industry. Mika offered to pay the victim $15,000 to drop the charges. Mika also offered the victim work in the Gold Coast and the United States.

In April 2018, Mika was charged for attempting to pervert the course of justice. He was granted temporary name suppression while on trial. The trial was originally scheduled in June 2020, but due to COVID-19 it was postponed. In February 2021, Mika pleaded guilty on two counts of attempting to pervert the course of justice, and on 30 March 2021, he was sentenced to 11 months of home detention. James Wallace was found guilty of three counts of indecent assault and two counts of attempting to pervert the course of justice; he was jailed for two years and four months.

== Politics ==
Mika stood for The Opportunities Party in Auckland Central at the 2017 New Zealand general election, and was ranked tenth on TOP's party list. He came fourth in the electorate, with 681 votes, and did not enter Parliament.

== Discography ==
=== Singles ===
- "I Have Loved Me a Man" (1990)
- "Juiced" (1991)
- "Lava Lover" (1992)
- "Do U Like What U See?" (1996)
- "My Angel" (2000)
- "Ahi Ataahua" (2001)
- "Werawera" (2001)
- "Poti with Te Plastic Maori" (2007)
- "The Closer I Get to You" feat. Mirrah (2008)
- "Dress to Express" feat. Zakk d'Larté and Hannah Martin (2014)
- "Coffee" feat. Lavina Williams (2014)
- "Loved Me a Man" feat. Lavina Williams (2016)

=== EPs ===
- Juiced (1992)

=== Albums ===
- Do U Like What U See (1996)
- Mika Haka (2001, rereleased in 2020)
- Mika Versus Fashion (2010)
- The Aroha Collective (2020)
- Gurl The Movie soundtrack (2020)

=== Remix album ===
- Swimming with Sharks (2017)

=== Live albums ===
- Kapai Kabaret (1996)
- Salon Mika Live in Edinburgh (2018)

=== Other appearances ===
Title	Year	Artist(s)	Album	Note
"Tango on a Tightrope"	2017	Costa Kerdemelidis	The Big Shake	

== Performances and tours ==
Tour Name	Location	Dates	Number of Shows	Ref
Juiced Tour	World	1991–1992	–	
Hero Party	Princes Warf, Downtown Auckland, New Zealand	1992	1	
Kapai Kabaret	La Cucina Bistro & Bar, Auckland, New Zealand	15–25 August 1995	10	
Kapai Kabaret	Taki Rua Theatre, Wellington, New Zealand	13–23 December 1995	10	
Stonewall Equality Show 1998	Royal Albert Hall	1998	1	
Mika and the APO – Pō A Tribal Pop Opera	ASB Theatre, Auckland, New Zealand	12 March 2010	1	
Mika Versus Fashion – CD Launch	The Crib, Auckland, New Zealand	21 September 2010	1	
RWC 2011: Mika's Aroha Mardi Gras	Takutai Square, Auckland, New Zealand	23 September 2011	2	
Salon Mika	Switch Bar, Auckland, New Zealand	13 February 2013 to 23 February 2013	8	
Tribute to Carmen Rupe with the Auckland Philharmonia Orchestra	Town Hall, Auckland, New Zealand	11 March 2013	1	
Mika's Aroha Mardi Gras	Legend Bar, Auckland, New Zealand	6 February 2014	1	
Auckland Pride Gala	Q Theatre, Auckland, New Zealand	7 February 2014	1	
Big Gay Out	Coyle Park, Auckland, New Zealand	9 February 2014	1	
Room 1334	Basement, Auckland, New Zealand	14 February 2015	1	
Salon Mika: On the Water	Z Pier Marina, Auckland, New Zealand	8 March 2015	1	
SXSW Room 1334	Webberville Baptist church, Austin, Texas, USA	22 March 2015	1	
Mika's Aroha Mardi Gras: The Red Light District	Karangahape Road, Auckland, New Zealand	1 May 2016	1	
Rainbow Gala celebrates 30-year-anniversary of homosexual reform bill	SkyCity Convention Centre, Auckland, New Zealand	9 July 2016	1	
Family Bar's Big Eleventh Birthday!	Family Bar K Road, Auckland, New Zealand	14 August 2016	1	
All-Stars Gala Fundraiser	Halo Bar & Restaurant, Auckland, New Zealand	18 February 2017	1	
Pō - Beautiful Darkness	St Matthew Church, Auckland, New Zealand	10 October 2017	2	
Natives Go Wild	Sydney Opera House	22–27 October 2019	7	
Big Gay Out	Coyle Park, Auckland, New Zealand	9 February 2020	1	
NZ Spirit Festival	Tanglewood Retreat	27 February 2020	1	
Lani Daniels vs Alrie Meleisea Next World Champion	Eventfinda Stadium	27 May 2023	1	

== Awards ==
Year	Award Ceremony	Award	Work	Art	Result	Ref
2007	APRA Maioha Award	Best Te Reo Maori song of the year	Poti with Te Plastic Maori	Music	Nominated	
2009	New Zealand Qantas TV Awards	Best Popular Documentary	Mika Haka Kids	Television	Nominated	
2013	Auckland Fringe Festival Awards	Best Performance	Salon Mika	Music	Won	
2013	Auckland Fringe Festival Awards	Best Production in Cabaret Burlesque	Salon Mika	Music	Won	
2016	BTW Promotions	Charity Award	Mika Haka Foundation	Community Work	Won	
2019	Timaru Boys' High School	Outstanding Achievement	Himself	Performing Arts	Won	
2020	NZIFF	Ngā Whanaunga Māori Pasifika Shorts Best Film Award	GURL	Short Film	Nominated	
2020	NZIFF	Ngā Whanaunga Māori Pasifika Shorts CineMāori Audience Award	GURL	Short Film	Won	
2020	Wairoa Māori Film Festival	Whenua Jury - Best Māori Director (Short Film)	GURL	Short Film	Won	
2021	Calcutta International Cult Film Festival (FILMS OF THE MONTH – JAN-FEB 2021)	Best LGBT Film	GURL	Short Film	Won	
2021	Calcutta International Cult Film Festival (FILMS OF THE MONTH – JAN-FEB 2021)	Outstanding Achievement Award	GURL	Short Film	Won	
2021	Brazil International Monthly Film Festival	Best Actor For Mediam Length Film (Awarded to Jay Tewake)	GURL	Short Film	Won	
