= Jackie Clarke =

New Zealand entertainer, singer and comedian

Jackie Clarke MNZM
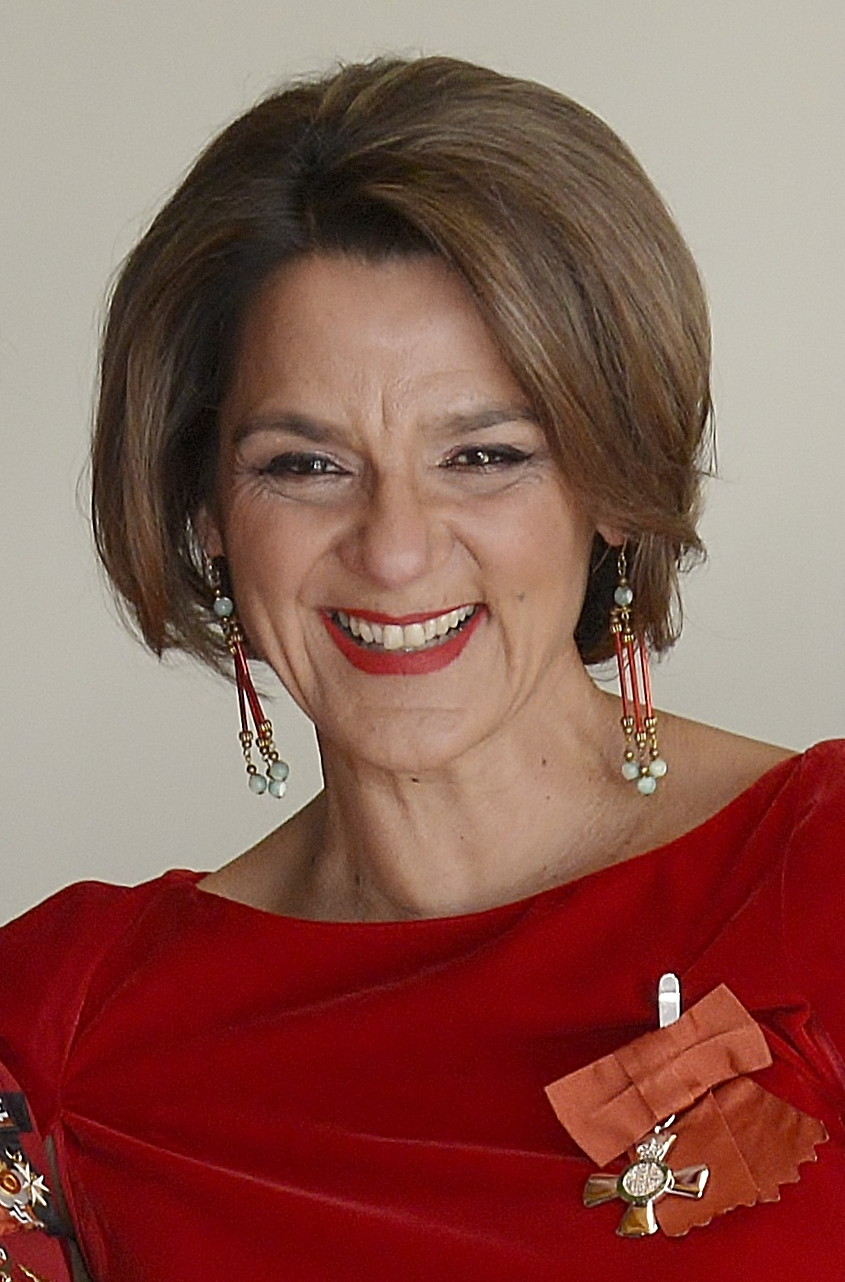
- Clarke in 2018
- Born: Jacqueline Emma Clarke; 22 March 1966 (age 60); Christchurch, New Zealand
- Occupations: Actress; Comedian; Singer

Jacqueline Emma Clarke MNZM (born 22 March 1966) is a New Zealand entertainer, singer and comedian. She was a judge on New Zealand Idol in 2005.

In 2016, she was named Top Female Artist by the Variety Artists Club of New Zealand.

In the 2018 Queen's Birthday Honours, Clarke was appointed a Member of the New Zealand Order of Merit, for services to the entertainment industry.

In November 2024 she was presented with the Benny Award from the Variety Artists Club of New Zealand, the highest honour for a New Zealand variety entertainer.

== Early life ==
Clarke was born in Christchurch, New Zealand She has a twin sister Robyn, who is a nurse. Clarke is of Samoan, Scottish and English descent.

== Credits (incomplete) ==
=== Television ===
- the voices for Gracie, Mrs. Milk and Slo-Mo from The Adventures of Massey Ferguson (2004)
- Judge for the second season of New Zealand Idol (2005)
- Judge for the second and third seasons of Showcase (1997–98)
- Saturday Live (TV2) co-host
- Skitz (TV3) (1993)
- The Dreamstone as Wildit, Zarag
- Molly's Gang (1995)
- The Semisis (TV3) (1998)
- The Jaquie Brown Diaries (2008)
- Power Rangers Dino Charge (2015) (voice)
- Power Rangers Dino Super Charge (2016) (voice)
- Power Rangers Super Ninja Steel (2018) (voice)
- Power Rangers Beast Morphers (2020) (voice)

=== Film ===
- GURL

=== Documentary ===
- Wise Women and Song (TV1)
- Twins (TV2)

=== Theatre ===
- A Christmas Carol (ATC)
- Mum's the Word (NZ tour)
- Joseph and the Amazing Technicolour Dreamcoat (New Zealand tour)
- Porgy and Bess (Mercury Theatre)
- Little Shop of Horrors (Sky City Theatre)
- The Underwatermelonman (New Zealand International Festival of the Arts)
- And the World Goes 'Round (Sky City Theatre)
- C – A Musical (Circa Theatre)

=== Singing ===
- Sirens (with Tina Cross)
- Auckland Philharmonia
- Christchurch Symphony
- Taranaki Arts Festival
- Broadway Songbirds (with Ellie Smith) at Downstage Theatre
- Christchurch Festival
- Love Hate Relationship (with Tim Beveridge and Penny Dodd) for the Tauranga Arts Festival
- When The Cat's Been Spayed
- Coca-Cola Xmas in the Park
- Schweppes Showtime
- NBR Stadium Spectacular
- Sky City Starlight Symphony and Lakeside
- NZSO (My Fair Lady, Around the World in 80 minutes)
- APO (Blockbusters 2001, Decades of Rock 2004, 2005)
- the CS (The Proms, Fresh Sounds 2000)
- Dunedin Sinphonia (ENZO 2000, Carnival of the Animals 2002)
- The Ladykillers
