= Carmen Rupe =

New Zealand drag performer (1936–2011)

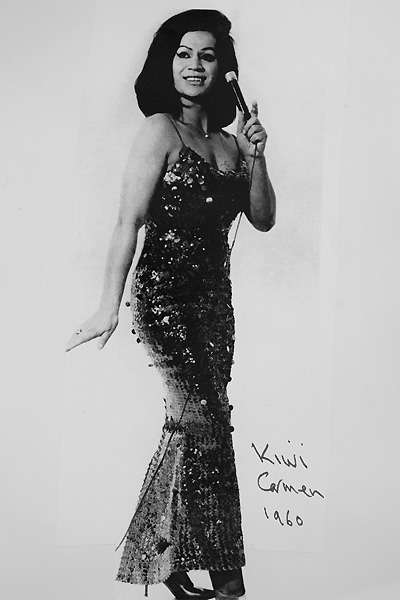
- Rupe in 1960
- Born: 10 October 1936; Taumarunui, New Zealand
- Died: 15 December 2011 (aged 75); Sydney, Australia
- Other names: Carmen, Kiwi Carmen
- Occupations: Drag performer; brothel keeper; activist

Carmen Rupe (10 October 1936 – 15 December 2011) was a New Zealand drag performer, brothel keeper, anti-discrimination activist, would-be politician and HIV/AIDS activist. Carmen Rupe was New Zealand's first drag queen to reach celebrity status. She was a trans woman.

== Life ==
Born in Taumarunui, Rupe had twelve siblings. Her mother was of Ngāti Hāua and Ngāti Heke-a-Wai descent, while her father was of Ngāti Maniapoto. She relocated to the urban centres of Auckland and Wellington. After doing drag performances while doing compulsory military training and periods working as a nurse and waiter, Rupe moved to Sydney's Kings Cross in the late 1950s. In the 1970s, she became notorious for the sexually tolerant venues she established in Wellington, and was renowned as a matriarchal figure among local trans communities. She was noted as a friend and inspirational figure to Dana de Milo, another prominent transgender activist.

Taking the name of the Romani Flamenco dancer Carmen Amaya, Rupe became Australia's first Māori drag performer and from that time on lived as a woman. A whole range of work followed, including snake-work, hula dancing and prostitution. Carmen never formally worked at Les Girls but over the years did some guest spots. She described how local police treated her: "I was locked up in Long Bay about a dozen times. But it made me a stronger person today."

== Police v Rupe ==
In 1966, Rupe was arrested while waiting for a taxi after a night out, charged by the police for 'frequenting with felonious intent' because she was wearing women's clothing. Despite misgendering Rupe, the case was a landmark one for the trans community, as Judge McCarthy ruled that he was "unable to find anything in our law which says that it is unlawful for a male to attire himself in female clothing."

== Autobiography ==
In 1988, an autobiography was published, outlining her escapades "from school boy to successful business woman". Carmen: My Life was written with Paul Martin and published by Benton Ross.

== Politics ==
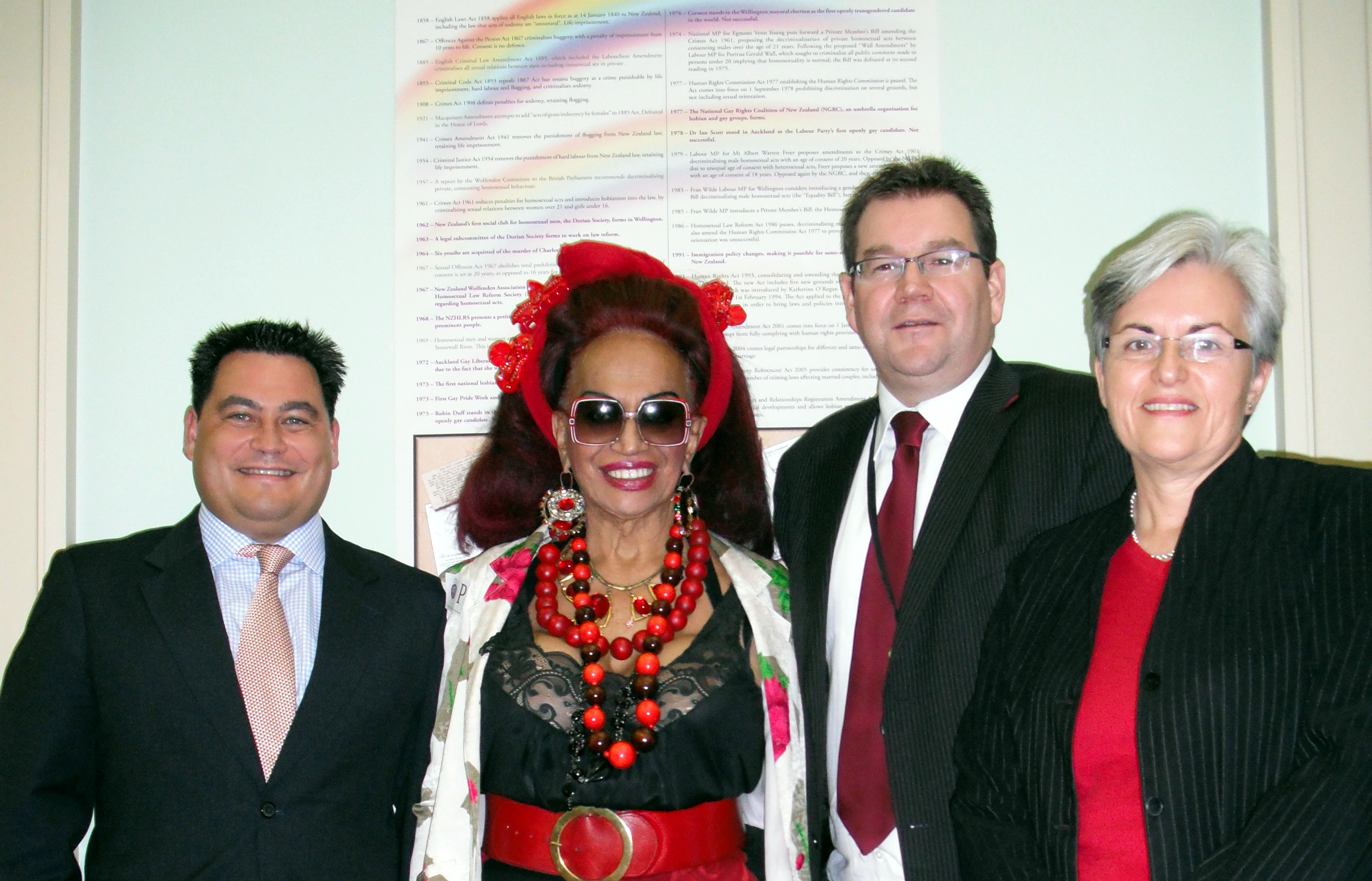
Rupe in 2009 in Wellington with Charles Chauvel (left), Grant Robertson, and Maryan Street

In Wellington Carmen ran Carmen's International Coffee Lounge and the Balcony strip club. Despite the law criminalising homosexual acts, Carmen challenged the overt discrimination and prejudice against people in the gay and transgender communities. She was not afraid to speak to the press and was summoned to appear before the Privileges Committee by Prime Minister Robert Muldoon for suggesting some MPs were gay or bisexual.

In 1977, she ran for the Wellington mayoralty, with the support of local businessman Sir Bob Jones, with the slogans get in behind and Carmen for mayor and a platform of gay marriage and legalised brothels, though neither of these are local-government matters in New Zealand. Michael Fowler won re-election as Mayor.

== Last years ==
Rupe returned to Surry Hills, Sydney where she lived the remainder of her life. In 2003, she was inducted into the Variety Hall of Fame. In 2008, she rode her mobility scooter topless at the head of the Decade of the Divas float at the Gay and Lesbian Mardi Gras. She was a prominent member of Agender, the New Zealand transgender group.

Rupe died of kidney failure in St Vincent's Hospital, Sydney, on 15 December 2011, after a fall and hip surgery earlier in the year; she was 75.

== Legacy ==
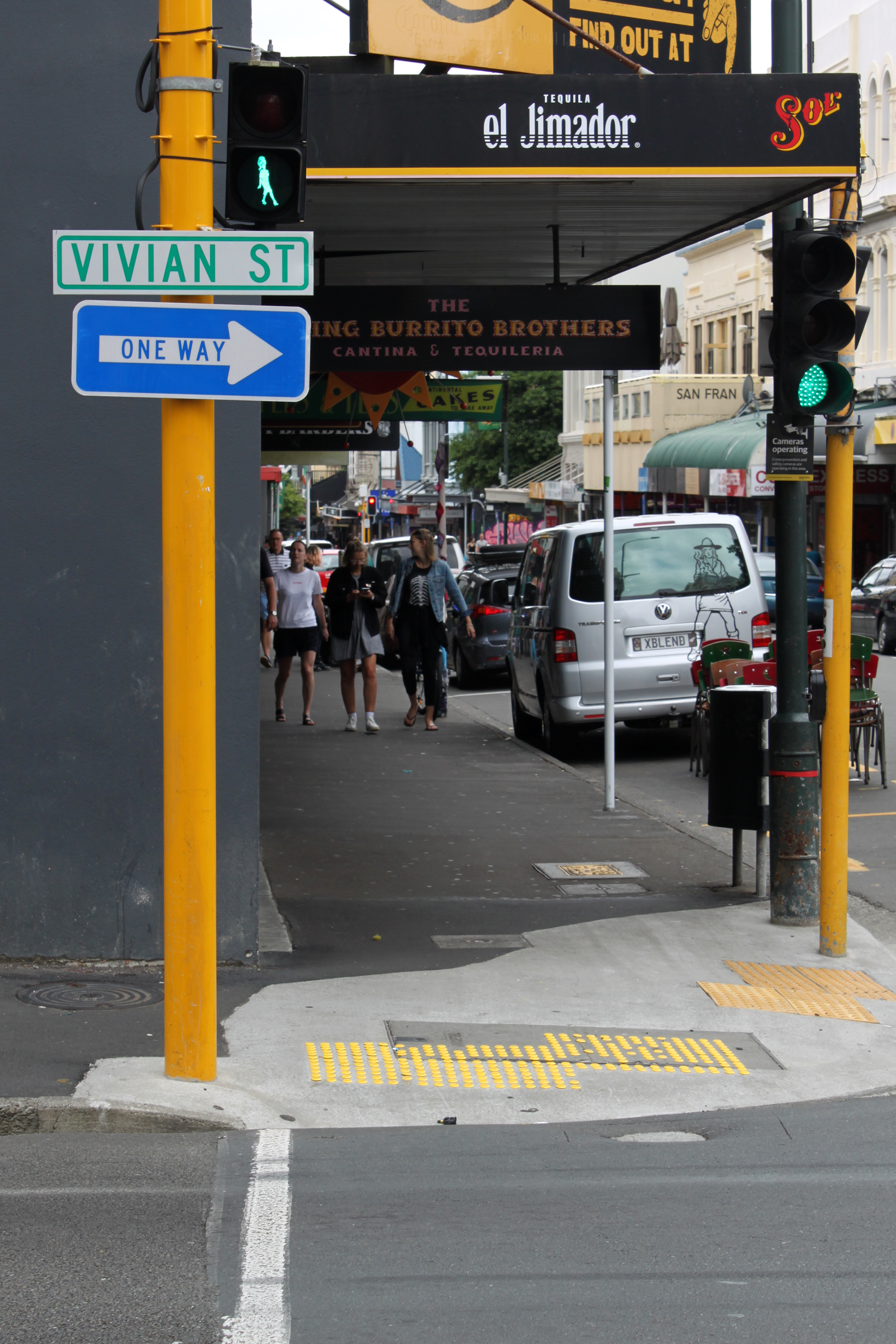
A green pedestrian light depicting Rupe on Cuba Street, Wellington

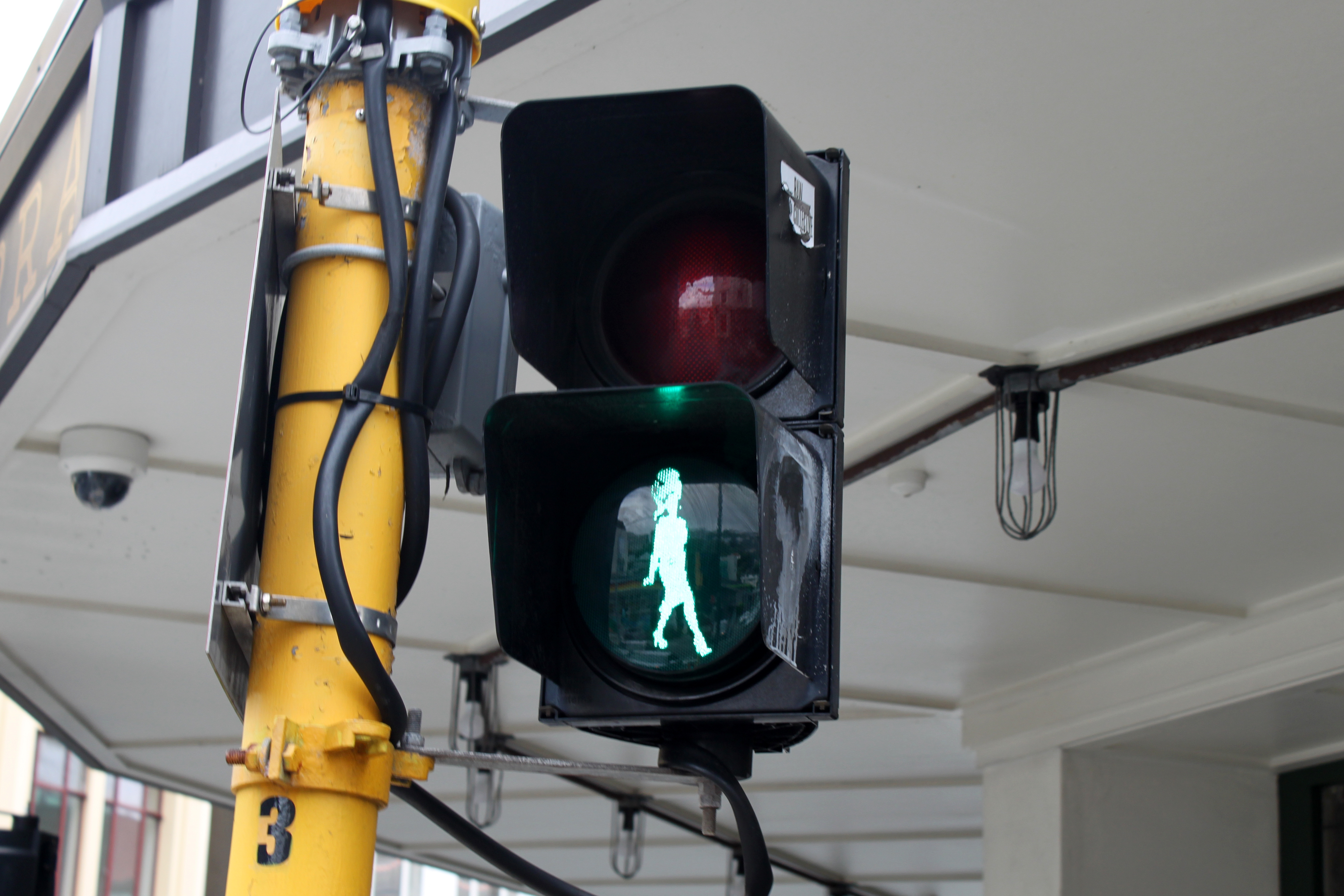
A green pedestrian light depicting Rupe on Cuba Street, Wellington

Rupe has been cited as a role model by MP Georgina Beyer, the world's first openly transgender Member of Parliament. Long-time friend and former Grey District councillor Jacquie Grant wrote a tribute for Rupe and at her tangi delivered a eulogy.

In a tribute, the Lord Mayor of Sydney, Clover Moore, stated that:

Carmen Rupe was an icon for Sydney's Transgender community and a tireless advocate for GLBT rights. She was a quiet achiever who spent decades as a volunteer with many organisations who provided support to some of our cities most vulnerable people. I knew Carmen and was saddened by her passing. She will be missed by the people she touched and the community she was such a strong part of. It is heartening that, in accordance with her wishes, the Carmen Rupe Memorial Trust has been established to raise awareness of some of the issues faced by our GLBT community. This is a fitting tribute to someone who dedicated so much of their life to helping others.

Former Wellington Mayor Celia Wade-Brown, stated support for erecting a statue of Rupe in Wellington: "I admired her strength in living her life on her terms and standing up against discrimination."

Four sets of traffic lights along Cuba Street, Wellington are fitted with green pedestrian lights depicting Rupe. The lights were installed in August 2016 to coincide with the 30th anniversary of the Homosexual Law Reform Act.

In 2020, the short film GURL was released based on Rupe's life. The short film was a prequel to the feature film The Book of Carmen, which is currently in pre-production. The film was directed, produced and written by Mika X.
