= Brady Peeti =

New Zealand actor

- Born: Whanganui, New Zealand
- Occupation: Actor

Brady Peeti is a New Zealand actor. Born in Whanganui, Aotearoa New Zealand, Peeti is of Ngāti Maniapoto and Te Ati Haunui-a-Pāpārangi descent. She acts in theatre, film, and television.

== Early life ==
Peeti was born in Whanganui and spent part of her childhood in Timaru. She affiliates with Ngāti Maniapoto and Te Ati Haunui-a-Pāpārangi. Peeti studied musical theatre at the National Academy of Singing and Dramatic Art in Christchurch.

== Theatre career ==
Peeti has appeared in stage productions in New Zealand and Australia, including Little Shop of Horrors, Black Ties, Astroman, The Wizard of Ōtāhuhu, and Rent. She performed the role of Lucy in Jekyll & Hyde at the Hayes Theatre in Sydney. She has also produced a one-woman rock theatre show titled What Happened to Mary-Anne?.

== Film and television ==
Peeti has appeared in the television series Happiness, Ahikāroa, and the feature film Kōkā. She is the host of the documentary series TransGenerations, an eight-part series documenting the lives of transgender New Zealanders across generations.

== Awards ==
- Outstanding Newcomer Award – Auckland Theatre Awards (2019)
