= Heremia Te Wake =

Heremia Te Wake (c. 1838 – 29 November 1918) was a New Zealand tribal leader, farmer, assessor and catechist. Of Māori descent, he identified with the Te Rarawa iwi. He was born in Te Karaka, Northland, New Zealand. His daughter, land activist Whina Cooper, would help him in his work.

He was deeply committed to the Catholic Church. He was a catechist who instructed the young and led services when clergy were absent. He died of influenza during the global 1918 flu pandemic.
