= List of non-binary people =

Non-binary people are individuals that hold a gender identity outside of the gender binary. Non-binary gender identities may include genderfluid, agender, and bigender. Additionally, some cultures may have "third gender" roles that exist outside of the gender binary.

== Non-binary people ==
List of people, with name, birth year, nationality, gender identity and reference shown
Name	Lifespan	Nationality	Gender identity	Occupation(s)	Reference
Abadon	Unknown (living)	American	Non-binary	Professional wrestler	
Avie Acosta	1996 or 1997–	American	Gender non-conforming	Model	
Courtney Act	1982–	Australian	Genderqueer	Drag queen, singer, television personality	
Adeem the Artist	1988–	American	Non-binary	Singer-songwriter	
Travis Alabanza	1996–	British	Gender non-conforming	Performance artist, poet, writer, LGBTQ rights activist	
Ian Alexander	2001–	American	Non-binary	Actor	
K Alexander	1992–	Canadian	Non-binary	Actor, writer, web series creator, YouTube personality	
Olly Alexander	1990–	English	Non-binary	Singer, songwriter, actor, activist	
Amadour	1995–	American	Non-binary	Artist, musician, writer	
Taylor Alxndr	1993–	American	Non-binary	Music artist, drag queen, activist	
Qween Amor	1989–	American	Trans-queer	Erotic dancer	
Ser Anzoategui	1979–	American	Non-binary	Actor (Best Supporting Actor nominee at the Imagen Awards)	
Arca	1989–	Venezuelan	Non-binary, transgender	Record producer, singer	
Uzoma Asagwara	1984–	Canadian	Genderqueer	Politician	
Zaiba Baig	1995–	Canadian	Genderfluid	Playwright, actor	
Leo Baker	1991–	American	Non-binary and genderqueer	Professional skateboarder	
Ruth Baldacchino	1979–	Maltese	Non-binary	LGBT, intersex human rights activist	
Kevin Barnes	1974–	American	Non-binary, genderqueer	Singer-songwriter, musician	
Bambie Thug	1993–	Irish	Non-binary	Singer-songwriter, Irish representative at the Eurovision Song Contest 2024	
Blu del Barrio	1997–	American	Non-binary	Actor	
Meg-John Barker	1974–	British	Plural/non-binary	Author, speaker, consultant, activist	
Thomas Baty	1869–1954	British	Transgender, non-binary	Lawyer, writer, editor of the feminist gender studies journal Urania	
B-Complex	1984–	Slovak	Bigender	Music producer, DJ	
Sadie Benning	1973–	American	Transgender, non-binary	Artist, musician	
Sibylle Berg	1962–	German–Swiss	Non-binary	Author, playwright, politician	
Morgan Berry	Unknown (living)	American	Non-binary	Voice actor	
Riley Black	Unknown (living)	American	Transgender, non-binary	Paleontologist	
Mal Blum	1988–	American	Non-binary	Musician, singer	
Bob the Drag Queen	1986–	American	Non-binary	Drag queen, comedian	
Justin Vivian Bond	1963–	American	Transgender	Singer-songwriter, drag queen	
Kate Bornstein	1948–	American	Gender non-conforming	Author, playwright, performance artist, gender theorist	
Pandora Boxx	1972–	American	Genderfluid	Drag queen, television personality	
Tony Briffa	1969–	Maltese-Australian	Non-binary	First known intersex mayor, intersex activist, educator	
Ria Brodell	Unknown (living)	American	Non-binary, transgender	Artist, educator, author	
KB Brookins	1995–	American	Non-binary, transgender	Author	
River Butcher	1982–	American	Non-binary, transmasculine	Stand-up comic, actor, writer	
Judith Butler	1956–	American	Non-binary	Philosopher, gender theorist	
Claude Cahun	1894–1954	French	Neuter	Artist in the surrealist movement. Photographer, writer, sculptor.	
Gabrielle Calvocoressi	1974–	American	Non-binary	Poet, professor	
Phoebe Campbell	1997–	English	Non-binary	Actor	
Anna-Varney Cantodea	1952–	German	Genderqueer	Musician, singer-songwriter	
Neko Case	1970–	American	Genderfluid	Singer-songwriter	
Nicky Case	1994–	Canadian	Genderqueer and non-binary	Independent video game developer	
Cassils	1975–	Canadian	Gender non-conforming	Performance artist	
Charlie Cawood	1988–	English	Non-binary man	Musician, composer	
Violet Chachki	1992–	American	Genderfluid	Drag queen, model, television personality	
Jonathan Lyndon Chase	1989–	American	Non-binary	Visual artist	
El Chaston	2002–	Australian	Non-binary	Australian rules footballer	
Lana Chornohorska	1999–2026	Ukrainian	Non-binary	Journalist, artist, activist, soldier	
Jen Cloher	1973–	Australian	Non-binary	Singer, songwriter, record producer	
Ellar Coltrane	1994–	American	(Note: While Coltrane hasn't explicitly identified with any non-binary identities, they said in the reference: "I'm not really a man[.] ... There are definitely people who are men through and through, and that's awesome, but for me the binary gender demarcation always has felt just kind of like … a charade, like this character that I have to play", signalling an identity outside of the gender binary.)	Actor, model	
Emma Corrin	1995–	English	Non-binary	Actor	
Estefan Cortes-Vargas	1991–	Canadian	Non-binary	Politician	
Shea Couleé	1989–	American	Non-binary	Drag queen, musician, television personality	
Ivan Coyote	1969–	Canadian	Non-binary	Writer. Won multiple ReLit and Stonewall Book Awards.	
Max Crumm	1985–	American	Non-binary	Actor, singer	
Miley Cyrus	1992–	American	Genderfluid	Singer, songwriter, actor	
Emma D'Arcy	1992–	English	Non-binary	Actor	
Brihony Dawson	1984–	Australian	Non-binary	Television presenter, singer	
Kimya Dawson	1972–	American	Non-binary	Singer-songwriter	
Anuna De Wever	2001–	Belgian	Non-binary	Climate activist	
Adore Delano	1989–	American	Non-binary	Singer, songwriter, drag queen, television personality	
Cara Delevingne	1992–	British	Genderfluid	Model, actor	
Asia Kate Dillon	1984–	American	Non-binary	Actor	
Harry Dodge	1966–	American	(Note: Per the references, Dodge identifies as a butch, but has also repeatedly expressed a disinterest in adopting any other gender designations or labels.)	Sculptor, performer, video artist, professor, writer	
Rain Dove	1989–	American	Non-binary	Model, actor, activist	
Dreamcrusher	Unknown (living)	American	Non-binary	Musician	
Emma Dumont	1994–	American	Non-binary, transmasculine	Actor, model, dancer	
Cyrus Grace Dunham	1992–	American	Non-binary, transmasculine	Writer, actor, activist	
Gabe Dunn	1988–	American	Non-binary	Actor, writer, journalist, podcaster	
Kizzy Edgell	2002–	English	Non-binary, transmasculine, queer	Actor	
Jan J. Eldridge	Unknown (living)	New Zealander	Non-binary	Theoretical astrophysicist	
Dorian Electra	1992–	American	Genderfluid	Singer, songwriter, video, performance artist	
Dominick Evans	1980–	Polish-American	Non-binary	Filmmaker, activist	
F1NN5TER	2000–	English	Genderfluid	Twitch streamer and YouTuber	
Miss Fame	1985–	American	Genderfluid	Drag queen, makeup artist, model, television personality	
Florian-Ayala Fauna	1991–	American	Androgyne	Artist, musician, music producer	
E.R. Fightmaster	1992–	American	Non-binary	Actor, producer, writer	
G Flip	1994–	Australian	Non-binary	Singer, songwriter, record producer, drummer, and musician	
Che Flores	1979–	American	Non-binary	National Basketball Association referee	
Shatara Michelle Ford	Unknown (living)	American	Non-binary	Director, writer, producer	
Tyler Ford	1990–	American	Agender	Writer, public speaker	
Hannah Gadsby	1978–	Australian	Genderqueer	Comedian, writer, actor	
Sarah Gailey	Unknown (living)	American	Non-binary	Writer	
River Gallo	1990/1991–	Salvadoran-American	Genderqueer	Filmmaker, actor, model, activist	
Masha Gessen	1967–	Russian-American	Non-binary	Journalist, author, translator	
Nats Getty	1992–	American	Non-binary	Model, designer, socialite and activist	
J. Harrison Ghee	1989–	American	Non-binary	Actor, dancer	
Melanie Gillman	Unknown (living)	American	Non-binary	Cartoonist	
Alex Gino	1977–	American	Genderqueer	Children's book writer	
Flora Gionest-Roussy	1995–	Canadian	Non-binary, trans woman	Actor, singer, drag queen	
Ilana Glazer	1987–	American	Non-binary	Comedian, actor, writer, producer, director, activist	
Gigi Goode	1997–	American	Genderfluid	Drag queen, television personality	
Celia Rose Gooding	2000–	American	Non-binary	Actor	
Tylan Grant	2001–	British	Non-binary	Actor	
Olive Gray	1994–	British	Non-binary	Actor	
Grey Gritt	Unknown (living)	Canadian	Non-binary	Musician	
Gloria Groove	1995–	Brazilian	Genderfluid	Singer and rapper	
Tori Groves-Little	2000–	Australian	Non-binary	Australian rules footballer	
Sofie Hagen	1988–	Danish	Non-binary	Comedian, author, podcaster, fashion designer, fat acceptance campaigner	
Edith Hammar	1992–	Finnish	Non-binary	Artist and illustrator	
Eleanor Hardwick	1993–	British	Non-binary	Photographer, musician	
Jack Haven	1994–	American	Non-binary	Actor	
Angel Haze	1991–	American	Agender	Rapper, lyricist	
Johanna Hedva	1982–	Korean-American	Genderqueer	Artist and author in disability studies	
Liv Hewson	1995–	Australian	Non-binary	Actor, playwright	
Nikki Hiltz	1994–	American	Non-binary	Mid-distance runner	
Lann Hornscheidt	1965–	German	Non-binary	Academic	
Beth Jeans Houghton	1990–	English	Non-binary	Musician, artist, animator	
Jana Hunter	1979–	American	Genderfluid	Songwriter, musician	
Owen Hurcum	1997–	Welsh	Genderqueer, agender	Mayor of Bangor City Council (elected 2021). World's first openly non-binary mayor and Wales' youngest ever mayor.	
Imbi the Girl	1997–	Australian	Non-binary	Singer-songwriter, rapper, poet	
Eddie Izzard	1962–	British	Transgender, genderfluid	Comedian, actor, writer	
Andre J.	1969–	American	Genderless	Party promoter	
Carly Jackson	1997–	Canadian	Non-binary	Professional ice hockey goaltender, actor	
Cris Judar	1971–	Brazilian	Non-binary	Writer	
Jennie June	1874–unknown	American	Androgyne, invert, urning, fairie	Law clerk, activist	
Molly Kearney	1992–	American	Non-binary	Actor, comedian	
Kehlani	1995–	American	Non-binary	Singer-songwriter, dancer	
Jesse James Keitel	1993–	American	Non-binary	Actor	
Kindness	1982–	English	Gender non-conforming	Singer-songwriter, musician	
Diana King	1970–	Jamaican	Non-binary	Singer-songwriter	
Maia Kobabe	1991–	American	Genderqueer	Cartoonist	
Akiyama Kokona	2005-	Japanese	Non-binary, transmasculine	Rapper	
Janae Kroc	1972–	American	Genderfluid	Author, bodybuilder, marine, model, pharmacist, powerlifter	
Kim de l'Horizon	1992–	Swiss	Non-binary	Writer, thespian	
Lisa Lachance	Unknown (living)	Canadian	Genderqueer	Politician	
Robyn Lambird	1997–	Australian	Non-binary	Wheelchair racer, model	
Timothy LeDuc	1990	American	Non-binary	Pair skater	
Haruna Lee	1985	Japanese-American	Non-binary	Playwright, actor	
Jiz Lee	1980	American	Genderqueer	Pornographic actor	
Left at London	1996–	American	Non-binary, trans woman	Singer-songwriter, producer, comedian, internet personality	
R. B. Lemberg	1976–	Ukrainian-American	Bigender	Writer, poet, editor, professor	
Jesse Leigh	Unknown (living)	American	Non-binary	Actor	
CN Lester	1984–	British	Genderqueer	Singer-songwriter	
Jessie Mei Li	1995–	English	Gender non-conforming	Actor	
Demi Lovato	1992–	American	Non-binary	Singer, actor	
LP	1981–	American	Gender-neutral	Singer-songwriter	
Tilly Lucas-Rodd	1996–	Australian	Non-binary	Australian rules footballer	
Helen Macdonald	1970–	English	Non-binary	Writer, naturalist	
Alex MacFarlane	1955–	Australian	Androgynous	First person known with an 'X' sex marker on passport	
Ange Madame	Unknown (living)	South African	Non-binary, queer	Producer, rapper, vocalist, performance artist	
Robert Madge	1996–	English	Non-binary	Actor	
Gopi Shankar Madurai	1991–	Indian	Genderqueer	Writer, speaker, politician, equal rights activist, recipient of The Commonwealth Award	
Honey Mahogany	1983–	American	Gender non-conforming	Activist, politician, drag performer, singer	
Keith Maillard	1942–	Canadian-American	Non-binary	Novelist, poet, professor	
James Majoos	Unknown (living)	Australian	Non-binary	Actor	
Jin Maley	1986–	American	Non-binary	Actor	
Chella Man	1998–	American	Queer	Actor, model, artist, YouTuber, activist	
Bertrand Mandico	1971–	French	Non-binary, agender, xenogender (Note: Per the references, Mandico has used all three of these terms to describe themselves and uses both male and female pronouns.)	Film director, screenwriter	
Kelly Mantle	1976–	American	Genderfluid	Drag queen, actor, television personality	
Toby Marlow	1994–	British	Non-binary	Co-creator of Six, composer, writer, actor	
Chanty Marostica	Unknown (living)	Canadian	Non-binary, transgender	Comedian	
Jeffrey Marsh	1977–	American	Genderqueer	Vine and social media activist	
Mae Martin	1987–	Canadian	Non-binary	Comedian, actor, screenwriter	
Jess McAvoy	1980–	Australian	Non-binary	Performing artist, songwriter, musician	
Gerard McCarthy	1981–	Irish	Non-binary	Actor	
Rose McGowan	1973–	American	Non-binary	Actor, model, singer, author	
Catherine McKenney	1961–	Canadian	Non-binary	Politician	
Foz Meadows	1986–	Australian	Genderqueer	Writer (Hugo Award winning novelist and blogger)	
Bobbi Salvör Menuez	1993–	American	Non-binary, transgender	Actor, model	
Bethany C. Meyers	1990–	American	Non-binary	Fitness entrepreneur	
Bunny Michael	1982/1983–	American	Non-binary	Visual artist, musician, rapper	
Malka Mikkelsen	1973–	Colombian-American	Non-binary	Video artist and musician featured in the film Spirits in the Forest	
Myst Milano	Unknown (living)	Canadian	Non-binary	Rapper and DJ	
Ezra Miller	1992–	American	Queer, genderfluid	Actor, singer	
sj Miller	1970–	American	Agender	Academic and social justice activist	
Ad Minoliti	1980–	Argentinian	Non-binary	Visual artist	
John Cameron Mitchell	1963–	American	Non-binary	Actor, playwright, screenwriter, singer, songwriter, producer, director	
Mani Mitchell	1953–	New Zealander	Intersex, non-binary	Intersex activist, educator	
Janelle Monáe	1985–	American	Non-binary	Singer-songwriter, actor, record producer	
Jack Monroe	1988–	British	Non-binary transgender	Journalist	
Jinkx Monsoon	1987–	American	Genderfluid	Drag queen, television personality	
Montaigne	1995–	Australian	Non-binary	Musician, singer, streamer	
Rose Montoya	1995–	American	Non-binary, trans woman	Model, content creator, activist	.
Indya Moore	1995–	American	Non-binary	Actor, model	
Aries Moross	Unknown (living)	English	Non-binary	Graphic designer, illustrator, artist	
Grant Morrison	1960–	Scottish	Genderqueer	Comic book writer, playwright	
Evelyn Morris	Unknown (living)	Australian	Non-binary	Singer-songwriter	
Zanele Muholi	1972–	South African	Non-binary	Visual artist, photographer	
Ali K. Mulford	Unknown (living)	Australian	Non-binary	Writer	
Shakina Nayfack	1980–	American	Gender non-conforming, trans woman, non-binary	Actress, activist	
Nemo	1999–	Swiss	Non-binary	Singer, rapper, winner of the Eurovision Song Contest 2024	
Skatune Network	1995–	American	Non-binary	YouTuber, musician, composer, music educator, trombonist	
Shain Neumeier	1987–	American	Non-binary	Attorney and activist	
Alex Newell	1992–	American	Gender nonconforming	Singer, actor	
Rhys Nicholson	1990–	Australian	Non-binary	Comedian, actor	
Marieke Nijkamp	1986–	Dutch	Non-binary	Writer	
Norrie	1962–	Scottish-Australian	Androgynous	Activist and political cartoonist	
Richard O'Brien	1942–	English-New Zealander	Transgender, Genderqueer	Writer, actor, television presenter, theatre performer	
Lauren O'Connell	1988–	American	Genderqueer	Singer-songwriter, musician	
Celeste O'Connor	1998–	American; born in Kenya	Non-binary	Actor	
Saoi O'Connor	Unknown (living)	Irish	Transgender, non-binary	Climate activist, writer	
Eureka O'Hara	1990–	American	Genderfluid, gender-neutral, trans woman	Drag queen, television personality	
Andrew O'Neill	1979–	British	Non-binary	Comedian, musician, writer	
AJ Odasso	1981–	American	Intersex, non-binary	Writer, poet	
Olek	1978–	Polish	Non-binary	Artist	
Tamsin Omond	1984–	British	Non-binary	Activist, author, journalist, politician	
Kay O'Neill	Unknown (living)	New Zealander	Non-binary	Illustrator and writer	
Vico Ortiz	1991–	Puerto Rican	Non-binary	Actor, drag king and activist	
Genesis P-Orridge	1950–2020	British	Pandrogyne	Singer-songwriter, musician, poet, writer, performance artist	
Elliot Page	1987–	Canadian	Transgender, non-binary, queer	Actor, producer	
Pidgeon Pagonis	1986–	American	Non-binary	Intersex human rights activist	
V Pappas	1978/1979–	Australian-American	Woman, non-binary	Businessperson, former COO of TikTok	
Mason Alexander Park	1995–	American	Non-binary	Actor	
Bárbara Paz	1974–	Brazilian	Non-binary, bigender	Actress, producer, model, and film director	
A. W. Peet	1968–	New Zealander, Canadian	Non-binary	Physicist (string theory and quantum gravity), professor	
Leah Lakshmi Piepzna-Samarasinha	1975–	Canadian-American	Non-binary, femme	Poet, writer, educator, social activist	
Everest Pipkin	Unknown (living)	American	Non-binary, transgender	Software artist, writer, game designer	
Planningtorock	1972–	British	Genderqueer	Musician	
Devon Price	1988–	American	Non-binary	Social psychologist, blogger, author	
Paperboy Prince	1992/1993–	American	Non-binary	Artist, community activist, politician	
King Princess	1998–	American	Genderqueer	Musician, singer-songwriter	
Public Universal Friend	1752–1819	American	Genderless	Quaker preacher, proponent of abolition and sexual abstinence	
Chris Pureka	1979–	American	Genderqueer	Singer-songwriter	
Frances Quinlan	1986–	American	Non-binary	Singer-songwriter	
Quinn	1995–	Canadian	Nonbinary, transgender	Professional soccer player, Olympic gold medallist	
Zoë Quinn	1987–	American	Not-cisgender	Video game developer	
Sara Ramirez	1975–	Mexican-American	Nonbinary, genderqueer, bisexual	Actor	
Bella Ramsey	2003–	British	Genderfluid	Actor	
Amy Ray	1964–	American	Genderqueer	Singer-songwriter, member of Indigo Girls, founder of Daemon Records	
Omar van Reenen	1996–	Namibian	Nonbinary	LGBTQ rights activist	
Jane Remover	2003–	American	Non-binary	Musician	
Roque Salas Rivera	1985–	Puerto Rican	Nonbinary	Poet	
L. J. Roberts	1980–	American	Genderqueer	Textile artist	
Megan Rohrer	1980–	American	Transgender	Pastor, activist	
Michelle Rojas	1987–	American	Non-binary	Voice actress	
Antonina Romanova	1985–	Ukrainian	Non-binary	Director, performer, actress, playwright, activist, soldier	
Katherine Magdalene Rose	Unknown (living)	American	Non-binary	Author, activist	
Ruby Rose	1986–	Australian	Genderfluid	Model, actor, singer, television presenter	
Roxen	2000–	Romanian	Non-binary	Singer	
Rykka	1986–	Swiss-Canadian	Non-binary	Singer and songwriter, Swiss representative at the Eurovision Song Contest 2016	
Dua Saleh	1994–	Sudanese-American	Non-binary	Singer and actor	
Marianna Salzmann	1985–	German	Non-binary	Playwright, essayist, novelist	
JD Samson	1978–	American	Genderqueer, non-binary, gender non-conforming	Musician	
Patruni Sastry	1992–	Indian	Non-binary	Dancer, performance artist, visual artist, model, drag queen	
Jane Schoenbrun	1987–	American	Non-binary, transfeminine	Filmmaker	
Daniel Sea	1973–	American	Non-binary, transgender	Actor, musician	
Konkona Sen Sharma	1979–	Indian	Gender-neutral	Actress, filmmaker	
Shamir	1994–	American	Non-binary	Singer-songwriter	
Ryan Simpkins	1998–	American	Non-binary	Actor	
Sin Wai Kin	1991–	Canadian	Non-binary	Visual artist, drag performer	
Jim Sinclair	Unknown (living)	American	Neuter	Activist, co-founder of Autism Network International	
Indianarae Siqueira	1971 –	Brazilian	Tranvestigênere	Activist, founder of CasaNem and PreparaNem	
SMITH	1985–	French		Artist, film-maker	
Alana Smith	2000–	American	Non-binary	Professional skateboarder	
Sam Smith	1992–	British	Non-binary, genderqueer	Singer	
Joey Soloway	1965–	American	Non-binary, gender non-conforming	Writer, director, producer	
SonicFox	1998–	American	Non-binary	Professional esports player	
Rae Spoon	1982–	Canadian		Musician, writer	
Amandla Stenberg	1998–	American	Non-binary	Actor	
James Stephanie Sterling	1984–	English-American	Non-binary, transgender	Video game critic, web video producer, livestreamer, professional wrestler	
J Stevens	Unknown (living)	Canadian	Non-binary	Cinematographer, director and co-creator of the comedy series Slo Pitch.	
ND Stevenson	1991–	American	Non-binary	Creator of She-Ra and the Princesses of Power and Nimona, writer, animator.	
Courtney Stodden	1994–	American	Non-binary	Media personality, model, singer, songwriter	
Alyson Stoner	1993–	American	Queer	Actor, singer, dancer	
Maria Strong	1971–	Australian	Non-binary	Athlete	
Rebecca Sugar	1987–	American	Non-binary	Animator, director, screenwriter, producer, songwriter	
Emma Sulkowicz	1992–	American	Non-binary	Performance artist, anti-rape activist	
Tash Sultana	1995–	Australian	Non-binary	Musician, singer-songwriter, multi-instrumentalist	
Eliot Sumner	1990–	British	Genderfluid	Musician, singer-songwriter	
Quintessa Swindell	1997–	American	Non-binary	Actor	
Mattilda Bernstein Sycamore	1973–	American	Genderqueer	Author, activist	
Bogi Takács	1983–	American; born in Hungary	Agender	Writer, psycholinguist, editor	
Audrey Tang	1981–	Taiwanese	Non-binary, post-gender	Politician, software programmer	
Bex Taylor-Klaus	1994–	American	Non-binary	Actor	
Kae Tempest	1985–	British	Non-binary	Poet	
Zoe Terakes	Unknown (living)	Australian	Non-binary, transmasculine	Actor	
Damian Terriquez	1998–	American	Non-binary	Actor, activist, philanthropist	
The Blessed Madonna	1977–	American	Non-binary	DJ, producer, musician	
T. Thomason	1994–	Canadian	Non-binary	Singer-songwriter	
JayR Tinaco	1989–	Australian	Non-binary	Actor	
Orla Tinsley	1987–	Irish	Non-binary	Journalist, campaigner	
Lio Tipton	1988–	American	Non-binary	Actor, fashion model	
Jacob Tobia	1991–	American	Genderqueer	Writer, activist	
Émile P. Torres	1982–	American	Non-binary	Philosopher, intellectual historian, author, activist, postdoctoral researcher, co-coiner of TESCREAL	
Nico Tortorella	1988–	American	Gender fluid	Actor, model	
Stephen Trask	1966–	American	Non-binary	Musician, composer	
Trinity the Tuck	1984–	American	Transgender, non-binary	Drag queen, musician	
Mauree Turner	1992/1993–	American	Non-binary	Politician	
Amaka Umeh	Unknown (living)	Nigerian	Genderfluid	Actor	
Carly Usdin	1982–	American	Non-binary	Filmmaker, writer	
Hikaru Utada	1983–	Japanese-American	Non-binary	Singer / songwriter	
Alok Vaid-Menon	1991–	American	Non-binary	Spoken word performance	
Jonathan Van Ness	1987–	American	Non-binary, genderqueer	Hairdresser, podcaster, television personality	
Jo Vannicola	1968–	Canadian	Non-binary	Actor, writer	
Sasha Velour	1987–	American	Non-binary	Drag queen, television personality	
Max Vernon	1988–	American	Non-binary, genderfluid, gender variant (Note: Per the references, Vernon has used all three of these terms to describe themselves.)	Performer, songwriter, playwright	
Lil Uzi Vert	1994–	American	Gender non-conforming	Rapper, singer, songwriter	
Darcy Vescio	1993–	Australian	Non-binary	Australian rules footballer	
Hida Viloria	1968–	American	Genderfluid	Writer, author, producer, LGBTI activist	
Vice Ganda	1976–	Filipino	Non-binary	Actor and comedian	
D. W. Waterson	Unknown (living)	Canadian	Non-binary	DJ, drummer, writer, director, web series creator	
Lachlan Watson	2001–	American	Genderqueer	Actor	
Julia Weldon	1983–	American	Non-binary	Singer, actor	
Alex White	1981–	American	Non-binary	Author	
Sage Ni'Ja Whitson	Unknown (living)	American	Gender non-conforming, non-binary	Artist, performer, writer	
Gigi Raven Wilbur	1955–	American	Intersex, hermaphrodite, third gender, ladyboy	Writer, activist, cocreator of Celebrate Bisexuality Day	
Kristyn Wong-Tam	1971–	Canadian	Non-binary	Politician	
Dorian Wood	1975–	American	Genderfluid	Singer, composer, performance artist, visual artist, writer	
James Wylder	1989–	American	Non-binary	Author, publisher	
Celeste Yim	1996–	Korean Canadian	Non-binary	Comedian, writer	
Yeule	1997–	Singaporean	Non-binary	Singer, songwriter, and producer	
Reuben Zellman	1979–	American	Non-binary	Rabbi, musician	
Nevo Zisin	1996–	Australian	Non-binary	Writer, activist	
Dana Zzyym	1958–	American	Non-binary	Intersex human rights activist	
Prentis Hemphill	Unknown (living)	American	Genderqueer	author, therapist, and somatic practitioner	
Obioma Chukwuike	Unknown (living)	Nigerian	Non-binary	Nigerian intersex and non-binary activist	
Raegan Revord	2008-	American	Non-binary	Actor, novelist	
Elio Mei	2002-	American	Genderqueer	Singer-songwriter	
S. M. Rodriguez	Unknown (living)	American	non-binary	Scholar-activist, author, anti-violence community organiser	
Matheusa Passareli	1997–2018	Brazilian	Non-binary	Visual artist and LGBTQ activist	

== Third gender and indigenous people ==
The term "third gender" has been used to describe hijras of India, Bangladesh and Pakistan who have gained legal identity, fa'afafine of Polynesia, and sworn virgins of the Balkans, among others, and is also used by many of such groups and individuals to describe themselves.

Name	Lifespan	Nation/Ethnicity	Gender identity	Occupation(s)	Reference
Marjorie Beaucage	1947–	Métis	Two-spirit	Filmmaker and teacher	
Alec Butler	1959–	Mi'kmaq	Two-spirit	Playwright and filmmaker	
Parinya Charoenphol	1981–	Thai	Kathoey	Muay Thai boxer	
Chrystos	1946–	Menominee	Two-spirit	Poet and activist	
Edward Cowley	Unknown (living)	Samoan	Fa'afafine	Entertainer	
Waawaate Fobister	Unknown (living)	Anishinaabe	Two-spirit	Playwright and actor	
Ketty Gabriele	1981–	Italian	Femminiello	Mafia figure	
Lily Gladstone	1986–	Piegan Blackfeet	Middle-gendered	Actress	
Yuhki Kamatani	1983–	Japanese	X-gender	Manga writer, illustrator	
Shigeyuki Kihara	1975–	Japanese–Samoan	Fa'afafine	Contemporary artist	
Richard LaFortune	1960–	Yup'ik	Two-Spirit	Author, activist	
Shaneel Lal	2000–	Girmitiya–Fijian	Vakasalewalewa, hijra, non-binary	Activist, model	
Marion Malena	Unknown (living)	Samoan	Fa'afafine	Beauty pageant	
Shabnam Mausi	Unknown (living)	Indian	Hijra	First hijra in India elected to public office	
Kent Monkman	1965–	Cree	Two-Spirit	Artist	
Osh-Tisch	1854–unknown	Crow Nation	Badé	Activist	
Fuimaono Karl Pulotu-Endemann	Unknown (living)	Samoan	Fa'afafine	Medical professional	
Kali Reis	1986–	Wompanoag–Cape Verdean	Two-spirit	Boxer and actor	
A. Revathi	Unknown (living)	Tamil	Hijra	Writer and actor	
Jaiyah Saelua	1988–	Samoan	Fa'afafine	Association football player	
jaye simpson	1994/1995–	Oji-Cree–Saulteaux	Two-spirit	Writer, poet, activist, drag queen	
Tanwarin Sukkhapisit	1973–	Thai	Kathoey, non-binary	Filmmaker, politician	
Laxmi Narayan Tripathi	1979–	Indian	Hijra	Actor, dancer, and transgender rights activist	
Yuu Watase	1970–	Japanese	X-gender	Manga writer	
We'wha	1849–1896	Zuni	Lhamana	Zuni Native American	
Joshua Whitehead	1989–	Oji-Cree	Two-Spirit	Author	
Massey Whiteknife	Unknown (living)	Cree	Two-spirit	Businessman and entertainer	
Hinaleimoana Wong-Kalu	1972–	Hawaiian	Māhū	Dance teacher	
Jeneen Frei Njootli	1988–	Gwichʼin	Two-Spirit	Artist	

== See also ==
- List of non-binary writers
- List of fictional non-binary characters
- List of transgender people
- List of intersex people
- List of androgynous people
- List of gender identities
