= List of non-binary writers =

Non-binary writers are individuals who write for a living and hold a gender identity outside of the gender binary. Non-binary gender identities may include genderfluid, agender, and bigender. Additionally, some cultures may have "third gender" roles that exist outside of the gender binary.

== A ==
- Travis Alabanza, an English performance artist, poet, writer, and LGBTQ rights activist
- K Alexander, a Canadian actor, writer, web series creator and YouTube personality

== B ==
- Thomas Baty (1869–1954), an English lawyer and writer of a utopian science fiction novel set in a postgender society, as well as the editor of the feminist gender studies journal Urania
- Jay Bernard, a Black British poet, multi media writer and film maker, shortlisted in the Costa Book Awards 2019
- Tess Berry-Hart, a British playwright, author and activist
- Mal Blum, an American songwriter, musician, writer and performer
- Justin Vivian Bond, an American singer-songwriter, author, painter, performance artist, and actor
- Kate Bornstein, an American author, playwright, performance artist, and gender theorist
- Beth Brant, a Mohawk writer, essayist, and poet
- Ly Xīnzhèn M. Zhǎngsūn Brown, an Asian American autistic disability rights activist, writer, and public speaker
- River Butcher, an American stand-up comic, actor, writer, producer, and podcast host
- Alec Butler, a Canadian playwright and filmmaker
- Judith Butler, an American philosopher, gender theorist and feminist writer
- K.R. Byggdin, a Canadian novelist

== C ==
- Claude Cahun, a Jewish-French photographer, sculptor and writer
- E.M. Carroll, a Canadian webcomic artist and author
- Marjorie Celona, an American-Canadian writer
- Chrystos, a Menominee writer and two-spirit activist
- Heather Corinna, an American sex education writer and blogger
- Ivan Coyote, a Canadian spoken word performer, writer, and LGBT advocate

== D ==
- Harry Dodge, an American sculptor, performer, video artist, and writer
- Jude Doyle, an American feminist author
- Cyrus Grace Dunham, an American writer and activist

== E ==
- Akwaeke Emezi, a Nigerian author living in the United States

== F ==
- Waawaate Fobister, a Canadian playwright and actor
- Tyler Ford, a writer and public speaker
- L. Frank, a Tongva-Acjachemen artist, writer, tribal scholar, cartoonist, and indigenous language activist

== G ==
- Sarah Gailey, an American author of speculative fiction
- Andrea Gibson, an American poet and activist

== H ==
- Johanna Hedva, author of Sick Woman Theory and On Hell
- Liv Hewson, an Australian actor and playwright

== I ==
- Eddie Izzard, a stand-up comedian, actor, writer and political activist

== J ==
- George M. Johnson
- Cris Judar, a Brazilian writer

== K ==
- Yuhki Kamatani, a Japanese manga writer and illustrator
- Maia Kobabe, a cartoonist and illustrator, author of Gender Queer: A Memoir
- Janae Kroc, a bodybuilder and writer

== L ==
- Kim de l'Horizon, Swiss writer and thespian
- Carole LaFavor, an Ojibwe novelist, activist and nurse
- Richard LaFortune, a two spirit activist, author, community organizer, and artist
- Olivia Laing, a British trans/nonbinary writer, novelist, and cultural critic
- R. B. Lemberg, a bigender, queer author, poet, and editor of speculative fiction
- Elisha Lim, an artist and graphic novelist
- Cheena Marie Lo, a poet working in Oakland, California
- Katherine Locke, a writer of young adult and children's books living in Philadelphia, PA

== M ==
- Anna-Marie McLemore, Mexican-American author
- Gopi Shankar Madurai, an Indian equal rights, Indigenous rights activist and author
- Helen Macdonald, English writer and naturalist
- Keith Maillard, a Canadian-American novelist and poet
- Jul Maroh, a French comic book writer
- Jeffrey Marsh, an American writer, actor, artist, activist, author, and social media personality
- Dan Taulapapa McMullin, an American Samoan artist, known for their poetry, visual art and film
- Casey McQuiston, an American author of romance and new adult fiction
- Foz Meadows, an Australian fantasy novelist, blogger and poet
- Jack Monroe, a British food writer and journalist
- Ali K. Mulford, Australian writer

== N ==
- Jeannette Ng, a British fantasy writer and Hugo award-winner
- Marieke Nijkamp, Dutch writer

== O ==
- Richard O'Brien, a British-New Zealand actor, television presenter, musician, writer, voice artist and theatre performer
- Kay O'Neill, New Zealand writer
- AJ Odasso, an American author, editor, and poet
- Alice Oseman, a genderfluid English YA author

== P ==
- Martin Page, a nonbinary French writer
- Pidgeon Pagonis, an intersex American activist, writer, artist, and consultant
- Chanda Prescod-Weinstein, a cosmologist, science writer and equality activist

== R ==
- Lucas Rijneveld, a Dutch writer and poet

== S ==
- Rivers Solomon, an American author
- Joey Soloway, an American television creator, showrunner, director and writer
- Rae Spoon, a Canadian musician and writer
- ND Stevenson, an American cartoonist and animation producer
- John Elizabeth Stintzi, a Canadian novelist and poet
- Rebecca Sugar, an American animator, director, screenwriter, producer, and songwriter
- Mattilda Bernstein Sycamore, an American author and activist

== T ==
- Bogi Takács, an Agender trans Jewish writer and poet
- Jacob Tobia, an American LGBTQ rights activist, feminist writer, and co-producer and host for the MSNBC television series Queer 2.0

== V ==
- Jo Vannicola, a Canadian actor and memoirist
- Hida Viloria, a Latinx American writer

== W ==
- Joshua Whitehead, a Canadian First Nations poet and novelist
- Gigi Raven Wilbur, an American bisexual rights activist and writer
- James Wylder, an American author and publisher

== Y ==
- Nao-Cola Yamazaki, a Japanese novelist and essayist
- Neon Yang, a Singaporean writer of English-language speculative fiction
- Katherine Magdalene Rose, an author and social activist from San Francisco

== Z ==
- Xiran Jay Zhao, a Chinese-Canadian author and Internet personality
- Nevo Zisin, a non-binary Australian writer and transgender rights activist

== See also ==
- List of non-binary people
- Gender in speculative fiction
