= Adaku Utah =

Nigerian artist, healer, and activist

- Born: 1983 or 1984 (age 42–43); Baltimore, Maryland, United States
- Citizenship: Nigeria, United States
- Occupations: Healer, artist, activist
- Known for: Healing justice, social change, Harriet's Apothecary
- Awards: Jessica Eve Patt Award (2012)
- Website: adakuutah.com

Adaku Utah (//) is a Nigerian-American Igbo traditional healer, speaker, writer, and artist. Her work centers on gender, reproductive justice, racial equity, youth empowerment, and healing justice movements for social change. She is the cofounder of Harriet's Apothecary, an alternative healing collective led by Black women and queer healers.

== Early life and education ==
Utah was born in Baltimore, Maryland, US but was raised in Festac Town, Lagos, Nigeria. Her father is from Abia State and her mother from Imo State. She descends from a lineage of herbalists and farmers who practiced traditional healing. As a child, she experienced chronic illness and found greater relief through herbal medicine than conventional treatments. Utah earned a BSc in Biotechnology and Psychology from Pennsylvania State University.

== Career ==
Utah is the Senior Manager of Movement Building Programs at the Building Movement Project, where she supports national convenings and leadership development for social justice organizations. She has worked with groups including the Illinois Caucus for Adolescent Health, Black Lives Matter, Black LGBTQI+ Migrant Project, The Movement for Black Lives, Yale University, Planned Parenthood, Astraea Lesbian Foundation for Justice, Black Women's Blueprint, and the Audre Lorde Project.

She is also a host and contributor to the Anti-Eugenics Project, which explores the legacy of eugenics and its impact on marginalized communities.

As a performance artist, Utah has collaborated with Decadancetheatre, and founded Soular Bliss, a creative wellness initiative. Utah is queer and resides in Brooklyn, New York.

She contributed to the anthology Healing Justice Lineages: Dreaming at the Crossroads of Liberation, Collective Care, and Safety, edited by Cara Page and Erica Woodland, alongside Prentis Hemphill.

== Recognition ==
Utah has been recognised for her contributions with several awards:

- 2012 Sexuality Leadership Development Fellowship from the Africa Regional Sexuality Resource Centre
- 2012 Center for Whole Communities Whole Thinking Fellowship
- Jessica Eve Patt Award from the Chicago Foundation for Women (2012)
- Featured nominee for Girl Tank and MTV Voices' "10,000 Names in 100 Days"

== See also ==
- Cara Page
