= Cara Page =

American healing justice practitioner

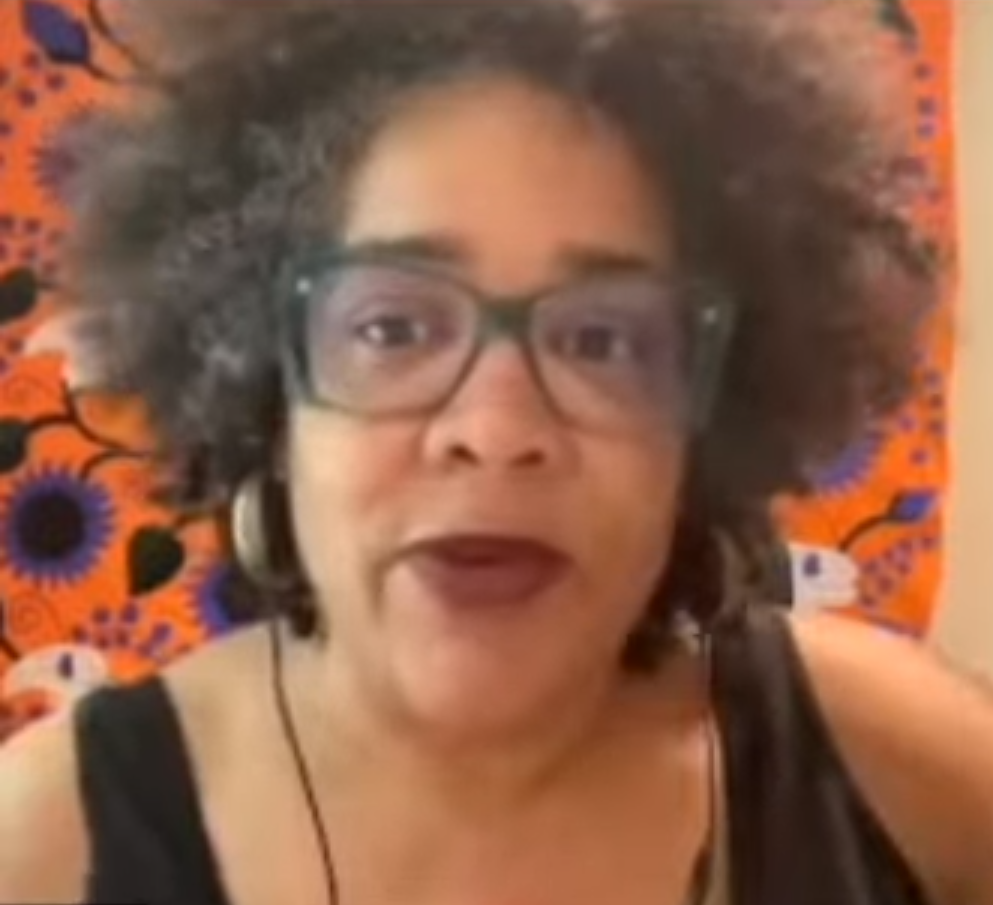
- In a 2023 video
- Citizenship: American
- Occupations: Queer feminist, cultural memory worker, healing justice practitioner
- Known for: Healing Justice Lineages: Dreaming at the Crossroads of Liberation, Collective Care, and Safety
- Website: carapage.co

Cara Page is an American queer feminist, cultural memory worker, and healing justice practitioner. She is a key figure in the healing justice movement in the United States rooted in Black feminist traditions to transform generational trauma caused by systemic oppression and structural violence. She is a co-editor of Healing Justice Lineages: Dreaming at the Crossroads of Liberation, Collective Care, and Safety, published with Erica Woodland in 2023.

== Background ==
Page grew up in a politically engaged and artistically inclined environment and became involved in organizing for racial, gender, and queer justice from a young age. Her political formation emerged through community-based and grassroots movements in the Southern United States. Her work is rooted in Black feminist, abolitionist, and Southern organizing traditions and focuses on building collective care, safety, and healing as strategies for confronting generational trauma, systemic and state violence, and harm within the medical industrial complex, in pursuit of collective liberation and social justice.

== Career ==
Page is a co-founder and co-architect of the Kindred Southern Healing Justice Collective, a Southern-based, Black feminist-led, multiracial and intergenerational network of abolitionist healers, health practitioners, cultural and birth workers working to reduce harm by interrupting generational trauma and systemic oppression through the healing justice framework. She collaborated with movements for reproductive justice, LGBTQ+ liberation, and racial equity including the Southerners on New Ground (SONG), and was the executive director of the Audre Lorde Project, where S. M. Rodriguez served in a Board of directors capacity.

== Influence ==
Through her cultural and political work, Page has helped define healing justice as a framework for collective resistance and community care. In 2023, Page co-edited Healing Justice Lineages: Dreaming at the Crossroads of Liberation, Collective Care, and Safety with Erica Woodland, published by North Atlantic Books featuring contributions from other queer healing practitioners such as Adaku Utah and Prentis Hemphill. The book traces the origins and philosophies of the healing justice framework, grounding it within Black, Indigenous, and People of Color, and Queer and Trans liberation and organizing traditions.

According to The Appeal, Page and Woodland both emphasized the importance of abolitionist models of care that exist outside the prison industrial complex, offering holistic restoration rooted in dignity and liberation. The Chicago Book Review described the anthology as a "volume much-needed amid racial, reproductive, and environmental justice movements hindered by battle scars and fatigue."

== Bibliography ==
- Healing Justice Lineages: Dreaming at the Crossroads of Liberation, Collective Care, and Safety (2023), co-edited with Erica Woodland. Published by North Atlantic Books. ISBN 978-1-62317-714-0

== See also ==
- Erica Woodland
- Prentis Hemphill
- Adaku Utah
