= Southerners On New Ground =

LGBTQ-focused social justice organization

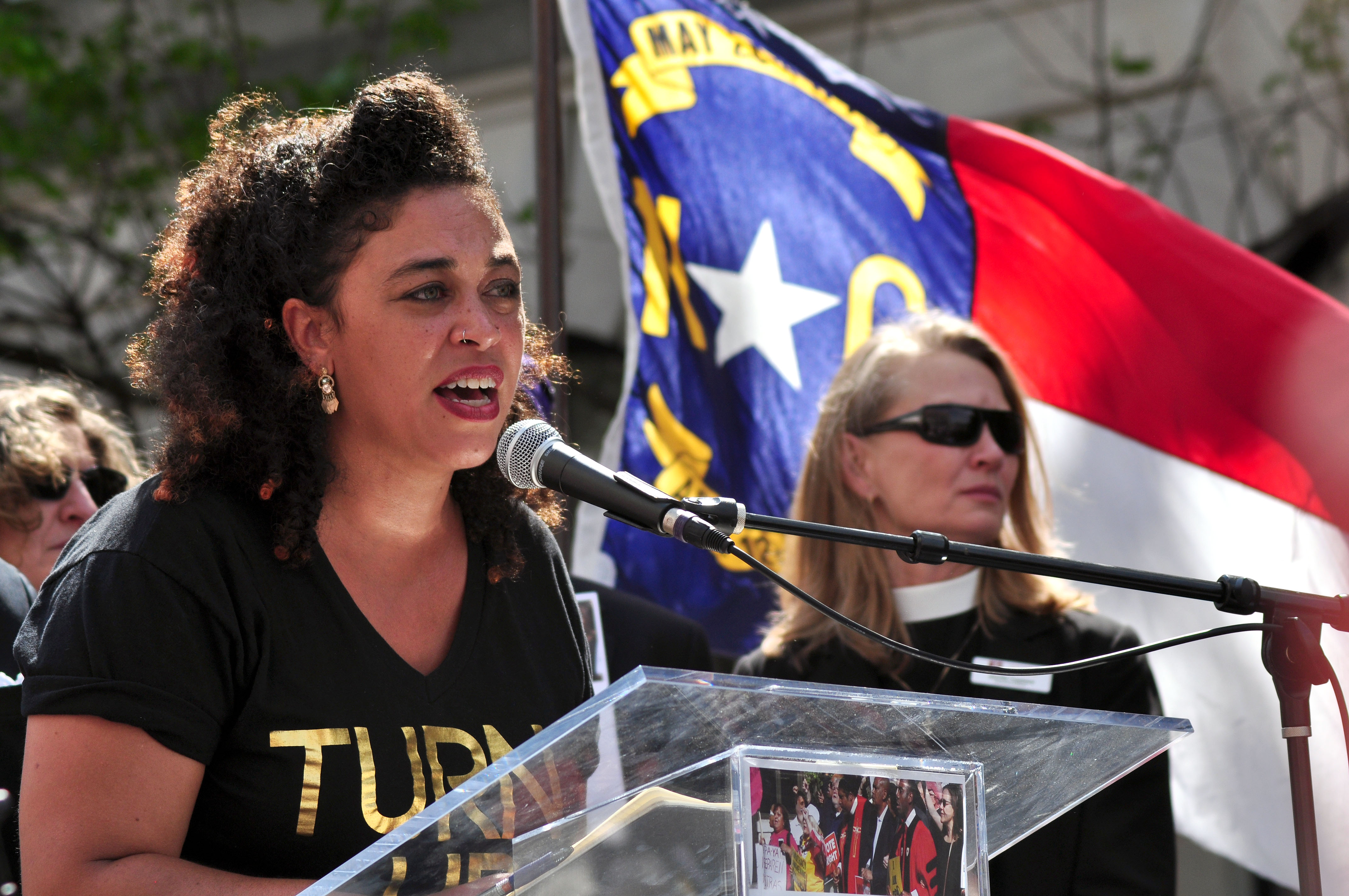
Serena Sebring of Southerners on New Ground speaks at the Moral Monday rally in Raleigh

Southerners on New Ground (commonly referred to as SONG) is a social justice, advocacy and capacity building organization serving and supporting queer and lesbian, gay, bisexual and transgender (LGBT) people, uniquely focusing its work in the southern United States through community organizing for economic and racial justice. The organization is unique, as most of the places it does work in do not have an LGBTQ organization like it.

== Mission ==
SONG values the sharing of knowledge and group work over individual work. The work that SONG does is based on history and the value of resiliency. The organization focuses on the South, especially as a place and space for LGBTQ people. Their focus is on a dream of a movement that brings people of different identities, including age, race, gender, ability, and sexuality, together. SONG strives to put LGBTQ people in places of leadership, and they act on this by connecting LGBTQ people with each other. SONG believes in honoring each person and supporting activists to become their best selves.

== History ==
SONG was founded at the National LGBTQ Task Force's 1993 Creating Change conference with the goal of building progressive movements across the American South by six women, including Mandy Carter and Mab Segrest. Southerners on New Ground is an organization that focuses on the liberation of the LQBTQ+ community. SONG was founded in 1993 by three white lesbians and three black lesbians. The foundation is based in the South, primarily in small towns and rural areas, which is relatively new ground for LGBTQ+ organizations. They chose to create this foundation in the South because the history of the South is so deeply connected to white supremacy, poverty, slave labor, homophobia, transphobia, racism, and oppression. They view the history of the South as a place for hope, redemption, and reconciliation in honor of those that came before them. They created this foundation because they have a love for their region, but must fight to stay there because of the growing violence, unemployment, and isolation that they are experiencing in the South.

The organization states that their primary goal is to build and maintain an infrastructure that will combat infrastructure that is built for the oppression of their communities, such as environmental degradation and economic oppression. They also want to amplify intersectionality and unite people for a common good. Other goals are to make people’s whole selves visible by organizing across all margins of race, class, culture, gender, and sexuality, and the development of relationships between people who could and should be allies but may not have the awareness to create an allyship.

In 2010, Cara Page, a leading healing justice voice, participated in an intergenerational dialogue reflecting on SONG’s legacy and transformation, emphasizing its role in Southern movement-building through a queer and trans lens.

The organization was asked by the 40th Anniversary Steering Committee for the 1963 March on Washington for Jobs and Freedom to mobilize LGBT participation at the rally. They have also accomplished creating the first LGBTQ+ led organizing school across the South, and training racial and economic justice organizations to include homophobia and transphobia in their work. They have made such leeway in their original goals that they have now expanded to aid many different programs and contributed to different organizations since their founding 29 years ago.

== Programs ==
Southerners on New Ground's programs include community trainings and policy advocacy at the intersection of race, class, culture, gender and sexual identity across the south. According to SONG's 2019 End of Year Report, SONG had 429 members and chapters in Richmond, VA, Floyd, VA, Nashville, TN, Greensboro, NC, Durham, NC, Birmingham, AL, and Atlanta, GA. Across these chapters, SONG offers many training and leadership development programs for their members and community. SONG focuses on social justice work and advocacy in their programs. SONG partners and supports many other organizations through their Kindred Spirit Organizations and Coalitions.

=== Training & Leadership Development Programs ===
Southerners on New Ground has many programs that build the leadership of their members and share information on social justice. One program Lorde’s Werq is a regional cohort composed of Black, queer, trans, and gender non-conforming leaders. The purpose of Lorde’s Werq is to train leaders and participate in volunteer and advocacy work. Another program offered by SONG is Murph’s Kindred Fellowship Program. This program is a year-long program in which fellows learn more about SONG, the mission, and leadership training while participating in social justice work. Throughout 2022, SONG has offered monthly virtual programs to learn more about and discuss topics ranging from the prison industrial complex to SONG’s history.

=== Black Mama’s Bail Out Action ===
One particular social campaign that SONG has become very involved in is the National Bail Out. National Bail Out works to protect families, break down barriers, and take action on the bail system that keeps many community members locked up. SONG has worked to bail out many African American mothers and other community members. SONG believes that the money bail system has many negative effects on families and communities. Additionally, SONG particularly focuses on bailing out mothers because they believe the community suffers because of it. In 2019, SONG bailed out 61 mothers and caregivers.

==== Immigration ====
In July 2014, Southerners on New Ground partnered with Familia: Trans Queer Liberation Movement to conduct a sit-in by LGBT and immigration activists at the office of Congressman Mark Takano, prompting the Congressional LGBT Equality Caucus to draft a statement to President Barack Obama on the needs of undocumented LGBT people.

=== Coalitions & Alliances ===
Southerners on New Ground has partnered with organizations at the intersection of racial and economic justice. SONG allies with social justice organizations that share similar ideals. SONG completes and supports different projects and programs with these organizations. SONG’s coalitions and alliances include AgitArte, Center for Resilient, Individuals, Families, and Communities (CRIFC), Movement for Black Lives, National Bail Out, Mijente, and Transgender Law Center.

=== Kindred Spirit Organizations ===
"Igniting the Kindred," SONG's project and motto, refers to gathering people who have similar experiences in the context of racism, transphobia, homophobia, ableism, sexism, nationalism, and exploitation in the American South. Kindred Spirit Organizations are other social advocacy organizations that share very similar values and political ideologies. SONG states that they help, support, and keep in contact with their Kindred Spirit Organizations. SONG includes these organizations as their Kindred Spirit Organizations: All of Us or None, BYP100, Compañeros Inmigrantes De Las Montañas En Acción (CIMA), Esperanza Peace & Justice Center, Familia Trans Queer Liberation Movement, Free Hearts, Georgia Latino Alliance For Human Rights, Highlander Researcher and Education Center, House of GG, Ice Out of RVA, Jacksonville Area Sexual Minority Youth Network (JASMYN), Kindred Southern Healing Justice Collective, Law For Black Lives, Media Justice, National Network Immigrant & Refugee Rights (NNIRR), National Queer Asian Pacific Islander Alliance (NQAPIA), Project South, Queer Women of Color Media Arts Project (QWOCMAP), Reframe Mentorship, Resource Generation, Sanctuary Collective, Silicon Valley De-Bug, Sister Song, Southern Movement Alliance, Southwest Workers Union, Spark, Student Action with Farmworkers, The Audre Lorde Project, The Ordinary People’s Society (TOPS), The Southern Center for Human Rights, The Sylvia Rivera Law Project, Transgender, Gender Variant and Intersex (TGI) Justice Project, and Virginia Anti-Violence Project.
