= S. M. Rodriguez =

Abolitionist scholar, author, and queer activist

S.M. Rodriguez
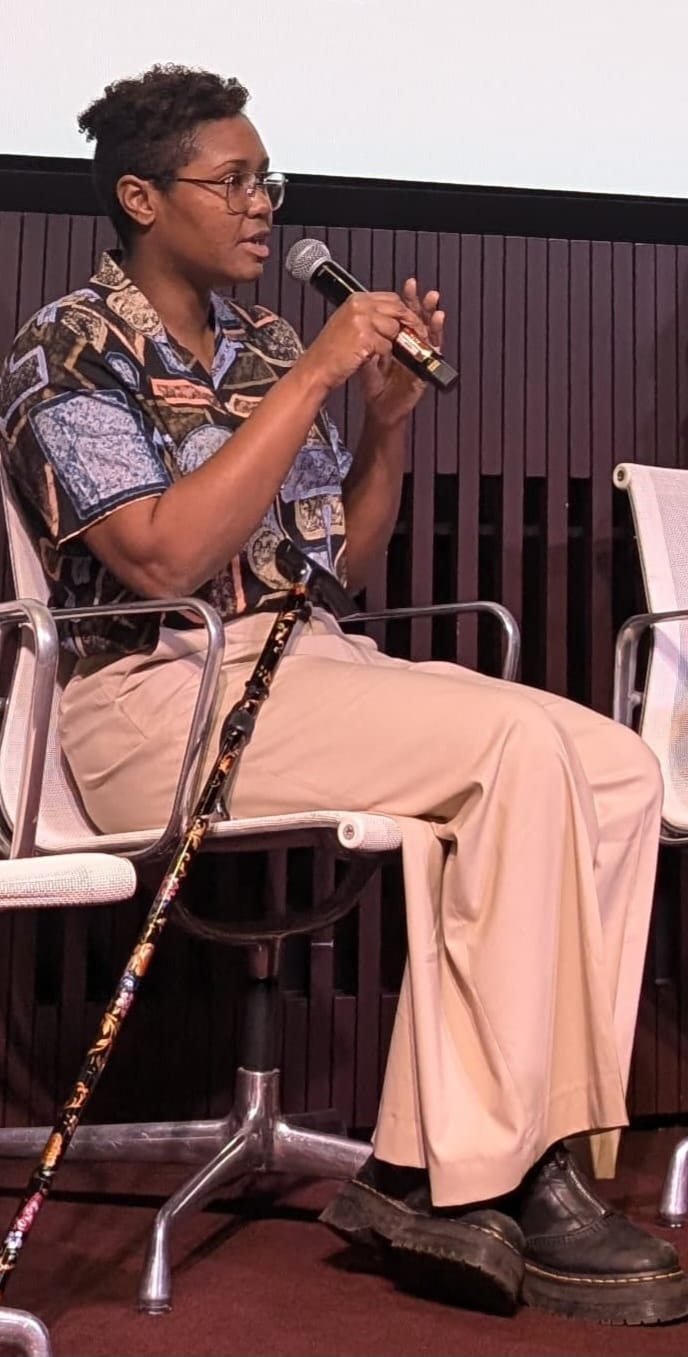
- S.M. Rodriguez at Tate Modern, London, 2025
- Education: University of Florida (BA); Stony Brook University (MA, PhD)
- Occupations: Scholar, author, anti-violence community organiser
- Employer: London School of Economics and Political Science
- Known for: Research on LGBTQ+ movements, penal abolitionism, healing justice, and transnational advocacy
- Notable work: The Economies of Queer Inclusion: Transnational Organizing for LGBTI Rights in Uganda
- Title: Associate Professor
- Website: www.smrodriguez.com

S.M. Rodriguez is a scholar-activist and author whose work focuses on feminist, queer, and critical race studies, with research on carceral systems, anti-violence organizing, and global human rights. They are Associate Professor of Gender, Rights and Human rights in the Department of Gender Studies at the London School of Economics and Political Science (LSE), and the author of The Economies of Queer Inclusion: Transnational Organizing for LGBTI Rights in Uganda (2019).

== Education ==
S.M. Rodriguez earned a Bachelor of Arts degree, magna cum laude, in Sociology from the University of Florida. They earned Master of Arts in Sociology in 2012 from Stony Brook University followed by a PhD in Sociology in 2016.

== Career ==
Rodriguez is currently an Associate professor of Gender, Rights and Human Rights in the Department of Gender studies at the London School of Economics and Political Science (LSE). They served as Assistant Professor of Criminology and Director of LGBTQ+ Studies at Hofstra University prior to joining LSE.

Rodriguez's research focuses on race, gender, sexuality, disability, criminalisation, and state violence. Their scholarship examines queer social movements, abolitionist feminism, healing justice, violence prevention, and transnational LGBTQ+ organising in Africa.

Alongside their academic career, they have worked as a community organiser and advocate, in the United States, participating in anti-violence initiatives and movements seeking alternatives to punitive and carceral approaches to social harm. They served as a core member of the Safe OUTside the System (SOS) Collective and on the Board of directors of the Audre Lorde Project, where Cara Page was Executive director. They are the initiator of Black Queer Movements, a platform for knowledge exchange among activists of African descent working on issues related to gender, sexuality, and social justice, and the Black Professors Pipeline, which supports access, equity, and representation within higher education.

== The Economies of Queer Inclusion ==
In 2019, Rodriguez published The Economies of Queer Inclusion: Transnational Organizing for LGBTI Rights in Uganda with Lexington Books. The book looks at LGBTQ+ organising in Uganda during debates surrounding anti-homosexuality legislation, examining the role of international donors, advocacy organisations, and transnational networks in shaping local movement strategies. According to Bloomsbury publishers, "the research highlights how the introduction of international attention and funding causes organizations to restructure their movement goals and strategies in order to best attract desired partners." The book shows how "funder-funded relationship causes both local discord and transnational divestment from alternative forms of organizing." In a review for Wagadu: A Journal of Transnational Women's and Gender Studies, Katharina Wiedlack commended its use of counter‑storytelling and decolonial analysis to challenge dominant Western narratives about Uganda and LGBTQ+ organising. Despite the work's titular focus on transnational organizing, she noted that the agency and strategies of Ugandan activists themselves were underrepresented. The book earned an Honorable Mention for the American Sociological Association Distinguished Book Award in its Sexualities section.

== Selected publications ==
- Rodriguez, S. M. (2026). "Enforcing the 'Unnatural Offence': Sodomy Legislation and Anti‑Queer Panoptic Policing in Uganda". Feminist Legal Studies. doi:10.1007/s10691-026-09604-8.
- Rodriguez, S. M. (2025). "Reconceptualizing Gender Transitioning: Recognition, Flexibility, and Safety in Nonbinary Identity Journeys." Sociological Inquiry. First published 21 June 2025. doi:10.1111/soin.70018
- Rodriguez, S. M. (2025). "Respatialising the Global Imaginary of Gay Rights: Resisting Africana Epistemicide and Forging Solidaristic Imaginaries". The International Journal of Human Rights. doi:10.1080/13642987.2025.2561667
- Rodriguez, S. M. (2023). "Forging Black Safety in the Carceral Diaspora: Perverse Criminalization, Sexual Corrections, and Connection-Making in a Death World". Social Justice.
- Rodriguez, S. M. (2022). "Queers against Corrective Development: LGBTSTGNC Anti-Violence Organizing in Gentrifying Times". GLQ: A Journal of Lesbian and Gay Studies, 28 (2): 165–184. JSTOR. doi:10.1215/10642684-9608105
- Rodriguez, S. M.; Ben-Moshe, L.; Rakes, H. (2020). "Carceral Protectionism and the Perpetually (In)Vulnerable". Criminology & Criminal Justice 20 (5): 537–550. doi:10.1177/1748895820947450
- Rodriguez, S. M. (2019). The Economies of Queer Inclusion: Transnational Organizing for LGBTI Rights in Uganda. Lanham, Maryland: Lexington Books. ISBN 9781498581738.
