= Sissy: A Coming-of-Gender Story =

2019 memoir by Jacob Tobia

- Author: Jacob Tobia
- Language: English
- Genre: Memoir
- Published: 2019
- Publisher: G.P. Putnam's Sons
- Publication place: United States
- ISBN: 978-0-7352-1882-6

Sissy: A Coming-of-Gender Story is a 2019 memoir written by Jacob Tobia, and published by Putnam, an imprint of Penguin Group.

== Critical reception ==
The New York Times wrote "Tobia makes clear early on that this book will not be your traditional 'Transgender 101'. Even so, through evocative rhetoric, the memoir subtly educates even the most uninformed reader about the spectrum of nonbinary identities by recounting Tobia’s various coming-out experiences, their initial refuge in their Methodist faith and their gradual self-discovery and advocacy as a visible student at a Southern university."

Kirkus Reviews writes "Though the author sometimes overdoes the self-congratulation and snarkiness, these flaws are more than overcome by the feisty candor and wit, especially when discussing their relationship with their parents and the church that at first rejected but then finally accepted Tobia’s sparkling 'queer spirit.' A funny, sharply observed, and intelligent journey into self-identity."

== Adaptation ==
In 2019, Showtime announced it would develop a half-hour show based on the memoir.
