= Erica Woodland =

Trans American Social Worker

- Citizenship: American
- Education: Brown University, University of Maryland
- Occupations: Social worker, Psychotherapist, healing justice practitioner
- Organisation(s): National Queer and Trans Therapists of Color Network
- Website: www.ericawoodland.com

Erica Woodland is an American licensed clinical social worker, psychotherapist and healing justice practitioner. He is the founder and executive director of the National Queer and Trans Therapists of Color Network (NQTTCN). He is a co-editor of Healing Justice Lineages: Dreaming at the Crossroads of Liberation, Collective Care, and Safety, published with Cara Page in 2023.

== Education ==
Woodland earned a bachelor's degree in Human Biology and Psychology from Brown University and Master of Social Work from the University of Maryland, Baltimore.

== Career ==
Woodland founded the NQTTCN in 2016 and serves as the executive director to address systemic barriers to mental health resources for queer and trans Black, Indigenous and People of Color. NQTTCN has trained and mobilised hundreds of mental health practitioners committed to intervening on the legacy of harm and violence of the medical industrial complex while building liberatory models of care rooted in abolition through Woodland leadership.

In 2023, Woodland co-edited Healing Justice Lineages: Dreaming at the Crossroads of Liberation, Collective Care, and Safety with Cara Page. Kimberly Williams Brown highlighted in Women's Studies Quarterly review that the book connected healing justice to collective care, liberation, and responses to intergenerational and structural trauma, while noting its limited transnational perspective.

== Bibliography ==
- Healing Justice Lineages: Dreaming at the Crossroads of Liberation, Collective Care, and Safety (2023), co-edited with Cara Page. Published by North Atlantic Books. ISBN 978-1-62317-714-0

== See also ==
- Prentis Hemphill
- Adaku Utah
- Cara Page
