= Prentis Hemphill =

American writer, therapist, and somatics facilitator

- Citizenship: American
- Education: Master of Arts in Clinical psychology
- Occupations: Writer; therapist; somatic facilitator
- Notable work: What It Takes to Heal
- Website: prentishemphill.com

Prentis Hemphill is an American writer, therapist, and somatic facilitator. They are the founder of The Embodiment Institute and the author of What It Takes To Heal: How Transforming Ourselves Can Change the World (2024).

== Background ==
Hemphill is a longtime community organizer involved in healing justice and somatic practice. They spent 10 years doing healing work around their relationship with their father while extending their embodied healing practice through work with Black movements and marginalized communities. They hold an M.A in Clinical psychology.

== Career ==
Hemphill's work focuses on somatic and embodiment-based approaches within social justice, feminist and LGBTQIA community organising. They have worked with Black Organizing for Leadership and Dignity (BOLD) as a somatic practitioner. They served as Healing Justice Director at the Black Lives Matter Global Network before founding The Embodiment Institute (TEI).

Hemphill founded The Embodiment Institute to provide training and public education in embodiment and healing justice. They host the podcast Finding Our Way, which explores embodiment, relational practice, and healing justice through interviews and guided reflections. In 2021, they contributed a chapter titled The Wisdom of Process in You Are Your Best Thing: Vulnerability, Shame Resilience, and the Black Experience anthology edited by Tarana Burke and Brené Brown. In 2024, they published What It Takes To Heal: How Transforming Ourselves Can Change The World.

== Book Reception ==
Hemphill's What It Takes to Heal: How Transforming Ourselves Can Change the World was published by Random House in 2024. Lakiba Pittman's review of the book in Journal of Black Psychology highlighted its accessibility and integration of personal narrative, somatic therapy, and cultural analysis, while noting that readers seeking evidence-based research or comparative frameworks might desire greater engagement with non-Western traditions and empirical studies. Lauren Brownlee in Friends Journal discussed What It Takes to Heal alongside Loving Corrections by adrienne maree brown, through the lens of its personal transformation and social change connection.

== Bibliography ==
- What It Takes to Heal: How Transforming Ourselves Can Change the World (Random House, 2024; paperback edition 2025).ISBN 9780593946725
- “The Wisdom of Process,” in You Are Your Best Thing: Vulnerability, Shame Resilience, and the Black Experience, edited by Tarana Burke and Brené Brown (Random House, 2021).ISBN 9780593243633

== See also ==
- Erica Woodland
- Adaku Utah
- Cara Page
