= Indianarae Siqueira =

Brazilian activist (born 1971)

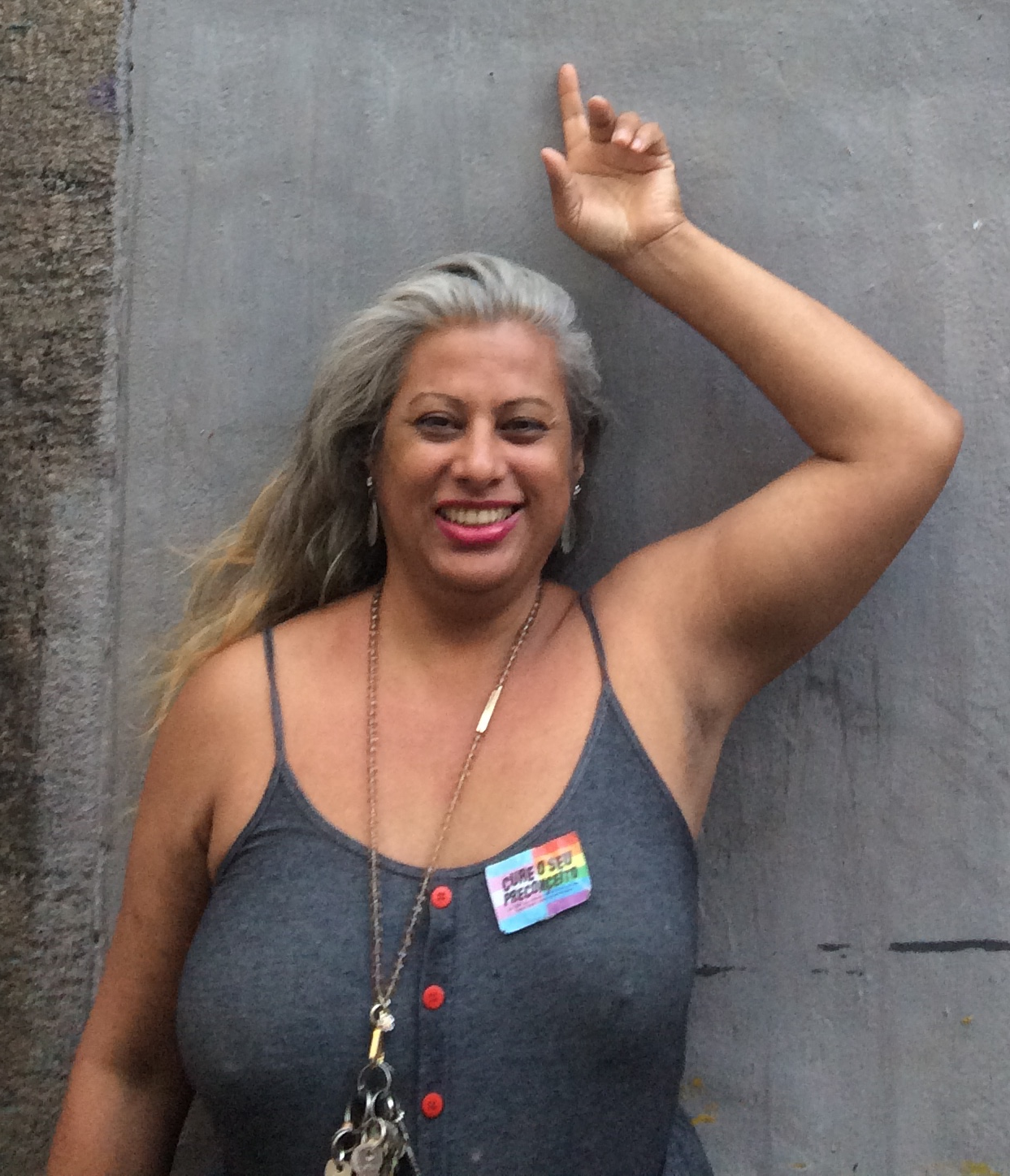
- Born: 18 May 1971 (age 55); Paranaguá, Paraná, Brazil
- Occupation: Activist

Indianarae Alves Siqueira (Paranaguá, 18 May 1971) is a Brazilian activist, president of the Transrevolução group, founder and coordinator of CasaNem — a shelter for LGBTQ people in situations of social vulnerability, and PreparaNem, a community-based preparatory course for the ENEM exam for transgender people. They (Note: Despite being referred to using feminine pronouns by most sources, Indianarae uses the Portuguese neuter pronouns "elu/delu", equivalent to the English "they/their".) are the creator of the term "transvestigênere" (lit. 'Transvestigender'). Two documentaries were made in their honor: Indianara, by Aude Chevalier-Beaumel and Marcelo Barbosa, and Your Mother's Comfort, by Adam Golub.

== Biography ==
An Indigenous person of Mbyá Guaraní ancestry, Siqueira began taking hormones at age 12. At 18, they left home and began wearing women's clothing, lived on the streets of São Paulo, and started prostituting themselves in Santos. With the arrival of the AIDS epidemic, they became an activist after seeing many of their companions die. As a consequence, they founded the travesti group Filadélfia in Santos – the group was the first in Brazil to demand that the social name be mandatory in the medical records of travesti and transsexual people. Indianarae was sold into prostitution by an international trafficking network, from which they managed to escape by paying the price they were sold for. They lived in Switzerland, where they rented apartments so that prostitutes could become independent, with the aim of dismantling pimping networks. In France, they denounced prostitution trafficking networks and were imprisoned for two and a half years. While in prison, they campaigned for travesti people to be referred to using female pronouns and for women's clothing to be provided. Since 2009, Siqueira has lived in Rio de Janeiro and continue their political activism in defense of sex workers and LGBTQ+ people.

In 2022, Siqueira managed to amend their documents to include non-binary gender, becoming one of the first people to achieve this in Paraná, their home state.

== Activism and political life ==
Indianarae Siqueira started CasaNem in Rio de Janeiro in 2015, in the Lapa neighborhood. Since September 2020, the shelter for LGBTQ people in situations of social vulnerability has been located in a property provided by the Rio de Janeiro state government in the Flamengo neighborhood, in the southern part of the city. Since November 2020, there has also been a CasaNem in Nova Iguaçu, in the Baixada Fluminense region. In total, the two houses together shelter approximately 50 people.

Siqueira ran for city councilor in the Rio de Janeiro Municipal Elections for the Socialism and Liberty Party in 2016 and for the Workers' Party in 2020 and 2024, being elected as an alternate councilor in the first two candidacies.

In 2019, the National Executive of the Socialism and Liberty Party expelled Indianarae Siqueira from the party. The measure was approved by the PSOL National Directorate based on an opinion from the party's National Ethics Committee, which considered that the consolidation of CasaNem took place in the space where Casa Nuvem, a space for art and social activism, existed, and that it occurred through the violent expulsion of the founders from the site and threats against them, using methods contrary to the ethical principles defended by PSOL. The expulsion caused an uproar from the Associação Nacional de Travestis e Transexuais and motivated Duda Salabert's disaffiliation from the party.

Indianarae is vegan and anti-capitalist.
