= Qween Amor =

Performance Artist

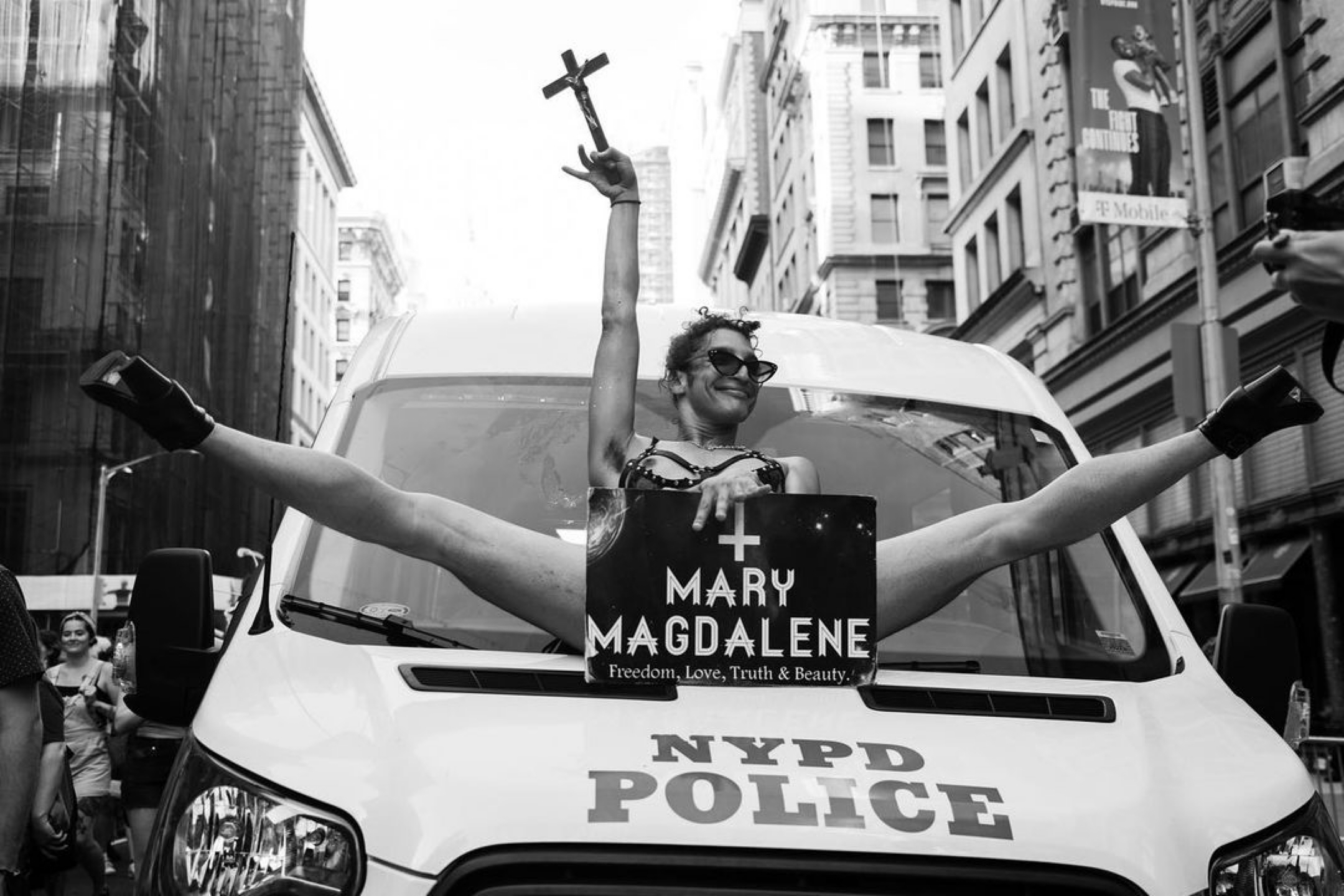
Qween Amor

Qween Amor is an American performance artist who predominantly utilizes public space for her performances. Amor seeks to "inspire more artists to go out and display their art in protest; it's a liberation movement to embrace one's own freedom". Since 2013, Qween Amor has been performing in New York City.

Qween Amor reports going to court five times yearly to face charges for playing music too loud in the streets. Amor refuses to pay fines and always persuades the judge to dismiss charges. Amor has never been charged with indecent exposure. In December 2012, Amor was arrested while performing for a group of Black Hebrew Israelites in Washington DC. Amor frequently performs in a G-string, tutu, and Stiletto heel shoes. Amor uses she/her as pronouns. In May 2013, Qween Amor was assaulted and robbed during a performance.

== Radical performance as activism ==
Qween Amor, a trans woman of color and performance artist, has spent over a decade transforming public spaces into venues of resistance and liberation. She uses her body as both a canvas and weapon, confronting entrenched systemic injustices including colonialism, transphobia, and state violence. Her activism often involves nearly naked twerking protests, symbolic gestures like carrying a large crucifix to challenge religious justifications for violence, and dramatic public acts — such as dancing defiantly in front of hate groups or police vehicles — that capture attention and spark conversation. Through these bold performances, she reclaims public space for marginalized voices and creates immediate moments of collective unity and healing across diverse audiences (including allies and strangers alike).

== Intersectional and inclusive approach ==
Amor’s activism is deeply intersectional. She highlights how oppression against the LGBTQ+ community, especially trans people of color, is interwoven with religious intolerance, racism, and systemic violence. She refuses to isolate one issue from another, insisting that to fight for trans rights is to confront all sources of systemic oppression. This broad lens helps raise awareness about the disproportionate impact of violence and discrimination on trans and queer people of color, who face marginalization even within the broader LGBTQ+ community. She also stresses the importance of community solidarity, believing that true liberation cannot happen unless all oppressed groups are united.

== Raising trans visibility and awareness ==
Amor is vocal about the daily realities and dangers facing trans individuals, including the high rates of fatal violence on trans and nonbinary people. Through her social media platforms and in-person demonstrations, she continuously promotes trans awareness and education, encouraging conversations that foster acceptance and safety. Her activism pushes others to recognize the lived experiences and humanity of trans people beyond stereotypes, advocating for safe spaces and police reform to address systemic brutality. Her work amplifies the voices of trans women of color who have historically been sidelined within both wider society and LGBTQ+ movements.
