= Matheusa Passareli =

Brazilian non-binary artist and LGBTQ activist (1997–2018)

- Born: January 1997; Rio Bonito, Rio de Janeiro, Brazil
- Died: April 29, 2018 (aged 21); Rio de Janeiro, Brazil
- Education: State University of Rio de Janeiro
- Occupations: Artist and activist

Matheusa Passareli Simões Vieira (January 1997 – April 29, 2018) was a Brazilian visual artist and LGBTQ activist. They identified as non-binary and were murdered at the age of 21.

== Biography ==
Matheusa was born in Rio Bonito, in the interior of the state of Rio de Janeiro. They were the first person in their family to attend college, studying visual arts at the State University of Rio de Janeiro (UERJ). They also attended School of Visual Arts at the Parque Lage, starting research on queer language and performance.

=== Activism and art ===
As a LGBTQ activist, Matheusa defied gender norms and fought against prejudice. They were an active member of two art collectives, "Seus putos" and "Xica Manicongo", where they created art and engaged in LGBTQ+ activism. They used their art to challenge gender and racial norms, making racial activism their primary cause.

== Death and investigations ==
On April 29, 2018, Matheusa disappeared after leaving a party in the Encantado neighborhood, in the northern part of Rio de Janeiro. They were murdered by drug dealers in Morro do 18, in Quintino. In July 2024, the principal defendant for the murder, Manuel Avelino de Sousa Junior, was sentenced to 18 years and four months of prison for the crimes of murder with a base motive and concealment of a corpse.

== Legacy and tributes ==
Matheusa was portrayed in the documentary "Sempre Verei Cores no seu Cinza", directed by filmmaker Anabela Roque. The film addresses the crisis at UERJ and shows the performance of students against the abandonment of the university.

The academic center of the Institute of Arts of UERJ was renamed as Matheusa Passareli Academic Center, in 2018.
