= Illinois Caucus for Adolescent Health =

The Illinois Caucus for Adolescent Health (ICAH) is an adolescent sexual health advocacy organization located in Chicago, Illinois. Founded in 1977 as the Illinois Caucus on Teenage Pregnancy, the organization works in the fields of adolescent welfare, workforce development, health, and parenting.

== Priorities and Strategies ==
ICAH works to increase access to and equity of adolescent sexual health care, increase access to and equity of responsible sexuality education in schools and communities, and ensure support for pregnant and parenting youth to complete their educational goals. Their strategies include youth leadership development, grassroots organizing, youth and adult training, policy analysis and development, and legislative advocacy.

== History ==
Founded in 1977 as the Illinois Caucus on Teenage Pregnancy, the organization has accomplished much in the fields of adolescent welfare, workforce development, health, and parenting.

The 1960s introduced the birth control pill—and the potential for women to gain greater control over their reproductive lives. In 1967, Cook County Hospital began dispensing birth control, and within 10 years the hospital's birth rate dropped by a third. In 1969, a new state law legalizing family planning services for unmarried adolescents of any age was passed after an 11-year-old gave birth to twins.

In the 1970s, the Chicago Women's Liberation Union worked tirelessly to set up grassroots health programs for women. When CWLU demobilized, activist Jenny Knauss continued organizing around health care system reform on behalf of Illinois young people, and in 1983 she became the first executive director of the Caucus. In 1991, the organization changed its name to the Illinois Caucus for Adolescent Health to reflect their broadening agenda.

For more than three decades, ICAH has organized and trained young people to advocate for issues that directly affect their lives and communities. ICAH has conducted statewide research, developed resources, changed public policy, and hosted frequent events and training sessions for youth and service providers, always with an emphasis on building youth leadership skills and serving marginalized populations, including low-income, immigrant, homeless, LGBTQ, and pregnant and parenting adolescents.
