= CasaNem =

Brazilian LGBTQ shelter

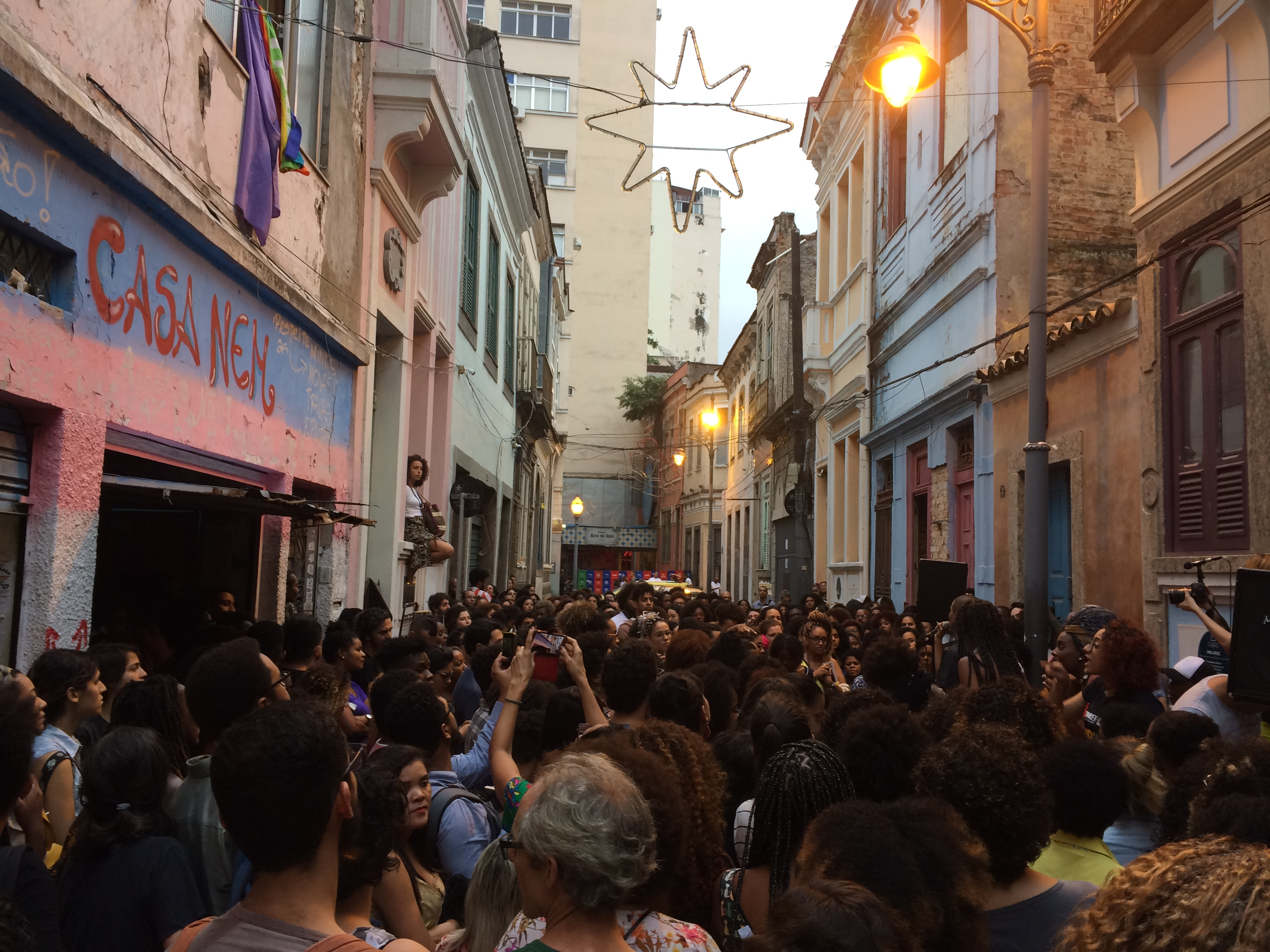
- Headquarters of Casa Nem on Rua Moraes e Vale in Lapa, Rio de Janeiro, during an event in 2017.
- Formation: February 2016; 10 years ago
- Founder: Indianarae Siqueira
- Founded at: Lapa, Rio de Janeiro
- Headquarters: Rio de Janeiro, Brazil
- Website: https://www.instagram.com/casanem_?igsi=bzViYWJjb3pld21u

CasaNem is a shelter in Rio de Janeiro, Brazil, that houses LGBTQ people in situations of social vulnerability, mostly transgender and travesti individuals. It develops programs and activities in various areas, focusing on the autonomy and culture of its residents, in addition to providing services and offering workshops and courses.

== History ==
CasaNem was founded by transfeminist activists, including Indianarae Siqueira. In February 2016, it began as an occupation of the property formerly belonging to the Casa Nuvem artistic collective, in the Lapa neighborhood.

In 2018, following the eviction from the property, the CasaNem Stonewall Inn occupation was founded in the Copacabana neighborhood of Rio de Janeiro. Since then, CasaNem has occupied properties in the Lapa, Bonsucesso, and Vila Isabel neighborhoods. Currently, the occupation has the support of a network of volunteer collaborators such as psychologists, lawyers, teachers, and doctors. Furthermore, it is part of the Internationalist Homeless Front (FIST), which provides legal assistance in the process of reclaiming possession of the property.

Over the years, CasaNem has faced evictions through repossession orders, some with reports of police brutality, until they reached an agreement with the state government to obtain permanent housing. During their time in Copacabana in 2019, the presence of the shelter in the neighborhood and neighbors sometimes led them to call the police to try to remove the residents from the occupation, including on Christmas Eve when police went to the building several times during the early morning hours in response to complaints. During this period, CasaNem organized a four-day celebration called Desnatal (lit. 'Unchristmas'), aimed at welcoming LGBTQ people excluded from Christmas festivities, and hosted approximately 150 people, in addition to the building's residents.

=== Occupation of the Almeida Rego building ===
Abandoned for over 18 years in 2019, the Almeida Rego building, occupied by CasaNem on Rua Dias da Rocha in Copacabana, housed a collection of artworks. The other members of the occupation discovered the pieces while cleaning the property and called the Federal Police and the National Museum, handing over all the works to the National Institute of Historic and Artistic Heritage (Iphan) and the museum. According to Indianarae Siqueira:

The place was completely abandoned, with several dead animals, pigeons, rats, stagnant water; it was a breeding ground for disease for the local population. And a lot of dirt; we removed eight dumpsters of garbage from this building, gave it a basic renovation to make it habitable, as there were windows that fell on pedestrians.

The action of the authorities and the presence of the press in front of the old building drew the attention of neighbors, and some residents said that the owner of the property is a woman who inherited it from her mother, who had been employed for years by the building's owner, both of whom are now deceased. After that, the administrator of the heir's estate went to court to reclaim the building.

Among the artifacts found were busts, including one of Alberto Santos-Dumont, paintings, vases, stuffed animals, and animal and human remains. The director of the National Museum visited the site and said that some pieces could be part of future exhibitions. The remains, however, were investigated by the police. At the time, approximately 50 people were occupying CasaNem, including several families. Besides contacting the authorities, the occupants also attempted to legalize their electricity supply and contacted engineers and architects to assess the building's condition. However, the Civil Court of Rio authorized the repossession of the property, evicting the occupants.

=== Housing assignment ===
In 2020, residents managed to negotiate a temporary location while awaiting the transfer of a building from the Municipal Secretariat of Urbanism (SMU). At the time, the house occupied an abandoned building in Copacabana, but the property owners obtained a court order for repossession, which was enforced with the presence of the Military Police of the State of Rio de Janeiro. CasaNem was temporarily housed in a state school in the Copacabana neighborhood, which was possible thanks to the demands of the house's residents, who sought a peaceful relocation to another address. The permanent space ceded by the State government is located in Flamengo, in the South Zone of the city, and has a five-year lease, which can be extended for another five years.

On 15 March 2021, CasaNem was invaded, and the invaders were identified as family members of one of the residents. They made death threats against the residents during the incident.

== Projects ==
- PreparaNem: This was the organization's first project and started as a preparatory course for university entrance exams aimed at transgender people. It began in downtown Rio de Janeiro and expanded to include classes in Maré and Niterói. It has dozens of volunteer teachers and supporters.
- Workshops in sewing and tailoring, Brazilian Sign Language classes, capoeira, photography, and art history.
