= Lann Hornscheidt =

German academic

- Hornscheidt in 2015
- Born: 1965 (age 60–61); Velbert, West Germany

Academic background
- Education: University of Kiel (PhD); Humboldt University of Berlin (Habilitation)

Academic work
- Discipline: Gender theorist
- Institutions: Humboldt University of Berlin

Lann Hornscheidt (born Antje Hornscheidt, 1965) is a German academic active in the fields of gender studies and linguistics. Hornscheidt is non-binary.

== Academic career ==
Lann Hornscheidt obtained a PhD degree at the University of Kiel. From 2007 to 2016, Hornscheidt was professor for Gender Studies and Language Analysis at the Centre for Transdisciplinary Gender Studies at the Humboldt University of Berlin. Hornscheidt has had visiting professorships and periods of research at the universities of Örebro, Lund, Turku, Uppsala, Graz, Innsbruck and Södertörn (Stockholm). Hornscheidt received the habilitation in Scandinavian Linguistics at the Humboldt University of Berlin in 2004 with a habilitation thesis on linguistic designation of persons from a constructivist point of view in modern Swedish.

== Controversy ==
Hornscheidt has created controversy and prompted hateful comments on social media by asking to be addressed in a gender-neutral way, e.g. with the title "Professx" (instead of "Professor", which is male, or "Professorin", which is female). In 2020, Hornscheidt lodged an appeal to the German Federal Constitutional Court after having been told by the Federal Court of Justice that it was not possible to remove the gender marker from Hornscheidt's birth registration entry without a process under a law called Transsexuellengesetz requiring two psychological expert opinions.

== Select bibliography ==
- Die sprachliche Benennung von Personen aus konstruktivistischer Sicht. Genderspezifizierung und ihre diskursive Verhandlung im heutigen Schwedisch. de Gruyter, Berlin and New York 2006, ISBN 978-3-11-018526-3 (This is the habilitation thesis presented at the Humboldt University of Berlin in 2004 under the title: Personale Appellation aus konstruktivistischer Sicht am Beispiel von Genderspezifizierung und ihrer diskursiven Verhandlung im heutigen Schwedisch)
- with Katharina Walgenbach, Gabriele Dietze and Kerstin Palm: Gender als interdependente Kategorie. Neue Perspektiven auf Intersektionalität, Diversität und Heterogenität. Barbara Budrich, Leverkusen 2007, ISBN 978-3-86649-871-6, 2nd edition, 2012, ISBN 978-3-86649-496-1
- Sweden - the world's most feminist society: An analysis of current Swedish media debates and person appellation forms as a tool within CDA, Journal of Language and Politics, 2008, ISSN 1569-2159
- Gender resignifiziert. Schwedische (Aus)Handlungen in und um Sprache. Humboldt University of Berlin, 2008, ISBN 978-3-932406-29-4
- with Adibeli Nduka-Agwu (editor): Rassismus auf gut Deutsch. Ein kritisches Nachschlagewerk zu rassistischen Sprachhandlungen. Brandes & Apsel, Frankfurt am Main 2010, ISBN 978-3-86099-643-0
- with Hanna Acke, Gisa Marehn, Ines Jana (editors): Schimpfwörter – Beschimpfungen – Pejorisierungen. Wie in Sprache Macht und Identitäten verhandelt werden. Brandes & Apsel, Frankfurt am Main 2011, ISBN 978-3-86099-684-3
- feministische w_orte. ein lern-, denk- und handlungsbuch zu sprache und diskriminierung, gender studies und feministischer linguistik. Brandes & Apsel, Frankfurt am Main 2012, ISBN 978-3-86099-948-6
- Zu Lieben. Lieben als politisches Handeln. w_orten & meer, Berlin 2018, ISBN 978-3-945644-14-0
- with Lio Oppenländer: Exit gender. Gender loslassen und strukturelle Gewalt benennen: eigene Wahrnehmung und soziale Realität verändern. w_orten & meer, Berlin 2019, ISBN 978-3-945644-17-1
