= Jeffrey Marsh =

American social media personality

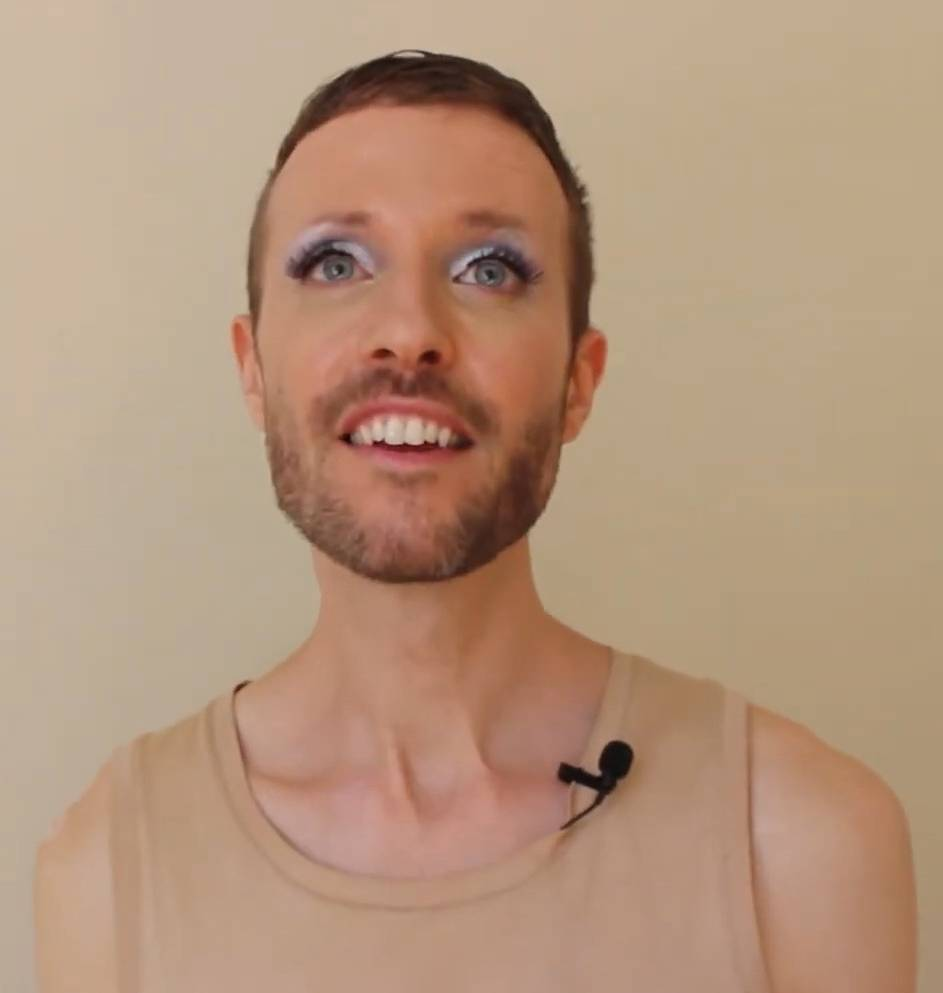
- Marsh in 2015
- Born: Jeffrey Earl Marsh; July 7, 1977 (age 49); York, Pennsylvania, U.S.
- Education: University of the Arts (BFA)
- Occupations: Author, internet personality
- Years active: 2005–present
- Known for: Inspirational posts, podcasts, videos, talks on LGBTQ2+ topics
- Website: jeffreymarsh.com

Jeffrey Earl Marsh (born July 7, 1977) is an American social media personality and author, best known for making viral videos on Vine, Instagram, and TikTok. In 2016, they gave an interview to Newsmax and became the first openly non-binary person to speak on national television. Marsh is the author of How To Be You and Take Your Own Advice. Marsh addresses a variety of topics through social media, including LGBTQ issues, mental health and personal development.

== Early life and education ==
Marsh was born in York, Pennsylvania, to Steven and Stacy Marsh, and grew up on a farm nearby. Stacy was a Lutheran pastor. Marsh has spoken about having felt misunderstood during a self-identified rough childhood, though they felt supported by their parents, describing their parents as their biggest fans.

They attended Spring Grove Area High School in Spring Grove, Pennsylvania, and the William Penn Performing Arts Institute at William Penn Senior High School in York. Marsh graduated from Spring Grove Area High School in 1995.

They later attended college at the University of the Arts in Philadelphia and earned a Bachelor of Fine Arts in Theater Arts in 1999, later moving to New York City to pursue a career in cabaret performance before becoming an internet celebrity and youth advocate in the LGBTQ community.

== Career ==
=== Live performance and cabaret ===
In Philadelphia after college, Marsh was a cabaret performance artist. Marsh's show, An Evening with Jeffrey Marsh, was one of the founding performances of the Philadelphia Gay & Lesbian Theater Festival.

After moving to New York City in 2005, Marsh began performing as part of the downtown cabaret scene. Marsh appeared at popular venues including Joe's Pub and Don't Tell Mama. At Dixon Place, they starred in "Julian", a 2010 musical based on the life of vaudeville performer Julian Eltinge. In 2012, Marsh was commissioned to create a performance art piece honoring Richard Simmons at the Museum of Art and Design.

=== Social media ===
Marsh's Vines usually feature an affirming or empowering statement delivered directly to the camera, or a song, joke, or dance. Their most popular Vine to date, with over 26 million loops, shows Marsh saying, "I can predict the future, and you're going to be ok." It is the Vine that Bustle claims "broke Tumblr with its greatness."

Mashable was the first mainstream media outlet to label Marsh the Internet's "anti-bully". The Huffington Post has said of Marsh: "In the technological age, the face of activism has evolved along with the way in which we communicate. Marsh is part of a generation of LGBTQ activists who, through social media, are changing minds and perceptions in parts of the world where people may not encounter a queer person in their day to day lives." Digg described Marsh's overall message as, "Be yourself. Be happy with yourself. Be more comfortable with your differences — and embrace and enjoy them."

Marsh is the official social media ambassador and red carpet correspondent for the Gay, Lesbian & Straight Education Network (GLSEN). Marsh interviewed several celebrities, including Zachary Quinto and J.J. Abrams, on the red carpet at the 2015 GLSEN Respect Awards.

Marsh created a vine for GLAAD's #LoveWins campaign (celebrating marriage equality) and helped create the #GotYourBack campaign with the media awareness group's staff. Marsh has also worked with The Trevor Project to prevent teen suicide, through their #HeartYourself hashtag campaign.

Marsh also created the #NoTimeToHate myself and #DontSayThatsSoGay campaigns on Vine to combat homophobia and bring awareness to the gay identity.

About Vine, Marsh told Digg, "I make Vines as a time machine, I'm making them for my 10-year-old self back in Pennsylvania on the farm. Which, as I've come to find out, there are a lot of 10-year-old 'me's' around. [My Vines] are a way to bring healing to everybody, including me." One of Marsh's Vines was chosen #5 in BuzzFeed's list of the top Vines of 2014. It depicts Marsh saying, "Don't forget: you have as much of a right to be here as anyone else." Because of their viral popularity, they were awarded the title "Vine's Gay Superheroine" by Digg.

In 2016, CBS described Marsh as "the internet's most beloved anti-bully."

Marsh also has a large following on Instagram and TikTok. Marsh appeared on both LeAnn Rimes’ and Alyssa Milano’s podcasts.

=== Print and other media ===
Marsh has been a contributor to CBS, RTL-TV, CNBC, the BBC, and Rolling Stone, where they have also been interviewed.

In August 2016, Marsh released their first book, How to Be You, via Penguin Random House. The book is Marsh's own story of "growing up fabulous in a small farming town," and also serves as a workbook, inviting readers to participate in activities and answer questions about how they do the things they do. NBC News describes the book as "part memoir, part self-help, but also a workbook," and "'a love letter' to Marsh's 11-year-old self." Marsh said in an interview with Digital Journal that the book is influenced by their practice of Buddhism.

In conjunction with the release of the book How to Be You, they also became a regular contributing writer for Time magazine and Oprah.com.

After The New York Times tweeted a cartoon portraying presidents Donald Trump and Vladimir Putin as a gay lovers, Marsh said: "There seems to be no greater insult than comparing someone to a queer. For an LGBTQ youth, it's not background noise. When it comes up on their feed it feels like a direct personal attack, and to have a group that's as well-established as the New York Times personally attacking you feels horrendous."

In May 2023, Marsh released their second book, Take Your Own Advice via Penguin Random House. The book details Marsh’s activism and Buddhist practice. In their review, Apple Books said "If you’ve ever found it hard to love yourself, Jeffrey Marsh definitely knows how you feel—and how to build up that self-acceptance you’ve been missing." Rolling Stone said of Take Your Own Advice that "Marsh uses their own story of growth and struggle to encourage readers to give themselves the kindness they usually reserve for others".

== Personal life ==
Marsh identifies as genderqueer and uses they/them pronouns. Marsh has also identified at various times as a gay man, queer, and genderfluid.

Marsh is a Buddhist, and has studied Buddhism since the late 1990s.

== See also ==
- Queery
- Media portrayal of LGBTQ people
- Jacob Tobia
