= Alec Butler =

Canadian filmmaker and playwright

- Born: Audrey Butler; 1959 (age 66–67)
- Occupations: Playwright; filmmaker
- Notable work: Black Friday (play)

Alec Butler (born Audrey Butler; 1959) is a Canadian playwright and filmmaker.

== Life and career ==
Butler was born in 1959, and is non-binary and intersex. Butler uses they/them and he/him pronouns. Assigned female at birth, he initially presented as a butch lesbian before coming out as transgender the late 1990s. Before he came out, his work was published under his birth name.

He was a nominee for the Governor General's Award for English-language drama in 1990 for his play Black Friday. He has also worked on artistic projects with The 519 Church St. Community Centre as their first artist-in-residence. He was named one of Toronto's Vital People by the Toronto Community Foundation in 2006.

He identifies as two-spirit and has Miꞌkmaq heritage.

== Plays ==
- Shakedown
- Cradle Pin
- Radical Perversions: 2 Dyke Plays (1990)
- Black Friday (1990)
- Claposis (1990)
- Hardcore Memories (1993)
- Medusa Rising (1996)
- Trans Cab (2005)

Books:

- Radical Perversions: two Dyke Plays by Audrey Butler published by Women's Press, 1991
- Novella called Rough Paradise published May 31, 2014 by Quattro Books

== Films ==
- Trans Mission: Get Yer Motor Runnin' – One-man show at A-Space, Toronto, 2003.
- Misadventures of PussyBoy: First Love / Sick / First Period – Screened at many queer film and video festivals, First Love won the Charles Street Award for emerging video and film makers in 2002 at the InsideOut Festival.
- Audrey's Beard – Named one of the top ten films about transitioning by Curve magazine.
- 5 Seconds of Fame – Commissioned by Toronto's Pride Committee for Pride Toronto, 2007.
- My Friend, Brindley – Works in progress; experimental doc about human rights activist and painter, Kathleen Brindley.
- Darla's Goodbye – Short film based on a short story of the same name published in Red Light: Superheroes, Saints and Sluts.
- Trans Cabaret: The Video
