= Nevo Zisin =

Australian writer and transgender rights activist

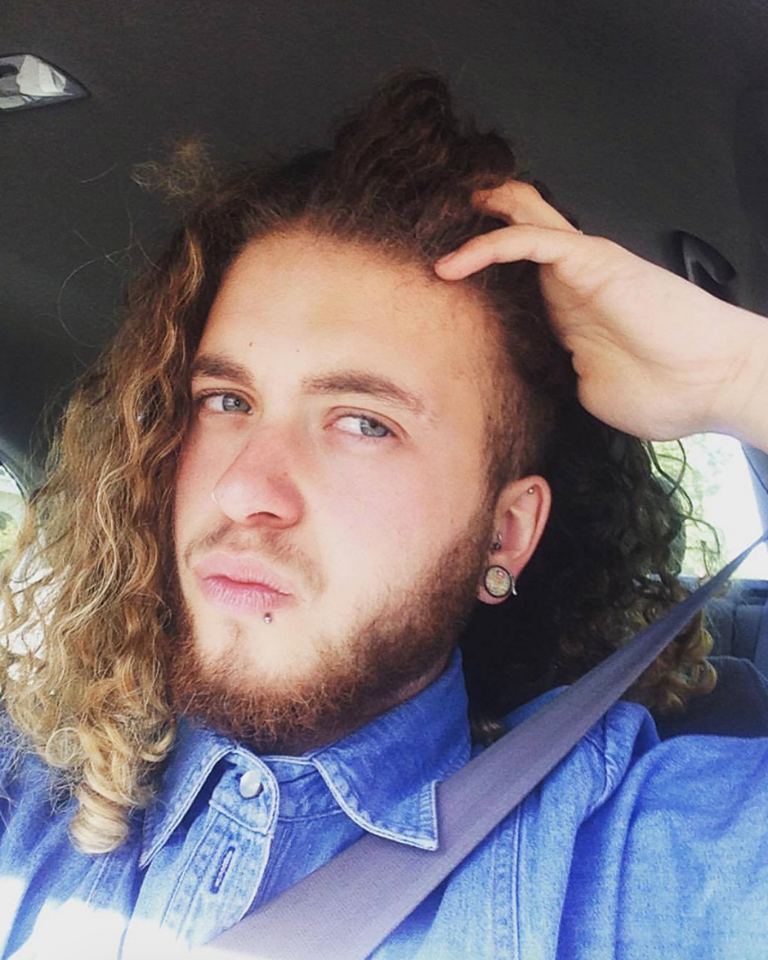
- Born: 1995 or 1996 (age 30–31)
- Citizenship: Australian
- Education: King David School
- Occupation: Writer • activist
- Known for: Transgender advocacy

Nevo Zisin is an Australian writer and transgender rights activist.

== Life and career ==
Assigned female at birth, Zisin initially came out as a lesbian at the age of 15, became a queer activist, and appeared in a documentary about gay teens, Love in Full Colour. Zisin struggled with anxiety and depression while striving to fit in at school.

At the age of 17, Zisin began transitioning to male. The teachers at Zisin's private Jewish school were supportive of the transition. Zisin started testosterone therapy in January 2014 during a gap year trip to Israel. Later, they came to identify as non-binary, and prefer gender-neutral singular they pronouns.

Zisin was featured in a teaching guide produced by Safe Schools Coalition Australia. They were targeted for this by the Australian Christian Lobby, and falsely accused of promoting sex reassignment surgery for minors without parental consent.

In May 2017, Zisin published a book about their gender transition and other life experiences, Finding Nevo: How I Confused Everyone. The Canberra Times described the book as "impactful" and "an enriching, worthwhile read for everyone". The Brisbane Times said that the book "leaves the reader with a deeper understanding of the arbitrariness of binary gender divisions and how they box us all in."

Zisin is critical of Zionism and has spoken publicly in support of Palestine.

== Publications ==
- Zisin, Nevo (1 May 2017). Finding Nevo. Black Dog Books. ISBN 9781925381184.
- Zisin, Nevo (1 March 2021). The Pronoun Lowdown. Smith Street Books. ISBN 9781925811803.
