= Ali K. Mulford =

New Zealand-American author

Ali K. Mulford (also known by their pen name A.K. Mulford) is an author of fantasy and romantic comedy. Mulford is best known for their Five Crowns of Okrith fantasy series, published by Harper Voyager. Mulford's books often prominently feature queer characters. In an interview with Dallas Voice, Mulford commented, "Growing up, I loved the [fantasy] genre, but it lacked diversity. Now I get to bring that fantasy nerd love while writing stories that reflect my experience."

Mulford is a US and New Zealand citizen, but now lives in Australia.

== Bibliography ==
=== The Five Crowns of Okrith ===
1. The High Mountain Court (2021)
2. The Witches' Blade (2021)
3. The Rogue Crown (2022)
4. The Evergreen Heir (2023)
5. The Amethyst Kingdom (2024)

=== The Okrith Novellas ===
1. The Witch of Crimson Arrows (2021)
2. The Witch Apothecary (2021)
3. The Witchslayer (2022)
4. The Witch's Goodbye (2023)
5. The Witching Trail (2024)

=== The Golden Court ===
1. A River of Golden Bones (2024)
2. A Sky of Emerald Stars (2024)
3. A Heart of Crimson Flame (2025)

=== Prickle Island Zoo ===
1. She's A Keeper (2024)
2. Easy Tiger (2024)
3. Party Animal (2024)
4. Crocodile Tears (2025)
5. Hold Your Horses (2026)

=== Maple Hollow ===
1. Pumpkin Spice & Poltergeist (2024; with K. Elle Morrison)
2. Curses & Cold Brew (2025; with K. Elle Morrison)

=== Other novels ===
- Dreamslayer (2026)
