= Richard LaFortune =

Two spirit activist, author, community organizer, and artist

- Born: 1960 (age 65–66); Bethel, Alaska, U.S.
- Other names: Anguksuar
- Occupations: activist, author, community organizer

Richard LaFortune, also known as Anguksuar (Yupik for Little Man), (born 1960 in Bethel, Alaska), is a two spirit activist, author, community organizer, and artist based in Minneapolis, Minnesota. LaFortune was an early organizer of the Native American LGBT community in the 1980s and co-founded the Two Spirit Press Room (2SPR).

In 1988, LaFortune helped to organize a meeting of LGBTQ Native Americans in Minnesota that later became the annual International Two Spirit Gathering. LaFortune began working in health and human services and by 1991 he served on the Governor's Task Force on Lesbian and Gay Minnesotans during the peak of the AIDS epidemic. In 1997, LaFortune continued his two spirit activism by writing a chapter in the book Two-Spirit People: Native American Gender Identity, Sexuality, and Spirituality which was acclaimed by scholars for its personal accounts and effort to change the anthropological narrative around two spirit people. LaFortune appeared in the 2009 PBS documentary, Two Spirit, that narrates the story of Fred Martinez, a two spirit teenager, and included interviews with many two spirit individuals.

== Early life ==
LaFortune was adopted by a white missionary couple from the Moravian church when he was less than a week old. but knows that his biological mother came from a lineage of Yupik medicine people and spiritual leaders. As a child LaFortune lived in Alberta, Canada and then a small town in upper Michigan. LaFortune was interested in music as a child and went on to study piano at Moravian College in Pennsylvania. From a young age LaFortune knew his "identity did not fit into a usual category of Western society," and as a young adult he remembers Native elders making comments to him "about the presence of third gender people in Native cultures."

== Start of activism ==
LaFortune first became an activist in 1979 following the Three Mile Island accident, which took place near Moravian College where he studied music. Following the accident LaFortune worked with anti-war and anti-nuclear weapon organizations in the 1970s. He later became the executive director of Honor the Earth, a Native American environmental justice organization. In the 1980s LaFortune immersed himself in the Native American communities of Ojibway, Dakota, Lakota, and Ho-Chunk people living in Minnesota and in the American gay community.

After seeing an advertisement in the gay magazine RFD, LaFortune traveled to San Francisco for several weeks to attend meetings of the Gay American Indians. He returned to Minneapolis and held the first Minneapolis meeting of LGBTQ Native Americans in 1988, which later became the International Two Spirit Gathering.

== Two Spirit activism ==
In 2005, LaFortune co-founded the Two Spirit Press Room (2SPR), a network of journalists and community leaders in the two spirit community. In an interview with the online newspaper NativeOut, LaFortune said the press room was meant to build "media literacy among Native GLBT communities and cultural literacy among journalists, so that the beliefs and stereotypes of non-Native people are no longer imposed upon us". One of the first actions of the Two Spirit Press Room was to publish a "Community Briefing Handbook", meant to educate the public about two spirit people.

Through a number of events, LaFortune gained increasing recognition in the Minneapolis community. In 2005, he was the first native person to lead the Twin Cities GLBT Pride Parade. In 2008, he was interviewed by the independent radio station KFAI, and in 2010, he was featured in the book Queer Twin Cities.

LaFortune served on the advisory board of the Tretter GLBT Collection, a part of the University of Minnesota Archives, and compiled over 250 documents for the collection. LaFortune was featured in the 2009 PBS documentary film, Two Spirt, directed by Lydia Nibley. In the film LaFortune speaks about the murder of Fred Martinez, a two spirit teenager, and about the history of discrimination against two spirit people in America.

== Writing ==
LaFortune wrote a chapter in the 1997 book Two-spirit People titled A Postcolonial Colonial Perspective on Western Mis Conceptions of the Cosmos and the Restoration of Indigenous Taxonomies. The book was reviewed by several anthropological journals and praised for its role in changing the narrative around two spirit people. Previous academic writing had used the now outdated term "berdache" to describe two spirit people often in terms of Western gender conceptions. One journal noted that LaFortune's section was "the most unique" because it gives a voice to two spirit people to "reflect on their experiences and express their concerns and desires,".

In 1999, LaFortune wrote a report on Native Languages as part of the Native Language Research Initiative with funding from the Grotto Foundation. The report describes how Native languages have been taught and preserved and recommends ways to continue their preservation. In 2010, LaFortune wrote an article for the Jewish-American magazine Tikkun about the history of organizing in the two spirit community.

== See also ==
- Jean-Nickolaus Tretter Collection in Gay, Lesbian, Bisexual and Transgender Studies
- Two-Spirit
