= Katherine Magdalene Rose =

Public personality and LGBTQ+ activist, author, and performer

Katherine Magdalene Rose (formerly known as Karekin Madteos Yarian) is an American transgender author and social activist from San Francisco. She was a member of the Episcopal religious community known as the Brotherhood of Saint Gregory from 1994, before coming out publicly as transgender in 2016. Rose is the author of In Love and Service Bound: The First Forty Years of the Brotherhood of Saint Gregory; The Skillfulness of Shepherds: Gregorian Reflections on the Spiritual Life and co-author of Equipping the Saints – two volumes currently used in the Brotherhood's formation program; and For the Balance of My Natural Life – a reflection on Life Vows in the Gregorian Way. She is also the subject of the award-winning documentary "Changing Habits" by Sara Needham, and has appeared in the nationally released via media series produced by Every Voice Network, an advocacy organization in the Episcopal Church for progressive causes.

Rose's work in San Francisco includes spiritual advocacy for members of the transgender community and political activism for LGBTQ+ causes. She is noted for her advocacy of Christian anarchism and a commitment to non-violent resistance. Her book "How To Be A Disciple and Digital" (as Yarian), a rudimentary ethics of faith on social media, was released in February 2018 by Church Publishing, Inc.

Her first full-length poetry collection, tribe: fire-songs, a series of poems reflecting on gender and sensuality was released on Amazon in February 2019. Another full length poetry edition, winter breviary: a poem of some reverence, a reflection on post-modern spiritual anxiety and the capacity for human violence, was also released shortly after. The following year, she released her most recent collection of poetry lauding the feminine title "she who willows among thorns".

== Personal life ==
Rose married Anthony Anchundo in 2008, just before the passage of Proposition 8 banned same-sex marriages in California.

On October 11, 2017, Rose publicly came out as transgender and non-binary for National Coming Out Day.

== Selected works ==
- Yarian, Karekin Madteos (2009). In Love and Service Bound: the First 40 Years of the Brotherhood of Saint Gregory. The Brotherhood of Saint Gregory.
- Yarian, Karekin M. (2018). How to Be a Disciple and Digital. Little Books of Guidance. New York, NY: Church Publishing. ISBN 978-1640650176.
- yarian, k. m. (2019). tribe: fire-songs. ISBN 978-1796308570.
