= Audre Lorde Project =

LGBT community and activism organization

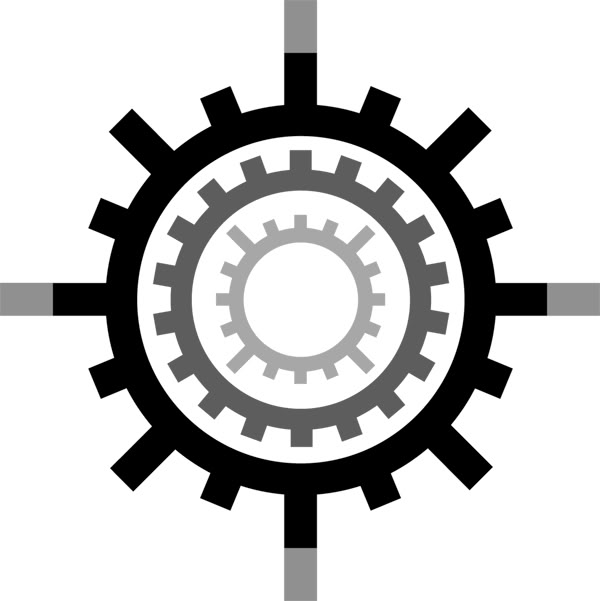
Audre Lorde Project logo

The Audre Lorde Project is a Brooklyn, New York–based organization for LGBTQ people of color. The organization concentrates on community organizing and radical nonviolent activism around progressive issues within New York City, especially relating to LGBTQ communities, AIDS and HIV activism, pro-immigrant activism, prison reform and organizing among youth of color. It is named for the lesbian-feminist poet and activist Audre Lorde and was founded in 1994.

== History ==
The purpose of the Project emerged from "the expressed need for innovative and unified community strategies to address the multiple issues impacting LGBT People of Color communities."

In 1996, the organization moved into its permanent home in the Fort Greene neighborhood of Brooklyn, parish house of Lafayette Avenue Presbyterian Church.

The Project was begun to "serve as a home base" for LGBT peoples of African/Black/Caribbean, Arab, Asian and Pacific Islander, Latina/o and Native/Indigenous descent can work to further a collective history of struggle against discrimination and other forms of oppression. At the time of its founding, it was the only organization in New York dedicated to people with an intersection of those identities.

=== Radical politics and nonviolence ===
The Project's decision-making structure seeks to be "representative of our communities" and acts to promote existing LGBT people of color organizations, cultural workers and activists. The organization also acts in an explicitly feminist, anti-sexist practice because it believes women's leadership "continues to be de-valued and discouraged in broader LGBTST organizations/communities." In the public arena, it often engages in nonviolent civil disobedience.

== Campaigns and Working Groups ==
=== Safe OUTside the System: the SOS Collective ===
The Collective is an anti-violence organization focusing on hate and police violence targeting "Lesbian, Gay, Bisexual, Two Spirit, Trans, and Gender Non Conforming people of color", in particular in the Bedford-Stuyvesant neighborhood of Brooklyn. The Collective uses community-based strategies, declaring that "strategies that increase the police presence and the criminalization of our communities do not create safety."

Originally called the Working Group on Police and State Violence, it began in 1997 in response to a rise in street violence and police harassment the organization believed was connected to the "quality of life" policies of Mayor Rudolph Giuliani.

The group helped to found the Coalition Against Police Brutality and People's Justice 2000 soon after the killings by police officers of unarmed men of color Amadou Diallo and Abner Louima, as well as annual Racial Justice Days, focusing on the appeals of families of color who suffered violence by the New York City Police Department.

The Collective manages the legal case for Jalea Lamot, a trans woman who was arrested and brutalized by New York City Housing Authority police.

As part of a broader anti-violence and anti-oppression approach, the Collective has collaborated with other progressive organizations, including the Rashawn Brazell Memorial Fund, the Third World Within-Peace Action Coalition, Racial Justice 911, Al-Fatiha Foundation and the American Friends Service Committee, following the terrorist attacks of 11 September 2001. The Collective's "war against terror meetings" focused on how homophobia and transphobia are a part of the policies of the United States' war on terror. Following the start of the Iraq War in 2003, SOS helped to coordinate Operation Homeland Resistance, civil disobedience protesting the war.

=== TransJustice ===
TransJustice is an advocacy organization created by and for trans and gender non-conforming people of color. The group focuses on trans-related policies in jobs, housing and health care, including job training programs, resisting transphobic violence, HIV services and trans-sensitive medical services.

=== Working Group on Immigrant Rights ===
The Working Group on Immigrant Rights consists of volunteers who are LGBT people of color born outside of the United States (including Puerto Rico). The working group seeks in particular to build the leadership of undocumented immigrants, low-wage workers and trans, two-spirit and gender non-conforming immigrants. Every campaign is required to be relevant to these "priority communities".

The group also places itself within the global justice and peace movements, and acts in solidarity with liberation struggles throughout the world. The working group's members "reject the us/them divide of citizens and foreigners, and are working toward a US foreign policy rooted in nonviolence, fair distribution of resources, and equity. We also recognize that the War on Terrorism is both a war abroad and a war at home, oppressing our communities in many places at once."

The organization went on record in 2006 as opposing the three-tier "path to legalization" legislation (the Comprehensive Immigration Reform Act) and guest worker programs, declaring that "full legalization is a nonnegotiable demand."

The group seeks to increase understanding of transphobia and homophobia within immigrants rights and social justice movements and immigrant communities within New York City.

In 2004, the working group published a report, "Communities at a Crossroads: U.S. Right Wing Policies and Lesbian, Gay, Bisexual, Two Spirit and Transgender Immigrants of Color in New York City".

=== Facilities Program ===
The Audre Lorde Project acts to "build capacity and support the organizational development" of LGBT people of color organizations by making available the Project's meeting space, office infrastructure and training as well as offering technical assistance, networking and coalition-building opportunities. Some of the groups that have met in the Project's meeting space "include African Ancestral Lesbians United for Societal Change (formerly the Salsa Soul Sisters), Arab and Iranian LBT Women’s Group (formerly Arab and Persian LBT Women’s Group), Asian Pacific Islander Coalition on HIV/AIDS (APICHA), Brooklyn Pride, Gay Men of African Descent (GMAD), Queer Koreans of New York, South Asian Lesbian and Gay Association (SALGA), Las Buenas Amigas, and Latino Gay Men of New York."

== Awards ==
In 2000, then-executive director Joo-Hyun Kang was awarded the Union Square Award from the Fund for the City of New York. In its award, the fund declared the Audre Lorde Project to be "an important cultural and information center in New York City."

A nationally recognized Black feminist and queer organizer, Cara Page, who received the Gay Reunion In Our Time (GRIOT) Circle Changemaker Award in 2025, also served as executive director of the Audre Lorde Project (ALP) from 2006 to 2010, during a pivotal period in its development.

== See also ==
- Audre Lorde
- Sylvia Rivera Law Project
- Black Radical Congress
- Critical Resistance
- The New York Foundation
