= Cris Judar =

Brazilian writer

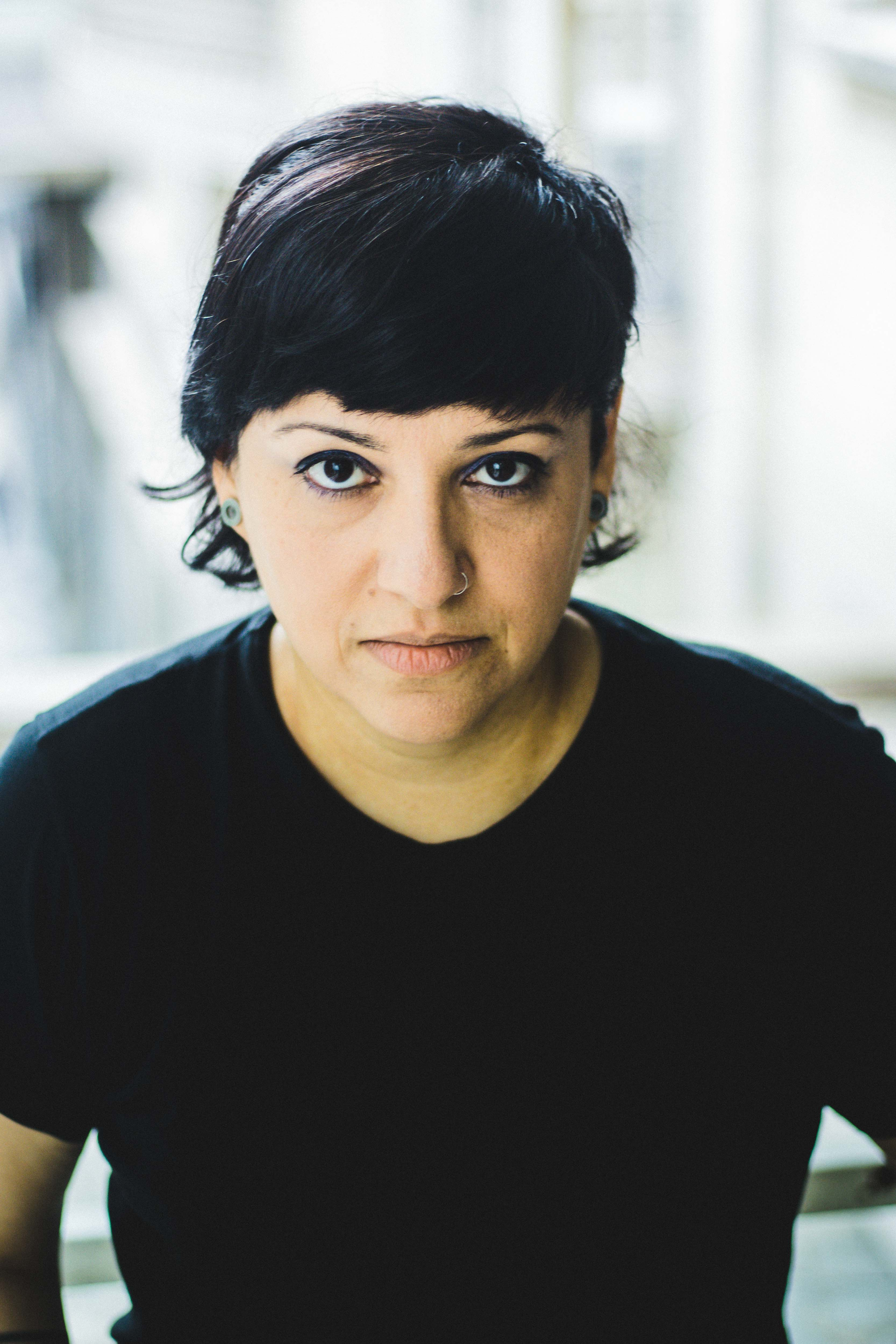
- Born: 29 May 1971; São Paulo
- Awards: São Paulo Prize for Literature

Cris Judar (born 1971) is a Brazilian writer. A native of São Paulo, they have published half a dozen books to date. Among these are the novels Oito do Sete (2017) and Elas marchavam sob o sol (2021). The former won the São Paulo Prize for Literature and was also a finalist for the Premio Jabuti.

== Personal life ==
Judar is non-binary, and uses gender-neutral pronouns.
