= Johanna Hedva =

American artist, writer, and musician

- Born: Johanna Randall Reed; May 5, 1984 (age 42)
- Education: University of California, Los Angeles (BA); California Institute of the Arts (MFA, MA)
- Website: johannahedva.com

Johanna Hedva (born 1984) is a Korean-American writer, artist, and musician. Their work spans literature, performance, music, and visual art, and frequently addresses disability, illness, grief, mysticism, and Ancient Greek myth. Hedva is the author of How to Tell When We Will Die (2024), Your Love Is Not Good (2023), Minerva the Miscarriage of the Brain (2020), and On Hell (2018). Their 2016 essay "Sick Woman Theory" has been widely translated.

== Early life and education ==
Hedva was born in 1984 in Santa Barbara, California. At age 22, Hedva began studying astrophysics at a city college before transferring two years later to UCLA to study design. After graduating with a Bachelor of Arts degree in design from UCLA in 2010, Hedva earned a Master of Fine Arts at the California Institute of the Arts in 2013, and a Master of Arts in Aesthetics and Politics at the California Institute of the Arts in 2014.

== Works ==
=== Books ===
==== On Hell ====
On Hell (Sator Press, 2018) is an experimental novel structured as a series of interviews between journalist Motherfuck and ex-convict Rafael Luis Estrada Requena. It follows his project of biohacking his own body in pursuit of flight. Hedva describes it as "a 21st-century version of Icarus, from a crip perspective." The novel's punctuation-free language was shaped by the leaked chatroom logs of the hacktivist collective LulzSec and the disclosures of Chelsea Manning and Edward Snowden. It was selected by Dennis Cooper as one of his favorite books of fiction for 2018.

==== Minerva the Miscarriage of the Brain ====
Minerva the Miscarriage of the Brain (Sming Sming and Wolfman Books, 2020) is a collection of poems, essays, plays, and photographic documentation of performances spanning a decade of Hedva's interdisciplinary practice. The book is bookended by Hedva's miscarriage in 2010 and the death of their mother a decade later. Springback wrote that it "feels like the artist is giving you a guided tour of their brain, showing you where all the memories are stored, where the juices flow, visiting the softest place inside of their bones and exiting through the guts."

==== Your Love Is Not Good ====
Your Love Is Not Good (And Other Stories, 2023) is a novel following an unnamed queer Korean American painter navigating the Los Angeles and Berlin art worlds, whose career is transformed by a series of portraits of a white model that sell out while drawing accusations of complicity in the very systems of racial exploitation the work meant to critique. Hedva conceived the novel as an experiment in "anti-autofiction," beginning with a narrator who shares their demographic identity but makes opposite ethical choices. ArtReview noted that the chapter titles, drawn from painterly techniques such as pentimento and trompe l'oeil, mirror the protagonist's psychological deterioration. It was named one of Kirkus Reviews' Best Fiction titles of 2023.

==== How to Tell When We Will Die ====
How to Tell When We Will Die: On Pain, Disability, and Doom (Zando & Hillman Grad, 2024) is a collection of essays examining chronic illness and disability through philosophy, astrology, kink, doom metal, and Ancient Greek tragedy, expanding on themes first introduced in Hedva's essay "Sick Woman Theory" (Mask Magazine, 2016). The book includes Hedva's Disability Access Rider, a document they began using when institutions invited them to speak following the circulation of "Sick Woman Theory", which outlines requirements for accessible events and which they describe as part of a broader call for institutional transformation around disability access. Across the essays, Hedva argues that disability is a universal condition and reframes need as a prerequisite for existence rather than a deficit. Publishers Weekly called it "probing and sophisticated," noting that Hedva's "philosophical takes on disability are consistently illuminating."

=== Performances ===
==== The Greek Cycle ====
The Greek Cycle (2012-2015) is a series of four plays written and directed by Hedva, adaptating of ancient Greek plays by Euripides and Homer to address feminist and queer political concerns, and began during a period marked by Hedva's miscarriage, divorce, mental health crisis, and involuntary hospitalization. Each play was performed in an unconventional location in Los Angeles: a hallway at CalArts, a moving Honda Odyssey minivan, an art museum, and Hedva's home in McArthur Park. Hedva has explained that they turned to Greek tragedy because its foundational role in Western makes it especially suited to feminist and queer reinterpretation.

==== Fist ====
Fist (2023-2025) is a solo performance work and forthcoming album developed with opera director George R. Miller. Hedva has described its music as “dominatrix blues,” combining folk, experimental vocal performance, and doom-inspired sound.

=== Music ===
==== The Sun and the Moon ====
The Sun and the Moon (self-released, 2019) is Hedva's debut studio album, comprising industrial compositions that sample the writings of Simone Weil. ArtReview describe it as "a black slurry of rich, harsh noise, industrial beats, and grainy samples" and "a celebration of darkness, an evocation of the swampy zone where the sacred and profane meet."

==== The Black Moon Lilith in Pisces in the 4th House ====
Black Moon Lilith in Pisces in the 4th House (Crystalline Morphologies and Sming Sming, 2021) is a solo album of voice and electric guitar created as a grief ritual following the death of Hedva's mother in 2018. Critics described the album as combining doom metal, Appalachian folk, Korean pansori, and ritual mourning traditions into an extended meditation on grief.

=== Visual art ===
Hedva's visual art has been exhibited internationally at museums, galleries, biennials, and festivals across Europe, North America, and Asia, including Gropius Bau and Haus der Kulturen der Welt in Berlin, Modern Art Oxford, Migros Museum of Contemporary Art in Zürich, MASS MoCA, and the Seoul Mediacity Biennale.

==== The Clock Is Always Wrong ====
The Clock Is Always Wrong (Gropius Bau, Berlin, 2022) was a site-specific installation comprising sculptures, drawings, and audio works alongside historical objects from the Wellcome Collection, exploring alternative ways of telling time outside capitalist chronology. Its central work, The Clock Is Always Wrong (Mouth), was an hourglass filled with black ink precisely calibrated to drain over the four-month duration of the exhibition and never function again.

==== If You're Reading This, I'm Already Dead ====
If You're Reading This, I'm Already Dead (JOAN, Los Angeles, 2023) was a solo exhibition comprising a multichannel sound installation, sculptures, and paintings incorporating the artist's hair, blood, and saliva, alongside AI-generated text and vocal clones trained on Hedva's voice. Frieze wrote that the exhibition created an immersive environment exploring Western conceptions of power and domination.

==== Genital Discomfort ====
Genital Discomfort (TINA, London, 2024) was a solo exhibition of new and existing works including film, works on paper incorporating ink, hair, and urethral sounds, textile works, and a mouth-blown glass sculpture filled with black goo that drained onto the gallery carpet over the course of the show. Reviewer Pavel Pyś selected it for his Artforum Top Ten, writing that Hedva transformed the gallery into "a shadowy, sulfuric-yellow environment" that was "nauseous, queasy, and altogether brilliant."

== Personal life ==
Hedva is genderqueer, and uses they/them pronouns.

== See also ==
- Disability studies
