= Jacob Tobia =

American activist & writer (born 1991)

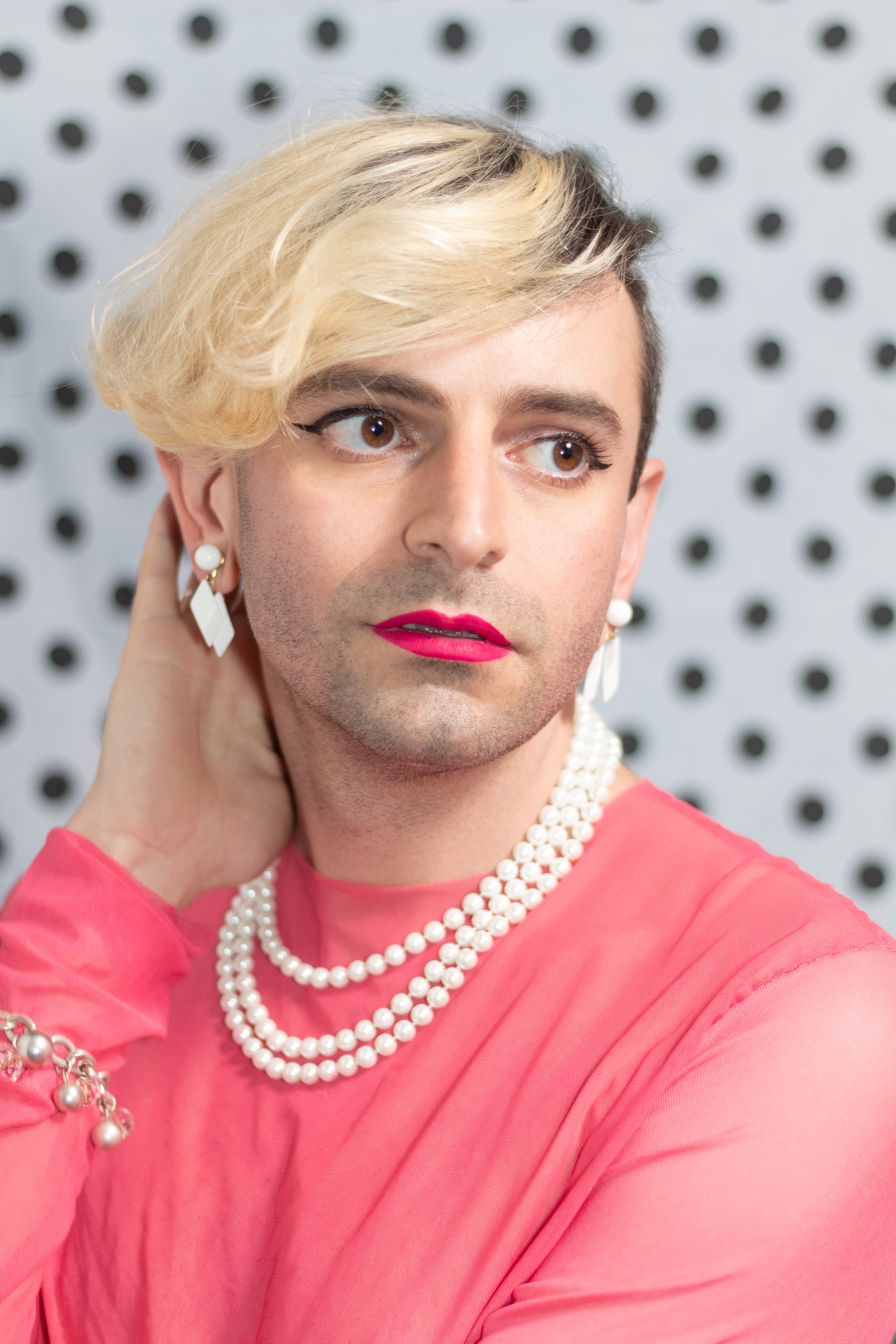
- Tobia in 2022
- Born: 1991 (age 34–35); Raleigh, North Carolina, U.S.
- Education: Raleigh Charter High School
- Alma mater: Duke University
- Occupations: Activist; writer; producer; television host; actor
- Website: jacobtobia.com

Jacob Tobia (born 1991) is an American activist, writer, producer, television host, and actor. In 2019, they (Note: Tobia is non-binary and uses they/them pronouns.) published their memoir titled Sissy: A Coming-of-Gender Story. They also provided the voice of Double Trouble in DreamWorks' animated series She-Ra and the Princesses of Power. Tobia has been recognized in Forbes 30 Under 30 and Out100.

== Early life and education ==
Tobia's grandparents were Syrians who immigrated to the United States in the 1950s and spoke Arabic, which Tobia says is "the language that I do not speak but wish I could." Tobia was raised in Raleigh, North Carolina and grew up in the United Methodist church. They graduated in 2010 from Raleigh Charter High School, serving as president of the Gay-Straight Alliance and being active in student government.

Tobia applied to Harvard University and was accepted, but chose to attend Duke University instead, where they graduated summa cum laude with a degree in Human Rights Advocacy. While a student at Duke, Tobia served as the vice president of equity and outreach for Duke Student Government, was co-president of Blue Devils United, and was president of Duke Students for Gender Neutrality.

== Career and activism ==
Tobia is a Point Foundation Scholar, Harry S. Truman Scholar, and a recipient of the Campus Pride National Voice and Action Award. Their writing has been featured on MSNBC, MTV, The Huffington Post, The Washington Post, The New York Times, The Guardian, BuzzFeed, Jezebel, and other media outlets. They also served on conference panels and spoken at Harvard University, Princeton University, Columbia University, and various LGBTQ conferences across the United States. They worked for the United Nations Foundation, the Human Rights Campaign, and the Astraea Lesbian Foundation for Justice before starting a career in television.

In September 2013, Tobia raised over $10,000 for the Ali Forney Center running across the Brooklyn Bridge in five-inch heels as part of their Clinton Global Initiative University (CGI U) commitment to action. They were recently honored again for their larger impact on the LGBTQIA+ community by CGI U in 2018 at the University of Chicago.

Tobia was featured in MTV's The T Word, where they were interviewed by Laverne Cox. In 2015, Tobia was profiled in the GLAAD Award-nominated episode of True Life: I'm Genderqueer by MTV. In 2016 they were named in Out's 100. Later in 2016, Tobia created, co-produced, and hosted Queer 2.0, an original LGBTQ series for NBC News.

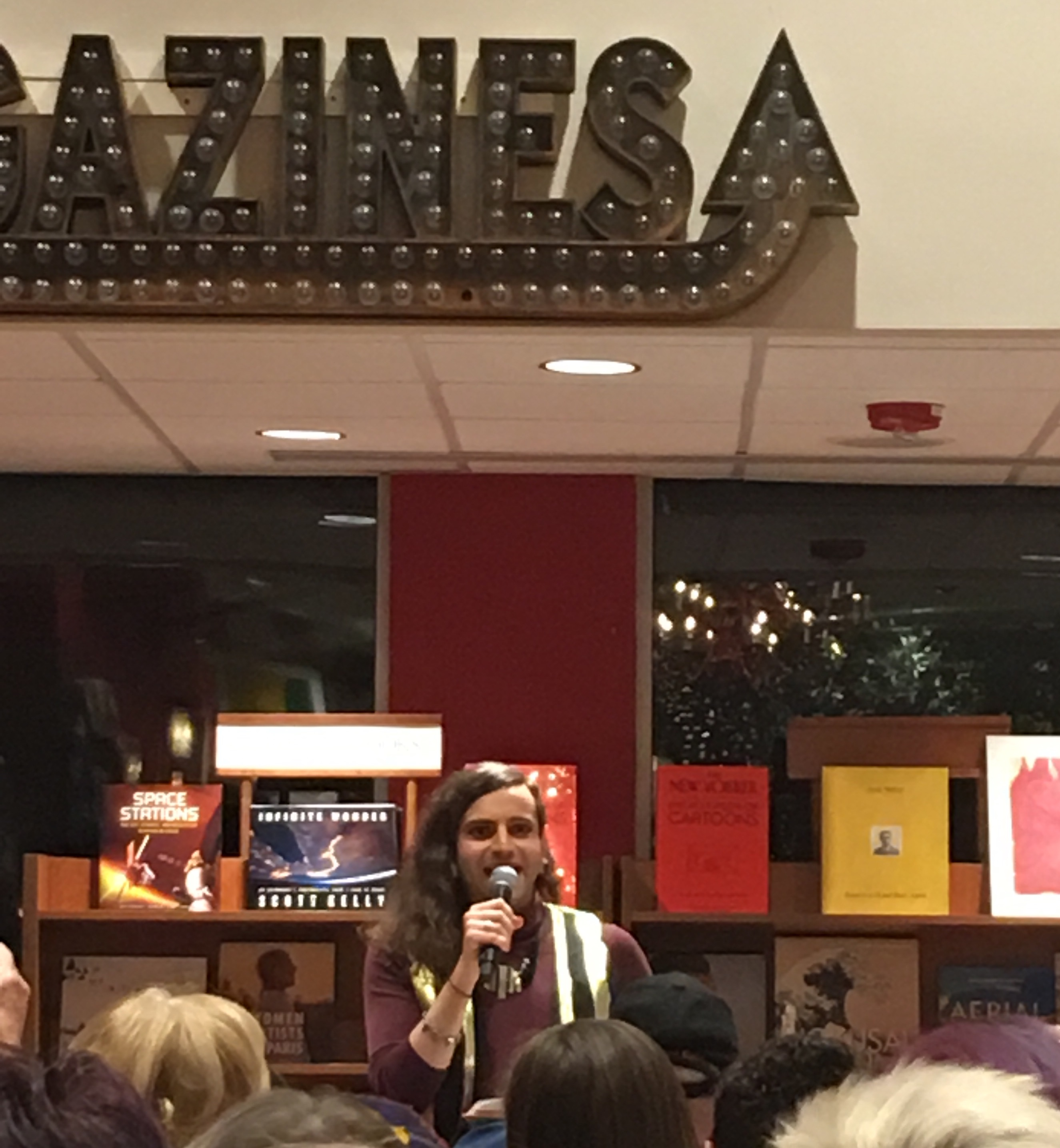
Tobia at a book reading in Raleigh, 2019

In 2017, Tobia moved from New York to Los Angeles to begin working on Season 4 of Joey Soloway's series Transparent. Tobia also provided the voice of Double Trouble in season 4 of She-Ra and the Princesses of Power.

In 2018, Tobia became the face of an advertising campaign for the gender non-conforming makeup brand Fluide, promoting a line of lip colors named after queer spaces, such as gay bars.

=== Sissy ===
In June 2017, Tobia announced the release of a memoir titled Sissy. The book sold in a six-figure deal to Putnam Books and was released in March 2019. Tobia was featured as a guest on Trevor Noah's The Daily Show to promote the book. They discussed the term "gender chill," gendered violence, and the playful nature of non-binary genders. Sissy was well-received by The New York Times Book Review, in which Sarah McBride wrote, "[Tobia] combines incisive wit and undeniable intelligence to invite readers into their journey as a gender-nonconforming young person in North Carolina...If Tobia aspires to the ranks of comic memoirists like David Sedaris and Mindy Kaling, Sissy succeeds."

In November 2019, Showtime announced they are developing a half-hour show based on Tobia's memoir Sissy: A Coming-of-Gender Story. Tobia will serve as co-writer and co-executive producer for the adaptation alongside Michael Lannan, the co-creator of the HBO series, Looking. The series will follow the life of Tobi Gibran, a non-binary student who moves from North Carolina to New York City.

== Personal life ==
Tobia is genderqueer and uses they/them pronouns.

== Published works ==
- Transgender Today: Jacob Tobia for The New York Times
- I am neither Mr, Mrs nor Ms but Mx for The Guardian
- Everything You Ever Wanted to Know About Gender-Neutral Pronouns for Motto by Time
- An Open Letter to North Carolina's Lawmakers from a Trans North Carolinian for Women's Health
- Telling Trans Stories Beyond 'Born in the Wrong Body for BuzzFeed
- I Have Long Nails Because I'm Proud Of What They Mean for BuzzFeed
- The 1970s Feminist Who Warned Against Leaning In for BuzzFeed
- An Affront against All Women for New America Weekly
- Trans Fashion is Not (Necessarily) Trans Empowerment for Hooligan Magazine
- How Student Activists at Duke Transformed a $6 Billion Endowment for The Nation
- Where I Belong for Duke Magazine
- LGBTQIA: A Beginner's Guide to the Great Alphabet Soup Of Queer Identity for Mic
- To All the Married Gay Couples Out There: The Fight Doesn't End With DOMA's Ruling for Mic
- Obama Morehouse Speech: Was the President Unintentionally Transphobic? for Mic
- The Power of Trans Vulnerability for The Huffington Post
- Five Dos and Five Don'ts for College Seniors (From a Point Scholar Who's Been There) for The Huffington Post
- Dear Mr. President: Students Ask Obama to Protect LGBT Employees for The Huffington Post
- Why You Should Be Optimistic After Amendment One: A North Carolinian's Perspective for The Huffington Post
- Why I'm Genderqueer, Professional and Unafraid for The Huffington Post
- The Orlando Shooting Was An Act Of Hate for MTV
- How To Talk To Your Parents About Being Genderqueer for MTV
- Sissy Diaries: The Harsh Realities of Dating for Gender-Nonconforming Femmes for Them
- I'm Genderqueer — Please Stop Asking Me When I'm 'Really' Going To Transition for MTV
- Jacob Tobia - Promoting a “Gender-Chill” Exploration of Identity with “Sissy” | The Daily Show with Trevor Noah
