= Samoan literature =

Samoan literature can be divided into oral (pre-colonial and post-colonial) and written literatures, in the Samoan language and in English or English translation, and is from the Samoa Islands of independent Samoa and American Samoa, and Samoan writers in diaspora. Samoan as a written language emerged after 1830 when Tahitian and English missionaries from the London Missionary Society, working with Samoan chiefly orators, developed a Latin script–based Samoan written language. Before this, there were logologo (tapa signs) and tatau (tattoo signs) but no phonetic written form.

Pre-colonial and post-colonial Samoan oral literature includes solo (poetic narratives), fa'alupega (genealogies), tala (histories and mythologies), fa'agogo (folk tales), pese (songs), and faleaitu theatre. Important solo were collected and published in Samoan and in translations by German scientist Augustin Kraemer working with Tofā Sauni and other Samoan orator chiefs, and English missionary scientist Thomas Powell from Tauanu'u of Manu'a, in the 19th century; and in the 20th century a major collection of fa'agogo or Fagogo were recorded and published by New Zealand–based ethnomusicologist Richard M. Moyle from faagogo storytellers throughout the Samoa Islands. Other collections of traditional Samoan stories were published in the 20th century by Teo Tuvale, Gatoloai Peseta Sio, Seiuli Le Tagaloatele Fitisemanu, and Daniel Pouesi.

The emergence of Samoan written literature (as distinct from oral literature) took place in the context of the development of indigenous Pacific Islander literature in the Pacific region as a whole, beginning in the late 1960s.

Albert Wendt's novel Sons for the Return Home, in 1973, was one of the first novels published by a Pacific Islander. Wendt subsequently published a number of novels, poems and plays—including Leaves of the Banyan Tree (1979) and The Songmaker’s Chair (2004)—and has become one of the South Pacific's best known writers. He was invested as a Companion of the Order of New Zealand for his services to literature in 2001. In 1980, Wendt edited Lali, the first anthology of South Pacific writing, which included works from fifty writers from the region.

The South Pacific Arts Society, founded at the University of the South Pacific in 1973, published Pacific Islander literature (poetry and short stories) in the magazine Pacific Islands Monthly. In 1974, the Society founded the publishing house Mana Publications, followed in 1976 by the art and literature journal Mana. Samoan poets Savea Sano Malifa, the founder of the award winning Samoa Observer newspaper, and artist Momoe Malietoa Von Reiche, first published their works through the Society. Other notable Samoan writers of their generation include poets Sapa'u Ruperake Petaia, and Eti Sa'aga.

Tuiatua Tupua Tamasese Efi was the prime minister of Samoa and later the head of state, and holds several royal chiefly titles of Samoa, but is also an important writer of Samoan culture and traditions, both in Samoan and English. His writing are widely read in the Samoan and Pacific Islander communities internationally in print and online.

Emma Kruse Va'ai, Pro Vice Chancellor at the National University of Samoa is a poet and published writer. Dr Sina Vaai is an established Professor of English Literature at National University of Samoa and a notable critic-writer, researcher, academician and published poet. Her published PhD research Literary Representations in Western Polynesia: Colonialism and Indigeneity (Samoa: National University, 1999) examines the postcolonial literature from Samoa, Tonga and Fiji; and there is a collection of her poems Lavoni Rains. Caroline Sinavaiana-Gabbard is another poet from American Samoa–based at University of Hawaii, who made a study of faleaitu plays.

Novelist and poet Sia Figiel ushered in a new era of Samoan literature in the 1990s. Figiel's novel Where We Once Belonged won the Commonwealth Prize for best first book for the Asia-Pacific region in 1997. Followed by Girl in the Moon Circle, Portrait of a Young Artist in Contemplation, and other novels and poetry collections. She influenced new generations of Samoan women writers including poets Tusiata Avia and Selina Tusitala Marsh, and novelist Lani Wendt Young.

Dan Taulapapa McMullin is a fa'afafine or LGBT writer and artist from American Samoa–based in New York, whose collection of poems Coconut Milk was on the American Library Association's 2013 Ten Best LGBT Books of the Year. Other Samoan LGBT writers include Victor Rodger in New Zealand, Brian Fuata of Australia and London, and lesbian playwright Kiana Rivera based in Hawaii. Non-binary writer Jenny Bennett-Tuionetoa was the winner of the 2018 Commonwealth Short Story Prize for the Pacific Region.
