= Faʻatama =

Third gender in Samoan culture

- Etymology: Samoan prefix faʻa-, meaning "in the manner of" + tama, meaning "boy"
- Classification: Gender identity

Other terms
- Synonyms: Faʻatane, fakatane, fakatama
- Associated terms: Faʻafafine, two-spirit, trans man, whakatāne, Māhū

Demographics
- Culture: Samoan
Regions with significant populations
- Polynesia

Faʻatama or fa’afatama (Samoan pronunciation: [faʔatama]; lit. 'in the manner of a man') are natal females who align with a third gender or masculine gender role in the Sāmoan Islands.

Faʻatama do not enjoy the same levels of acceptance as their Faʻafafine counterparts, but there is some growing support.

== Terminology ==
The word faʻatama includes the causative prefix faʻa–, meaning "in the manner of", and the word tama, meaning "boy", "young man", or "male" depending on context.

A precursor to the word faʻatama is the word faʻatane, though it has fallen out of use. It is a cognate of related words in other Polynesian languages, such as Cook Islands akava’ine, Niuen fakafifine, Tongan fakaleiti , and NZ Māori: whakawāhine.

Experts point out that Pacific island third and fourth genders, while non-binary, do not align neatly with similar Western concepts. While others explain that even the categorisation of faʻatama and faʻafafine as a third or fourth gender is a simplification of gender identity. There is also a preference among the community to use these traditional and established terms rather than Western terms in advocacy.

Together, faʻatama and faʻafafine constitute 1-5% of Samoa's population.

== Associations ==
=== Samoa Faʻafafine Association ===
The Samoa Faʻafafine Association (SFA) is the lead organisation in Samoa for LGBTQ+ communities.

The Rogers - Faʻatama Samoa
- Formation: 2018
- Headquarters: Apia, Samoa
- President: 'Ice' Vanila Galumulivai Ualegalu Heather
- Website: The Rogers Club on Facebook

=== The Rogers Club ===
The Rogers Club is the first dedicated association of faʻatama. The group is named in honour of 'Mama Roger' (Toʻotoʻoaliʻi Roger Stanley, former president of the Samoa Faʻafafine Association, SFA). The group was subject of the short film The Rogers of Samoa (2020).

== Notable Faʻatama ==
- Vanila Galumulivai Ualegalu Heather (aka Mr. Ice) founder and president of The Rogers Club
- Zetta Tiatia, vice-president of The Rogers

== Faʻatama in poetry and fiction ==
- Faatane shooting pool in Apia bars, Fa‘a Fafine Poem Number Twenty-Two by Dan Taulapapa McMullin
- Matalasi by Jenny Bennett-Tuionetoa
