= Gender identity =

Personal sense of one's own gender

Gender identity is the personal sense of one's own gender. Gender identity can correspond to a person's assigned sex or can differ from it. In most individuals, the various biological determinants of sex are congruent and consistent with the individual's gender identity. Gender expression typically reflects a person's gender identity, but this is not always the case. While a person may express behaviors, attitudes, and appearances consistent with a particular gender role, such expression may not necessarily reflect their gender identity. The term gender identity was coined by psychiatry professor Robert J. Stoller in 1964 and popularized by psychologist John Money.

In most societies, there is a basic division between gender attributes associated with males and females, a gender binary to which most people adhere and which includes expectations of masculinity and femininity in all aspects of sex and gender: biological sex, gender identity, gender expression, and sexual orientation. Some people do not identify with some, or all, of the aspects of gender associated with their biological sex; some of those people are transgender, non-binary, or genderqueer. Some societies have third gender categories.

The 2012 book Introduction to Behavioral Science in Medicine says that with exceptions, "Gender identity develops surprisingly rapidly in the early childhood years, and in the majority of instances appears to become at least partially irreversible by the age of 3 or 4". The Endocrine Society has stated "Considerable scientific evidence has emerged demonstrating a durable biological element underlying gender identity. Individuals may make choices due to other factors in their lives, but there do not seem to be external forces that genuinely cause individuals to change gender identity." Social constructivists argue that gender identity, or the way it is expressed, are socially constructed, determined by cultural and social influences. Constructivism of this type is not necessarily incompatible with the existence of an innate gender identity, since it may be the expression of that gender that varies by culture.

== Age of formation ==
There are several theories about how and when gender identity forms, and studying the subject is difficult because children's immature language acquisition requires researchers to make assumptions from indirect evidence. John Money suggested children might have awareness of and attach some significance to gender as early as 18 months to 2 years; Lawrence Kohlberg argued that gender identity does not form until age 3. It is widely agreed that core gender identity is firmly formed by age 3. At this point, children can make firm statements about their gender and tend to choose activities and toys which are considered appropriate for their gender (such as dolls and painting for girls, and tools and rough-housing for boys), although they do not yet fully understand the implications of gender. After age three, it is extremely difficult to change gender identity.

Martin and Ruble conceptualize this process of development as three stages: (1) as toddlers and pre-schoolers, children learn about defined characteristics, which are socialized aspects of gender; (2) around the ages of five to seven years, identity is consolidated and becomes rigid; (3) after this "peak of rigidity", fluidity returns and socially defined gender roles relax somewhat. Barbara Newmann breaks it down into four parts: (1) understanding the concept of gender, (2) learning gender role standards and stereotypes, (3) identifying with parents, and (4) forming gender preference.

According to the United Nations Educational, Scientific and Cultural Organization (UNESCO) comprehensive sexuality education should raise awareness of topics such as gender and gender identity.

== Factors influencing formation ==
=== Nature versus nurture ===
Although the formation of gender identity is not completely understood, many factors have been suggested as influencing its development. In particular, the extent to which gender identity is determined by nurture (social environmental factors) versus biological factors (which may include non-social environmental factors) is at the core of the ongoing debate in psychology known as "nature versus nurture". There is increasing evidence that the brain is affected by the organizational role of hormones in utero, circulating sex hormones and the expression of certain genes.

Social factors which may influence gender identity include ideas regarding gender roles conveyed by family, authority figures, mass media, and other influential people in a child's life. The social learning theory posits that children furthermore develop their gender identity through observing and imitating gender-linked behaviors, and then being rewarded or punished for behaving that way, thus being shaped by the people surrounding them through trying to imitate and follow them.

Large-scale twin studies suggest that the development of both transgender and cisgender gender identities is due to genetic factors, with a small potential influence of unique environmental factor, and that "the heritability estimates are consistent with other behavioral and personality traits, which generally fall in the range of 30−60%." Other twin studies have, by contrast, found that genetic factors, non-shared environments and shared environments all play a role in shaping gender identity.

Currently, "a definitive biological predetermination of gender identity seems unlikely. Not a single biological factor, but multiple factors (i.e., biological, psychological, and social) appear to influence the development of gender identity."

==== Case of David Reimer and contrasting case ====
A well-known example in the nature-versus-nurture debate is the case of David Reimer, born in 1965, otherwise known as "John/Joan". As a baby, Reimer went through a faulty circumcision, losing his male genitalia. Psychologist John Money advised Reimer's parents to raise him as a girl. John Money was instrumental in the early research of gender identity, though he used the term gender role. He disagreed with the previous school of thought that gender was determined solely by biology. He argued that infants are born a blank slate and a parent could be able to decide their babies' gender. In Money's opinion, if the parent confidently raised their child as the opposite sex from earlier than age two, the child would believe that they were born that sex and act accordingly. Money believed that nurture could override nature.

Reimer underwent sex reassignment surgery at seventeen months and grew up as a girl, dressing in girl clothes and surrounded by girl toys. In the early 1970s, Money reported that Reimer's sex reassignment to female was a success, influencing the academic consensus toward the nurture hypothesis, and for the following 30 years, it became standard medical practice to reassign intersex infants and male infants with micropenises to female.

After Reimer tried to commit suicide at age 13, he was told that he had been born with male genitalia. Reimer stopped seeing Money, and underwent surgery to remove his breasts and reconstruct his genitals. In 1997, sexologist Milton Diamond published a follow-up, revealing that Reimer had rejected his female reassignment, and arguing against the blank slate hypothesis and infant sex reassignment in general.

Diamond was a longtime opponent of Money's theories. Diamond had contributed to research involving pregnant rats that showed hormones played a major role in the behavior of different sexes. The researchers in the lab would inject the pregnant rat with testosterone, which would then find its way to the baby's bloodstream. The females that were born had genitalia that looked like male genitalia. The females in the litter also behaved like male rats and would even try to mount other female rats, proving that biology played a major role in animal behavior.

One criticism of the Reimer case is that Reimer lost his penis at the age of eight months and underwent sex reassignment surgery at seventeen months, which possibly meant that Reimer had already been influenced by his socialization as a boy. Bradley et al. (1998) report the contrasting case of a 26-year-old woman with XY chromosomes whose penis was lost and who underwent sex reassignment surgery between two and seven months of age (substantially earlier than Reimer), whose parents were also more committed to raising their child as a girl than Reimer's, and who remained a woman into adulthood. She reported that she had been somewhat tomboyish during childhood, enjoying stereotypically masculine childhood toys and interests, although her childhood friends were girls. While she was bisexual, having had relationships with both men and women, she found women more sexually attractive and they featured more in her fantasies. Her job at the time of the study was a blue-collar occupation that was practiced almost exclusively by men. Griet Vandermassen argues that since these are the only two cases being documented in scientific literature, this makes it difficult to draw any firm conclusions from them about the origins of gender identity, particularly given the two cases reached different conclusions. However, Vandermassen also argued that transgender people support the idea of gender identity as being biologically rooted, as they do not identify with their anatomical sex despite being raised and their behaviour reinforced according to their anatomical sex.

==== Other cases ====
One study by Reiner et al. looked at fourteen genetic males who had suffered cloacal exstrophy and were thus raised as girls. Six of them changed their gender identity to male, five remained female and three had ambiguous gender identities (though two of them had declared they were male). All the subjects had moderate to marked interests and attitudes consistent with that of biological males. Another study, using data from a variety of cases from the 1970s to the early 2000s (including Reiner et al.), looked at males raised as females due to a variety of developmental disorders (penile agenesis, cloacal exstrophy or penile ablation). It found that 78% of those males raised as females were living as females. A minority of those raised as female later switched to male. However, none of the males raised as male switched their gender identity. Those still living as females still showed marked masculinisation of gender role behaviour and those old enough reported sexual attraction to women. The study's authors caution drawing any strong conclusions from it due to numerous methodological caveats which were a severe problem in studies of this nature. Rebelo et al. argue that the evidence in totality suggests that gender identity is neither determined entirely by childhood rearing nor entirely by biological factors.

=== Biological factors ===
Several prenatal biological factors, including genes and hormones, may affect gender identity. It has been suggested that gender identity is controlled by prenatal sex steroids, but this is hard to test because there is no way to study gender identity in animals. According to biologist Michael J. Ryan, gender identity is exclusive to humans.

In a position statement, the Endocrine Society stated:

The medical consensus in the late 20th century was that transgender and gender incongruent individuals suffered a mental health disorder termed "gender identity disorder". Gender identity was considered malleable and subject to external influences. Today, however, this attitude is no longer considered valid. Considerable scientific evidence has emerged demonstrating a durable biological element underlying gender identity. Individuals may make choices due to other factors in their lives, but there do not seem to be external forces that genuinely cause individuals to change gender identity.

The causes of variation in gender identity can, in addition to examining biological proximate causations, also be studied by examining evolutionary causation. It has been suggested that gender identity variation is among the myriad of advantages provided by sexual reproduction in generating a broad diversity of phenotypes.

==== Transgender and transsexuality ====
Some studies have investigated whether there is a link between biological variables and transgender or transsexual identity. Several studies have shown that sexually dimorphic brain structures in transsexuals are shifted away from what is associated with their birth sex and towards what is associated with their preferred sex. The volume of the central subdivision of the bed nucleus of the stria terminalis or BSTc (a constituent of the basal ganglia of the brain which is affected by prenatal androgens) of transsexual women has been suggested to be similar to women's and unlike men's, but the relationship between BSTc volume and gender identity is still unclear. Similar brain structure differences have been noted between gay and heterosexual men, and between lesbian and heterosexual women. Transsexuality has a genetic component.

Research suggests that the same hormones that promote the differentiation of sex organs in utero also elicit puberty and influence the development of gender identity. Different amounts of these male or female sex hormones can result in behavior and external genitalia that do not match the norm of their sex assigned at birth, and in acting and looking like their identified gender.

==== Intersex people ====
Estimates of the number of people who are intersex range from 0.018% to 1.7%, depending on which conditions are counted as intersex. An intersex person is one possessing any of several variations in sex characteristics including chromosomes, gonads, sex hormones, or genitals that, according to the United Nations Office of the High Commissioner for Human Rights, "do not fit typical binary notions of male or female bodies". An intersex variation may complicate initial sex assignment and that assignment may not be consistent with the child's future gender identity. Reinforcing sex assignments through surgical and hormonal means may violate the individual's rights.

A 2005 study on the gender identity outcomes of female-raised 46,XY persons with penile agenesis, cloacal exstrophy of the bladder, or penile ablation, found that 78% of the study subjects were living as female, as opposed to 22% who decided to initiate a sex change to male in line with their genetic sex. The study concludes: "The findings clearly indicate an increased risk of later patient-initiated gender re-assignment to male after female assignment in infancy or early childhood, but are nevertheless incompatible with the notion of a full determination of core gender identity by prenatal androgens."

A 2012 clinical review paper found that between 8.5% and 20% of people with intersex variations experienced gender dysphoria. Sociological research in Australia, a country with a third 'X' sex classification, shows that 19% of people born with atypical sex characteristics selected an "X" or "other" option, while 52% are women, 23% men, and 6% unsure. At birth, 52% of persons in the study were assigned female, and 41% were assigned male.

A study by Reiner & Gearhart provides some insight into what can happen when genetically male children with cloacal exstrophy are sexually assigned female and raised as girls, according to an 'optimal gender policy' developed by John Money: in a sample of 14 children, follow-up between the ages of 5 and 12 showed that 8 of them identified as boys, and all of the subjects had at least moderately male-typical attitudes and interests, providing support for the argument that genetic variables affect gender identity and behavior independent of socialization.

=== Social and environmental factors ===
In 1955, John Money proposed that gender identity was malleable and determined by whether a child was raised as male or female in early childhood. Money's hypothesis has since been discredited, but scholars have continued to study the effect of social factors on gender identity formation. In the 1960s and 1970s, factors such as the absence of a father, a mother's wish for a daughter, or parental reinforcement patterns were suggested as influences; more recent theories suggesting that parental psychopathology might partly influence gender identity formation have received only minimal empirical evidence, with a 2004 article noting that "solid evidence for the importance of postnatal social factors is lacking." A 2008 study found that the parents of gender-dysphoric children showed no signs of psychopathological issues aside from mild depression in the mothers. It has also been suggested that the attitudes of the child's parents may affect the child's gender identity, although evidence is minimal.

==== Parental establishment of gender roles ====
Parents who do not support gender nonconformity are more likely to have children with firmer and stricter views on gender identity and gender roles. Recent literature suggests a trend towards less well-defined gender roles and identities, as studies of the parental association ("coding") of toys as masculine, feminine, or neutral indicate that parents increasingly code kitchens and in some cases dolls as neutral rather than exclusively feminine. However, Emily Kane found that many parents still showed negative responses to items, activities, or attributes that were considered feminine, such as domestic skills, nurturance, and empathy. Research has indicated that many parents attempt to define gender for their sons in a manner that distances the sons from femininity, with Kane stating that "the parental boundary maintenance work evident for sons represents a crucial obstacle limiting boys' options, separating boys from girls, devaluing activities marked as feminine for both boys and girls, and thus bolstering gender inequality and heteronormativity."

Many parents form gendered expectations for their child before it is even born, after determining the child's sex through technology such as ultrasound. The child thus is born to a gender-specific name, games, and even ambitions. Once the child's sex is determined, most children are raised in accordance with it, fitting a male or female gender role defined partly by the parents.

When considering the parents' social class, lower-class families typically hold traditional gender roles, where the father works and the mother, who may only work out of financial necessity, still takes care of the household. However, middle-class "professional" couples typically negotiate the division of labor and hold an egalitarian ideology. These different views on gender can shape the child's understanding of gender as well as the child's development of gender.

A study conducted by Hillary Halpern demonstrated that parental gender behaviors, rather than beliefs, are better predictors of a child's attitude on gender. A mother's behavior was especially influential on a child's assumptions of the child's own gender. For example, mothers who practiced more traditional behaviors around their children resulted in the son displaying fewer stereotypes of male roles while the daughter displayed more stereotypes of female roles. No correlation was found between a father's behavior and his children's knowledge of stereotypes of their own gender. Fathers who held the belief of equality between the sexes had children, especially sons, who displayed fewer preconceptions of their opposite gender.

== Gender variance and non-conformance ==
Gender identity can lead to societal security issues among individuals that do not fit on a binary scale. As of 2022, in the United States, only 23 states plus Washington D.C. currently have state laws that explicitly prohibit discrimination based on sexual orientation and gender identity. Moreover, only "53% of [the] LGBTQ population live in states prohibiting housing discrimination based on sexual orientation and gender identity", while "17% of [the] LGBTQ population lives in states explicitly interpreting existing prohibition on sex discrimination to include sexual orientation and/or gender identity". In some cases, a person's gender identity is inconsistent with their biological sex characteristics (genitals and secondary sex characteristics), resulting in individuals dressing and/or behaving in a way which is perceived by others as outside cultural gender norms. These gender expressions may be described as gender variant, transgender, or genderqueer (or non-binary) (there is an emerging vocabulary for those who defy traditional gender identity), and people who have such expressions may experience gender dysphoria (traditionally called gender identity disorder or GID). Transgender individuals are often greatly affected by language and gender pronouns before, during, and after their transition.

Some people who experience gender dysphoria seek sex reassignment surgery to have their physiological sex match their gender identity; others retain the genitalia they were born with (see transsexual for some of the possible reasons) but adopt a gender role that is consistent with their gender identity. Although sex reassignment surgery is expected to become more popular, the surgery is still not destigmatized in a lot of countries, including the United States. Such stigmatization has been shown to have adverse health effects on LGBTQ+ individuals, especially during the COVID-19 pandemic.

== History and definitions ==
=== Definitions ===
The terms gender identity and core gender identity were first used with their current meaning—one's personal experience of one's own gender—sometime in the 1960s. To this day they are usually used in that sense, though a few scholars additionally use the term to refer to the sexual orientation and sexual identity categories gay, lesbian and bisexual. Gender expression is distinct from gender identity in that gender expression is how one chooses to outwardly express their gender through one's "name, pronouns, clothing, hair style, behavior, voice or body features." It is thus distinct from gender identity in that it is the external expression of gender but may not necessarily portray a person's gender identity and may vary "according to racial/ethnic background, socio-economic status and place of residence."

=== Early medical literature ===
In late-19th-century medical literature, women who chose not to conform to their expected gender roles were called "inverts", and they were portrayed as having an interest in knowledge and learning, and a "dislike and sometimes incapacity for needlework". During the mid-1900s, doctors pushed for corrective therapy on such women and children, which meant that gender behaviors that were not part of the norm would be punished and changed. The aim of this therapy was to push children back to their "correct" gender roles and thereby limit the number of children who became transgender.

=== Freud and Jung's views ===
In 1905, Sigmund Freud presented his theory of psychosexual development in Three Essays on the Theory of Sexuality, giving evidence that in the pregenital phase children do not distinguish between sexes, but assume both parents have the same genitalia and reproductive powers. On this basis, he argued that bisexuality was the original sexual orientation and that heterosexuality was resultant of repression during the phallic stage, at which point gender identity became ascertainable. According to Freud, during this stage, children developed an Oedipus complex where they had sexual fantasies for the parent ascribed the opposite gender and hatred for the parent ascribed the same gender, and this hatred transformed into (unconscious) transference and (conscious) identification with the hated parent who both exemplified a model to appease sexual impulses and threatened to castrate the child's power to appease sexual impulses. In 1913, Carl Jung proposed the Electra complex as he both believed that bisexuality did not lie at the origin of psychic life, and that Freud did not give adequate description to the female child (Freud rejected this suggestion).

=== 1950s and 1960s ===
During the 1950s and '60s, psychologists began studying gender development in young children, partially in an effort to understand the origins of homosexuality (which was viewed as a mental disorder at the time). In 1958, the Gender Identity Research Project was established at the UCLA Medical Center for the study of intersex and transsexual individuals. Psychoanalyst Robert Stoller generalized many of the findings of the project in his book Sex and Gender: On the Development of Masculinity and Femininity (1968). He is also credited with introducing the term gender identity to the International Psychoanalytic Congress in Stockholm, Sweden, in 1963. Behavioral psychologist John Money was also instrumental in the development of early theories of gender identity. His work at Johns Hopkins Gender Identity Clinic (established in 1965) popularized an interactionist theory of gender identity, suggesting that, up to a certain age, gender identity is relatively fluid and subject to constant negotiation. His book Man and Woman, Boy and Girl (1972) became widely used as a college textbook, although many of Money's ideas have since been challenged.

== Present views ==
=== Medical field ===
Transgender people sometimes wish to undergo physical surgery to refashion their primary sexual characteristics, secondary characteristics, or both, because they feel they will be more comfortable with different genitalia. This may involve removal of penis, testicles or breasts, or the fashioning of a penis, vagina or breasts. In the past, sex assignment surgery has been performed on infants who are born with ambiguous genitalia. However, current medical opinion is strongly against this procedure on infants, and recommends that the procedure be only conducted when medically necessary. Today, gender-affirming surgery is performed on people who choose to transition so that their external sexual organs will match their gender identity.

In the United States, the Affordable Care Act provided that health insurance exchanges would have the ability to collect demographic information on gender identity and sexual identity through optional questions, to help policymakers better recognize the needs of the LGBTQ community. In 2020, however, the Trump administration finalized a rule that "would remove nondiscrimination protections for LGBTQ people when it comes to health care and health insurance" in the Affordable Care Act and extends to "regulations pertaining to access to health insurance." This rule "is one of the many rules and regulations put forward by the Trump administration that defines "sex discrimination" as only applying when someone faces discrimination for being male or female, and does not protect people from discrimination on the basis of sexual orientation or gender identity."

==== Gender dysphoria and gender identity disorder ====
Gender dysphoria (previously called "gender identity disorder" or GID in the Diagnostic and Statistical Manual of Mental Disorders or DSM) is the formal diagnosis of people who experience significant dysphoria (discontent) with the sex they were assigned at birth and/or the gender roles associated with that sex: "In gender identity disorder, there is discordance between the natal sex of one's external genitalia and the brain coding of one's gender as masculine or feminine." The DSM (302.85) has five criteria that must be met before a diagnosis of gender identity disorder can be made, and the disorder is further subdivided into specific diagnoses based on age, for example gender identity disorder in children (for children who experience gender dysphoria).

The concept of gender identity appeared in the third edition of the DSM, DSM-III (1980), in the form of two psychiatric diagnoses of gender dysphoria: gender identity disorder of childhood (GIDC), and transsexualism (for adolescents and adults). The 1987 revision of the manual, DSM-III-R, added a third diagnosis: gender identity disorder of adolescence and adulthood, nontranssexual type. This latter diagnosis was removed in the subsequent revision, DSM-IV (1994), which also collapsed GIDC and transsexualism into a new diagnosis of gender identity disorder. In 2013, the DSM-5 renamed the diagnosis gender dysphoria and revised its definition.

The authors of a 2005 academic paper questioned the classification of gender identity problems as a mental disorder, speculating that certain DSM revisions may have been made on a tit-for-tat basis when certain groups were pushing for the removal of homosexuality as a disorder. This remains controversial, although the vast majority of today's mental health professionals follow and agree with the current DSM classifications. In recent years, however, there has been a "growing chorus of voices contesting the pathologization of transgender lives and the dominance of medical-scientific narratives about trans experience." As such, in 2019, the World Health Organization removed gender dysphoria from the mental illness chapter and moved it instead to the sexual health chapter, changing the term "Gender Dysphoria" to "Gender Incongruence", thereby removing gender dysphoria as a pathological mental illness.

=== International human rights law ===
The Yogyakarta Principles, a document on the application of international human rights law, provide in the preamble a definition of gender identity as each person's deeply felt internal and individual experience of gender, which may not correspond with the sex assigned at birth, including the person's sense of the body (which may involve, if freely chosen, modification of bodily appearance or function by medical, surgical or other means) and other experience of gender, including dress, speech and mannerism. Principle 3 states that "Each person's self-defined [...] gender identity is integral to their personality and is one of the most basic aspects of self-determination, dignity and freedom. No one shall be forced to undergo medical procedures, including sex reassignment surgery, sterilisation or hormonal therapy, as a requirement for legal recognition of their gender identity." Principle 18 states that "Notwithstanding any classifications to the contrary, a person's sexual orientation and gender identity are not, in and of themselves, medical conditions and are not to be treated, cured or suppressed." Relating to this principle, the "Jurisprudential Annotations to the Yogyakarta Principles" observed that "Gender identity differing from that assigned at birth, or socially rejected gender expression, have been treated as a form of mental illness. The pathologization of difference has led to gender-transgressive children and adolescents being confined in psychiatric institutions, and subjected to aversion techniques – including electroshock therapy – as a 'cure'." The "Yogyakarta Principles in Action" says "while 'sexual orientation' has been declassified as a mental illness in many countries, 'gender identity' or 'gender identity disorder' often remains in consideration." These Principles influenced the UN declaration on sexual orientation and gender identity. In 2015, gender identity was part of the United States Supreme Court case Obergefell v. Hodges in which marriage was no longer legally restricted to be only between a man and a woman.

=== Gender studies ===
In the late 1980s, gender studies scholar Judith Butler began lecturing regularly on the topic of gender identity, and in 1990, they published Gender Trouble: Feminism and the Subversion of Identity. The work introduced the concept of gender performativity, which unites performativity and gender. Butler argues that the traditional view of gender is limiting in that it adheres to the dominant societal constraints that label gender as binary. In their anti-essentialist framework, gender identity does not precede gender expression, but is an effect of it.

=== Opposing views ===
The anti-gender movement is a global phenomenon that opposes concepts often referred to as "gender ideology" or "gender theory". These loosely defined terms are commonly used by the movement to critique a range of issues related to gender equality, LGBT rights, and gender studies, including the validity of the concept of gender identity itself.

Originating in the late 20th century, the movement has drawn support from right-wing populist groups, conservative religious organizations, and social conservatives and the far-right worldwide. It views advances in gender inclusion and LGBT rights as threats to traditional family structures, religious values, and established social norms. The movement has been criticized for promoting discrimination and undermining human rights protections, particularly those concerning individuals with diverse gender identities and sexual orientations. Critics argue that it employs misinformation to delegitimize efforts toward gender inclusion and has been described as a form of moral panic or conspiracy theory.

A type of anti-gender rhetoric where people are ascribed a gender that does not match their gender identity is called misgendering. One example of misgendering is deadnaming, i.e., using a pre-transition name for someone instead of a post-transition one.

== Measurement ==
No objective measurement or imaging of the human body exists for gender identity, as it is part of one's subjective experience. Numerous clinical measurements for assessing gender identity exist, including questionnaire-based, interview-based and task-based assessments. These have varying effect sizes among a number of specific sub-populations. Gender identity measures have been applied in clinical assessment studies of people with gender dysphoria or intersex conditions.

== Terminology ==
Before the § 1950s and 1960s, the term gender was used exclusively as a grammatical category. The terms male and man, or female and woman, were used more or less interchangeably when referring to people of one sex or the other. As the term gender took on new meaning following the work of John Money, Robert Stoller, and others, a distinction began to be drawn between the terms sex and gender. As a result of the new understanding of gender, academic usage of the term sex began to be more restricted to biological aspects, and associated with the choices male and female, while the term gender was associated initially with man or boy, girl or woman.

=== Binary gender identities ===
While academic usage of terms man and woman began to diverge at the same time, and become more restricted to concepts related to gender, this distinction was not universal (and still is not) even in academic usage, and even less so in more informal writing or in speech, which often conflate the two.

=== Non-binary gender identities ===
Some people, and some societies, do not construct gender as a binary in which everyone is either a boy or a girl, or a man or a woman. Those who exist outside the binary fall under the umbrella terms non-binary or genderqueer. Some cultures have specific gender roles that are distinct from "man" and "woman". These are often referred to as third genders.

==== Fa'afafine ====
In Samoan culture, or Faʻa Samoa, fa'afafine are considered to be a third gender. They are anatomically male but dress and behave in a manner considered typically feminine. According to Tamasailau Sua'ali'i (see references), fa'afafine in Samoa at least are often physiologically unable to reproduce. Fa'afafine are accepted as a natural gender, and neither looked down upon nor discriminated against. Fa'afafine also reinforce their femininity with the fact that they are only attracted to and receive sexual attention from straight masculine men. They have been and generally still are initially identified in terms of labour preferences, as they perform typically feminine household tasks. The Samoan Prime Minister is patron of the Samoa Fa'afafine Association. Translated literally, fa'afafine means "in the manner of a woman".

==== Hijras ====
Hijras are officially recognized as third gender in the Indian subcontinent, being considered neither completely male nor female. Hijras have a recorded history in the Indian subcontinent since antiquity, as suggested by the Kama Sutra. Many hijras live in well-defined and organised all-hijra communities, led by a guru. These communities have consisted over generations of those who are in abject poverty or who have been rejected by or fled their family of origin. Many work as sex workers for survival.

The word "hijra" is a Hindustani word. It has traditionally been translated into English as "eunuch" or "hermaphrodite", where "the irregularity of the male genitalia is central to the definition". However, in general hijras are born male, only a few having been born with intersex variations. Some hijras undergo an initiation rite into the hijra community called nirvaan, which involves the removal of the penis, scrotum, and testicles.

==== Khanith ====
The khanith form an accepted third gender in Oman. The khanith are male homosexual prostitutes whose dressing is male, featuring pastel colors (rather than white, worn by men), but their mannerisms are female. Khanith can mingle with women, and they often do at weddings or other formal events. Khaniths have their own households, performing all tasks (both male and female). However, similar to men in their society, khaniths can marry women, proving their masculinity by consummating the marriage. Should a divorce or death take place, these men can revert to their status as khaniths at the next wedding.

==== Two-spirit identities ====
Many indigenous North American Nations had more than two gender roles. Those who belong to the additional gender categories, beyond cisgender man and woman, are now often collectively termed "two-spirit" or "two-spirited". There are parts of the community that take "two-spirit" as a category over an identity itself, preferring to identify with culture or Nation-specific gender terms.

=== Gender modality ===
Gender modality is the relationship between one's gender in the sense of gender role and gender identity and the sex that they were assigned at birth. The term was first coined by Florence Ashley in 2019 to describe the "broad category which includes being trans[gender] and being cis[gender]." The term was intended to be analogous to sexual orientation and to allow "space to reflect on" the relationship between gender identity and gender assigned at birth for non-binary people, people of diverse cultural backgrounds, and people with dissociative identity disorder.

== See also ==
- List of gender identities
- Social construction of gender – Theory in feminism and sociology
- Identity (social science) – Qualities, beliefs, personality, looks and/or expressions that distinguish a person
- Sex and gender distinction
- Neuroscience of sex differences – Characteristics of the brain that differentiate the male brain and the female brain
- Postgenderism – Movement against gender roles
- Queer studies – Study of topics relating to sexual orientation and gender identity
- Queer theory – Field of critical theory
