= Amao =

Amao may refer to:

== People ==
=== Surname ===
- Ibilola Amao, Nigerian engineer
- Isiaka Oladayo Amao (born 1965), Chief of Air Staff of the Nigerian Air Force
- Yoshi Amao, Japanese actor, comedian, emcee, and martial artist

=== Given name ===
- Amao Leota Lu (born 1971), Samoan performance artist, poet and community activist
