= Miss Island Queen Pageant =

Pageant held annually in American Samoa

Miss S.O.F.I.A.S
- Formation: 1979
- Type: Beauty Pageant
- Location: Pago Pago, American Samoa
- Website: http://assofias.webs.com/

Miss Island Queen (now Miss SOFIAS) is a faʻafafine pageant held annually in American Samoa. It is noted for being the longest standing pageant of its kind in the South Pacific. It was first held in 1979 before undergoing a series of changes. No pageant was held in 1980 and 1982 as it endured shifts in ownership and in 2020 and 2022 due to the covid pandemic. It was canceled in 1986 due to a tropical cyclone and failed to take place in both 1999 and 2002 when it struggled with funding. In 1996 It was held simultaneously on the same evening as another faʻafafine pageant Empress of Samoa. In 2008 the pageant coincided with the Festival of Pacific Arts and became the closing event of festivities. After undergoing extensive reestablishment in 2010 the pageant has since been held during Flag Day week and broadcast live on KVZK-2. It is now known as Miss SOFIAS and maintains yearly advocacy and charity programs.

== History ==
The pageant began as a marketing show for Herb & Sia's motel, a family owned business, which, in its heyday, was a staple for Polynesian revues and local musicians. A gathering of faʻafafines shepherd by educators Leroy Lutu and Vena Sele led to pioneering the first fully organized beauty pageant in 1981. It came to prominence in the late 1980s when organizers incorporated educational awareness, community service and charitable causes in both American Samoa and neighboring Apia, Samoa. Governor A. P. Lutali was the first territorial leader to officially support the pageant in 1987 in years that followed numerous local dignitaries and politicians became fixtures at the event. The pageant was hugely successful by 1990 it spawned a faʻafafine performance troupe. The troupe entertained across the islands at public ceremonies and private events popularizing a streak of song and dance routines among them the apartheid anthem Gimme Hope Jo'anna, music from the soundtrack of Sarafina! and Samba in the night by Daniel Rae Costello many selections were opening themes of past island queen pageants. Power struggles corrupted the pageant in the mid-1990s resulting in the exploitation of faʻafafines in countless beauty pageants publicized for financial gain. Vena Sele and Leroy Lutu harbored creative differences and parted ways. Lutu went on to establish "Empresses of Samoa" and "Mizz Corona" pageants and Sele continued with Island Queens before leading "Miss American Sevens". American Sevens was originally operated under a netball association but at the height of its success became known as Seven Islands of American Samoa.

In the 2000s Miss American Sevens and Miss Island Queens pageants dominated the territory. In 2010 American Sevens and Island Queens communally retired uniting to become S.O.F.I.A.S (Society of Faʻafafine in American Samoa). Organizers also preserved history honoring past winners under its retooled name. Three distinctive awards were awarded during the history of both pageants. In 2000 high chief Tiumalu Sia Scanlan was presented with a special award, in 2006 longtime serving member Rosie Moimoi was recognized by Island Queens and in 2005 founder Vena Sele was honored by the American Sevens for her legacy and service to both the faʻafafine community and her pioneering career. Sele was the first fa'afafine to earn a doctorate degree, for a short term Sele was president of American Samoa Community College becoming the highest ranking fa'afafine at the time. Sele retired in 2005 and in 2007 published her autobiography "Memoirs of a Samoan, Catholic and Fa’afafine". Sele is widely known to have inspired many fa'afafines to pursue education many of whom affectionately call her "Mama". Sele lives in Tacoma, WA. Leroy Lutu rose to great success with the Department of Education and retired in 2011. He was a popular local personality well known for his fashionable taste and socialite status. In 2008 both Sele and Lutu returned for the 25th anniversary of Miss Island Queens it was their last time together on stage. Lutu died in 2012.

== Notable contestants and winners ==
- Cindy Filo was 3rd runner up in 1987's Miss Island Queen. Filo became “Cindy of Samoa” Samoa's first ever faʻafafine celebrity attracting tourism and fans for her drag revues in Apia. Filo toured her shows across the South Pacific and the United States. Cindy was profiled in Heather Croall's 1999 documentary Paradise Bent: Boys Will Be Girls in Samoa. In 2008 Cindy was a finalist on the New Zealand reality show Stars in Their Eyes. She is profiled in Te Ara: The Encyclopedia of New Zealand section on faʻafafine.
- Michelle Eneliko was a prolific local educator who was 1st runner-up for Miss Island Queen 1990. Eneliko was among the fatality victims of the Samoa tsunami that devastated the Samoan islands on September 29, 2009.
- Miss Island Queen 1993, Shalimar (Atisone Seiuli) gained national media exposure in 1997 when she was arrested while in the company of Hollywood star Eddie Murphy. The incident was publicized by tabloid magazines, TV shows and parodied on Mad TV and SNL resulting in several lawsuits brought on by Murphy and his lawyers. Seiuli died in Los Angeles reportedly in an accidental fall from her apartment building in 1998. In 2003 the scandal was ranked #61 on E! TV's "The Greatest Shocking Moments in Entertainment History".
- Rachael Ng Lam Miss Island Queen 1995 appeared in the 2011 sequel to the popular Samoan film “Tautoga Gaosia” playing herself.
- Miss Island Queen 1992 Loata Sipili is currently the highest ranking faʻafafine in American Samoa. Sipili is the only locally Certified Diabetes Educator (CDE) and administers the diabetes care and prevention clinic within LBJ Tropical Medical Center the territory's only hospital.

== Past winners ==
Miss Island Queen titleholders include:

Year	Miss Island Queen	Hometown Village	Age	Host Venue
1979	Nancy Olo	Fagatogo	19	Herb & Sia's Motel
1981	Marsha Mageo	Taputimu	17	Herb & Sia's Motel
1983	Tanya Laumoli	Vailoatai	29	Tumua Palace Nightclub
1984	Rexinne Yandall	Atu'u	22	Tumua Palace Nightclub
1985	Shevon Matai	Fagatogo	17	Herb & Sia's Motel
1987	Tasha Le Atio'o	Fagatogo	19	Rainmaker Hotel
1988	Stacie Titiali'i	Alofau	22	Rainmaker Hotel
1989	Julie McEntire (Meleiseā)	Leloaloa	21	Rainmaker Hotel
1990	Danielle Mose	Atu'u	25	Rainmaker Hotel
1991	Cherylmoanamarie 'Cherie' Ripley	Leone	38	Rainmaker Hotel
1992	Loata Sipili	Ili’ili	37	Rainmaker Hotel
1993	Atisone Shalimar Seiuli	Mapusaga	17	Rainmaker Hotel
1994	Hazel Wells (Talia)	Malaeloa	21	Rainmaker Hotel
1995	Rachael Ng Lam	Apia, Samoa	29	Rainmaker Hotel
1996	Ericha Thompson	Pago Pago	28	Governor Rex H. Lee Auditorium
1997	Tiffany Diaz (Potasi)	Fagatogo	22	Rainmaker Hotel
1998	Isabella Lorda Valentino	Apia, Samoa	25	Rainmaker Hotel
2000	Lei Cameron (Fatuesi)	Fagatogo	29	Pago Bay Restaurant
2001	Lydia Risati	Fagatogo	30	Rainmaker Hotel
2003	Pearl Mata'u	Afono	40	Governor Rex H. Lee Auditorium
2004	Sheena T. Willis (Ipi Ieli)	Aua	37	Maliu Mai Beach Resort
2005	Marion Malena (Mageo)	Pago Pago	20	Governor Rex H. Lee Auditorium
2006	Marlo Fuimaono	Aoloau	31	Governor Rex H. Lee Auditorium
2007	Bianca Yoshimiro (Miscoi)	Pago Pago	23	Pago Pago Community Center (Tautua Hall)
2008	Princess Arrianna Auva'a	Malaeloa	22	Pago Pago Community Center (Tautua Hall)
2009	Didi De'Barge (Afuafi)	Malaeloa	28	Tradewinds Hotel

Miss American Sevens titleholders include:

Year	Miss American 7s	Hometown Village	Age	Host Venue
1999	Shevon Matai	Fagatogo	31	Pago Bay Ball Restaurant
2000	Christina Robinson	Apia, Samoa		Rainmaker Hotel
2001	Tasha Le Atio‘o	Fagatogo	33	Governor Rex H. Lee Auditorium
2002	Mavis O’Connery (Mulitalo)	Apia, Samoa		Governor Rex H. Lee Auditorium
2003	Athena Mauga	Pago Pago	25	Maliu Mai Beach Resort
2004	Aysha Tomanogi	Nuʻuuli	25	Maliu Mai Beach Resort
2005	Lydia Risati	Fagatogo	33	Maliu Mai Beach Resort
2006	Shiki Leaupepetele	Atu'u	26	Governor Rex H. Lee Auditorium
2007	Marion Malena (Mageo)	Pago Pago	22	Governor Rex H. Lee Auditorium
2008	Trisyss Ali	Leone	17	Governor Rex H. Lee Auditorium
2009	Samayah Jackson (Tualaulelei)	Pago Pago	19	Tradewinds Hotel

S.O.F.I.A.S. titleholders:

Year	Miss S.O.F.I.A.S.	Hometown Village	Age	Host Venue
2010	Pearl Langkilde	Apia, Samoa		Tradewinds Hotel
2011	Trina Tui	Ili'ili	26	Tradewinds Hotel
2012	Tepatasi Vaina	Aoloau	25	Governor Rex H. Lee Auditorium
2013	Roberta Fierce Laumoli	Vailoatai	24	Governor Rex H. Lee Auditorium
2014	Saumaeafe Maya Aphrodite Blaque (Ierome)	Tula	38	Governor Rex H. Lee Auditorium
2015	Arykah Contess Fonoti	Aoloau & Aasu	33	Governor Rex H. Lee Auditorium
2016	Jayleen Von-Shmidt Chun	Leone	39	Governor Rex H. Lee Auditorium
2017	Eden Brown	Iliili	27	Governor Rex H. Lee Auditorium
2018	Valentana Faumuina	Leone	28	Governor Rex H. Lee Auditorium
2019	Vanessa Simanu Ta'amu	Utumea (East)	30	Fatuoaiga Catholic Hall
2021	Aruni Talaifaga	Nu’uuli	30	Governor Rex H. Lee Auditorium
2023	Christian Wright Sa’alea	Matu’u & Faganeanea	32	Department of Youth & Women's Affairs Gym, Tafuna

== Runners-Up [Miss SOFIAS Title] ==
Year	1st Runner Up	2nd Runner Up	3rd Runner Up	4th Runner Up
2010	Maya Aphrodite Blaque Jerome	Ara-Lei Mahealani Yandall	Kiesha Cole	Not Awarded
2011	Roberta Fierce Laumoli	Davina Wallace (Ualesi)	Not Awarded	Not Awarded
2012	Jayleen Chun	Tallahassee Mauga	Not Awarded	Not Awarded
2013	Antoneesha Misa	Jaynah Karter(Muao)	Moesha Bird	Not Awarded
2014	Arykah Fonoti	Viva La Juicy Mahe	Anse Raphael(Lafaele)	Not Awarded
2015	Chrystahl Portia Fiso	Dessy Mua'ava	Annie Olo	Alanna Fizz Gore
2016	Miah Manuleleua	Davina Wallace(Ualesi)	Christian Wright Saalea	Not Awarded
2017	Aruni Talaifaga	Valentana Faumuina	Lima Schwenke	Francine Tuutatau
2018	Ara-Lei Mahealani Yandall	Mikaela Saelua	Dezonikah Michaels	Isabella Ah-Mu Mageo
2019	CeCe Iavai	Dezonikah Michaels	Micay De La Cruz	Aruni Talaifaga
2021	Uni Daniels	Dessy Mua’ava	Ameliah Lafaele	Jaimie Laurette
2023	Vashley Mulitalo	Kandii Lei Fanolua	Karen Kalani Tu’ese Sekai	Not Awarded
