= Toʻotoʻoaliʻi Roger Stanley =

Samoan faʻafafine activist (1976–2018)

- Born: 1976
- Died: 2018 (aged 41–42); Motoʻotua, Samoa
- Citizenship: Samoa
- Known for: President of the Samoa Faʻafafine Association

Toʻotoʻoaliʻi Roger Stanley (1976–2018) was a Samoan faʻafafine activist, who was President of the Samoa Faʻafafine Association from its foundation in 2006 to her death.

== Biography ==
Soʻoalo Toʻotoʻoaliʻi Roger Stanley was born in 1976. Her parents were Niutea and Stanley of Siusega. She completed tertiary education in Fiji. She worked for the Samoan government from the late 1990s onwards, as a policy analyst and administrative officer. At the time of her death she worked for the Samoa Tourism Authority.

Stanley was a co-founder and President of the Samoa Faʻafafine Association since its establishment in 2006 until her 2018 death. It was Stanley who persuaded the President of Samoa to become the patron of the SFA. As an activist, as well as faʻafafine, Stanley campaigned for the rights of LGBTQ people in Samoa. She was a board member of the Pacific Sexual and Gender Diversity Network (PSGDN). She saw her faʻafafine identity as a cultural, rather than a sexual identity, although she saw the utility in using western LGBT terminologies in order to access opportunities and to advocate for her community. She died at the Tupua Tamases Meaole (TTM) Hospital in Motoʻotua in January 2018.

== Awards ==
- Samoa Observer - Person of the Year (2017).

== Legacy ==
Stanley's life featured in New Zealand's first play to feature a cast of all queer people of colour. Other activists who were impersonated in The Eternal Queers included Gary Wu and Stormé DeLarverie.
