= Ymania Brown =

Samoan LGBTQ rights activist and lawyer (1963–2025)

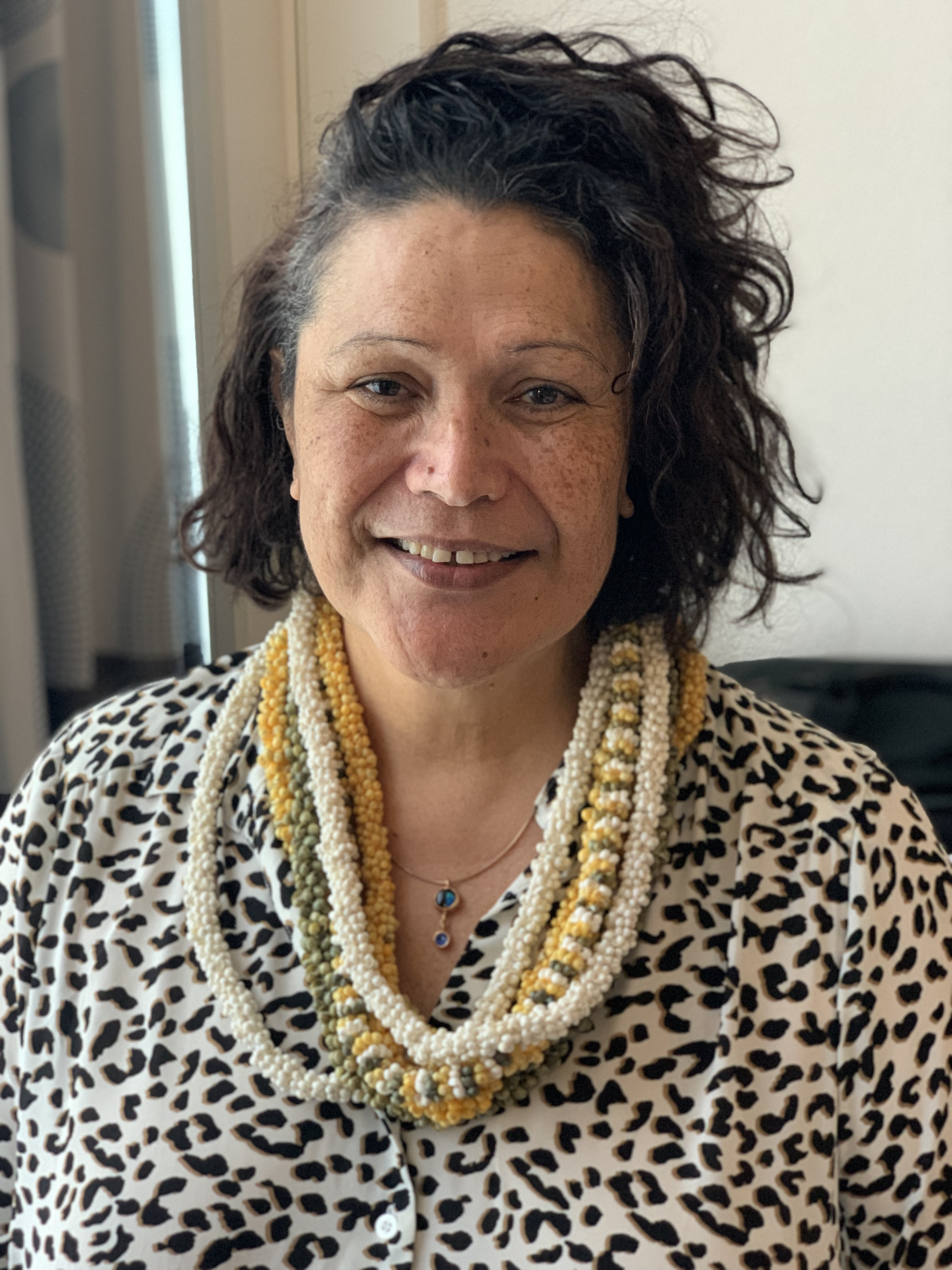
- Brown in Geneva, Switzerland, July 2022
- Born: 11 September 1963
- Died: 15 September 2025 (aged 62); Berlin, Germany
- Known for: LGBTQ rights advocacy

Lealaitagomoa Toalepaialii Tuisina Ymania Brown-Gabriel (11 September 1963 – 15 September 2025), better known as Ymania Brown, was a Samoan LGBTQ rights activist and lawyer.

Brown served as co–secretary General of ILGA World from 2019 to 2024, as co-president of Interpride, and as executive director of Transgender Europe from 2024 until her death.

== Background ==
Brown was born on 11 September 1963 and grew up in Samoa. She began identifying as a girl at age three, which her mother was supportive of, but her father was resistant to. Her mother left the family when she was nine, in response to domestic violence exacerbated by her father's alcoholism. She helped raise her younger sibling after her mother left. One of her father's cousins moved in with the family, and he sexually abused Brown for multiple years. She left Samoa to join her mother and stepfather in New Zealand.

Brown later moved to Australia, but struggled to find jobs due to discrimination based on her gender identity. She became homeless, and worked as a sex worker in Sydney. She was able to save enough money to have gender-affirming surgery in 1986.

After her surgery, Brown moved to Europe and worked as a model. A few years later, she returned to New Zealand to attend college. She held a master's degree in law. In the late 1990s she returned to Sydney, where she found a corporate job for a software company through one of her university lecturers. First working in human resources and later becoming in-house legal counsel, Brown continued to work in a corporate setting in Sydney for the next twenty years. She chose to become a full-time activist during the COVID-19 pandemic.

== Activism ==
Brown served as Executive Director of TGEU (from July 2024 until her death), as co-secretary general of ILGA World (from March 2019 until November 2024), and as Co-President of Interpride. She also worked as technical director of the Samoa Fa'afafine Association (from at least June 2013) and with Sydney World Pride through Equality Australia.

In 2014 Brown acted as the co-chair of ILGA Oceania. She later became co-chair of the Global Interfaith Network for People of All Sexes, Sexual Orientation, Gender Identity and Expression (GINSSOGIE) and the International Trans Fund. She also served on advisory boards for Astraea and WorldPride (Copenhagen 2021).

Brown was involved with campaigns to have the Samoan government recognise adoption by LGBT individuals and to repeal laws that criminalised "impersonation of a woman". Her advocacy primarily focused more on financial equality than marriage equality. She also encouraged Australia to focus on LGBT rights as part of their foreign policy.

She served as a matai across four districts in Samoa.

== Personal life and death ==
Brown identified as both a trans woman and as faʻafafine. She had two sons, whom she adopted from the sister of a previous partner living in Samoa. She was Catholic.

Brown died on 15 September 2025, aged 62, at the Charité's German Heart Center in Berlin, Germany, from medical complications following a planned heart surgery.

== Recognition and awards ==
- Shivananda Khan Award for Extraordinary Achievement, 2020 Asia Pacific HERO Awards, APCOM Foundation
