= FAFSWAG =

Arts collective in New Zealand

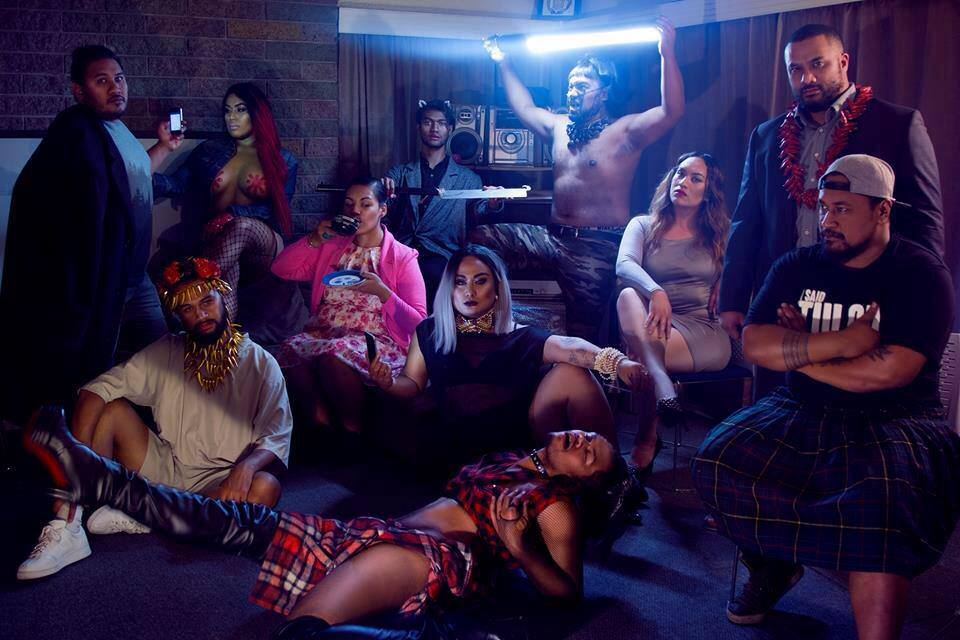
- FAFSWAG Family Portrait 2016
- Formation: 2013
- Location: Auckland, New Zealand
- Website: www.fafswagvogue.com

FAFSWAG is an arts collective of Māori and Pacific LGBTQI+ artists and activists founded in Auckland, New Zealand in 2013. They explore and celebrate the unique identity of gender fluid Pacific people and LGBTQI+ communities in multi-disciplinary art forms. In 2020 FAFSWAG was awarded an Arts Laureate from the New Zealand Arts Foundation, and they also represented New Zealand at the Biennale of Sydney.

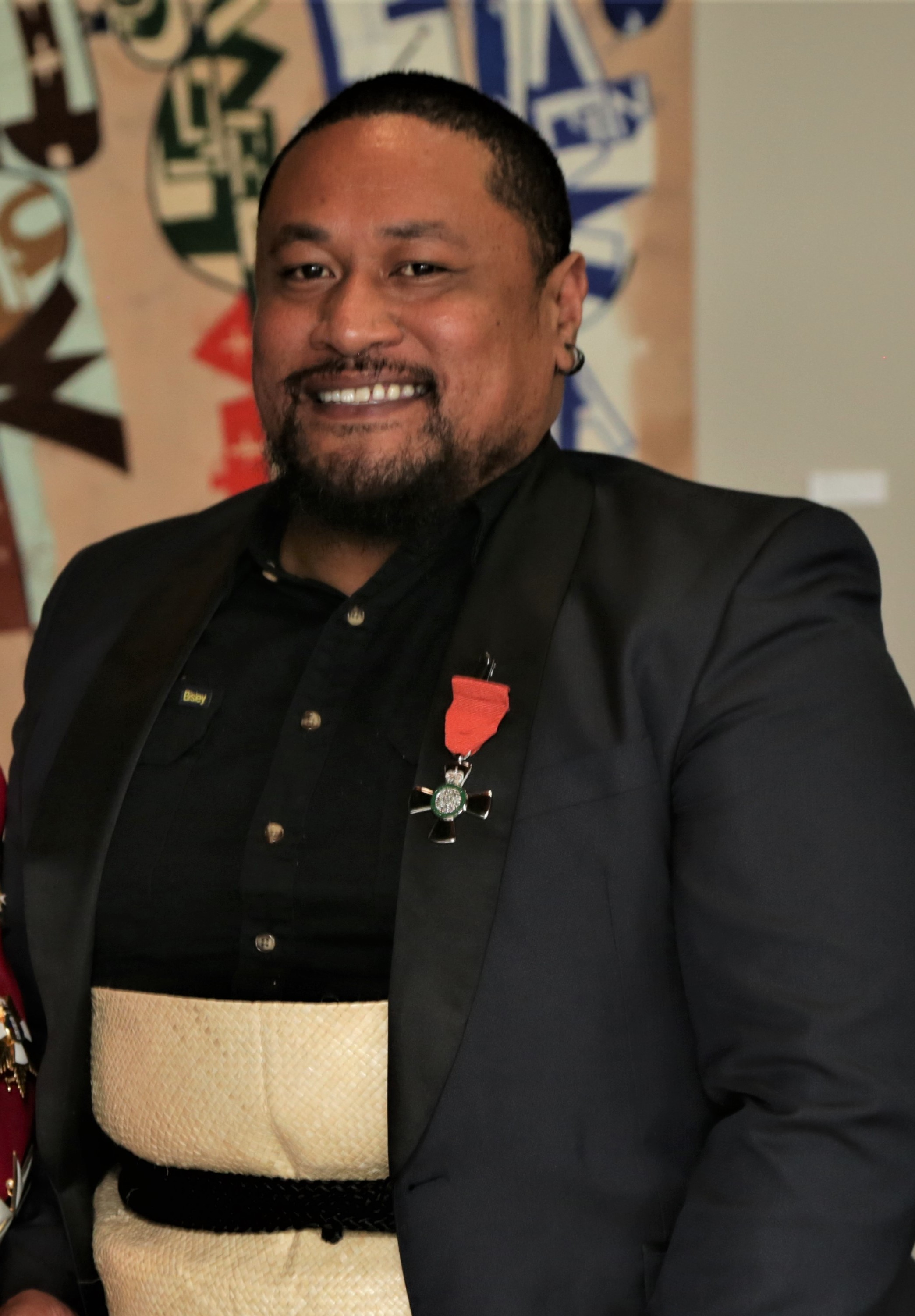
Tanu Gago in 2019 receiving his Queens Birthday Award

== Background ==
=== Early years ===
Pati Solomona Tyrell and Tanu Gago formed the FAFSWAG arts collective in 2013. The collective grew from a photography project of Gago's that was a part of university course work. FAFSWAG create art and experiences in many different art forms with a strong online focus. Their goal is to "celebrate Queer Brown bodies, contemporary Pacific arts, and cultural restoration". FAFSWAG state they are committed to social change. The art projects of the collective focus on challenging the lack of Indigenous LGBQI representation in creative industries and the fluid gender spectrum in Pacific culture. The collective's name is a portmanteau between fa'afafine and swag.

Initially there were ten artists in the collective. By 2020 FAFSWAG artists numbered 12 including: Jermaine Dean, Falencie Filipo, Tapuaki Helu, Elyssia Wilson Heti, Nahora Ioane, Hōhua Ropate Kurene, Moe Laga, Ilalio Loau, Tim Swann and James Waititi in addition to the founders Tyrell and Gago.

The first FAFSWAG Aitu Ball was held in South Auckland in 2013, however from 2016 balls have been held in central Auckland. The FAFSWAG ball promotes the 'queer brown community' and the dance form vogue that originated in New York amongst marginalised African American queer communities. The ball is an inclusive space that celebrates the cultures of Māori and Pacific and invites participation from others, "whether you're Asian or Indian or Pākehā: there’s a place for you in that space as well.”

=== Artist residencies and international productions ===
The collective was the 2017 Company in Residence at Basement Theatre, and were the winners of the 2017 Auckland Theatre Award for best overall body of work. In 2018, FAFSWAG held a ball at the Auckland Art Gallery. In 2019, founder Tanu Gago was awarded the New Zealand Order of Merit for services to art and the LGBTIQ+ community.

The artistic practice of the collective has been impacted by the COVID epidemic. In 2020 a production Fa'aafa was scheduled in Berlin at HAU Hebbel am Ufer before being cancelled due to the epidemic. The name Fa'aafa is a Samoan term recognising a third gender, and the production combined poetry from Tusiata Avia, 'adornment of voguing', movement and sound. For their Sydney Biennale project in 2020 FAFSWAG were required to re-vision their project as an online production due to COVID restrictions. The resulting project was named CODESWITCH: Relearn, Reimagine, Recreate – a FAFSWAG Manifesto for the 22nd Biennale of Sydney. The production was made up of a number of works including Protection (2020) by Nahora Ioane and Tanu Gago, created in response to the criminalisation of homosexuality in the Cook Islands; Whānau Ariki (2020) by Amy Lautogo, Ria Hiroki and Elyssia Wilson Heti, a 'game-like experience of dressing a woman' aimed at decolonizing the bodies of the artists; and M A T A L A by artists Hohua Ropate Kurene and Tapuaki Helu, a series of photographs of men and flowers with themes of manhood, identity, sexuality and intimacy.

FAFSWAG have collaborated with Liam Finn and Neil Finn on a music video, and have presented productions or exhibitions at the Auckland Art Gallery, the Auckland War Memorial Museum, Artspace Aotearoa, Māngere Arts Centre - Ngā Tohu o Uenuku, and the Centre of Contemporary Art, Christchurch.

In 2022 FAFSWAG were invited to be part of documenta fifteen in Kassel, Germany. The lack of New Zealand press coverage of this event was discussed in research influencing the development of new arts policy in New Zealand.

== Artistry ==
FAFSWAG is inspired by New York Ball culture. Founder Tanu Gago felt that queer spaces for Pasifika can act as a counter to traditional Pasifika voices in the community, which tend to be older, more conservative and more religious.

== Exhibitions & works ==
- 2013: Te Puke o Tara Community Centre, FAFSWAG's first vogue ball
- 2015: Studio One Toi Tū
- 2016: Family Bar, Karangahape Road
- 2017: FAFSWAG became the company in residence at Basement Theatre
- 2017: Artspace Aotearoa
- 2017: Making Space: FAFSWAG, COCA (Centre of Contemporary Art)
- 2018: Auckland Museum Tāmaki Paenga Hira Late at the Museum event, Explicit Inclusion Identity.
- 2018: Auckland Art Gallery Toi o Tāmaki, documentary launch
- 2018: FAFSWAG Aitu Ball Raynham Park Studio, Karangahape Road, Auckland
- 2018/19: FAFSWAGVOGUE.COM – an online interactive documentary about Auckland's dance vogue culture, directed by Tanu Gago, produced by Piki Films, and featured at the Centre Pompidou in Paris in 2018
- 2019: Where's My Room 7min music video in collaboration with Neil and Liam Finn directed by Sam Kristofski and choreographed by Pati Solomona Tyrell
- 2020: CODESWITCH: Relearn, Reimagine, Recreate – a FAFSWAG Manifesto for the 22nd Biennale of Sydney, 22nd Sydney Biennale
- 2020: Biennale of Sydney, representing New Zealand
- 2020: HAU Hebbel am Ufer, Berlin

== Awards ==
- 2017: Auckland Theatre Award for best overall body of work
- 2020: Arts Foundation Laureate 2020 – Interdisciplinary Arts
