= LGBTQ rights in Samoa =

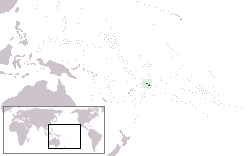
- Samoa
- Legal status: Illegal for men, legal for women
- Penalty: Up to 7 years’ imprisonment (not enforced, legalization proposed)
- Gender identity: Not known
- Military: Has no military
- Discrimination protections: Some protections concerning sexual orientation in employment only

Family rights
- Recognition of relationships: No
- Adoption: No

Lesbian, gay, bisexual, transgender and queer (LGBTQ) people in Samoa face legal challenges not faced by non-LGBTQ residents. Sexual contact between men is illegal, punishable by up to seven years’ imprisonment, but the law is not enforced.

Samoan society tends to be very tolerant of being transgender, but not of homosexuality. It has a large transgender or "third gender" community called fa'afafine. Fa'afafine are a recognised part of traditional Samoan customs, allowing for third gender people, in particular, to be accepted as they have always been a part of Samoan culture. Groups advocating for better representation of fa'afafine and the decriminalisation of homosexuality include the Samoa Fa'afafine Association, which sees anti-gay laws as hindering the full incorporation of both fa'afafine and gay and lesbian Samoans into society.

Additionally, in 2011, Samoa signed the "joint statement on ending acts of violence and related human rights violations based on sexual orientation and gender identity" at the United Nations, condemning violence and discrimination against LGBTQ people. By signing the joint statement, Samoa has made a commitment to the international community that it recognises the particular challenges faced by LGBTI people when examined through a human rights lens, and undertaken that it will endeavour to end violence, criminal sanctions and related human-rights violations based on sexual orientation and gender identity.

== History ==
Prejudices towards homosexuality are not documented before the arrival of Christian missionaries in the late 18th and early 19th century. Samoan pre-colonial society, similar to other Polynesian societies, was a very "sexually free" culture. Same-sex marriage ceremonies are known to have occurred. Fa'afafine, a cultural third gender in Samoa, could traditionally marry either men or women, and even father children. This is not so much the case in contemporary times, with reportedly very few fa'afafine opting to marry.

However, in 2026, Samoa held their first LGBTQ Pride Week, with LGBTQ residents and allies gathering to celebrate the community.

== Legality of same-sex sexual activity ==
Sections 67, 68, and 71 of the Crimes Act 2013 (Samoan: Tulafono o Solitulafono 2013) criminalize same-sex sexual acts. The Act took effect on 1 May 2013. The law also prohibits heterosexual anal intercourse and oral sex.

Section 67. Sodomy

1. A person who commits sodomy is liable:
  1. in any other case, to imprisonment for a term not exceeding five (5) years.
2. Sodomy is complete upon penetration.
3. It is no defense to a charge under this section that the other party consented.

Section 68. Attempts to commit sodomy A person is liable to imprisonment for a term not exceeding five (5) years who:

1. attempts to commit sodomy; or
2. assaults any person with intent to commit sodomy.

Section 71. Keeping place of resort for homosexual acts

A person is liable to imprisonment for a term not exceeding seven (7) years who:

1. keeps or manages, or knowingly acts or assists in the management of, any premises used as a place of resort for the commission of indecent acts between males; or
2. being the tenant, lessee or occupier of any premises, knowingly permits the premises or any part thereof to be used as a place of resort for the commission of indecent acts between males; or
3. being the lessor or landlord of any premises, or the agent of the lessor or landlord, lets the premises or any part of the premises with the knowledge that the premises are to be used as a place of resort for the commission of indecent acts between males, or that some part of the premises is to be so used, or is wilfully a party to the continued use of the premises or any part thereof as a place of resort for the commission of the indecent acts.

"Sodomy" was defined in the 2007 case of Police v Poi as meaning penetration of the male or female victim's anus by the offender's penis.

In June 2010, the Samoa Law Reform Commission, in its report to the Prime Minister, recommended "repealing all criminal penalties attached to the criminal offence of sodomy and related acts conducted in private between consenting adult males." The Commission noted that legalisation received support in the majority of public submissions.

Sections 58D, 58E, 58G, and 58J of the Crimes Ordinance 1961 (now repealed) criminalised same-sex sexual acts. In 2011, it was reported that Samoa would decriminalise same-sex sexual acts between consenting adults under a new Criminal Code recommended by the Samoa Law Reform Commission. The Government, however, rejected the commission's recommendation.

== Recognition of same-sex relationships ==
In August 2012, Prime Minister Tuilaepa Sailele Malielegaoi reportedly "scoffed" at the idea that Samoa would follow the lead of New Zealand in legalising same-sex marriage. When asked if he would support legalisation, he said, "You are dreaming." He reiterated this position, on explicitly religious grounds, in March 2013, saying:

My view as the leader of Samoa on this gay marriage issue is simple: There is no way, none whatsoever, that this issue will ever be considered in Samoa. The Samoan parliament would never consider a bill such as this, at least not in my time. It is the strong and combined view of the government of Samoa and the country's religious denominations. We stand united against this because Samoa is founded on Christian beliefs. And Christian beliefs are against this type of behavior which the Bible states, was the reason for the curse that brought destruction on Gomorrah and Sodom. It is very clear that the sacrament of marriage is between a man and a woman. Same-sex marriage is a sin. And no matter how people present this issue, no matter how they wrap it up, there is only one truth, and that is, this type of behavior is a sin.

In October 2013, the Prime Minister personally criticised the marriage of a gay Samoan man in New Zealand.

In September 2017, Prime Minister Tuilaepa Sailele Malielegaoi ruled out the legalisation of abortion and same-sex marriage in Samoa as long as he and his Human Rights Protection Party remain in power, stating that they would not allow "heathenistic practices" in Samoa and that "it will never be accepted by government because it undermines our tradition and our culture."

In November 2017, a Samoan associate minister accused the United Nations of secretly promoting same-sex marriage in Samoa. Additionally, he affirmed that Samoa would "never" legalise same-sex marriage.

In December 2017, Prime Minister Tuilaepa Sailele Malielegaoi described same-sex marriage as an "abomination" and a "Sodom and Gomorrah practice" and that "there is no true Christian country in the world which would allow it and it would not be allowed in Samoa as long as it remained a Christian country". The Samoa Fa'afafine Association opposed same-sex marriage in 2013, and said in 2017 that it is not a priority as much as "the promotion of human rights and the reduction of discrimination and violence based on gender identity" is concerned. In 2018, the association said that "marriage is the least of our worries when you don't have a job, it's not a priority."

== Discrimination protections ==
Samoa has limited protections for sexual orientation. Section 20(2) of the Labour and Employment Relations Act 2013 (Samoan: Tulafono o Sootaga Va Lelei o Leipa ma Galuega 2013) prohibits direct and indirect discrimination on the basis of sexual orientation against an employee or applicant for employment in any employment policies, procedure or practices. Article 20 of the law states as follows:

A person must not discriminate, directly or indirectly, against an employee or an applicant for employment in any employment policies, procedures or practices on one or more arbitrary grounds, including ethnicity, race, colour, sex, gender, religion, political opinion, national extraction, sexual orientation, social origin, marital status, pregnancy, family responsibilities, real or perceived HIV status or disability.

Crimes motivated by sexual orientation or gender identity are criminalised under Section 7(1)(h) of the Sentencing Act 2016 (Samoan: Tulafono o Faasalaga 2016).

== Gender identity and expression ==
Samoa is fairly progressive in terms of gender identity and expression as it has a large transgender or "third gender" community called the fa'afafine. Fa'afafine are a recognised part of traditional Samoan customs, allowing for transgender people in particular trans women to be accepted as they have always been a part of Samoan culture. On 1 May 2013, Samoa repealed criminal provisions prohibiting males "impersonating" females. The Crimes Act 2013 removed provisions contained in the previous Crimes Ordinance 1961 which criminalised males "impersonating" females in a public place, and which was used to target transgender women and gender-diverse people.

=== Faʻafafine and faʻafatama ===
Faʻafafine are people who identify themselves as a third gender in Samoa, American Samoa and the Samoan diaspora. A recognised gender identity/gender role since at least the early 20th century in Samoan society, and some theorise an integral part of traditional Samoan culture, faʻafafine are assigned male at birth, and explicitly embody both gender traits, ranging from extravagantly feminine to conventionally masculine. The Ombudsman's first National State of Human Rights Report, released in August 2015, referred to faʻafafine as "the third gender that has always existed in Samoa" and noted "their hard work and dedication to the family in carrying out both roles and responsibilities for men and women". Likewise, faʻafatama are people who were assigned female at birth, but embody both gender traits.

The Samoa Fa'afafine Association (S.F.A.) is an organisation designed to foster collaboration between the faʻafafine and the LGBTQ communities in Samoa, the Asia Pacific region and the world. S.F.A describes itself as an organisation dedicated to balancing both Samoan values with Western influences and aims to promote a positive attitude toward the Samoan faʻafafine community.

== Conversion therapy ==
Conversion therapy has a negative effect on the lives of LGBTQ people, and can lead to low self-esteem, depression and suicide ideation.

The Mental Health Act 2007 (Samoan: Tulafono o le Tulaga Maloloina o le Mafaufau 2007) states that people are not to be considered mentally ill if they refuse or fail to express a particular sexual orientation, and prohibits any conversion therapy by health professionals in the field of mental health. The act was published on 2 February 2007.

== Criticism of Samoa's LGBT rights status ==
The status of LGBTQ rights in Samoa have been examined by the Universal Periodic Review (UPR) Working Group through a mechanism of the United Nations (UN) Human Rights Council (HRC). Samoa is currently due for its third cycle review in April and May 2021.

=== First UPR cycle recommendations ===
Country	Level of Action	Recommendation
Canada	5, Specific action	Fulfil its commitment to equality and non-discrimination by repealing all legal provisions that criminalise sexual activity between consenting adults and investigate all cases of discrimination based on sexual orientation and gender identity
France	5, Specific action	Repeal laws criminalising relations between consenting adults of the same sex
Norway	5, Specific action	Repeal all provisions which may be applied to criminalise sexual activity between consenting adults and adopt appropriate legislative measures to include sexual orientation and gender identity in equality and non-discrimination laws
United States	2, Continuing action	Continue its reconsideration of laws that restrict the human rights of individuals based on sexual orientation or gender identity, and repeal all such laws

In the first cycle of the Universal Periodic Review, Samoa rejected three level 5 recommendations by Canada, France and Norway to act immediately to repeal all legal provisions criminalising sexual activity between consenting adults, and investigate discrimination based on sexual orientation and gender identity in order to fulfill its commitment to equality and non-discrimination. However, rejections these recommendations, it did accept a recommendation by the United States to continue its reconsideration of decriminalising same-sex sexual activity, with the UPR going on to state:

Samoa noted the gaps and weaknesses in its legislative framework on upholding equality and non-discrimination based on sexual orientation, and that relevant legislation was being reviewed by the Samoa Law Reform Commission. Samoa indicated that Fa'afafine, gays and lesbians were integral members of Samoan society and were heirs to family chiefly titles and lands through extended family consensus, as done for all men and women of its society. However, sexual orientation was a sensitive issue in Samoa given the religious and cultural beliefs of mainstream society. Nonetheless, Samoa was confident that education, awareness and sensitisation would pave the way for societal acceptance and prevention of discrimination that might arise out of sexual orientation.

=== Second UPR cycle recommendations ===
Country	Level of Action	Recommendation
New Zealand	4, General action	Take steps to address inequalities affecting human rights in the area of discrimination based on sexual orientation and gender identity
Slovenia	5, Specific action	Repeal all provisions criminalising same-sex relations between consenting adults
Spain	5, Specific action	Complete the updating of legislation by decriminalising homosexual relations between consenting adults
United States	5, Specific action	Combat discrimination based on sexual orientation and gender identity by decriminalising "sodomy" and "indecency between males", which currently constitute crimes punishable by prison sentencing for up to seven years
Canada	5, Specific action	Repeal laws that criminalise consensual same-sex conduct, and prohibit discrimination on the grounds of sexual orientation or gender identity in all areas of public life, including employment, health and education, bringing the legislation of Samoa into conformity with its commitment to equality
Chile	4, General action	Adopt measures to prevent violence and discrimination against persons on the basis of their sexual orientation and gender identity
Slovenia	4, General action	Adopt measures to reduce violence against women and girls and violence based on sexual orientation and gender identity

The recommendations of the second cycle report reflect increased concerns surrounding the lack of LGBTQ rights for Samoan individuals, as nearly twice as many countries put forward actions for Samoa to consider, with countries such as New Zealand commending Samoa on its progress in increasing participation by women in Parliament and government leadership positions but noting that further work was required in the area of lesbian, gay, bisexual and transgender rights. In response, Samoa only accepted Slovenia's recommendation to reduce violence against females and individuals on the basis their sexual orientation and gender identity, taking note of the other proposals but ultimately rejecting them:

The Constitution of Samoa declares the protection of fundamental rights and individual freedoms, regardless of gender. Decriminalising sexual activity of sodomy and the repeal of all provisions criminalizing homosexual relations are not possible at this time because of cultural sensitivities and Christian beliefs of the Samoan society. The acceptance of this recommendation will go against the spirit of our Constitution which is founded on Christian principles. Consequently, Samoa notes these recommendations.

== National Human Rights Institution ==
The National Human Rights Institution (NHRI) of Samoa was officially launched on International Human Rights Day, 10 September 2013, after the Samoan Parliament passed the Ombudsman (Komesina O Sulufaiga) Act 2013. The NHRI operates out of the Office of the Ombudsman and helps monitor, advise and report human rights issues, as well as raise awareness of individual rights and responsibilities amongst the population to promote good governance and prevent human right violations in Samoa.

The establishment of the NHRI was met with worldwide approval as the Pacific Islands Forum Secretariat applauded the Government of Samoa for promoting public awareness of human rights and efforts to combat all forms of discrimination through proper reporting of alleged violations and better education. The UN commended Samoa's achievement as a milestone not only for the county but for the region as a whole as the creation of a national human rights institute marks Samoa's accession to the rank of countries which regard the enjoyment of people's human rights and freedoms among their most essential priorities, launching a precedent that can be looked up to by all of Oceania.

Samoa's first human rights overview, "For Samoa by Samoa", makes no mention or reference to sexual orientation and gender identity, including the fa'afafine population, even though there is an LGBTQ presence on the NHRI's Advisory Council. Recently, there have been a number of NGO submissions concentrated on decriminalisation, LGBTQ youth issues and partnership rights for LGBTQ people in Samoa, with current advocates focused on increasing institutional and public comprehension of what non-discrimination based on sexual orientation and gender expression would look like.

== Living conditions ==
=== LGBTQ-themed movie bans ===
In 2009, the Samoa's Censorship Board banned the screening of the movie Milk about the life of American gay rights activist Harvey Milk, yet in the same week it allowed the screening of the movie Lesbian Vampire Killers. In 2019, it banned the screening of the movie Rocketman about the life of British gay musician Elton John. The move was criticised by human rights activists as "hypocritical", "ignorant" and" "selective morality", and was protested by the Samoa Fa'afafine Association.

== Summary table ==
Same-sex sexual activity legal	No (For males, legalisation proposed)/ Yes (For females)
Equal age of consent	No (For males, legalisation proposed)/ Yes (For females)
Anti-discrimination laws in employment only	Yes (Since 2013)
Anti-discrimination laws in the provision of goods and services	No
Anti-discrimination laws in all other areas (Incl. indirect discrimination, hate speech)	No
Hate crime laws include sexual orientation and gender identity	Yes (Since 2016)
Same-sex marriages	No
Recognition of same-sex couples	No
Stepchild adoption by same-sex couples	No
Joint adoption by same-sex couples	No
LGBTQ people allowed to serve openly in the military	Has no military
Right to change legal gender	(Samoa has a large transgender community called the fa'afafine and the fa'afatama; but unclear if legal gender changes are allowed)
Conversion therapy banned	Yes (Indirect ban since 2007, only medical professionals are barred from practicing attempted treatment)
Access to IVF for lesbians	No
Commercial surrogacy for gay male couples	No
MSMs allowed to donate blood	

== See also ==
- Human rights in Samoa
- LGBTQ rights in Oceania
- David Huebner, who served as the US ambassador to Samoa from 2009 until 2014, is an openly gay man
