= Tanu Gago =

Samoan artist and filmmaker

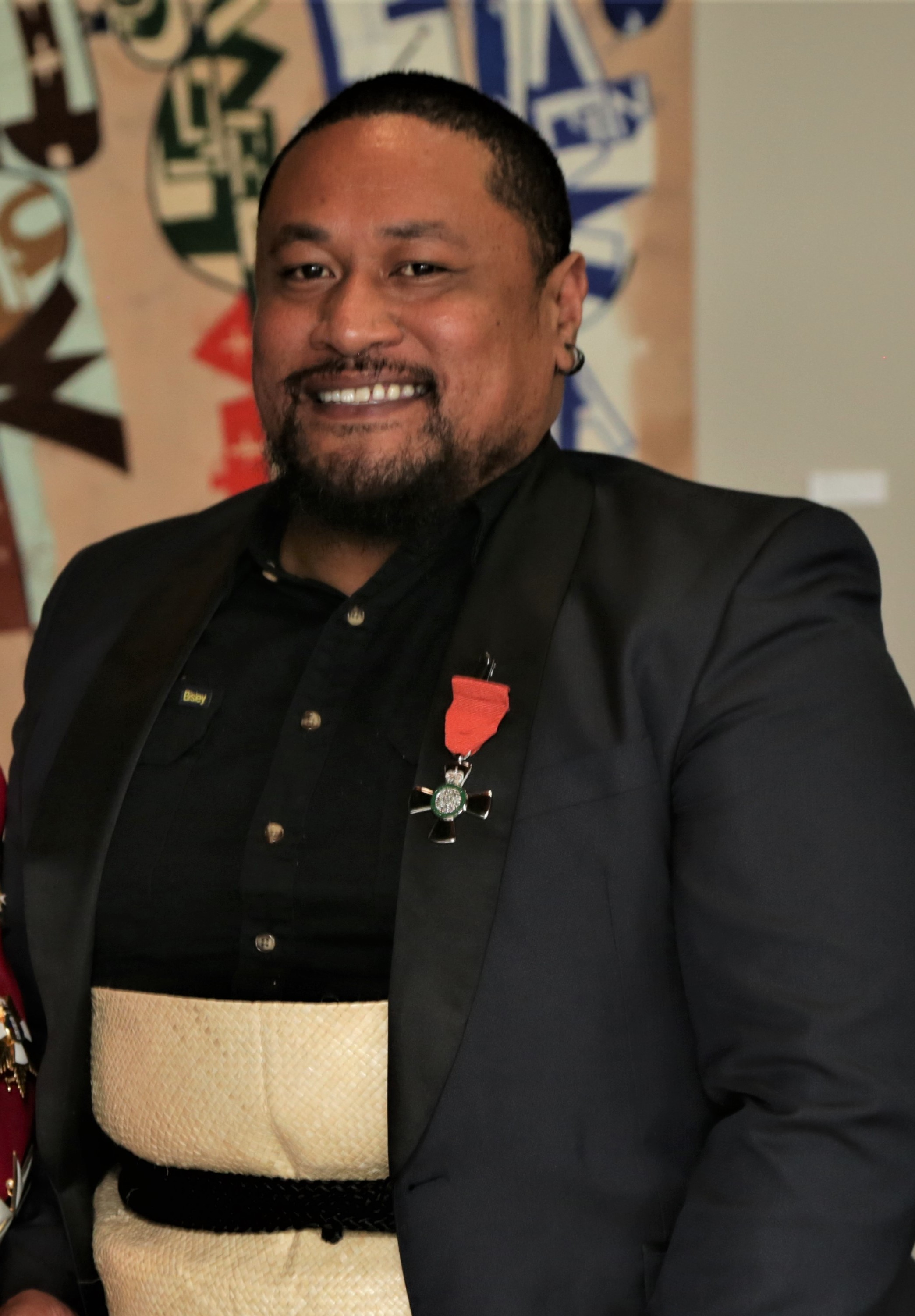
- Gago in 2019
- Born: 1983 (age 42–43); Samoa
- Known for: Interdisciplinary art; queer activism; filmmaking Co-founder of artist collective FAFSWAG

Tanu Gago MNZM is a Samoan interdisciplinary artist, filmmaker, and curator based in Auckland, New Zealand. He is also co-founder of arts collective FAFSWAG. He is best known for his work that explores intersections of Pacific queer and gender identities, as well as themes of cultural heritage and colonization. Gago's work has been shown in various exhibitions and festivals both nationally and internationally, including the Auckland Arts Festival, the Museum of Contemporary Art in Sydney, and the Venice Biennale. Throughout his career, Gago has received numerous awards and grants, including the Creative New Zealand Arts Pasifika Award in 2017 and the Arts Foundation Laureate Award in 2020. He received a New Zealand Queens Birthday honour in 2019 for services to art and the LGBTIQ+ community.

== Biography ==
Gago was born in 1983 in Samoa, migrated to New Zealand in 1984 and grew up in Manukau City, Auckland, New Zealand. He spent most of his childhood on the beach, riding his bicycle through the village, and making tapa cloth with his aunt. He attended different schools, including Saint Joseph's Boys in Apia, Samoa, De La Salle College in South Auckland, Apifo'ou in Tongatapu, and Māngere College in New Zealand. He has a Bachelor of Arts in performing arts with a major in writing and directing for screen from Unitec Institute of Technology, Auckland.

Gago's artistic journey began after graduating from film school at United in 2010, when his friend and independent Pacific curator, Ema Tavola, curated his first solo exhibition entitled YOU LOVE MY FRESH (YLMF) at Te Tuhi Centre for the Arts, as part of Manukau Festival of Arts. The exhibition was a synchronised, panoramic, three-channel video installation that explored masculinity from Gago's own cultural experience, sometimes built upon the individual experiences of other Pacific men he photographed or featured in his films.

A photographic exhibition of Gago's called Avanoa o Tama (2012) had as the subject Polynesian men and explored notions of gender and sexuality. This exhibition was presented at Centre of Contemporary Art Toi Moroki (CoCA). He utilizes Moving Image, Photography, and documentary as ideological agents of power and control.

FAFSWAG is a collective that pioneer Ballroom culture in New Zealand, and exhibit around the world including Centre Pompidou in Paris, France, Rotterdam International Film Festival and ImagineNATIVE, Toronto, Canada. FAFSWAG represented New Zealand at the 22nd Biennale of Sydney. FAFSWAG began in 2013, by Tanu Gago and Pati Solomona Tyrell. Following Tanu's successful solo exhibition Avanoa O Tama, which brought together individuals from South Auckland to participate in staged images that Tanu directed and produced. The collective has since become a key figure in the growing Ballroom Aotearoa community. Tanu is the director of FAFSWAGVogue.com, an interactive documentary about ball culture in Auckland. He has several screenplays in development and received funding for a short film Picking Crew. In 2022, Gago and Jermaine Dean launched their sculptural AR project entitled ATUA at the Sundance International Film Festival, along with FAFSWAG represented Aotearoa at Documenta Fifteen with Apparatus (2018).

In 2019, Gago presented an exhibition titled "Savage In the Garden" at The Physics Room in Christchurch, featuring a series of images and audio recordings that explore queerness as a site for exploration and open social discussion. The exhibition was developed during Gago's time as the Pacific Artist in residence at the Macmillan Brown Centre for Pacific Studies at the University of Canterbury. Gago's work challenges how Pacific women are represented in the media and advertising images, aiming to move away from cultural stereotypes. He hopes that his work will create a point of reference for future generations and reflection of the politics of identity, body and gender, all through disruption. He works at the intersections of film, Queer activism, moving image, animation, and AR interactivity, with a focus on building restorative narratives and creating a place of standing for Queer Indigenous Moana artists and audiences.

In 2014, Gago received the Auckland Festival of Photography Annual Commission.

His artistic practice is:

the intersections of film, digital arts, animation, and interactive technologies, with an interest in building restorative narratives of queer Indigenous Moana experiences. (McCahon House Trust)

In 2018 Gago was the artist in residence at the Macmillan Brown Centre for Pacific Studies at the University of Canterbury.

In 2019 he was the Pacific community engagement coordinator for the New Zealand AIDS Foundation where he established the Love Life Fono Charitable Trust Board to support the Pacific LGBTIQ+ community.

Over May to August in 2022 Gago was the artist-in-resident at McCahon House.

Auckland Art Gallery hold art of Gago's in their collection, and he has been part of the Auckland Council's Pacific Arts and Culture Programme Board.

== Awards ==
In 2019, Gago was awarded a member of the New Zealand Order of Merit for services to art and the LGBTIQ+ community.

In 2020, he received the Contemporary Pacific Artist award at the Creative New Zealand Arts Pasifika Awards.
