= Marion Malena =

American Samoan beauty pageant contestant

Marion Mageo
- Occupation: Model

Marion Mageo, better known by the stage name Marion Malena, is a multiple beauty pageant winner who identifies as a Fa'afafine.

Malena is an American Samoan who resides in Seattle, Washington. Malena was a Miss Island Queen Pageant titleholder in 2005 and a Miss American Sevens titleholder in 2007. Malena won several multi-ethnic transgender pageants such as Miss Gay Asian Pacific Islander International, Miss UTOPIA International, and Miss Northwest.
