= Pati Solomona Tyrell =

New Zealand artist

Pati Tyrell
- Born: 11 August 1992 (age 33); Hamilton, New Zealand
- Style: Interdisciplinary Artist/ Performance, lens based mediums
- Awards: 2020 Creative NZ Pasifika Arts 'Emerging Pacific Artist Award'

Pati Solomona Tyrell (born 11 August 1992) is an interdisciplinary artist from New Zealand who focuses on performance, videography and photography. Tyrell is a founding member of art collective FAFSWAG. In 2018 Tyrell became the youngest nominee for the Walters Prize, New Zealand's most prestigious contemporary art award, for the video work Fāgogo, subsequently purchased by Auckland Art Gallery. In 2020 Tyrell won the Arts Pasifika Awards' Emerging Pacific Artist Award.

== Biography ==
Tyrell was born in Hamilton of Samoan descent. His father is Apulu Solomona Tyrell from the village of Faleasiu, Samoa and his mother is Aoatea Tyrell from the village of Fagali'i, Samoa.

Tyrell attended Fairfield Primary School, Fairfield Intermediate and Hamilton Boys' High School, graduating in 2010. He relocated to Auckland to study a Bachelor of Creative Arts programme at the Manukau Institute of Technology, based in Otara, graduating in 2017.

Tyrell is co-founder of the art collective FAFSWAG, and one of the principal photographers. FAFSWAG is the first brown queer arts collective who have been significant in New Zealand. It was established in 2013. FAFSWAG is formed of nine Pacific and Māori artists: Jermaine Dean, Falencie Filipo, Tanu Gago, Tapuaki Helu, Elyssia Wilson Heti, Nahora Ioane, Moe Laga-Toleafoa, Tim Swann, Tyrell and James Waititi. They are known socially for Auckland's underground vogue ball scene and for collective interdisciplinary works based on transforming the visual representation of the Pacific queer brown bodied chronology within Aotearoa, New Zealand. In 2022, FAFSWAG participated in Documenta fifteen with site-specific works.

In 2018 Tyrell was nominated for the Walters Prize for Fāgogo, a video work subsequently purchased by Auckland Art Gallery.

Tyrell has a strong focus on performance and lens based mediums. He creates content that draws from personal experiences growing up in the Pacific brown bodied and queer diaspora within New Zealand in hopes to bring awareness for Pasifika queerness in New Zealand.

Tyrell utilises lens-based media to create visually engaging artworks that explore ideas of urban Pacific queer identity through interdisciplinary visual art, in hope to give a voice and something for the younger queer Pasifika communities to visualise and see.

=== Fāgogo ===
Fāgogo is the name of moving image film that was nominated for the 2020 New Zealand Walters prize. Fāgogo was made in 2016, and is 9.04 minutes duration with song by Hala Kuo Papa called Over Trodden Path.

Poetry composed by Her Majesty Queen Salote Tupou III. Fāgogo refers to the Fa'a Samoa word for spoken fables in a shared context. In Samoa fāgogo was remembered as the story telling after a hard day work. Told by the older women and men there was an aspect of performance, spoken words and words that came with melodies. The receiver of a fāgogo displays the beauty of these fables then being passed down appropriating its meaning and making it their own.

In the film, Tyrell's research, writing, choreography, fashion design and styling comes together by allowing artists to respond to their own cultural heritage and by co-producing this project, Fāgogo honours traditions by 'unpacking the colonial gaze placed on queer brown bodies' and returning gender and sexual diversity to the world. Fāgogo is positioned as a restorative art practice that Pati Solomona Tyrell shares with other artists.

== Exhibitions ==
- 2014: Masculine Me Tender, Auckland Art Gallery Toi o Tāmaki
- 2016: Talk That Talk, Fresh Gallery Ōtara Artists: Mahia Jermaine Dean, Sione Monū, Sam Ioane Samau, Jonathan Selu, Darren Tainue and Pati Solomona Tyrell
- 2016: Fāgogo, Auckland Art Gallery Toi o Tāmaki Artists: Pati Tyrell
- 2017: Fāgogo, St Paul St Gallery Three. Auckland University of Technology
- 2017: Lovers Rock, PIMPI KNOWS.COM
- 2018: Fāgogo, Blue Oyster Art Project Space
- 2018: Fāgogo, Walters Prize Exhibition Auckland Art Gallery
- 2020: Oracles, City Gallery Wellington

== Awards ==
- 2018: Best in Fringe & Best visual or performance art
- 2018: Nominee for the Walters Prize.
- 2020: Awarded the Arts Pasifika Awards 'Emerging Pacific Artist Award'
- 2020: Awarded for interdisciplinary arts through the Arts Foundation Laureate As part of the queer Pasifika arts collective FAFSWAG. Tyrell received a 2020 Arts Foundation Laureate and exhibits his work at the Museum of Contemporary Arts Australia, Pingyao International Photography Festival, and the Centre Pompidou in Paris.
