= Prenatal testosterone transfer =

Hormone transfer in the womb

Prenatal Testosterone Transfer (also known as prenatal androgen transfer or prenatal hormone transfer) refers to the phenomenon in which testosterone synthesized by a developing male fetus transfers to one or more developing fetuses within the womb and influences development. This typically results in the partial masculinization of specific aspects of female behavior, cognition, and morphology, though some studies have found that testosterone transfer can cause an exaggerated masculinization in males. There is strong evidence supporting the occurrence of prenatal testosterone transfer in rodents and other litter-bearing species, such as pigs. When it comes to humans, studies comparing dizygotic opposite-sex and same-sex twins suggest the phenomenon may occur, though the results of these studies are often inconsistent.

== Mechanisms of transfer ==
Testosterone is a steroid hormone; therefore it has the ability to diffuse through the amniotic fluid between fetuses. In addition, hormones can transfer among fetuses through the mother's bloodstream.

== Consequences of testosterone transfer ==
During prenatal development, testosterone exposure is directly responsible for masculinizing the genitals and brain structures. This exposure leads to an increase in male-typical behavior.

== Animal studies ==
Most animal studies are performed on rats or mice. In these studies, the amount of testosterone each individual fetus is exposed to depends on its intrauterine position (IUP). Each gestating fetus not at either end of the uterine horn is surrounded by either two males (2M), two females (0M), or one female and one male (1M). Development of the fetus varies widely according to its IUP.

=== Mice ===
In mice, prenatal testosterone transfer causes higher blood concentrations of testosterone in 2M females when compared to 1M or 0M females. This has a variety of consequences on later female behavior, physiology, and morphology.

Below is a table comparing physiological, morphological, and behavioral differences of 0M and 2M female mice.

	0M Female Mice	2M Female Mice
Physiology	Lower fetal testosterone levels	Higher fetal testosterone levels
	Earlier vaginal opening	Later vaginal opening
	Less male offspring	More male offspring
	Mate and impregnated earlier	Mate and impregnated later
	Less sensitive to testosterone	More sensitive to testosterone
Morphology	Shorter anogenital distance	Longer anogenital distance
Behavior	Less likely to mount other females	More likely to mount other females
	Less aggressive	More aggressive

== Human studies ==
Studies involving humans often compare opposite-sex to same-sex dizygotic twins. Females of opposite-sex twin pairs are thought to have partially masculinized traits as a result of gestating along with a male. These studies test for a range of masculinized cognitive, morphological, physiological, and behavioral traits. Studies testing for differences in behavior (i.e. temperament) tend to yield inconsistent results, while those testing perception and cognition are typically more consistent. Though supporting evidence exists, whether or not prenatal testosterone transfer occurs in humans remains debatable.

Listed below are different types of opposite-sex versus same-sex twin tests used to determine whether prenatal testosterone transfer occurs in humans.

=== Tests of Behavior ===
- Sensation seeking
- Temperament
- Aggression
- Toy preference

=== Tests of Perception and Cognition ===
- Auditory system functioning: assessing otoacoustic emissions
- Expressive vocabulary
- Visio-spatial cognition: assessing mental rotation ability

=== Tests of Physiology and Morphology ===
- 2nd to 4th digit ratio
- Tooth size
- Handedness
- Lateralization of language function: assessment on a dichotic listening test
