= Mageo =

Mageo (until May 1998, MaMedia) was the oldest Czech message board, active from the end of 1995 until 2017. Milan Votava is considered the founder and spiritual father of the project, along with co-founder Aleš Němeček. In June 1997, the address mamedia.cz was recognized as the most visited Czech server with more than 2.5 million accesses per month. At the end of September, 2017, the operation of the discussion server was terminated and the domain was redirected to the project of a new social network with integrated game environment.

== History ==
Mageo's predecessor, the MaMedia discussion, was founded in August 1995 by Milan Votava and Aleš Němeček, who established the legal entities MA Media s.r.o. and MAMEDIA.COM s.r.o. (the initial letters MA were an abbreviation of the names Milan and Aleš). At first, it seemed that the project would not have a long duration due to financial problems, however, with the help of Pavel Vojíř (then a Reflex reporter, Playboy editor, editor-in-chief of Melodie and editor-in-chief of Public Reality), MaMedia was able to survive and stay viable.

Due to the impossibility of registering the domain www.mamedia.com, MaMedia was renamed to Mageo in May 1998, and there were also fundamental changes in the structure and graphics that lasted to its end. The genealogical portal genea.cz is based on the original Mageo auditorium from 1998.

The popularity of the MaMedia server increased rapidly, as evidenced by regular user events (MaMedia / Mageo steamer, an event held regularly every year, moderated several times in the past by Leoš Mareš), as well as a hacker attack on February 15, 1997. Local phenomena (Drasťák - a novel to be continued, the so-called MUSIL mania) grew into a reality at the turn of the millennium and into reality (sabotage of the Miss Internet competition, Štěpán Turek as a stellar infantry general in the 2nd year of Česko hledá SuperStar). Many people who have made a significant contribution to the Czech Internet have passed through MaMedia or Mageo (eg František Fuka, Tomáš Baldýnský, Lukáš Vychopeň or Ivo Lukačovič, etc.). With the gradual emergence of other Internet discussion forums, such as Průvodce (1998), Cyberspace (1999), Okoun (2001), Nyx (2001), Hofyland (2001), Lopuch (2001), which, like Mageo, provided the opportunity to establish discussion forums for the widest range of topics, the number of regular users of Mageo thinned.

After the internet space became more accessible to lay people, and basically anyone could create their own website, start their own blog, or thematic internet forum, and with the advent of the largest social network Facebook, by the beginning of 2011, there were very few new Mageo users and no further expansion was in sight.

Finally, on October 2, 2017, the operation of the Mageo server in the old format was terminated and redirected to a social network format, and most users migrated to the Okoun.cz discussion server.

== Literature ==
- Lády, Tomáš (2007). "Mageo". České diskusní servery [Czech discussion servers] (Thesis) (in Czech). Brno: Masaryk University : Filozofická fakulta : Kabinet informačních studií a knihovnictví. pp. 26–29.
