= Tautua =

Word in Samoan that expresses the cultural tradition of service to the family

Tautua is a word in Samoan that expresses the cultural tradition of service to the family or aiga and specifically to the ali'i or titles of the family; it can also mean any service of an individual to a greater cause. Tautua is reflected in the Samoan proverb—o le ala i le pule o le tautua—the road to leadership is through service. Tautua can mean monetary and material contributions to fa'alavelave, which mean important extended family events such as weddings or funerals, but more often it means labor, such as cleaning and preparing family functions, cooking, taking care of the elderly and children of the extended family, farming in family plantations, etc.
