= Fāgogo =

Type of storytelling in Samoa

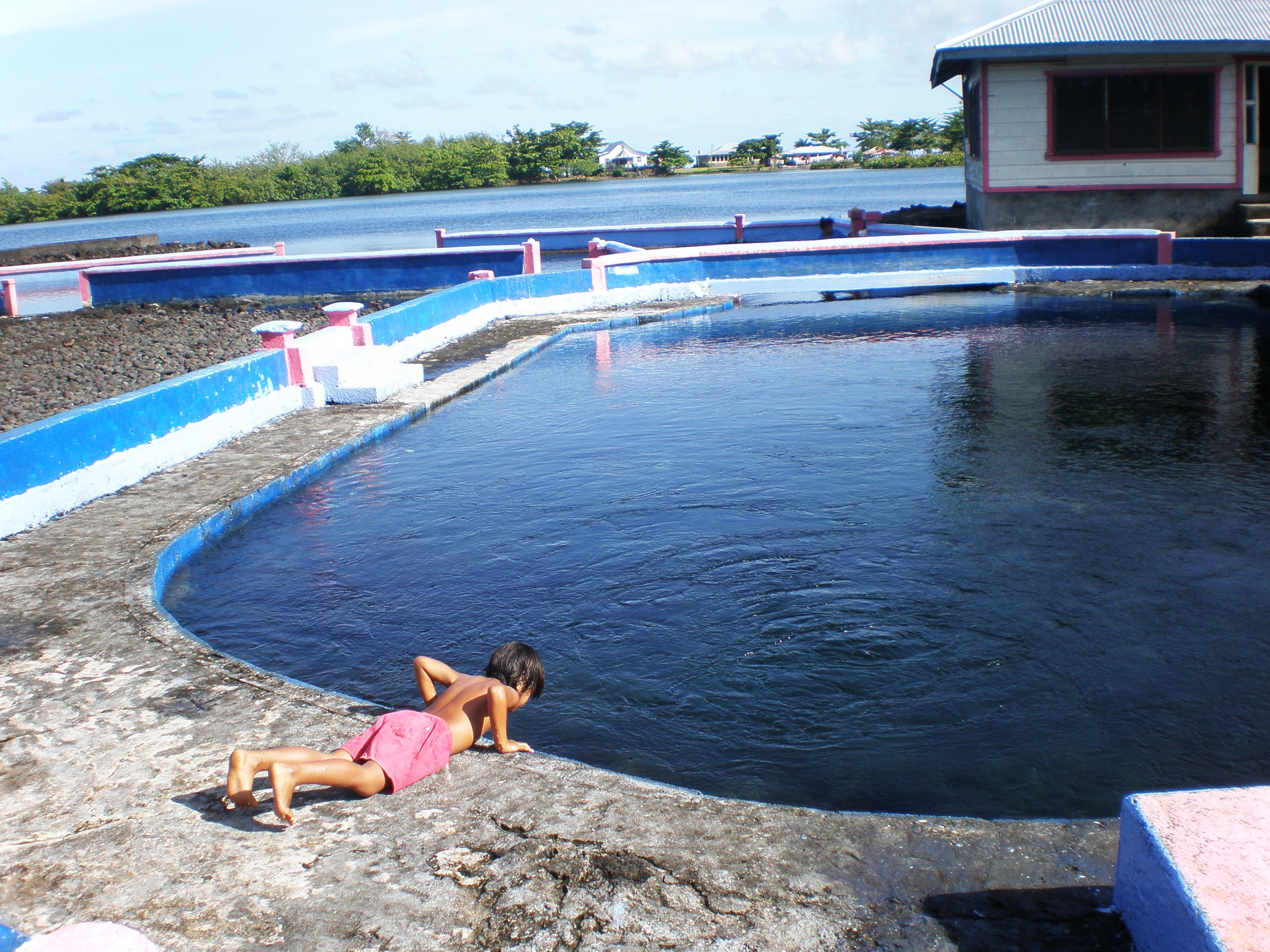
Child having a drink of water at the Mata o le Alelo pool, Matavai village, Savai'i, Samoa

Fāgogo is a Samoan form of storytelling. Traditionally told by the old to the young at night, it is called "a performing art, almost a type of theatre, where people, events and stories are brought to life through the skills, voice and action of a narrator". The stories themselves can incorporate oral history, folk tales, biblical stories, traditional knowledge, or fiction. Fāgogo is a means of informal education and passing on the Samoan language, culture, and values, including Faʻa Sāmoa.

There are several collections of Samoan fāgogo, the most notable being those collected by Augustin Kraemer, Brother Herman, and Richard Moyle. Samoan fāgogo has also influenced the writings of contemporary Samoan writers like Albert Wendt, Sia Figiel and contemporary Samoan interdisciplinary artist Pati Solomona Tyrell. In 2018 he was the youngest nominee at age twenty-five for the New Zealand Walters Prize award for moving image Fāgogo.

Fāgogo stories often tell of the lives of archetypal figures like Sina in the legend Sina and the Eel, Tinilau, and a legendary Tuimanu'a (as different from the historical Tui Manu'a). The story of Sina and the Eel (Sina ma le Tuna) is associated with the Mata o le Alelo pool in the village of Matavai, on the north coast of Savai'i, in Samoa.

The practice of Fāgogo is in decline in both Samoa and among Samoans overseas. Several Samoan expatriate communities have launched efforts to preserve their Fāgogo as a result.

== See also ==
- Moʻolelo
