= Richard Moyle =

New Zealand academic

- Born: Richard Michael Moyle; 1944 (age 81–82); Paeroa, New Zealand
- Education: University of Auckland (PhD)
- Scientific career
- Thesis: Samoan traditional music (1971)
- Website: Staff page

Richard Michael Moyle (born 1944) is a retired New Zealand academic specialising in ethnomusicology of the Pacific and Australia. He splits his time between several Australasian universities.

== Career ==
Moyle earned a PhD from the University of Auckland and his 1971 doctoral thesis was titled Samoan traditional music. Moyle spent many years in and around the Pacific recording songs and oral histories from indigenous peoples. He held teaching positions at Indiana University, the University of Hawaiʻi at Mānoa and the Australian Institute of Aboriginal and Torres Strait Islander Studies before returning to Auckland to become Director of Pacific Studies.

Among his many unique research projects is the collection of recordings of Samoan Fāgogo (folk tales) at the University of Auckland's Archive of Maori and Pacific Music, with some available in print online in Samoan and English.
