= Tofā Sauni =

Tofā Maunu Sauni (c. 1820s-1900s) held the Samoan orator chief title of Sauni for Tufulele, Upolu, Samoa, by the 1890s.

He was the chief Samoan advisor to German ethnologist Dr Augustin Kraemer in Kraemer’s monumental study of Samoa, The Samoan Islands (vols 1-2, 1901 & 1903).

The German medical doctor turned ethnologist regarded Sauni as his ‘best teacher’ and ‘unshakable friend.’ According to Kraemer, Sauni was ‘generally looked upon by other Samoans as one of the wisest men among them.’

Tofā Sauni also helped German scholar Dr Oskar Stübel in his studies of the traditions of Samoa a decade or so before Kraemer. Sauni was known to Stübel as Maunu, of Leulumoega.
