= Jenny Bennett-Tuionetoa =

Samoan writer

Jenny Bennett-Tuionetoa (born c. 1987) is a Samoan writer and LGBTQ rights activist. In 2018, she was the Pacific regional winner of the Commonwealth Short Story Prize.

== Biography ==
Jenny Bennett-Tuionetoa was born in Samoa around 1987. After fighting depression and low self-esteem in her teen years, she began writing in her early 20s. Her first short story was published in the Samoa Observer in 2008, with the support of editor Savea Sano Malifa.

In 2013, Bennett-Tuionetoa graduated with a bachelor's degree from the University of the South Pacific. From 2014 to 2016, she taught English in the university's College of Foundation Studies, on its Alafua campus. As of early 2021, she was pursuing a master's degree in literature from the same university.

Bennett-Tuionetoa has received the most recognition for her short story "Matalasi," meaning "varied" or "many-fold" in Samoan. The story deals with the experiences of a fa'afatama, a third gender person in Samoan culture who was assigned female at birth but possesses both masculine and feminine traits. Bennett-Tuionetoa herself is non-binary.

In 2017, "Matalasi" won in the Samoan category for the Samoa Observer Tusitala Story Competition. Then, in 2018, "Matalasi" was named the winner for the Pacific region of the Commonwealth Short Story Prize.

In addition to her writing, Bennett-Tuionetoa is an activist for LGBTQ rights.
