= Samoa Faʻafafine Association =

Human rights organisation

- Samoa Faʻafafine Association
- Formation: 2006
- Website: https://www.facebook.com/sfainc/

Samoa Faʻafafine Association (SFA) is an organisation based in Samoa, which provides support for LGBTQ+ communities. It organises the annual Miss Faʻafafine pageant, provides sexual health educational programming and advocates for the rights of LGBTQ+ people in Samoa, in particular its faʻafafine communities.

== Background ==
The Samoa Faʻafafine Association (SFA) was founded in 2006, against a background of decades of faʻafafine organising in Samoa. It was initially founded by a group of ten faʻafafine, who came from professional backgrounds. Two of the co-founders were Ymania Brown and To’oto’oali’I Roger Stanley; the latter became the first President of the SFA in 2006. From its inception, the patron of the SFA has been the Samoan president, Tuilaepa Aiono Sailele Malielegaoi. Its website was launched in 2008.

The SFA is aligned with several LGBTQ+ organisations, both in the pacific region and globally, including the International Trans Fund and International Lesbian, Gay, Bisexual, Trans and Intersex Association.

== Campaigns ==
The SFA works closely with the Ministry of Health on HIV awareness campaigns. They also raise awareness and run educational programmes relating to other sexual health issues. In 2013, lobbying by the SFA led to the successful repeal of laws prohibiting 'female impersonation'. In 2016 the SFA was outspoken at the treatment in the Samoan press of the death by suicide of a member of their community, a photograph of whose naked body was published on the front page of the Sunday Samoan. The article also deliberately misgendered Jeanine Tuivaiki, which the SFA also objected to. In 2016, the SFA organised Samoa's inaugural National Faʻafafine Week, funded by the US Embassy to Samoa. In 2019 the SFA led protests against the censorship of the biopic film Rocketman, based on the life of Elton John.

=== Faʻatama ===
Whilst faʻafafine are people assigned male at birth who 'live in the manner of women', faʻatama are people assigned female at birth who 'live in the manner' of men. The SFA was divided as to whether faʻatama should be part of the organisation until 2015, when their membership expanded to include them. However their first faʻatama member did not join until 2017. The same year, the SFA organised Samoa's first formal gathering of faʻatama, bringing together members of the community who did not previously know one another, to create a network and to better understand how the SFA can help to advocate for their needs.

=== Fundraising ===
The SFA organises the Miss Faʻafafine pageant, which raises money for their community work, as well as raising awareness of LGBT rights. It is now customary for the Prime Minister of Samoa to open the event. Royalties from the book Samoan Queer Lives, written by Dan Taulapapa McMullin and Yuki Kihara, are donated to the SFA.

== Notable people ==
- Toʻotoʻoaliʻi Roger Stanley - President, 2006-2018.
- Alex Suʻa - President, 2018 onwards.
