= Amao Leota Lu =

Samoan fa'afafine performance artist

- Born: 1971 (age 54–55)
- Occupations: Performance artist, poet, LGBT rights activist

Amao Leota Lu (born 1971) is a Samoan fa’afafine, who is a performance artist, poet and community activist.

== Biography ==
Amao Leota Lu was born in 1971 in Auckland, New Zealand. Her early years were spent there, before emigrating with some of her Samoan diaspora family to Sydney in the 1980s. She returned to Australia after a period away in her early twenties and it was during this time that she came to terms with her gender identity as a woman and as a fa'afafine. She uses her performances to advocate for fa'afafine identity, particularly in resistance to western LGBT categorisations. These performances are situated at the confluence of gender identity, Pacific culture and intersectionality.

In 2020 she curated the very first queer Pacific event at Midsumma Festival in Melbourne, and performed there with an event entitled Pacific Essence: Tales of a Migrant Plantation, which was staged at the Immigration Museum. In 2019 she was part of the ensemble cast of Gender Euphoria, which was staged as part of Melbourne International Arts Festival. Her performances are part of a "cult phenomena" where queer perspectives are combined with "Indigenous knowledge-making". Leota Lu is also outspoken about the discrimination that gender diverse members Pacific Islander communities still face. Former occupations have included community support worker.
