= Faʻafafine =

Third gender in Samoan culture

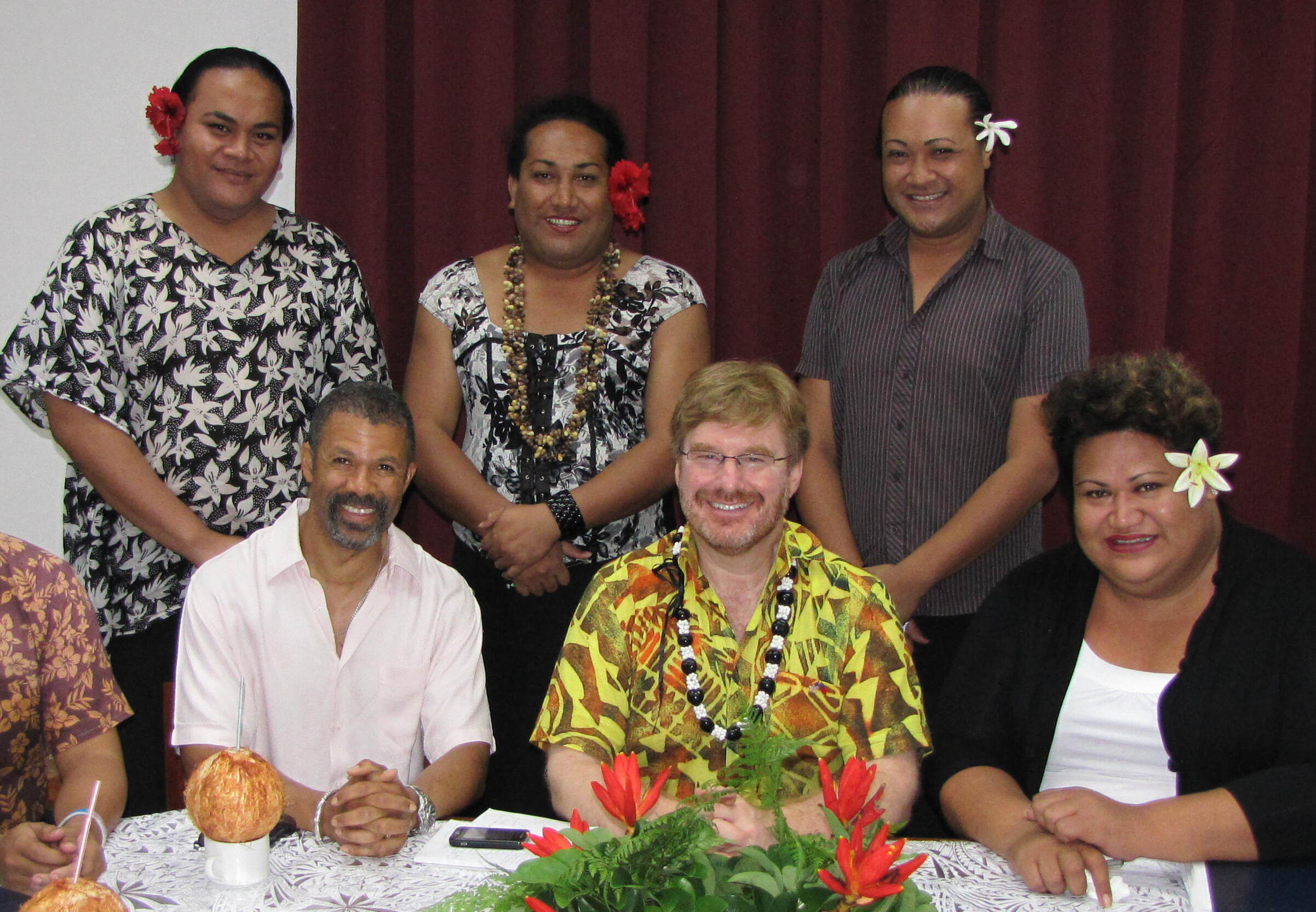
- Leaders of the Samoa Fa’afafine Association with U.S. Ambassador David Huebner (bottom center, in glasses) in 2011
- Etymology: Samoan prefix faʻa-, meaning "in the manner of" + fafine, meaning "woman"
- Classification: Gender identity

Other terms
- Synonyms: Fakafāfine, Fiafifine, Fakafifine
- Associated terms: Fakaleiti, two-spirit, trans woman, Akava'ine, Māhū

Demographics
- Culture: Samoan
Regions with significant populations
- Polynesia
- Samoa: Up to 3.5% of natal males

Faʻafāfine (Samoan pronunciation: [faʔafafine]; lit. 'in the manner of a woman') are natal males who align with a third gender or feminine gender role in the Sāmoan Islands. Faʻafāfine are not assigned the role at birth, nor raised as girls due to a lack of daughters, as is often claimed in western media. Rather, their femininity emerges in early childhood, and Sāmoans recognize them as distinct from typical boys.

Faʻafāfine are androphilic (attracted to males) and are usually very feminine. They comprise up to 3.5% of the natal male population, similar to the number of androphilic natal males in the west.

Most self-identify as faʻafāfine, rather than men, while a small number identify as women. However, they recognize that they are distinct from females.

Faʻafāfine enjoy relatively high levels of acceptance in Sāmoa. They can be seen in all areas of Sāmoan society, whether assisting as caregivers or working in government. Sāmoa's former Prime Minister Malielegaoi spoke publicly about the value of faʻafāfine in Sāmoan society.

== History and terminology ==
The word faʻafāfine includes the causative prefix faʻa–, meaning "in the manner of", and the word fafine, meaning "woman". It is a cognate of related words in other Polynesian languages, such as Tongan: fakaleiti or fakafefine, the Cook Islands Māori: akava'ine, and Māori: whakawāhine. Ultimately, Western terms like gay and transgender overlap but do not align exactly with Samoan gender terms found in the traditional culture of Sāmoa.

The Sāmoan slang word mala (devastation) is a less-common term for faʻafāfine, originating in fundamentalist-influenced homophobia and transphobia.

Strong evidence points to Samoa being under matriarchal rule for centuries before contact with Europeans. Queen Salamasina, holder of four paramount chief titles, ascended the throne in the 16th century through the shrewd maneuvering of the powerful female chieftains around her. Samoa continues to value the leadership roles of women and third gender people. There is no restriction on the transfer of chiefly titles to women or fa'afafine, and there is a substantial list of past and present faʻafafine chiefs.

The history of faʻafāfine is difficult to trace. Nafanua, the female warrior and chief of Samoan early history, is sometimes held up as an icon of faʻafāfine. Since the 1980s, the Sāmoan diaspora has given faʻafāfine a higher profile outside Samoa.

Paul L. Vasey, Professor of Psychology at the University of Lethbridge, has claimed that the existence of faʻafafine supports the evolutionary psychology hypothesis of a gene that directs kin-directed altruism, which proposes that androphilia could be passed down because it is societally advantageous to have non-traditional roles. The hypothesis proposes that the existence of androphilia may serve the evolutionary purpose of providing avunculate support for related kin, meaning that families that include faʻafafine and members in other non-traditional roles, such as unmarried aunts and uncles, would have more time and resources to dedicate to the success of their kin.

== Role in Samoan society ==
The existence of a third gender is so well-accepted in Sāmoan culture that most Sāmoans state that they have friendships with at least one faʻafāfine. However, faʻafāfine are not fully accepted in all parts of the community, such as by some fundamentalist Christian groups and traditional leaders.

Sāmoan popular culture views faʻafafine as hard-working and dedicated to the family, in the Sāmoan tradition of tautua or service to family. Ideas of the family in Sāmoa and Polynesia include all the members of a sā, or communal family within the faʻamatai family system. Traditionally, faʻafāfine follow the training of the women's daily work in an aiga (Sāmoan family group). Faʻafāfine state that they "loved" engaging in feminine activities as children, such as playing with female peers, playing female characters during role play, dressing in feminine clothes, and playing with female gender-typical toys. This is in contrast to women who stated that they merely "liked" engaging in those activities as children. Some faʻafāfine recall believing they were girls in childhood. In Sāmoa, there is very seldom ridicule or displeasure towards a biologically male child who states that they are a girl. One study showed only a minority of parents (20 per cent) tried to stop their faʻafafine children from engaging in feminine behaviour. Being pushed into the male gender role is upsetting to many faʻafāfine. A significant number stated that they "hated" masculine play, such as rough games and sports, even more than females did as children.

Faʻafāfine have sexual relationships almost exclusively with men who do not identify as faʻafāfine. However, sexual relations between people assigned male at birth is a crime in Sāmoa.

== Society of Faʻafāfine in American Sāmoa and the Samoa Faʻafāfine Association ==
The Society of Faʻafāfine in American Sāmoa or (Samoan: Le Sosaiete o Faʻafafine i Amerika Samoa) (SOFIAS) describes itself as an organisation dedicated to balancing both Samoan values with western influences and aims to promote a positive attitude toward the Samoan faʻafāfine community. It fosters collaboration between faʻafāfine and LGBTQI+ communities in American Sāmoa, the Asia Pacific region, and the world. The Miss SOFIAS pageant has been held in Pago Pago, American Samoa, since 1979.

The Sāmoa Fa'afāfine Association (SFA), based in Apia, was founded in 2006. It works closely with government, churches, and youth organisations, supporting community projects for the fa'afāfine community, but also for elders and youth in Samoa. SFA is also active on the international level, working with the United Nations and Pacific regional NGOs, on behalf of the faʻafāfine, transgender, and LGBT communities of the Pacific Islands. They also work with media organisations to promote an equitable representation of faʻafāfine.

The SFA, with fa'afāfine lawyers Alex Suʻa and Phineas Hartson Matautia, have initiated legislative activity on issues of LGBT rights in Sāmoa. Their efforts to repeal homophobic and transphobic laws implemented during the period of New Zealand colonial rule have met with partial success. In 2013, the Samoan Government updated its criminal law in the Crimes Act 2013, including sexual offences. The 2013 changes included the decriminalisation of female ‘impersonation’, affirming the rights of fa'afāfine. Notably, the term ‘sexual connections’ was defined broadly under section 50 to include oral and anal sex, and was drafted in a gender-neutral manner. However, section 67 continued to criminalise sodomy, meaning that although it is no longer a crime to be visibly fa'afāfine, it is a crime for two people assigned male at birth to have sexual intercourse. The maximum penalty for sodomy where both people are male and over the age of 16 is 5 years imprisonment. The maximum penalty for keeping a place of resort for homosexual acts is 7 years imprisonment.

Same-sex marriage, like homosexual intercourse, is still unlawful in Sāmoa, and despite legalisation in the U.S., it is still not recognised in the U.S. Territory of American Sāmoa.

== In film ==
Paradise Bent: Boys will be Girls in Samoa, is a 1999 Australian documentary film written, directed, and co-produced by Heather Croall, which tells the story of traditional Samoan faʻafafines, and the impact of newer western drag artists on the culture. The film screened in many international festivals from 1999 until 2002, and won the Silver Plaque at the Chicago International Film Festival.

== Notable faʻafāfine ==
- Edward Cowley a.k.a. "Buckwheat" – a drag performer and television personality based in Auckland, worked with New Zealand AIDS Foundation, champion bodybuilder.
- Yuki Kihara – a contemporary artist whose work has been featured in numerous museum exhibitions art galleries around the world. Her solo exhibition, Shigeyuki Kihara: Living Photographs (2008–9), was the Metropolitan Museum of Art's first exhibition of contemporary Samoan art. Kihara is co-editor of the 2018 book Samoan Queer Lives.
- Kween Kong – a New Zealand drag queen based in Adelaide, known for competing on the second season of Drag Race Down Under, where she placed as a Runner Up. She would later return to compete again on RuPaul's Drag Race Global All Stars, where she would place as a Runner Up again.
- Nikita Iman - New Zealand drag queen based in Sydney, known for competing on fourth season of Drag Race Down Under, where she placed 5th. She is also Kween Kong's drag sister.
- Amao Leota Lu – performance artist, activist, community leader
- Marion Malena – a multiple beauty pageant winner and performer from American Samoa currently living in Seattle. She hosts the Facebook group American Samoa: Through the Years.
- Fuimaono Karl Pulotu-Endemann – a medical professional, Justice of the Peace, and gay activist from New Zealand. In the 2001 New Year Honours, Pulotu-Endemann was made a Member of the New Zealand Order of Merit for services to Public Health.
- Jaiyah Saelua – American Samoan soccer player. Saelua was the first faʻafafine player to compete in a men's FIFA World Cup qualifier. Saelua featured in a UK documentary Next Goal Wins. In the feature film Next Goal Wins (2023 film) based on the events in the documentary, Saelua is played by faʻafafine actor Kaimana.
- Shalimar Seuili - model, dancer, and sex worker
- Dan Taulapapa McMullin – poet, painter, filmmaker. Artist book: The Healer's Wound: A Queer Theirstory of Polynesia, published by Pu'uhonua Society and Tropic Editions of Honolulu. Exhibitions and screenings at Honolulu Museum of Art, De Young Museum, Museum of Contemporary Native Art, Bishop Museum, Metropolitan Museum, United Nations, Museum of Modern Art. Collection of poems: Coconut Milk (American Library Association Top Ten LGBT Books of the Year).
- Leilani Tominiko – first openly transgender professional wrestler in New Zealand.

== Fictional faʻafāfine ==
- Half-man half-girl, an unnamed character in Albert Wendt's novel Flying Fox in a Freedom Tree (1979)
- Muli and Pipi, in Dan Taulapapa McMullin's poem "The Bat" (1993), which received a Poets&Writers Award
- Sugar Shirley, a character in Sia Figiel's novel Where We Once Belonged (1996)
- 'Vili Atafa, a character in the Pasifika play A Frigate Bird Sings (1996) by Oscar Kightley, David Fane and Nathaniel Lees
- Sinalela (2001), a fictional character in the short film Sinalela by Dan Taulapapa McMullin, awarded Best Short Film in the Honolulu Rainbow Film Festival
- Fa'afāfine (2001), an autobiographical solo performance piece by Brian Fuata
- Brother Ken in bro'Town (2004–2009), a school principal
- Jerry the Faʻafāfine (2011), a thematic figure (influenced by the poetry of Taulapapa) in an artwork series by Tanu Gago

== See also ==
- Bakla (binabae) – equivalent gender identity in the Philippines
- Faʻatama - masculine counterpart
- Hijra – similar gender identity in South Asia
- Kathoey – similar gender identity in Thailand
- Moe aikāne – homosexual or bisexual relationships among Native Hawaiians
- Takatāpui – Term for LGBTQ Māori
- Two-spirit – similar gender identity in Native American culture
