= Dan Taulapapa McMullin =

American Samoan non-binary fa'afafine writer and artist

Dan Taulapapa McMullin (born May 23, 1957) is an American Samoan artist, known for their poetry, visual art and film. Their major themes are their indigenous Samoan heritage and their fa'afafine gender identity. McMullin has been creating literary and artistic works for over 35 years, and has received numerous awards, fellowships, and grants. They work in a variety of literary styles and visual art modes. In their adult life, they have spent time in Los Angeles (where they worked for many years), and now live with their husband in Hudson, New York.

== Childhood and education ==
McMullin was born in Japan into a military family, and spent their toddler years in Germany, before moving to American Samoa as a young child where they were raised on Tutuila Island in the villages of Malaeloa and Leone They are of Samoan, Hawaiian, English and Jewish-Irish descent, their father was Samuelu Sailele McMullin of Leone Tutuila and their mother was Lupelele Iosefa McMullin of the Satuimanu'a. Their childhood home on Samoa has been described as "a traditional Samoan fale roundhouse with coral stone flooring and sugarcane thatching, brought up making indigenous siapo barkcloth painting by their great-grandmother Fa'asapa." They attended Cal Arts in their early education and later received their MFA from Claremont Graduate University and their BA from University of California, Irvine. They spent much of their early career in television and then theater, before leaving those industries to focus on poetry and visual art. They have taught both poetry and painting at the University of the South Pacific, for the California Arts Council, for the American Samoa Arts Council and the American Samoan Humanities Council.

== Gender and heritage ==
McMullin's indigenous heritage and queer identity are central to their artistic work, as both themes and sources of inspiration. In a 2013 interview, when asked which non-artist most influences their work, they replied: "My old man, my boyfriend, usually in bed after yadda yadda, looking out the windows at the hills of Laguna, California where we are. It's moments like that I'm back in Samoa again, my soul is; and ideas come easily, like mangoes hitting a tin roof in the rain."

McMullin identifies as fa'afafine, a Samoan third gender for which there is no exact English translation, but which is often described as a man who lives as a woman. Describing fa'afafine in an artist statement introducing their poetry and photography for the USC Cinema journal Spectator, McMullin writes:

"The standard practice among fa'afafine (MTF) and fa'afatama (FTM) is that one's sexual partners are "straight": fa'afafine do not see ourselves as women, but also do not identify as gay men. It is sometimes said that a fa'afafine is a relatively new role in Samoan society beginning with the advent of foreign influence, however the role of fa'afafine in prevalent throughout Polynesia and is indicated by indigenous words such as fakafafine in Tonga, and mahu in eastern Polynesia. These indigenous words are without foreign etymology."

McMullin, in an artist's statement in June 2016, said "Often, not always, but often my work looks at sexuality and the body. The body as memory, a key to our historical presences, to my own story and my oratory. There is a great cleft and an eternal return to the past, but the past is only a way to continue the journey into the future. A looking back as a way of setting the sail toward whatever my own indigenous futurism defines."

McMullin has written personal narratives reflecting on both their gender and indigenous identity. In a 2011 essay for the Amerasia Journal they explore what it means to be Fa'afafine, both from a personal and historical context. In an essay for The Poetry Foundation blog, McMullin says "Identity is not something we claim, it is something that claims us."

== Creative works ==
=== Writing ===
McMullin's poetry and essays have been primarily published in anthologies focused on LGBTQ or Pacific Island indigenous literature. McMullin's first full-length poetry collection, Coconut Milk (2013) was named in the American Library Association's Over the Rainbow top-ten overall category.

McMullin's more experimental poetry, such as their poetry published in Poetry Magazine in 2016, often blends the boundaries between poetry, visual poetry, and visual art. For instance, their poem "The Doors of the Sea":

"the blood red dust of life
as my brother's face
disappeared beneath us
beneath the ship which carried us and the goddess
to where we do no know
leaving the war of my grandfather

the smell of smoke following us."

Before the publication of Coconut Milk, McMullin had already been widely published, and their solo collections included a poetry chapbook, A Drag Queen Named Pipi (2004) from Tinfish Press and a children's book My Name is Laloifi (2005).

=== Visual art ===
McMullin began making visual art around 2004 while living in Apia Samoa. Around 2011 or slightly earlier, they began to explore the concept of the cultural appropriation of Samoan art and culture, or Tiki Kitsch as it is sometimes called. Much of their work since that time has been influenced by this shift. In a 2012 artist statement McMullin writes:

"...looking at kitsch art has made me question all my assumptions about the Samoan artistic practice, and to search for alternative meaning in our conceptions of the traditional, realizing that my work relied on appropriated meanings and visual misinterpretations or a dumbing down of meaning. So i began making abstract paintings influenced by Samoan siapo and weaving. As well as the intellectual lives of the many indigenous and women and fa'afafine/whakawahine artists who inspired me."

In addition to painting, McMullin also does a significant amount of work in sculpture, collage, installation and photography. McMullin's work has been featured in over a dozen solo exhibits – including installations at the Museum of Contemporary Native Art in Santa Fe (2021) and at the Honolulu Museum of Art for the Hawai'i Triennial (2022) – and in over 50 group exhibitions across the United States.

In a 2010 interview as artist in residence at de Young, McMullin discussed the physical make up of their works, as well as how the many media in which they work organically influence each other:

"In the past year or so, I've been working in various media for sculptures and installations, including plaster, red earth, plant fibers, altered furniture, oil paint, resin, and cloth. The sculptures in turn are influencing my paintings, which was once almost all realistic in its approach, but through the influence of my sculpture, I'm now incorporating abstract shapes."

=== Film ===
Of McMullin's many short films Sinalela (2001) and 100 Tikis (2016) received the most acclaim, and have shown at film festivals and museums internationally including in French Polynesia, France, Australia and New Zealand. Sinalela was filmed on a hand held camera in Samoa, and draws on the fairy tale Cinderella as well as a Samoan proverbial tale (a fa'agogo). 100 Tikis, an indigenous appropriation art film, has shown at the Museum of Modern Art with Sinalela, as well as internationally.

== List of recent and notable exhibitions, publications, awards and honors ==
=== Writing (fiction, poetry, and essays) ===
- 2024-2022: The Healer's Wound: A Queer Theirstory of Polynesia artist book published by Pu'uhonua Society with Tropic Editions of Honolulu, 1st Edition 2022, 2nd Edition 2024.
- 2018: Samoan Queer Lives co-edited, published by Huia Press, Aotearoa-New Zealand
- 2016: Over My Queer Samoan Body published on The Poetry Foundation’s website
- 2016: Pacific Islander Portfolio published in Poetry Magazine
- 2014: poem "Tiki Manifesto" published in anthology Huihui: Navigating Art and Literature in the Pacific by University of Hawai'i Press
- 2013: Coconut Milk, McMullin’s first full length poetry collection published by University of Arizona Press
- 2011: Poems published in Sovereign Erotics, anthology of LGBTQ indigenous writers
- 2010: Short story "Monsieur Cochon" published in The Contemporary Pacific by University of Hawai'i Press
- 2005: My Name is Laloifi a children’s book published by Learning Media Limited of New Zealand
- 2004: A Drag Queen Named Pipi, poetry chapbook published by Tinfish Press
- 2002: Short story published in One Story Magazine #10 (New York)

=== Art exhibitions ===
- 2022: Hawai'i Triennial HT22, Honolulu, HI
- 2021: Exposures exhibition Museum of Contemporary Native Art MoCNA-IAIA, Santa Fe, NM
- 2020: Hudson Eye, Hudson, NY
- 2017: Auē Away sculpture in performance Metropolitan Museum, New York, NY
- 2016 Los Angeles Public Art Biennial, LA: Water, Los Angeles, CA (group exhibition)
- 2014: University of Hawaii Manoa, Hawaii, NY
- 2011: Gorman Museum, Davis, CA
- 2010: De Young Museum, San Francisco, CA
- 2010: Pacific Islander Ethnic Museum, Long Beach, CA
- 2008: Boomali Gallery, Sydney, Australia

=== Film ===
- 2016: 100 Tikis, shown at the Présence Autochone Film Festival (Montréal, Canada) and the Wairoa Maori Film Festival and Auckland Art Gallery (New Zealand)
  - 2023: Museum of Modern Art MOMA Post Doc Screening with kekahi wahi
- 2001: Sinalela, winner of best short film at the Honolulu Rainbow Film Festival
  - 2002: the International Lesbian and Gay Film Festival (San Francisco),
  - 2002: Outfest (Los Angeles)
  - 2003: Mardi Gras Film Festival (Sydney, Australia)
  - 2023: Museum of Modern Art, NYC

=== Awards, honors ===
- 2014: Coconut Milk named one of the American Library Association's Over the Rainbow Top-Ten Books for 2013
- 2002: Sinalela won Best Short Film Award at the Honolulu Rainbow Film Festival
- 1997: Poets&Writers Award from The Writer's Loft
- 1989: Nominated for an Emmy from the Academy of Television Arts & Sciences for the L.A. Area

=== Residencies, fellowships ===
- American Samoa Arts & Humanities Artist Residencies
- De Young Museum Artist-in-Residence
- Gay Games Indigenous Arts Festival
- Jerome Playwrights Fellowship
- Keomailani Foundation PIKO Artist Residency
- California Arts Council Artist Residency
- University of the South Pacific Writers Residency and Artist Residency at Oceania Centre for the Arts USP
- Macmillan Brown Centre for Pacific Studies, Research Scholar Residency University of Canterbury
- Waiariki Institute of Technology Artist-in-Residence

== See also ==
- List of Samoans
