= Augustin Kraemer =

German naturalist and ethnographer

- Krämer
- Born: August 27, 1865; Los Ángeles, Chile
- Died: November 11, 1941 (aged 76); Stuttgart, Germany
- Known for: Ethnographic research in the South Pacific

Augustin Friedrich Kraemer or Krämer (27 August 1865 – 11 November 1941) was a German naturalist and ethnographer. Kraemer was a navy surgeon who worked in the Polynesia in 1893–95 and 1897–99.

== Research ==
Kraemer wrote the Palau sections of Georg Thilenius five-volume ethnographic documentation of the Hamburg Südsee Expedition, which sailed through Micronesia to record the island peoples and their way of life during the early 1900s (Palau, Ergebnissse der Südsee-Expedition, herausgegeben von Dr G. Thilenius 1926, Hamburg). His second voyage is described in Hawaii, Ostmikronesien und Samoa. Meine zweite Südseereise (1897–1899) zum Studium der Atolle und ihrer Bewohner published in Stuttgart by Strecker & Schröder, 1906.

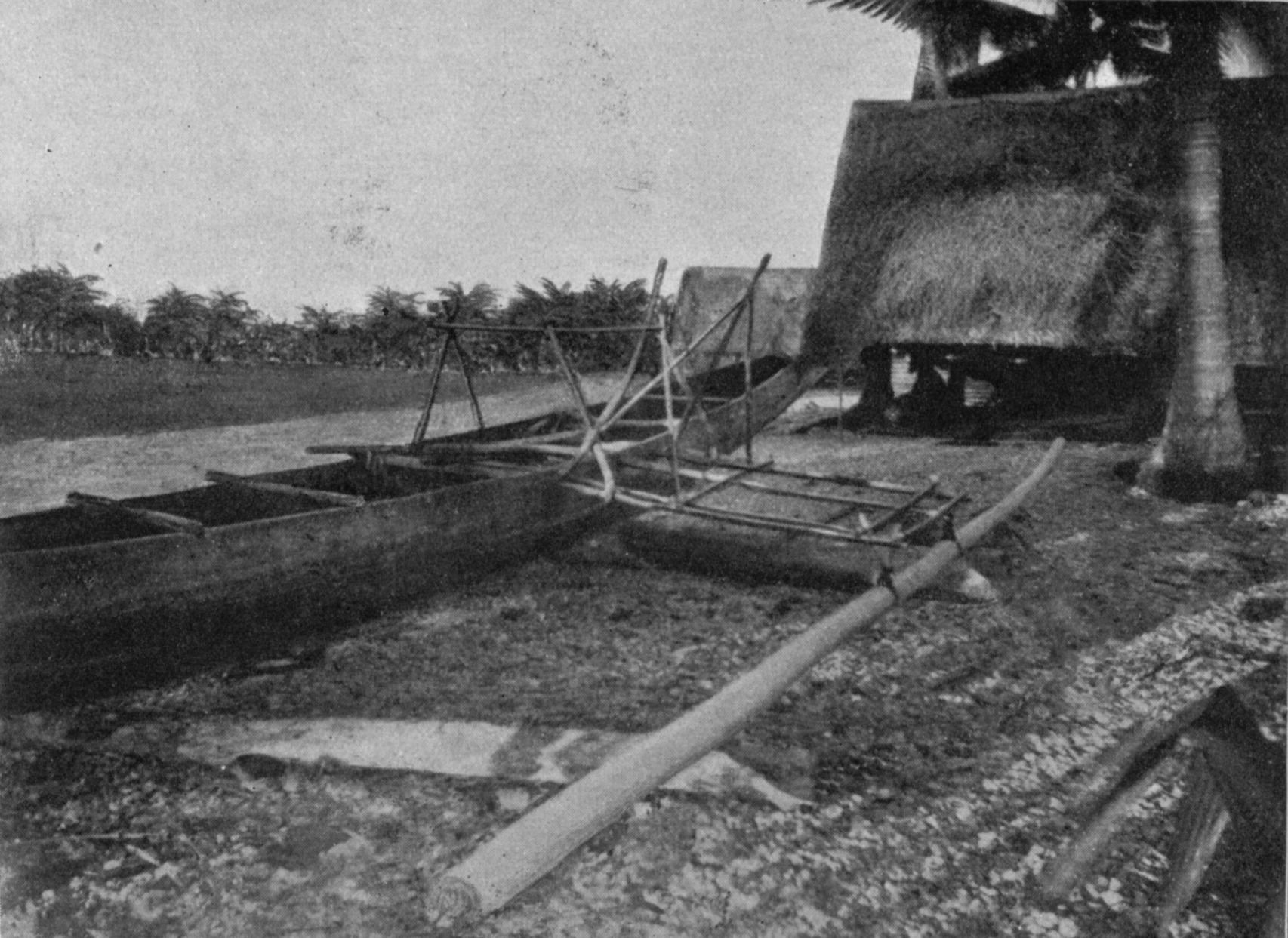
Photograph of Traditional house and canoe taken in Nauru by Kraemer

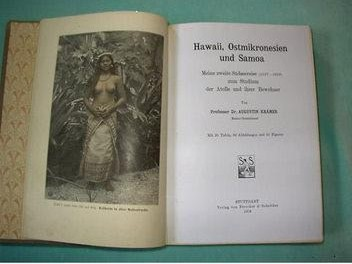
Hawaii, Ostmikronesien und Samoa. Meine zweite Südseereise

His extensive study of Samoan culture contained in Die Samoa Inseln (1903) is revered by the modern Samoans because of the detailed genealogies, village honorifics (fa'alupega), and details of chiefly rhetoric he included. However, linguistic analysis of his diaries indicates that he had extensive assistance of a Samoan chief, Tofā Sauni. The depth of this involvement by Tofā Sauni in Krämer's study should have led to him being a co-author of the volume by modern ethical standard in ethnography.

== Personal life ==
Kraemer married Elisabeth Bannow (1874-1945) in 1904.

She accompanied her husband on three of his expeditions in the German colonial areas of the Pacific: 1906/07 through the Bismarck archipelago to the Palau Islands, 1908 to New Ireland and 1909/10 as members of the Hamburg South Sea expedition, which her husband led. She was the only female member of all three trips. Krämer-Bannow worked, often under difficult conditions, as a painter and photographer. The couple later utilised their works in his publications. Their observations about women's lives contributed significantly to the research.

In 1916, she published a book Bei kunstsinnigen kannibalen der Südsee, wanderungen auf Neu-Mecklenburg 1908-1909 (Among Art-Loving Cannibals of the South Seas).
