= Black Workers Congress =

African-American political organisation

- Founded: December 12, 1970; 55 years ago
- Ideology: African-American communism
- Political position: Far-left
- Colors: Black

The Black Workers Congress (BWC) was created on December 12, 1970 in response to a manifesto written by the League of Revolutionary Black Workers (League). The BWC would be a separate organization that would be used to expand the League across the United States. The BWC was also used to coordinate Revolutionary Union Movement and Black Workers caucuses.

The mission of the BWC:

Our objective: workers' control of their place of work, the factories, fields, offices, transportation services, and communications facilities, so that the exploitation of labor will cease and no person or corporation will get rich off the labor of another person. All people will work for the collective benefit of humanity.

It is estimated that the BWC brought in between 300-400 people at its first national conference held on Labor Day weekend in Gary Indiana, September 4–5, 1971. It accepted Hispanic, Asian, and Native American affiliates. The BWC was not able to exceed that number as time went on. While the BWC was getting a firm foundation, the League of Revolutionary Black Workers began to split apart. The culmination of this split was the BWC being composed of intellectuals while the League continued on with the workers. The BWC never achieved its goals and was never able to establish itself with membership or influence in the greater society.

== Notable members ==
- Ken Cockrel Sr.
- Carl Dix
- James Forman
- Mike Hamlin
- John Watson
- Darnell Stephen Summers
