= Kenneth Cockrel Sr. =

American politician and activist (1938–1989)

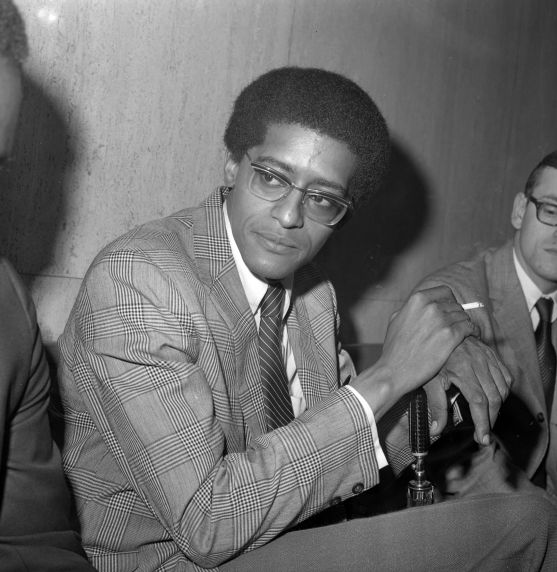

Member of the Detroit Common Council
- In office 1978–1982
- Preceded by: Carl Levin
- Succeeded by: Mel Ravitz

Personal details
- Born: Kenneth Vern Cockrel, Sr. November 5, 1938 Royal Oak Township, Michigan, U.S.
- Died: April 25, 1989 (aged 50) Detroit, Michigan, U.S.
- Party: Democratic
- Spouse: Sheila Cockrel
- Children: 2, including Kenneth Jr.
- Education: Wayne State University
- Profession: Lawyer, Community Organizer, Revolutionary, Politician

Kenneth Vern "Ken" Cockrel Sr. (November 5, 1938 – April 25, 1989) was an American politician, prominent attorney, and revolutionary, community organizer, from the city of Detroit. Cockrel served as a member of Detroit's Common Council, from his swearing-in in 1978 until 1982. In addition to winning major cases representing poor and working class Detroiters, Cockrel rose to political prominence as he helped organize social and political movements, including the League of Revolutionary Black Workers and other radical black, Marxist formations.

== Early life ==
Kenneth Vern Cockrel was born November 5, 1938, in Royal Oak Township, a poor, black community just across Detroit's northern border. His father, Sye Cockrel, worked at the Ford Highland Park plant and his mother, Cynthia Cockrel, was the first African-American graduate of Lincoln High School in Ferndale, Michigan. Both parents died when Cockrel was twelve years old and he went to live with relatives in Detroit. Cockrel attended Northwestern and Central High Schools but dropped out of high school in 1955 at the age of seventeen. After dropping out, Ken joined the United States Air Force, trained as a weapons technician (with special security clearance) and was stationed in Germany as an airman second class. After his discharge in 1959, Cockrel returned to the United States and entered Wayne State University and enrolled in a special program for adults without diplomas; he graduated in 1964 with a degree in political science. Realizing that law would be at the center of the struggle for social and economic justice, Ken immediately enrolled in Wayne State's law school and received his Juris Doctor degree in 1967.

== Activism ==
Ken Cockrel took a job at the Detroit News to support himself while in school. There he met Mike Hamlin and John Watson, who were organizing black auto workers against abuses at auto plants and against racist, unresponsive, and corrupted union leadership within the UAW. With many others, they formed the League of Revolutionary Black Workers in 1969 as an organization that united local "Revolutionary Union Movements" (like Dodge Revolutionary Union Movement (DRUM)). In 1971, due to political and personal differences Cockrel resigned from the League and the Black Workers Congress. As a result, Cockrel and some Motor City Labor League defectors formed the multi-racial Labor Defense Coalition, an organization which would prove instrumental in forcing the dismantling of STRESS, the undercover police unit hated in Detroit's black community for heinous (sometimes deadly) abuses.

== Legal career ==
In the late 1960s, Cockrel helped found Philo, Maki, Ravitz, Pitts, Moore, Cockrel & Robb, a law firm which, under various names, provided legal representation for individuals and organizations involved in the struggle against political and economic repression. Over the next ten years, he and his colleagues earned reputations as crusaders for working and poor people, winning a number of high-profile cases that put the establishment on trial—the judiciary and jury selection process in the case following the New Bethel raid incident, the corporation and assembly line in the incredibly successful defense of autoworker James Johnson, the police in the defense of Hayward Brown and Madeline Fletcher. In 1973, the Detroit Branch of the NAACP awarded Cockrel the Distinguished Achievement Medal for his legal work representing members of various social justice movements facing political repression and intimidation by the police and prosecutors.

== City Council ==
In 1977, Ken Cockrel was elected to a seat on the Detroit Common Council as an "independent socialist." A number of the community members, volunteers, and his close political allies who worked on his Council campaign formed an organization known as the Detroit Alliance for a Rational Economy (DARE). This organization served as a research team that helped brief Cockrel on topics like tax abatements for wealthy developers and corporations and public health. DARE also served as a mass political force that called for strong community control of the most basic urban institutions. Using this arm of his political network for support and mobilizing power, Cockrel often stood out as a lone voice pushing back against Mayor Coleman Young's collaborations with wealthy developers while supporting his efforts to stamp out police brutality and corruption. His close comrade and campaign manager, Sheila Murphy, became his chief of staff. Ken Cockrel had become the most well-known and influential radical in the city, respected, even by his adversaries, for his intellect, rapid-fire eloquence and passionate commitment to fighting inequity and injustice.

In 1980 a documentary called "Taking Back Detroit", directed by Stephen Lighthill, was released which examined the efforts of Cockrel and Recorder's Court Judge Justin Ravitz.

Disillusioned at his inability to use his Council position to improve conditions in the city, he decided not to run for re-election in 1981; he would serve on the Council until 1982. According to then Michigan Supreme Court Justice and eventual Mayor of Detroit, Dennis Archer, Ken had a great deal of respect for Mayor Coleman Young even though they were political adversaries on a number of economic and social issues; he states in a media appearance in May 1989 that Sheila Cockrel indicated that the week Ken died, they were having dinner with Coleman Young.

== Personal life ==
While at Wayne State University, Cockrel met his first wife, Carol White; they married and had a son, future Detroit City Council President, and eventual Mayor, Ken Cockrel, Jr.

By 1988, Cockrel had returned to the practice of law, ultimately rejoining his friend and former colleague, Justin Ravitz, at Sommers, Schwartz, Silver & Schwartz, and was considering a run for mayor when he died of a heart attack on April 25, 1989.

In 1978, Ken Cockrel married his longtime political ally and campaign manager (and future City Councilwoman) Sheila Murphy. Together they had one daughter, Katherine (or Katy). Katy produced a film featured in the 2019 Detroit Free Press Film Festival titled "Dare to Struggle, Dare to Win", chronicling Ken's work against police brutality in Detroit, successfully helping to abolish STRESS. The film won the festival's audience choice award.
