= African-American leftism =

Black American political currents in favor of social equality and egalitarianism

African-American leftism refers to left-wing political currents that have developed among various African-American communities in the United States. These currents are active around social issues, and often call for an African-American led movement that aims at bringing about communism and socialism between the African-American community and White community and other minority groups.

== Organizations ==
- African Blood Brotherhood
- Black Liberation Army
- Black Panthers
- Black Radical Congress
- Black Socialists in America
- Coalition of Black Trade Unionists
- Detroit Revolutionary Union Movement
- League of Revolutionary Black Workers
- National Brotherhood of Workers of America
- Sojourner Truth Organization
- W.E.B. Du Bois Clubs of America
- Black Alliance for Peace

== See also ==
- Civil rights movement (1896–1954)
- Afro-Caribbean leftism
- The Communist Party USA and African-Americans
- Black conservatism in the United States
- Black-Palestinian solidarity
- Hip hop and social injustice
