= Cathy J. Cohen =

American writer

- Born: 1962 (age 63–64)
- Known for: Audre Lorde Project, Black Youth Project, BYP100
- Title: D. Gale Johnson Distinguished Service Professor of Political Science

Academic background
- Education: University of Michigan, Miami University

Academic work
- Discipline: Political Science
- Doctoral students: Vanessa C. Tyson
- Main interests: African American politics, women and politics, lesbian and gay politics, and social movements
- Notable works: "Punks, Bulldaggers, and Welfare Queens: The Radical Potential of Queer Politics" (1997), The Boundaries of Blackness: AIDS and the Breakdown of Black Politics (1999), Democracy Remixed: Black Youth and the Future of American Politics (2010)

Cathy J. Cohen (born 1962) is an American political scientist, author, feminist, and social activist, whose work has focused on the African-American experience in politics from a perspective which is underlined by intersectionality. She is currently the David and Mary Winton Green Professor in Political Science and the College at the University of Chicago, and is the former Director of the Center for the Study of Race (2002–05).

== Early life and education ==
Cohen was raised in a Black working-class family in Toledo, Ohio. She received her BA from Miami University, Ph.D. from the University of Michigan in 1993 and began her academic career at Yale University where she received tenure. Cohen joined the faculty of the University of Chicago in 2002.

== Career and impact ==
Cohen frequently writes and speaks about gender, sexuality, class, ethnicity, and their interrelatedness and connection to power. This approach puts her in a class of leftist intellectuals who work to have social and public policy influence on the lives of marginalized groups in a positive way. Cohen, a black lesbian and parent, is the principal researcher on the Black Youth Project, a nationwide survey which focuses on factors that influence black youth decision-making, norms, etc., and has a central focus on understanding how black youth feel political challenges significantly impact them. Cohen is the author of Democracy Remixed: Black Youth and The Future of American Politics and Boundaries of Blackness: AIDS and the Breakdown of Black Politics and Punks, Bulldaggers, and Welfare Queens: The Radical Potential of Queer Politics?. Cohen is also the co-editor of Women Transforming Politics: An Alternative Reader with Kathleen Jones and Joan Tronto and the co-author of a study on New Media and Youth Political Action, which is part of the Youth and Participatory Politics survey project. She was also on the board of Kitchen Table: Women of Color Press as well as the Center for Lesbian and Gay Studies (CLAGS) at CUNY.

Her book Boundaries of Blackness: AIDS and the Breakdown of Black Politics explores how issues such as age, gender, sexuality and the growing AIDS epidemic shape the acceptance boundaries within the African-American community.

In Democracy Remixed: Black Youth and The Future of American Politics, Cohen uses findings from the Black Youth Project to provide a detailed description of what black youth want, how they understand intersecting challenges of opportunity and discrimination, and how we can begin to help transform the lived experiences and future outcomes of African American youth.

Cohen is one of the founding board members of the Audre Lorde Project, which focuses on providing adequate representation, community wellness, and efficient economic and social justice for the LGBT+ communities they serve. Cohen is active in a number of organizations working on social justice issues; she has moderated the Applied Research Center's 2010 conference "Popularizing Racial Justice", and served as secretary of the American Political Science Association. Cohen has also been member of the Black Radical Congress, African American Women in Defense of Ourselves, and the United Coalition Against Racism. She currently serves as a board member of the Arcus Foundation and of the University of Chicago’s four charter schools.

== Notable works ==
=== “Punks, Bulldaggers, and Welfare Queens: The Radical Potential of Queer Politics?” (1997) ===
In “Punks, Bulldaggers, and Welfare Queens: The Radical Potential of Queer Politics”, Cohen brings attention to and problematizes queer theory’s single-oppression framework. She argues that this single-oppression framework reinforces the binary between queer/non-queer, creating a category to identify with instead of strategically challenging heteronormativity. By heteronormativity, Cohen is referring to the practices and institutions that legitimize and privilege heterosexuality and heterosexual relationships presumed to be “natural” in society. Heteronormativity is the normalizing power that is at the focus of queer politics.

Because “queer” is taken up in public discourse as a “deviant sexuality” and is indicative of non-normativity, Cohen argues that queer theory fails to advocate and recognize those who are not queer-identified as sexually marginalized subjects, which in turn, limits the radical potential of queer politics. She suggests that we broaden our understanding of queerness, because as it currently stands, the term “queer” does not encompass all marginalized identities. She urges that we must recognize the intersections of oppression and understand how multiple identities work to limit the privilege granted to those who conform to heteronormativity. This article is a call for action for queer activism to take an intersectional approach towards transformation.

=== “The Radical Potential of Queer? Twenty Years Later” (2019) ===
In “The Radical Potential of Queer? Twenty Years Later”, Cohen reflected on her article “Punks, Bulldaggers, and Welfare Queens” saying that it was shaped primarily by three factors: the HIV/AIDS crisis, neoliberal policies and ideologies implemented by Reagan and Clinton that harmed the poor, and hope, which stands in contrast to the first two (she is referring to the emergence of Black feminist and Black gay and lesbians communities between the 70s-90s). The article is primarily focused on hope, as Cohen is afraid of the erasure that happens with re-writing history, especially around Black and gay communities framed as only as response to HIV/AIDS. In fact, she argues that we need to remember that these communities were a radical attack on politics of respectability, and state violence.

Cohen articulates that “queer” and “queerness” have become politicized identities in and of themselves, which she is suggesting may rob it of the very potentials that queering is supposed to engender. In other words, queerness as a practice is about the ability to create an opposition to dominant norms—but to be queer is increasingly a “normal” identity. Thus, it may be weakening as a position of resistance, because it has become part of a range of identities, which is a turn away from being a form of resistance to categorization and heteronormativity. Cohen concludes with a hopeful message that perhaps her vision of queer resistance isn't what she thought it would be twenty years ago, but recognizes the potential for contemporary Black feminism and queer activists to make radical change.

== Awards and honors ==
She has received a number of awards, including the Robert Wood Johnson Investigator’s Award, and the Robert Wood Johnson Scholars in Health Policy Research Fellowship.

Cohen is the recipient of two research grants from the Ford Foundation for her work as principal investigator of the Black Youth Project and the Mobilization, Change and Political and Civic Engagement Project. Cohen serves on a number of national and local advisory boards and is the co-editor with Frederick Harris of a book series at Oxford University Press entitled "Transgressing Boundaries: Studies in Black Politics and Black Communities".

In 2004, Cohen was awarded the Race, Politics, and Adolescent Health: Understanding the Health Attitudes and Behaviors of African American Youth Award. In 2004, Cohen was also interviewed for the Global Feminisms Project Comparative Case Studies Of Women's Activism and Scholarships, which is an archive of oral histories given by transnational women scholars and activists.

In 2012, Cohen received the Quantrell Award.

In 2013, Cohen gave the Martin Luther King Jr. Memorial Lecture, entitled "Dr. Martin Luther King Jr. in the Age of Obama: Building a New Movement for the 21st Century", at Gustavus Adolphus College.

== See also ==
- Race and health
- Audre Lorde Project, an LGBTSTGNC organization for people of color in New York City, named for Audre Lorde
- Teaching for social justice
- Black Feminism
- Womanism
- Critical social theory
- Cultural Studies
- bell hooks
- LGBT and multiculturalism
