= Black Radical Congress =

- Formation: 1998; 28 years ago
- Region served: United States

The Black Radical Congress (BRC) is an organization founded in 1998 in Chicago. It is a grassroots network of individuals and organizations of African descent focused on advocating for broad progressive social justice, racial equality and economic justice goals within the United States.

== History ==
At the organizing congress in Chicago in June 1998, 2,000 people participated in creating the organization. However, their first mission predates the organizing congress, having been publicly endorsed and published by a number of high-profile black scholars and activists on 16 March 1998.

On 17 April 1999, the BRC ratified a "freedom agenda" listing 15 objectives dealing with racial and economic justice in the United States. The National Council of the BRC adopted a mission statement on 26 September 1999 in East St. Louis, Illinois. The opening paragraph states:

The purpose of the Black Radical Congress (BRC) is to promote dialogue among African American activists and scholars on the left; to discuss critical issues on the national and international scene that pertain to the Black community; to explore new strategies and directions for progressive political, social and cultural movements; and to renew the Black radical movement through increased unified action.

The complete mission statement discusses approaches to radical democratic methods involving conferences, forums and publications. "Principles of unity" were also adopted, stating that the BRC was established as a "center without walls" focusing on "transformative politics that focuses on the conditions of Black working and poor people."

A national organizing conference was convened in Detroit in 2000, and other conferences have taken place in subsequent years.

== Organization ==
The BRC has both individual and organizational memberships. It is headed by a National Congress.

Each year, the BRC chooses a different "theme" to focus its work on; past themes have included anti-militarism and the prison-industrial complex.

The BRC has at least two caucuses, subgroups within the organization, the labor and working-class caucus and the Pat Parker Queer Caucus.

The BRC has local chapters in Washington, D.C.; the San Francisco Bay Area; Sacramento, California; Minneapolis; St. Louis; New York City; Raleigh, North Carolina; Philadelphia and Pittsburgh.

== Principles ==
=== Race and racial justice ===
The BRC states: "Black is not necessarily a color or hue, but encompasses all peoples of African descent." Their work is focused on racial justice as well as broader social and economic justice as it intersects with the politics of race and racial oppression.

=== Radical politics ===
"Radical means getting to the root causes of society's injustices and working for root-level, fundamental change. Radicalism is an honored tradition in Black political history."

The BRC has many ties to the Communist Party USA, although the Congress does not explicitly identify itself as communist, socialist or Marxist.

== Endorsers ==
A number of high-profile black scholars and activists endorsed the creation of the BRC on 16 March 1998:

- Marlene Archer (National Co-chair, National Conference of Black Lawyers)
- Amina Baraka (Communist Party USA)
- Amiri Baraka (Unity & Struggle newspaper)
- Debbie Bell (Communist Party USA)
- Angela Y. Davis (Professor, University of California, Santa Cruz)
- Johanna Fernandez (International Socialist Organization)
- Bill Fletcher, Jr. (Labor activist and writer, Washington, D.C., Democratic Socialists of America)
- Lewis Gordon (Temple University)
- Robin D. G. Kelley (University of Southern California)
- Marian Kramer (National Welfare Rights Union)
- Julianne Malveaux
- Manning Marable
- Barbara Ransby, African American Women in Defense of Ourselves (1991 New York Times Ad), writer and historian
- Sonia Sanchez (poet)
- Joe Sims (Communist Party, USA)
- Yicki Smith (Feminist Action Network)
- Jarvis Tyner (Communist Party, USA)
- Cornel West (Democratic Socialists of America)

== See also ==
- Black Lives Matter
- Nation of Islam
