= Communist Labor Party of North America =

Communist Labor Party of the United States of North America
- Abbreviation: CLP
- Leader: Nelson Peery
- Founded: 1974
- Dissolved: 1993
- Preceded by: California Communist League (CL); League of Revolutionary Black Workers
- Succeeded by: National Organizing Committee
- Newspaper: Peoples Tribune/Tribuno del Pueblo,
- Ideology: New Communist Movement; Marxism-Leninism; Anti-revisionism

The Communist Labor Party of the United States of North America (CLP or CLP(USNA)) was an anti-revisionist communist party that was part of the New Communist movement in the United States.

The CLP was founded in 1974 and disbanded in 1993. The League of Revolutionaries for a New America was then founded by CLP members.

During its lifetime, the CLP was frequently critical of the US Communist Party and the Soviet Union and refused to become closely aligned with other foreign communist parties. Established as a traditional industrial union party, the CLP began to reexamine its focus as the industrial workforce in the United States started declining in the 1980s. By 1993, CLP members had decided that the party could no longer grow in its present form and decided to disband it.

== History ==
=== Communist League ===
In 1958, the Provisional Organizing Committee to Reconstitute a Marxist–Leninist Party (POC) split from the Communist Party of the United States. In 1968, Nelson Peery and his wife, Sue Ying Peery, led a small group out of the POC and formed the California Communist League (CL).. In California, several Mexican American groupings joined the CL. A group of African American autoworkers in Michigan, from the League of Revolutionary Black Workers merged into the CL.

The CL organized forums with different left groups and individuals to develop a new communist party. These forums were held in several cities around the United States . Due its policy of advancing into leadership women, national minorities and workers, the CL had a leadership grouping different from other groups on the left.

=== CLP formation ===
In September 1974, CL members founded the CLP at a Congress in Chicago, Illinois. The newspaper of the CL, the Peoples Tribune/Tribuno del Pueblo, became the newspaper of the CLP. The CL's theoretical journal, Proletariat, was also continued by the CLP. In addition, the Western Worker, published by the CL was continued by the CLP. Nelson Peery was appointed leader

In the "Documents of the First (Founding) Congress of the CLP(USNA), the preamble to the Party Program stated

"Basing ourselves on the ‘Communist Manifesto’ and the ‘Program of the Communist International,’ the Marxist-Leninists of the USNA set out to rally the revolutionary working class around the following program.” In the program is the germ of the future analysis of the Party: "The trend toward shifting the economic base from mechanics to electronics has not only increased the reserve army of unemployed but also created a huge qualitatively new army of permanently unemployed, especially amongst national minority proletarians.”

=== Member requirements ===
The CLP required all members to study Marxist theoretical writings at weekly study sessions. Many members attended "cadre schools” which lasted for eight weeks, studying the Marxist classics full-time, six days a week.

One of the CLP's fundamental positions was independence for the so-called "Negro Nation". They defined the Negro Nation as all people living in the Southern United States, including both African Americans and whites. The argument was that all those living within the boundaries of a nation were members of that nation.

=== Ethiopian relationship ===
In 1974 a military-led revolution installed a new regime in Ethiopia. For several years the CLP maintained relations with Ethiopian political activists and wrote reports and articles on developments in Ethiopia and Africa.

The Soviet Union supported the new Ethiopian government. However, the CLP was critical of Soviet policies. Given the close relationship between the Ethiopian government and the Soviet Union, the CLP position in Ethiopia was quite precarious. Eventually the CLP had to leave and return to the US.

=== 2nd Congress (1975) ===
The CLP held its 2nd Congress in November 1975.

The Political Resolution at this Congress stated, "The struggle within the socialist camp is increasingly taking a national form – a form that makes ever more difficult the militant expressions of solidarity of the revolutionary proletariat within the socialist sector.” And, "Our Party … does not choose national sides in this ... struggle that is taking place within the socialist camp. Our Party unconditionally supports revolution and conditionally supports states.”

This Political Resolution also discussed globalization, with the CLP viewing it as a the consolidation of an international bourgeoisie.

Just before the 3rd Congress, ten members left the CLP. Called the "action faction,” this faction wanted the CLP to become more active in and "build the movement.” The CLP position was that the time was not right for direct action. Instead, the CLP needed to spend more time building class consciousness.. Tension between these two perspectives continued throughout the life of the CLP.

=== 3rd Congress (1980) ===
The third congress of the CLP was held in November 1980.

The Political Resolution stated that "The tremendous production which was made possible because of World War II had become a tremendous overproduction.” The Resolution also stated that "The emphasis in the international class struggle is shifting from the national colonial struggle to the open collision of classes.” The CLP was focusing on what it termed class warfare in the United States as national liberation in other nations..

=== 1980s ===
In March 1981, the CLP published the first issue of Rally, Comrades! as the "official organ of the Central Committee of the Communist Labor Party.” Its purpose was to "rally the ideological leaders of the workers in order to rally the workers for the final conflict.” Rally, Comrades! was circulated internationally.

During the early 1980s, Rally, Comrades! published a series of articles analyzing and criticizing the political leaders of the Soviet Union. The Peoples Tribune and the Tribuno del Pueblo continued to be published by the CLP but spoke to a broader audience. All papers were bilingual (English and Spanish).

With the economic recessions of the 1980s the CLP became active in labor union struggles against contract concessions and in aiding undocumented workers and the homeless. The CLP also participated in the mayoral campaigns of Harold Washington in Chicago and the Jesse Jackson run for the 1988 presidential election.

=== 4th Congress (1986) ===
The Political Report to the Fourth Congress (Nov. 1986) stated "For the first time there is a possibility of building a truly revolutionary party on the basis of the objective communist movement. That movement is nothing less than the galvanizing struggles of 50 million dispossessed, hungry, homeless and unemployed—the most oppressed and exploited workers. This must be the firm foundation of our Party.” Here the CLP begins to clearly move away from the 3rd International conception of the industrial workers as the foundation of the communist party. With the application of electronics to the productive process, which accelerated in the 1970s and 80s, the industrial workers began to disappear from the workforce. Many left groups moved to base themselves in whatever unions remained, in spite of the fact that both public and private sector unions were radically declining in membership. The CLP began to seriously grapple with the transformation that was occurring within the working class.

In the pamphlet, "Documents of the Fourth Congress,” the article "Explanation of the Party Program” quotes an 1890 letter written by Engels: "It is far more important that the movement should spread, proceed harmoniously, take root and embrace as much as possible the whole American proletariat than that it should start and proceed, from the beginning, on theoretically perfectly correct lines. There is no better road to theoretical clearness of comprehension than to learn by one’s own mistakes. And for a whole large class, there is no other road, especially for a nation so eminently practical and so contemptuous of theory as the Americans. The great thing is to get the working class to move as a class.”

The Program of the Fourth Congress states, "We agitate to politically shake up the proletariat. The aim of our agitation is to draw the maximum number of workers into the political struggle. Communist propaganda is scientific, theoretical, political education. Our propaganda exposes capitalist production relations as the root cause of the social destruction rampant today. The class struggle is a political struggle; our propaganda convinces the workers that society cannot be organized to meet their basic demands without their seizing political power.”

The Political Report to the Fourth Congress also sharply criticized the politics of the Communist Party (USA) focusing on the CP's advocacy of left-center unity. "For the CPUSA the most important goal is ‘unity of the working class in the battle against the corporations.’ By disregarding that imperialism objectively has split the working class—a phenomenon which Lenin identified over 75 years ago—the CPUSA proclaims the lofty goal of uniting the working class. Towards this end it sacrifices all, including the interests of the most revolutionary sections of the working class.” Here the CLP is referring to Lenin’s statement that the super-profits from the exploitation of the colonial peoples are used to bribe a sector of the working class in the imperialist country and turn this sector into an ally of the ruling class against the non-bribed sector of the working class. And further, "... the increasing economic crisis has forced the so-called "center” to the right and with it the CPUSA has moved to the right as well.”

=== 5th Congress (1991) ===
The most important document published by the CLP was a 30 page pamphlet entitled, "Entering an Epoch of Social Revolution.” It was written by Nelson Peery. However, it went through several revisions after discussions and comments from CLP members. It was first published in June 1989. The final version was published in April 1991, retaining the title, "Entering an Epoch of Social Revolution,” and issued as the "Political Report to the Fifth Congress of the Communist Labor Party.”

In the pamphlet, the CLP stated that "Today—because the economic revolution is throwing workers out of the productive process—this struggle tends not to be between worker and employer. It is between workers and various elements of the state: the police, welfare offices, federal agencies, school boards or public hospital bureaucracies.”

The "Epoch” pamphlet also pointed out the fundamental problems in the Soviet Union. "

=== International Conference (1990) ===
"In November, 1990, CLP representatives met in London with the Communist Party of Great Britain and the Communist Party of Turkey . They agreed to publish an Information Bulletin and to actively seek out other parties to participate in this exchange of information.” (from Rally, Comrades! January 1991)

The group issued a statement after the meeting which noted, "Today we are entering a qualitatively higher stage in the epoch of social revolution based on profound changes in the productive forces. The delegates discussed the main characteristics of these developments. These included the general aspects of the period of counter-revolution and reaction caused by the collapse of the world socialist system and the disintegration of the world communist movement. These are direct consequences of developments in the Soviet Union, not least its inability to cope with the continuing revolutionization of the productive forces.”

One issue of an "International Information Bulletin” was published by the group before the CLP withdrew over political differences and the group disbanded.

=== 6th Congress – CLP disbands (1993) ===
On January 31, 1993, at the Sixth Congress, the CLP voted unanimously to disband. This proposal was thoroughly discussed leading up to the 6th Congress. While many members initially had serious questions about the move to disband, they were eventually won over.

One of the main arguments was that the CLP had failed to recruit new people and grow. Members believed that the organizational form of the CLP was not conducive to the further development of the revolutionary process.

The "Call for the 6th Party Congress” (Rally, Comrades! Nov. 1992) raised the question, "What is the proper organizational form for revolutionaries in this quantitative stage of the revolution?” The Call states, "… this is not a time of preparation for the seizure of power. This is the moment to organize and politicize the social revolution. This is a time to struggle for the unity and political clarity of the millions who are in the diverse and daily struggle for jobs, health care and the other necessities of their lives.

=== National Organizing Committee/League of Revolutionaries for a New America (1993) ===
In the January 1993 issue of Rally, Comrades! "An Open Letter” calling for a new organization was signed by Marian Kramer, President of the National Welfare Rights Union and General Baker, a UAW member and founder of the League of Revolutionary Black Workers. In the same issue of the paper a "Call to form Organizing Committees to establish an organization to educate, organize, and finally lead the masses in the inevitable transformation of our society” was published. It was signed by five activists: Abdul Alkalimat, Nacho Gonzalez, Ethel Long-Scott, John Slaughter and Leona Smith. Also in that issue was a statement by the CLP supporting the Call.

The new organization was initially called the National Organizing Committee and later became the League of Revolutionaries for a New America.

== See also ==
- List of anti-revisionist groups

== Sources ==
- Dan Georgakas and Marvin Surkin (1998). Detroit: I Do Mind Dying. Haymarket Books, Chicago, IL ISBN 978-1-60846-221-6
- Max Elbaum (2002). Revolution in the Air. Verso, London, England ISBN 1-85984-617-3
