= Black Socialists in America =

Political organization in the United States

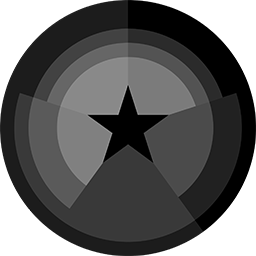
- Founded: April 2018; 8 years ago
- Dissolved: June 2024; 1 year ago
- Ideology: Anti-capitalism; Anti-racism; Anti-imperialism; Democratic socialism Libertarian socialism Internationalism; Intercommunalism; Direct democracy Eco-socialism; Social ecology Intersectionality
- Colors: Black

Website
- blacksocialists.us

Black Socialists in America (Note: Formerly known as Black Socialists of America) (BSA) was an American political organization whose stated goal was to create a national platform and network for those who identify as Black American Socialists.

From its foundation, the group worked on grassroots initiatives with organizations across the country, received national media coverage, and an endorsement from Noam Chomsky.

The group also hosted a number of public panels and online discussions featuring Black organizers from both the civil rights and Black power eras such as Jamal Joseph and Lorenzo Kom'boa Ervin, as well as political organizations like Kongra Star.

== Software development ==
Black Socialists in America raised funds to develop software that has not yet been finalized as of 2023: $25,616.18 for a social organizing platform called the "Dual Power App," $1,738.43 for a democratic meeting application called "Stack," and $10,798.40 for an informational application based upon their own website. The Dual Power App and Stack were designed and developed open source through a spinoff organization, Open Tech Development (OTD), which, as of December 2023, is in hibernation. The projects, which were explored through a public design and development process that utilized feedback from local organizers and followers of the organization, are also suspended indefinitely as of 2023. The Dual Power App X account last tweeted on December 19, 2023.

== See also ==
- African-American leftism
- African-American socialism
- American Left
- Black Panther Party
- Labor history of the United States
