= Darnell Stephen Summers =

American political activist falsely accused of murder

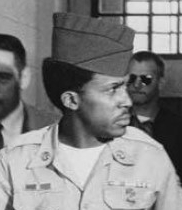
- Born: July 9, 1947 (age 79); Detroit, Michigan, U.S.
- Citizenship: United States of America (birthplace)
- Education: Blessed Sacrament Catholic School
- Occupations: Musician, Film Director, Actor, Media Editor, Composer, Cameraman, Producer and Sound Technician
- Known for: Same murder charge dismissed twice
- Notable work: Afrodisia jazz album, Street of Dreams 'Harrison Avenue' film, and The OTHER American(s) film
- Movement: Black Workers Congress, Vietnam Veterans Against The War / Vietnam Veterans Against The War (Anti-Imperialist), charter member of the Malcolm X Cultural Center (Inkster Michigan), Just Say No, and Stop The War Brigade
- Criminal charge: Murder
- Criminal penalty: None
- Criminal status: Under investigation for 58 years
- Children: 4
- Military Career
- Branch: United States Army
- Rank: Specialist 4
- Conflicts: Vietnam War
- Website: www.facebook.com/KeepDarnellFree

Darnell Stephen Summers is a long time left-wing political activist and U.S. Army veteran of the Vietnam War who has been facing charges of murdering a police officer for 58 years. The case has been dismissed twice, first in 1969 and then again in 1984 due to a lack of evidence and recanted testimonies, with the second judge saying there was "no factual, legal, or ethical justification for proceeding with this case." Despite no conviction and no new evidence, Michigan State Police continue to consider him a suspect. As recently as October 2020, police stopped him in Michigan to collect DNA samples and seize his phone. Summers and his supporters argue the ongoing case is a form of political harassment. With potential charges still hanging over him, Summers has been residing in Germany since 1972 where he has been married twice and has four children. He is a musician, filmmaker and journalist who has created a jazz album and several documentary films.

== Background ==
Summers was born to a black, middle class family in Inkster, Michigan on July 9, 1947. His parents moved there from Louisiana in the early 1940s because, as Summers described it, his mother "did not want her children to grow up in the Jim Crow segregated south." His father was a steelworker and his mother took care of their home and children. He attended Blessed Scarcement Elementary and then graduated from St. Francis Xavier High School in 1965. The next year he joined the Army. He has told interviewers that he wasn't super patriotic, mainly enlisting because he had split with his girlfriend and had "a broken heart." While in the Army, he received orders to Vietnam in August 1968, but went home on leave prior to shipping out. This is where major events took place that changed his life.

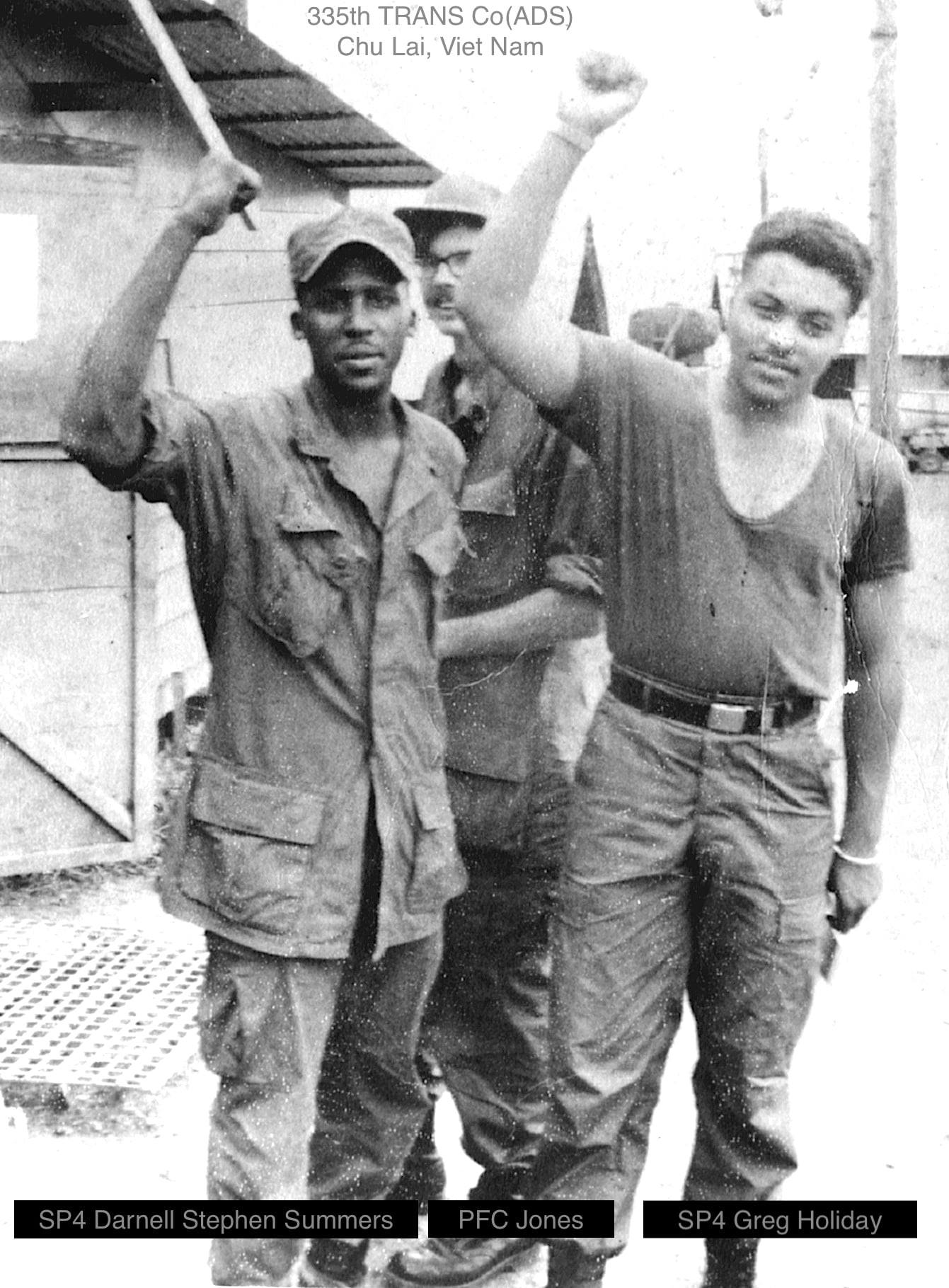
Darnell Summers (on left) in Chu Lai Vietnam in 1968

== Activism and Arrest ==
During his leave he became involved with other Black youth in Inkster working to build a cultural center. City leaders had given the youths permission to run the center in a city-owned recreation building, but became angered when they named it after the late Malcolm X. Within days, the youths reported to the Detroit Free Press that police had "vandalized" the center and removed pictures of Malcolm X, H. Rap Brown, Stokely Carmichael and the Black Panthers. During the ensuing days there were several clashes between Black youth and the police. By the time things settled down, two policemen had received minor wounds from a shotgun blast near the recreation center, one policeman had been killed by unknown assailants, a civilian had been shot in the shoulder by police, and a 14 year old Black boy had been shot in the back and killed by the police for having "'something' in his hands (it was his shirt)." Shortly after this, Summers returned to duty and was shipped to Vietnam.

While in Vietnam, Summers was horrified by what he witnessed of the U.S. Army's treatment of the Vietnamese people. He described it as "tantamount to the treatment that Black people were receiving in America." One soldier in his company kept some souvenir fingers he had cut off a Vietnamese, and Summers witnessed two soldiers in his company "just arbitrarily kill a man who was tending his fields." Summers turned the two soldiers in and testified against them.

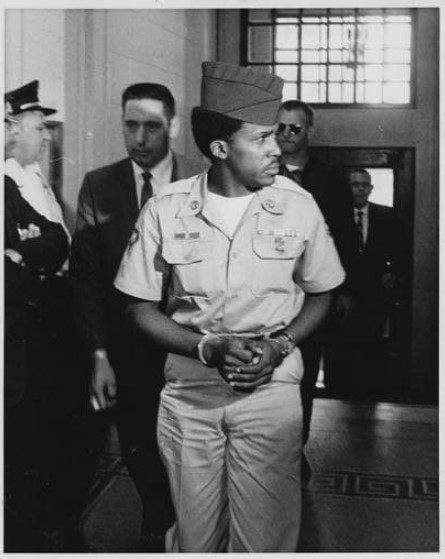
Darnell Summers at the Wayne County Court House in late 1968 or early 1969

In early December 1968 Summers was brought back from Vietnam "to face charges of attempted murder" of the two Michigan State patrolmen who had been injured. He was flown to San Francisco where the U.S. Army turned him over to the Inkster and Michigan State Police for transport to Detroit. He was then placed in the Wayne County Jail and held on a $20,000 bond. Once in court, however, the attempted murder charge against Summers was thrown out. The Detroit Free Press reported the prosecution's case "came apart" as their "star witness" was unable to provide convincing evidence after "more than three hours of intensive cross-examination". Charges were then reduced to "assault" and "attempt to damage police property." In June 1969, Summers plead guilty to "conspiracy to commit felonious assault" against the two policemen, "neither of whom was seriously hurt." He was sentenced to one and one-half to four years in prison, but was released after thirteen months.

== Murder Charges Dismissed Twice ==
Meanwhile, he had been charged with the murder of the policeman who had been killed on the night of unrest back in August 1968. This was the case mentioned above that has been thrown out twice with the second judge saying there was "no factual, legal, or ethical justification for proceeding with this case." It is also the case that has been held over him for 58 years. The first time Summers was tried for this murder, the main witness for the prosecution testified he had been in a car with Summers and seen him shoot at the unmarked police vehicle containing the detective who was killed. But, the witness had also written a letter the previous month stating he "was not in the car" with Summers that night. On September 4, 1969, the judge, citing the "conflicting statements", dismissed the charges against Summers for the first time.

In July 1982, almost 14 years after the murder, Summers was extradited from West Germany to Detroit "to once again face charges" that he was involved. He was arrested by the German police who cooperated with the Michigan police. The case quickly became a political issue as several "local and some international leftist political organizations" claimed he was a "victim of political oppression." The groups cited his progressive jazz band, his writings in "left-wing publications and his support of the Rock Haus in Worms, West Germany". Summers agreed, calling himself "a revolutionary" who has organized "black American GIs against the Vietnam War, aided expatriate Turkish workers, [defended] the Iranian revolutionaries who had seized the U.S. Embassy in Tehran and performed regularly in 'progressive' music events."

Almost immediately after his extradition the prosecution's case began to unravel as its "chief witness" said she had been "pressured into signing 'totally fabricated' statements linking him to the 1968" killing. She explained at a press conference that the police had "threatened to 'keep me in jail for a long time'" if she didn't testify. By the time Summers' trial was set to start in late July, the local press was voicing skepticism about the case—"The first-degree murder case against Darnell Summers now rests on the testimony of a convicted killer whose previous versions of the slaying have been as changeable as the weather." This witness was none other than the same witness the prosecution had used in Summers first trial, the one who contradicted his own testimony. The prosecutor himself admitted "his case was weak", explaining "I was just assigned this case. My job is to present the evidence I have and let the jury decide."

Even with the obvious weaknesses in the case, the prosecution delayed for two more years before finally dropping the charges for the second time in February 1984. The prosecutor described their main witness as "a person whose credibility, quite realistically, requires great scrutiny" and conceded that they "simply do not have a winnable case." Summers summed it up as being a victory but called it "an outrage that they still might be able to bring this again." He called the trials a "railroad" and complained that "they had me under surveillance for 15 years". "I've been followed, my mailbox gone through and my phone tapped." He told the press he was convinced the authorities had surveillance showing "I did not have anything to do with it (the murder.)" The prosecutor responded that "any talk of an international political conspiracy against Summers was unfounded."

== Fort Carson Racial Harmony Council ==
Before Summers was discharged from the Army, after he had served thirteen months in civilian prison, he was sent to Fort Carson in Colorado with the 517th Medical Company to complete his enlistment. He hadn't violated any Army regulations, and the Army wasn't sure what to do with him, but after a retention hearing where he presented "letters from the Inkster mayor and police chief and from his battalion commander in Vietnam", they decided to reinstate him "with both rank and secret-level security clearance intact." At Fort Carson, Summers was soon involved in the Racial Harmony Council and quickly elected as its chair. He spent "his last months in the army working for racial justice." Things did not always go smoothly and "on several occasions unit commanders had him arrested for haircut violations or 'anything else they could come up with.'" Overall, he spent four years in the Army and was honorably discharged on December 10, 1970.

== Artistic and Political Activity ==
Summers started playing piano at a young age and has been in several bands during his lifetime. In Germany he was the lead singer in a rock band called Last Exit from around 1972 to 1973. While he was back in the U.S. from 1973 to 1977, he was briefly in a band called the Other Side. Once back in Germany in 1977 he was a founding member and leader of the jazz band Afrodisia, which included his brother, the jazz percussionist Bill Summers. They started playing in a well known Frankfurt night club Sinkkasten and then became regulars at Cave 54 in Heidelberg. For a while they toured in Switzerland, playing in nightclubs, at festivals and appearing on Swiss television. They released one album, "Elephant Sunrise", in 1980 on Comma Records which was re-released in 2018 by Cordial Recordings.

In the early 1980s Summers and several other members of Afrodisia formed the "Just Say No" posse with several anti-war U.S. soldiers who were stationed in Germany. They helped build resistance within the U.S. armed forces to the U.S. military presence around the world. Summers then helped to form the "Stop The War Brigade" in Germany which campaigned against both the Gulf War from 1990 to 1991 and the U.S. invasion of Iraq in 2003. He was even quoted in the official military newspaper Stars and Stripes in 2003 shouting "George Bush, we know you. Your daddy was a killer, too" at a demonstration in Heidelberg against the pending war with Iraq. He has filmed and produced several documentary films, including "Street of Dreams 'Harrison Avenue'" in 1993, and "The OTHER American(s)" in 2008. In 2005 he appeared in the film Sir! No Sir!, a documentary about the antiwar and resistance movement within the ranks of the U.S. Armed Forces during the Vietnam War. He talked about the dap, a special handshake used by Black GIs and the role played by GI underground newspapers inside the military.
