= Flavia Agnes =

Indian women's rights activist and lawyer

- Born: Mumbai, India
- Occupations: Lawyer, activist, author, lecturer
- Website: www.majlislaw.com

Flavia Agnes is an Indian women's rights lawyer with expertise in marital, divorce, and property law. She has published articles in the journals Subaltern Studies, Economic and Political Weekly, and Manushi. She writes on themes of minorities and law, gender and law, law in the context of women's movements, and on issues of domestic violence, feminist jurisprudence, and minority rights. She is also a lecturer.

== Early life ==
Flavia Agnes was born in 1947 in Mangalore, Karnataka, where she lived with her maternal aunt and two older siblings. Her parents lived in Aden, Aden Colony with her three younger sisters. She studied in a Kannada-medium school until the 10th grade. On the eve of her Secondary School Certificate (SSC) exams, her aunt died in her sleep and Agnes went to Aden, where she joined her parents. Following her father's death, she took up a job as a typist in a post office to help support her family. She returned to Mangalore with her mother and sisters when she was 20.

== Personal life ==
Soon after they returned to India, her mother urged her to have an arranged marriage. Her marriage was a "wreck" and she was mentally and physically abused. In 1980, Agnes became involved with a women's movement in Mumbai and with the support of the women in the group, she ended her marriage after 13 years. As a Christian, Agnes was not entitled to "divorce on the grounds of cruelty" under the Christian Marriage Act and had to ask for a judicial separation.

Agnes had three children with her husband, and following her divorce, she took custody of her two daughters and sent them to a boarding school. She sold her jewellery to buy a small house in Borivali, Mumbai. The church provided an outlet for Agnes to become an activist. She became inspired by church lecturers and external speakers, particularly one entitled: "Christ the Radical" that covered the anti-rape movement. This event in particular led to Agnes joining the Forum against Oppression of Women

== Education ==
Prior to her marriage, Agnes had only completed her SSC exams. Agnes' greater involvement in the women's movement led her to study further to obtain meaningful employment, live independently and secure custody of her children. As a result, Agnes completed the Shreemati Nathibai Damodar Thackersey Women's University (SNDT) entrance exam and completed a Bachelor of Arts (BA) in Sociology with Distinction in 1980.

Agnes then completed an LLB in 1988 and began to practice law at the Mumbai High Court. She later completed her LLM from Mumbai University in 1992. She received an MPhil from National Law School of India University, Bangalore (NLSIU) in 1997. For her thesis, which was later published by Oxford University Press, she worked on law and gender equality, examining the politics of personal laws in different religious communities, particularly those affecting women.

== Career ==
=== Law ===
Agnes began working in the field of women in law in the 1980s, at the beginning of the second phase of the women's movement, and since 1988, Agnes has been a practicing lawyer at the Mumbai High Court. Her own experience with domestic violence inspired her to become a women's rights lawyer. She also advises the government on law implementation and currently advises the Ministry of Women and Child Development in Maharashtra.

As a lawyer, she is concerned with women's rights, particularly women's economic rights. Her goal is to solve women's inequality and impoverishment within the Indian economic structure, especially regarding property ownership. She acknowledges that some Hindu women were not allowed any property, and other women were allowed a small amount in the pre-colonial and civil time in India under the British law. Women eventually gained more independence before marriage, but not in the sense of property law.

=== Teaching ===
Subsequent to her M.Phil., Agnes became a guest faculty at NLSIU. She is also a member of the visiting faculty at National Academy of Legal Studies and Research, Hyderabad (NALSAR) and Jindal Global Law School. She has also taught in medical schools.

=== MAJLIS ===
Along with Madhushree Dutta, Agnes is the co-founder of MAJLIS, meaning 'association' in Arabic, "a legal and cultural resource centre." that campaigns for and provides legal representation for women on issues such as matrimonial rights and child custody. Since its inception in 1990, MAJLIS has provided legal services for 50,000 women.

== Recognition ==
In August 2018 Power Brands awarded Agnes the Bharatiya Manavata Vikas Puraskar for her work with marginalized and disenfranchised women and children, her contributions to feminist jurisprudence, human rights law and gender studies in India, and for the work of her organisation, Majlis.

On Saturday, February 10th, Agnes was awarded the 'Dr. Asghar Ali Engineer Lifetime Achievement Award' in Udaipur for her exceptional contributions.

== Views ==
=== Death penalty ===
While death in the Indian judiciary system is handed out in cases described as "rarest of rare", Agnes and her team of lawyers at MAJLIS have been prominent critics of the death penalty and oppose it for all cases. Sometimes their opposition has been controversial, as they opposed it for the accused in both the Nirbhaya case and the Shakti Mills case. Agnes talks of a class bias when it comes to convicting those accused of rape, and points out that as per the rules of Section 376E (which allows death penalty for cases of rape) the accused must be "unrepentant repeat offenders". In both the aforementioned cases, that was not the case and, according to Agnes, this type of judgement serves to "dilute" the 'rarest of rare' premise. Agnes is also against the concept that rape is worse than death or that a woman who is raped is a "zinda laash" (walking dead) pointing out that not only does this concept demean women but if rape is equated with murder, "more women will be killed after they are raped. Even worse, fewer women will report rape, particularly if it is committed by a near and dear one."

=== Sexual assault of men ===
Agnes has voiced opposition to making rape laws gender neutral, expounding that criminalizing rape of men "harm women more than men" and also said "we [women's groups] opposed it when they made child rape laws gender neutral."

== The Global Feminisms Project ==
Flavia Agnes is a part of the Global Feminisms Project, an archive created in 2002 to explore women scholars and activists around the world. The initial Project focused on four countries: China, India, Poland, and the United States, and was headed by the University of Michigan's Abigail Stewart, Jayati Lal, and Kristin McGuire. Three additional country sites (Nicaragua, Brazil and Russia) have been added. The project currently consists of seven countries and 79 interviews. The interviews are focused on the women's experiences and their feminist activism.
