= The South End =

Newspaper in Detroit, Michigan

- Type: Student newspaper
- Owner: Wayne State University
- Publisher: WSU Publication Board
- Editor: Jenna Prestininzi and Irving Mejia-Hilario
- Founded: 1967; 59 years ago
- Language: English
- Headquarters: 5221 Gullen Mall Student Center Building Suite 50; Detroit, MI 48202
- Circulation: 7,000 in print, 24,000 online
- Price: Free
- Website: thesouthend.wayne.edu

The South End is the official student newspaper of Wayne State University in Detroit, Michigan, published in print and online. It was founded in 1967, and its publication is funded partly from university funds and partly from advertising revenues. It is distributed free of charge.

The paper is published in print once a month during the fall and winter terms but produces an e-edition weekly and posts new online content daily. During the summer, The South End publishes content exclusively online, with the exception of its special editions: the Freshman Survival Guide, an informative publication for new students, and the Back to School issue, which is printed the first week of the fall semester. On the website, users can access The South End's previous editions in PDF format. The printed circulation is 8,000 and the online readership community is over 30,000. While the majority of contributing and staff writers for the paper are journalism majors, any Wayne State student may write articles for it.

== Sections of the paper ==
The South End primarily covers Wayne State's campus and Midtown Detroit. It has news, arts & entertainment, features, sports and multimedia sections.

Other features of The South End include columns, editorials, occasional cartoons and stories from The Associated Press News Wire. On its website, The South End offers up-to-date stories, photo galleries, videos, online polls and links to its weekly PDF issues.

=== News ===
In most cycles, the South End's news section operated under two news editors. While the majority of coverage centers on the WSU campus and Midtown neighborhood, the newspaper has also covered events in downtown Detroit, Corktown and Southwest Detroit. In recent years, The South End has covered a number of major events, including the 2011 protests outside Catherine Ferguson Academy after it was slated to close, the 2011 shooting death of WSU football player Cortez Smith and the beginnings of the Occupy Detroit movement.

=== Arts & Entertainment ===
The A&E section of The South End covers Detroit and WSU theaters, galleries, music/dance performances, concerts and fashion events. Movie reviews have become popular in the paper, as well as regular columns from writers.

=== Sports ===
The South End's sports section predominantly focuses on WSU teams, including men's baseball, basketball, cross country, fencing, football, golf, swimming/diving and tennis. Women's sports include basketball, cross country, fencing, softball, swimming/diving, tennis, track & field and volleyball. In 2011, The South End covered the WSU football team as it made its run at the NCAA Division II championship.

=== Features ===
After having lapsed for a couple of years, the features section is once again a regular part of The South End. The section covers profiles of businesses and people around campus, as well as general feature pieces on a variety of topics.

== History of the paper ==
Copies of The South End and its predecessors (from 1917 to present) are housed in the Wayne State University Archives at the Walter P. Reuther Library, 5401 Cass Avenue.

=== The 1960s ===
Before The South End, the paper was called The Daily Collegian. Prior to that, it was The Wayne Collegian and The Detroit Collegian. The last year of The Daily Collegian was Volume 57, while the first year of The South End was Volume 58, in 1967. William Rea Keast, the university president at the time, objected to the name, which was intended to reflect the newspaper office's location on the south end of the campus, a working-class area that was the focal point of leftist politics at the time. The logo of the paper then consisted of the name in lowercase over a drawing of a city skyline. In its first few years, The South End published a lot of poetry.

On September 26, 1968, when John Watson took over as editor-in-chief, the paper changed radically, both in design and in editorial policy. What had been a more or less ordinary student newspaper became a radical broadside, with a more casual approach to layout, spelling, and some would maintain, accuracy. A drawing of a small black panther facing to the right was added on both sides of the logo, which remained the same. From October 15 to the end of the year, the black panther on the right was flipped to face left, for symmetry. This symbolized the paper's ties with the Black Panthers and the League of Revolutionary Black Workers. The LRBW was an organization founded by Watson with other black radicals, including Ken Cockrel, that aimed to link the Dodge Revolutionary Union Movement (DRUM) and other auto plant Revolutionary Union Movements associated with the Panthers that were active in Southeast Michigan in the late 1960s and early 1970s. During this era, the newspaper also ran a standing quotation under its masthead stating, "One class-conscious worker is worth 100 students."

=== The 1980s ===
Twice during the late 1980s, left-leaning editors refused to run advertising from branches of the U.S. military. This resulted in at least one case in which the editor, Patricia Maceroni, was removed by the SNPB. She later resumed her editorship following a court challenge to the firing.

=== The 1990s ===
Much of the 1990s was spent upgrading the paper's notoriously lax standards with in-house style and grammar guides; adding strict editorial policies banning opinions from articles and a coherent editorial page featuring opinions from both sides of the political spectrum; and introducing the Associated Press wire to allow editors the use of AP stories in what was a steadily growing newspaper. Many of these standards fell by the wayside in subsequent years due to the high turnover in staff common at university newspapers.

In 1995, the newspaper won a gold medal from the College Newspaper Critique of Columbia University. In 1996, it featured exclusive interviews with the state's gubernatorial candidates and firsthand coverage of the national election. In 1998, The South End changed from a tabloid to a broadsheet format and added color pages. Weekday papers averaged 16–20 pages each, and special issues approached 72 pages. Distribution was extended as far as restaurants and bars downtown to the south and the New Center area to the north.

=== The 2000s ===
The 21st century brought considerable change to the paper, not all of it positive. Circulation of The South End spiked when guest columnist Joe Fisher wrote a controversial column entitled "Islam Sucks" in the February 26, 2002 issue. The column was mentioned by noted journalist Jack Lessenberry in his Metro Times column, saying that it should have been titled "Fundamentalist Islam sucks." The South End received so much mail about Fisher's column that they were printing letters for days, including letters from anti-defamation leagues.

Following the controversy, the paper often went in an ideologically opposite direction, reflecting its lack of a coherent editorial philosophy at the time. When a student group consisting mostly of Arab-American women got together on campus to protest the 2003 occupation of Iraq on April 13, 2004, the paper reported on the protest the next day with a distinctly slanted headline reading "Students Rally for Justice." On January 19, 2006, the paper also provided an objective report on one of the Five Pillars of Islam with a headline reading "Performing The Hajj." When the controversy over the Muhammad cartoons erupted later on, The South End consciously decided not to reprint the cartoons even though other student newspapers around the country did.

From 2003 to 2004, the circulation was highly unreliable and spotty when the task was entrusted to WSU's interoffice mail. It was during that school year that a gray line drawing of a tower of Old Main (a campus building) was added to the paper's name atop the front page.

In April 2004, the Conservative Union, a student group at Wayne State, started a biweekly newspaper, The Wayne Review without university funding to counter what they considered to be South End's radical left-wing bias with a conservative viewpoint. Wonetha Jackson, then editor-in-chief of The South End, wrote a column extending good wishes to the new paper. The Wayne Review often included a section called "The Back End," an obvious parody of The South End, on its last page. Wayne Review editors often wrote letters to The South End. In 2004, the Knight Ridder wire horoscope was occasionally replaced by the Warrior Spirit Horoscope, with predictions meant for WSU students made using features invented by Johannes Kepler.

For the April 1, 2005 issue, the paper ran a satire issue called The Rear End, which printed the date as "March 32, 2005" and ran fake news stories such as "WSU partiers conquer, reign," "Raisin mistaken for roach, student still catches buzz" and "Warriors Basketball awarded National Championship." The issue was code-named "Onion", after the satirical newspaper The Onion. For that issue, the paper had a color logo of a humorously anthropomorphic Old Main tower with its rear end exposed.

After that issue, the old gray line drawing was replaced by a color photo of the facade of Old Main with a blue sky, though the blue sky was removed after three issues. In summer 2005, the Fusion (science and technology) and Campus Life sections were cancelled to make more room for prepared full pages from the KRT wire service.

The paper did not recover from the usual summer advertising slump. As a consequence, the vast majority of issues of the Fall 2005 semester were six pages, with eight-page issues being the exception rather than the norm (compared to the fall 2004 semester, when most issues were eight to 10 pages, and sometimes even 12).

A major redesign of the surface details of the paper took place with the first issue of the winter 2006 semester. Justified paragraphs, a constant source of layout problems in the past, were discarded completely in favor of ragged right margins like the Detroit News uses in many of its sections. The picture of Old Main on the front page was removed, and the listing of the staff was moved to a less prominent position on the second page using a smaller font.

The June 15, 2006, issue marked a three-year record low number of pages, with just four. The May 7, 2007, issue showed another redesign of surface details, including the use of lowercase in the masthead.

In September 2007, the paper changed from a daily to a weekly, distributed on Wednesdays (the same day as the Metro Times and Real Detroit Weekly). The change from broadsheet to tabloid scheduled for October took place with the October 3-9 issue.

=== The 2010s ===
Starting in May 2013, The South End's budget was cut by nearly 50 percent. Although the newspaper continues to employ students as editors, it publishes in print only once per month, although a PDF version is published on its website weekly. In addition, the positions of multimedia and design editor were merged, one news editor position was terminated, and one copy editor position was transformed into that of online editor.

== Administration ==
The editor-in-chief is a student, usually an upperclassman, who is selected annually and traditionally enjoys some autonomy in staffing and editorial decision-making. The editor-in-chief appoints his or her own managing editor, section editors, copy editors, design editor and multimedia editor; choices must be approved by the university's Student Newspaper Publication Board.

This board consists of six student members appointed by the Student Senate and three members appointed by the university president. According to the SNPB charter, the administration's appointees include one working journalist, preferably an alumnus/a of the WSU journalism program, a faculty member from the Department of Communication, and a financial professional from the university's operations division. The advisor to the paper and the editor-in-chief serve in (non-voting) ex-officio capacity. The board is responsible for oversight of the paper, particularly its budget and major expenditures and contracts, and for selecting its editor each year. A board chair (and vice chair) are elected by the members from the student members. The university administration hired a full-time professional general manager for the paper in 2004 but decided to discontinue the service for FY 2008.

Currently, advertising is handled by a student ad manager in the Dean of Students Office.

== Online ==
The South End's website is run by TownNews.com and is updated daily with new content. Readers may subscribe to daily emails to receive news added to the website in the last 24 hours. The South End is also on Twitter and Facebook.
