= John Watson (activist) =

American activist (died 2001)

- Died: November 16, 2001 (aged 57)
- Resting place: Detroit Memorial Park East
- Children: 3

John Watson (died November 16, 2001) became editor of The South End, the daily student newspaper of Wayne State University, in 1968, transforming the paper into a public resource "with the intention of promoting the interests of impoverished, oppressed, exploited, and powerless victims of white, racist monopoly capitalism and imperialism" (first editorial by Watson in Sept. 26, 1968).

== Biography ==
Watson was born to Carol Ann Watson. In 1968 and 1969, Watson was editor of The South End, a daily student newspaper of Wayne State University. In 1969, Watson alongside Kenneth Cockrel Sr. and others founded the League of Revolutionary Black Workers. The group united the Dodge Revolutionary Union Movement and the RUMs at other plants. The group protested working conditions and racism within automotive companies and the United Auto Workers. As member of both the Black Panthers and the Detroit-based Dodge Revolutionary Union Movement (DRUM), John Watson represented the American black liberation movement at the international anti-imperialist conference organized in December 1968 in Italy. He helped produce Finally Got the News, a documentary on black workers in Detroit.

Watson married. He had at least three children, Christopher, Kendra and Nadja. He died of a heart attack on November 16, 2001, aged 57. He was buried in Detroit Memorial Park East.

== See also ==
- League of Revolutionary Black Workers
