= Elizabeth Viana =

Elizabeth Viana is an Afro-Brazilian sociologist and activist who was an active participant in the democratization process of Brazil. She was one of five students with feminist activist Lélia Gonzalez who founded the Group Lima Barreto, and was involved in the Nzinga Collective of Women and the Unified Black Movement (Movimento Negro Unificado). Her work prominently focuses on racial identity, academic and community activism, and reform of domestic and family roles. She currently lives in Vila Isabel, a middle-class neighborhood in the North Zone of Rio de Janeiro.

== Early life ==
Elizabeth Viana was born in Rio de Janeiro on December 4, 1954. Her father, Oswaldo Sadock (1927-2016), was a mechanical worker, and her mother, Espírito Santo Viana (1930-1978), produced and sold Bahian delicacies from home. Her parents married in Salvador, Bahia and moved to Rio de Janeiro to seek better living conditions. For a short period of time, the family stayed with Viana's godmother and paternal aunt, Perolina Costa Santos, and eventually settled in the Brazilian municipality Nilópolis in the southeastern region of Baixada Fluminense, where Viana began her activism during the Brazilian military government's authoritarian dictatorship that spanned from April 1964 to March 1985. Espírito died when Viana was 23 years old.

== Education ==
In 1979, Viana enrolled at the Institute of Philosophy and Social Sciences (UFRJ/IFCS) within the Federal University of Rio de Janeiro's department of Social Sciences. She received a Master's Degree in Comparative History and wrote her thesis entitled "Race relations, Gender, and Social Movements: The Thought of Lélia Gonzalez, 1970-1990" under the supervision of Professor Flávio dos Santos Gomes. Viana also received her postgraduate degree in 2006 from the State University of Rio de Janeiro-UERJ in Urban Sociology, supervised by Professor Myrian Sepulveda.

== Activism and Work ==
In the mid-1970s, Viana co-founded Black Action of Nilópolis (Ação Negra de Nilópolis), a group focused primarily on rebuking the myth of Brazilian racial democracy. During her time at the Federal University of Rio de Janeiro's Institute of Philosophy and Social Sciences, Viana became involved with a group of students protesting a professor's racist against two black students in class. After the class protests, Viana was elected to the nine-person representative student body at the Council of the Institute during its "political reopening." While in an academic setting, Viana founded the Group Lima Barreto with Lélia Gonzalez and four other students. While studying and working as an administrative assistant at Globex Utilidades, Viana simultaneously remained an active participant of Brazil's democratization and the development of grassroots women's movements. Gonzalez became a leader and mentor to Viana, helping her create the Nzinga Collective of Women in 1983, one of the first autonomous black women's organizations formed separately from the mainstream Brazilian women's movement and black movement in order to have black women's needs and interests be acknowledged. Viana was involved in the Unified Black Movement (Movimento Negro Unificado/MNU) that had a greater focus on class and racial oppression. From 1992-2004 she served as the Legislative Assistant at the Municipal Chamber of Rio de Janeiro, advising councilors Benedita da Silva and Jurema Batista.

== Recognition ==
Viana was interviewed with black feminist activist and history professor Giovana Xavier as two of thirteen Brazilian women featured in the Global Feminisms Project (GFP) from the University of Michigan. The interview, conducted by Sueann Caulfield in 2004, focuses on Viana and Xavier's involvement in the black movement, on issues related to women's rights and feminism, and the balance between intellectual work in academia and that within the activist movement.

A summary of the GFP Brazilian archives highlights Viana's work in the late 1970s and 1980s wave of social movements arising during the country's transition to democracy, concentrating on her role as a militant in Black neighborhood organizations and in anti-racist mobilization.

In Sueann Caulfield and Cristiana Schettini's scholarly article "Gender and Sexuality in Brazil since Independence," Viana's work in the Unified Black Movement is cited within a description of the Brazilian feminist movement's racial and class divides throughout the 1960s-70s.

== See also ==
- Global Feminisms Project
