= Global Feminisms Project =

The Global Feminisms Project, originated in 2002 and based at the Institute for Research on Women and Gender (IRWG) at the University of Michigan, is an oral history project led by a team of researchers at the University of Michigan that collects interviews of feminist activists representing seven countries including China, India, Poland, the United States, Brazil, Nicaragua, and Russia. The focus of the project is to record and archive the stories of females who are activists and scholars within the socio-historical context of their own countries, formed with curricular and research goals at its core. The sources provided lend themselves to comparative and interdisciplinary work, addressing issues that reach across disciplines and provide information regarding activism, historical context, identity formation, and social movements. The interviews are designed to explore the ways in which different forms of activism intersect at various, distinct time points within the history of the represented countries.

The project began with the integration of women's studies, an international perspective, and a focus on the activism within nations. The project emphasizes the relationship between women's activism and feminist scholarship and aims to represent transformations in feminism within each nation represented alongside the following parameters: conceptual, organizational, and social.

== Methodology ==
The interviewees were selected by each country site's team according to criteria they developed, which often emphasized including individuals who differ by generation, geography, and type of activism, among other things. In the interviews, the women were prompted to discuss their families and upbringing, educational and professional experiences, and activism and involvement in social movements; thus, the University of Michigan program leaders did not control the narrative created of feminism in each country. The interviews took place in the interviewees' home country using their native language, later translated into English.

Some notable interviewees include Ai Xiaoming, Flavia Agnes, Neera Desai, Dora María Téllez, Sofia Montenegro, Grace Lee Boggs, and Holly Hughes.

For a full list of interviewees from the Global Feminisms Project, see list below.

== Significance ==
The GFP created a collection of oral histories detailing the origins of feminist activists in several countries. The interviews have served as narrative examples of the feminist adage, "the political is personal." They also expand the understanding of the intersections of gender, nationality, race, and women's studies, political climates, and personal experiences.

The project has produced numerous resources that are publicly available including bibliographies, teaching modules, and the archive of video interviews. Additionally, the transcripts of all USA, Poland, Nicaragua, China, and India interviews in English have been entered into NVivo, a qualitative data analysis software, for individuals interested in using the interviews for research purposes.

== List of Interviewees ==
- Shahjehan Aapa (India)
- Rabab Abdulhadi (USA)
- Luciana Adriano da Silva (Brazil)
- Flavia Agnes (India)
- Xiaoming, Ai (China)
- Iara Amora Dos Santos (Brazil)
- Adrienne Asch (USA)
- Monica Baltodano (Nicaragua)
- Grace Lee Boggs (USA)
- Urvashi Butalia (India)
- Bertha Ines Cabrales (Nicaragua)
- Laura Castro (Brazil)
- Mingxia, Chen (China)
- Cathy Cohen (USA)
- Violeta Delgado (Nicaragua)
- Neera Desai (India)
- Ima Thokchom Ramani Devi (India)
- Mahasweta Devi (India)
- Jarjum Ete (India)
- Maria de Fatima Lima Santos (Brazil)
- Marilda de Souza Francisco (Brazil)
- Xiaoxian, Gao (China)
- Youli, Ge (China)
- Agnieszka Graff (Poland)
- Anna Gruszczynska (Poland)
- Zhonghua, He (China)
- Holly Hughes (USA)
- Elena Iarskaia-Smirnova (Russia)
- Inga Iwasiow (Poland)
- Juanita Jimenez (Nicaragua)
- Natalia Yurievna Kamenskaia (Russia)
- Yelena Viktorovna Kochkina (Russia)
- Maria Grigorievna Kotovskaia (Russia)
- Marian Kramer (USA)
- Barbara Labuda (Poland)
- Huiying, Li (China)
- Barbara Limanowska (Poland)
- Matilde Lindo (Nicaragua)
- Anna Lipowska-Teutsch (Poland)
- Bohong, Liu (China)
- Lata Pratibha Madhukar (India)
- Marina Mikhailovna Malisheva (Russia)
- Mangai (India)
- Diana Martinez (Nicaragua)
- Vina Mazumdar (India)
- Yamileth Mejia (Nicaragua)
- Maria Biktorovna Mikhailova (Russia)
- Sofia Montenegro (Nicaragua)
- Giordana Moreira (Brazil)
- Marianna Muravieva (Russia)
- Vilma Nunez (Nicaragua)
- Martha Ojeda (USA)
- Maria da Penha (Brazil)
- Angelica Souza Pinheiro (Brazil)
- Natalia Lvovna Pushkareva (Russia)
- Sandra Ramos (Nicaragua)
- Joanna Regulska (Poland)
- Natalia Mikailovna Rimashevskaia (Russia)
- Loretta Ross (USA)
- D. Sharifa (India)
- Lyubov Vasilyevna Shtyleva (Russia)
- Sista II Sista (USA)
- Andrea Lee Smith (USA)
- Malgorzatat Tarasiewicz (Poland)
- Maureen Taylor (USA)
- Amelinha Teles (Brazil)
- Dora Maria Tellez (Nicaragua)
- Anna Titkow (Poland)
- Nataraj Trinta (Brazil)
- Bozena Uminska (Poland)
- Martha Heriberta Valle (Nicaragua)
- Ruth Vanita (India)
- Elizabeth Viana (Brazil)
- Shirley Villela (Brazil)
- Olga Voronina (Russia)
- Cuiyi, Wang (China)
- Xingjuan, Wang (China)
- Giovana Xavier (Brazil)
- Li Xi, Zhang (China)

== Funding ==
The GFP is partially funded by the following grants and research initiatives:

- Institute for Research on Women and Gender, Collaborative Planning Grant
- Rackham Graduate School
- Third Century Learning Initiative, Intensifying Student Learning Grant
- College of Literature, Science and the Arts
- Women's Studies Program
- Center for South Asian Studies
- Center for Latin American and Caribbean Studies (the Brazil Initiative)
