= Mike Hamlin =

American labor activist and social worker (1935–2017)

- Born: 1935; Canton, Mississippi
- Died: April 18, 2017 (aged 81)
- Years active: 1967-2017
- Known for: Labor activism

Mike Hamlin (1935-2017) was an American labor activist and social worker.

Hamlin was born in Mississippi and moved to Ecorse, Michigan just outside of Detroit in 1947.

Hamlin is featured in the documentary Finally Got The News which documents the formation, movement practices, and philosophy of the League of Revolutionary Black Workers (LRBW), a Marxist–Leninist organization of Black workers in Detroit that he co-founded.

== Early life ==
Hamlin was born to a sharecropping family on a rural plantation near Canton, Mississippi. In August 1947 he moved to the industrial town of Ecorse. Hamlin attended the University of Michigan before being forced to end his studies as a result of limited financial means. In 1956 he joined the Army and began his basic training in 1957 at a military base in Missouri.

== Activism ==
Upon return in 1960, Hamlin landed a job at the Detroit News assisting drivers. His involvement post the 1967 Detroit rebellion led him to join in the creation of Inner City Voice, a local periodical circulating in Detroit communities. The role of the Inner City Voice community in shaping the emergent Dodge Revolutionary Union Movement (1968) and League of Revolutionary Black Workers (1968) has been documented in numerous periodicals, books, and academic scholarship. In the updated edition of Detroit: I Do Mind Dying Hamlin explains, "What distinguished the League of Revolutionary Black Workers was that we were able to engage masses of black workers at a time when people didn't know how to approach or mobilize them".

Hamlin went on to organize numerous other groups and coalitions in Detroit. He returned to college eventually earning his Masters of Social Work, working with the UAW, and as a professor of Black Studies at Wayne State University. He died on April 18, 2017.
