= Debbie Amis Bell =

American activist (1940–2017)

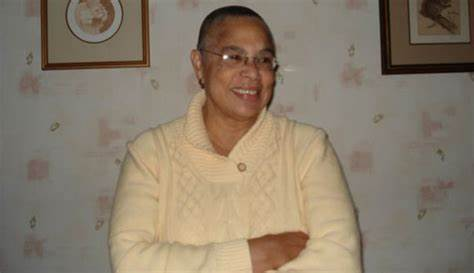
- Born: Debbie Amis; 1940 Philadelphia, PA
- Died: February 5, 2017
- Education: Overbrook High, West Chester University
- Organization(s): Communist Party USA, SNCC, Philadelphia Federation of Teachers, American Federation of Teachers
- Known for: Civil Rights activism
- Spouse: David Bell
- Children: Renee Bell & Andrea Bell

Debbie Amis Bell (1940 – February 5, 2017) was an American Civil Rights activist, SNCC (Student Nonviolent Coordinating Committee) member, and active associate of the Communist Party USA. Bell was a Field Organizer for the SNCC. She is most well known for her work within schools, churches, her community, and Black owned businesses. Bell was also the head of the Philadelphia Federation of Teachers. Much of her work was carried out in Atlanta, Georgia. She was also active in her home state of Pennsylvania.

== Biography ==
She was born in Philadelphia, Pennsylvania, in 1940 and died on February 5, 2017, at 77 years old. She became leader of the Communist Party USA's Philadelphia District.

== Early life, education, and activism ==
Bell graduated from Overbrook High School and had her sights set on becoming a teacher. She chose to go to school in West Chester, PA. At this time, West Chester was a segregated town with very newly segregated schools. The traditional route for African American women with the same aspirations as Bell would have chosen to go to Cheyney State. Bell's reasoning for going to West Chester was simply because West Chester offered classes that she was interested in taking as opposed to other "traditional" schools like Cheyney. When Debbie was a senior in college, the communist party that she was affiliated with had asked her to attend a student Civil Rights conference down south in Raleigh, North Carolina. This conference was none other than the founding conference for the Student Nonviolent Coordinating Committee (SNCC). After the conference had finished Bell knew that she wanted to help contribute. She stated "I was determined to make a difference." Debbie was offered a job as a secretary for the SNCC. She declined stating that she was "not going to accept a traditionally female position."

== Communist Party USA (CPUSA) ==
Debbie Bell joined the CPUSA at the early age of 17 years old and was an active member for more than 50 years. The United States was still getting over the "Red Scare" during this time. As you might imagine, most United States Citizens and US officials were not friendly towards Communist Party members. The FBI eventually contacted the SNCC and told them that they had an active communist on their staff. Bell was eventually sent to prison in the midst of an SNCC march. While in jail, Debbie planned a hunger strike in hopes of bringing awareness to the inhumane conditions that herself and other black inmates had to endure in the segregated jail. This landed her a spot in solitary confinement for setting a "bad example". This consisted of a cement room with no bed, no mattress, no sink, and a hole in the floor for bathroom use. She was kept in that cell for three days without any contact except for a trustee who would sneak her pen and paper so that she could write to her parents and let them know that she was okay.

== Later life ==
After being released from prison Bell was no longer able to work for the SNCC. She returned to Pennsylvania and became a teacher in the public school system. The last school she worked in was Overbrook High, her alma mater, where she was the elected union representative.
