= African American Women in Defense of Ourselves =

1991 public proclamation by 1,600 women

African American Women In Defense of Ourselves was a public proclamation made by over 1,600 Black women in response to the Senate Judiciary’s treatment of law professor Anita Hill during the United States Committee on the Judiciary confirmation hearings of United States Supreme Court nominee Clarence Thomas. Amid national controversy over Hill’s testimony of sexual harassment, the proclamation appeared as a full-page advertisement in The New York Times on November 17, 1991, and in seven Black newspapers across the country: The Atlanta Inquirer, The Chicago Defender, Amsterdam News, The City Sun (NYC), the D.C. Spotlight, Los Angeles Sentinel, and San Francisco Sun Reporter. Scholars widely recognize the effort as a key moment in the history of Black feminist activism and the articulation of intersectional analysis in public discourse.

== Background ==
In October 1991, the U.S. Senate Judiciary Committee held hearings to consider the nomination of Clarence Thomas to the Supreme Court. Anita Hill, a law professor, testified that Thomas had sexually harassed her during their time working together at the Equal Employment Opportunity Commission (EEOC). Hill’s testimony and the subsequent treatment she received from senators and media sparked national debates about race, gender, sexual harassment, and power in the workplace.

Immediately following Anita Hill’s testimony in 1991, three women, Barbara Ransby, Elsa Barkley Brown, and Deborah King launched an effort to draft a proclamation to protest Congress’ treatment of Anita Hill and to raise funds to purchase advertising space for the proclamation to run in several newspapers. The signatories raised over $50,000 in just a few weeks.

== Proclamation ==
The proclamation began, "As women of African descent, we are deeply troubled by the recent nomination, confirmation and seating of Clarence Thomas as an Associate Justice of the U.S. Supreme Court." It asserted that Clarence Thomas' confirmation would endanger "the rights of all women, poor and working class people and the elderly." It further framed Anita Hill's testimony as part of a larger pattern of violence against Black women, and criticized the narrative that the allegations were a choice between gender and race, and stated "As women of African descent, we understand sexual harassment as both." It specifically called out Thomas' manipulation of historical trauma, such as the legacy of lynching, to deflect from the reality of sexual abuse in Black women's lives.

The proclamation ended with a pledge to “speak out in defense of one another, in defense of the African American community and against those who are hostile to social justice no matter what color they are. No one will speak for us but ourselves.”

=== Publication and Reach ===
The proclamation appeared in The New York Times on November 17, 1991. It also ran in seven Black newspapers across the United States. These included major outlets such as the Chicago Defender and The Amsterdam News.

== Legacy ==
After completing the project, the organizers formed an organization named African American Women in Defense of Ourselves which lasted several years.

Kimberlé Crenshaw, who coined the term intersectionality, has stated that the proclamation "still stands among black feminists as one of the most poignant moments of our own truth-speaking against feminist and antiracist mobilizations that frequently ignored our very existence."

According to Professor Emeritus of Politics at Bates College Leslie Hill, the proclamation reflected "this fury about the way Anita Hill was being treated, but also about the way in which black women’s experiences were being dismissed".

The proclamation was part of a national response that has been cited as a precursor to later mobilizations, including the 1992 “The Year of the Woman," in U.S. electoral politics and the #MeToo movement of the 2010s. During the 2018 confirmation hearings of Supreme Court nominee Brett Kavanaugh, many revisited the proclamation to draw parallels between Anita Hill’s testimony and that of Christine Blasey Ford.

In 1992, Barbara Ransby, Elsa Barkely Brown, and Deborah King commemorated the effort and ad with a poster designed by Amy E. Burnell, printed by Kitchen Table: Women of Color Press and distributed by Syracuse Cultural Workers.

In 2021, the 30th anniversary of the ad was marked by commemorative panels, articles, and archival projects that revisited its significance.

== Notable signatories ==
- Barbara Ransby
- Elsa Barkley Brown
- Deborah King
- Kimberlé Crenshaw
- Leslie Hill
- Ntozake Shange
- Paula Giddings
- Anna Deveare Smith
- Nina Shaw

== See also ==
- Anita Hill
- Clarence Thomas Supreme Court nomination
- Black feminism
- Intersectionality
- Year of the Woman
- Combahee River Collective
