= Black Manifesto =

Manifesto calling for slavery and segregation reparations payments

The Black Manifesto was a 1969 manifesto that demanded $500 million (~$3.19 billion in 2023) in reparations from white churches and synagogues for their participation in the injustices of slavery and segregation committed against African-Americans.

== History ==
The manifesto was developed during the National Black Economic Development Conference held in Detroit, Michigan, in 1969. American civil rights activist James Forman presented the first draft of the manifesto on April 26, 1969, receiving the support of the conference in a 187-63 vote of delegates.

=== Demands ===
The manifesto made the argument that much of America had been built with black slave labor, and that churches and synagogues had implicitly played a role in facilitating that process. Its opening paragraph read:

We the black people assembled in Detroit, Michigan for the National Black Economic Development Conference are fully aware that we have been forced to come together because racist white America has exploited our resources, our minds, our bodies, our labor. For centuries we have been forced to live as colonized people inside the United States, victimized by the most vicious, racist system in the world. We have helped to build the most industrial country in the world.

The text of the manifesto demanded $500 million in donations from churches and synagogues, to be routed to a specific group of organizations, some of which had yet to be formed. The largest demand was for the creation of a $200 million land bank in the American South, in order "to help our brothers and sisters who have to leave their land because of racist pressure for people who want to establish cooperative farms". $40 million was to be divided equally among four publishing and printing companies serving the black communities of Detroit, Atlanta, Los Angeles and New York. Four television networks, meant "as an alternative to racist propaganda" were to be established with $10 million each, in Detroit, Chicago, Cleveland and Washington, D.C. $30 million would go to the establishment of a research center into the social problems faced by African-Americans. $130 million was designated to begin a black university in the American south.

=== Publication ===
Forman presented the manifesto to the public on May 4, 1969 at New York City's Riverside Church, interrupting a Sunday service to do so. The day earlier, Forman had requested and been denied permission to speak, by the minister Rev. Dr. Ernest Campbell. Trying to prevent Forman's speech, Campbell directed the organist to play and also began a silent walkout of congregants. The church obtained a civil restraining order against Forman the same week.

The manifesto was also read out loud on May 4 at the First United Presbyterian Church of San Francisco. It was later published in the July 10, 1969 edition of the New York Review of Books.

=== Outcomes ===
The manifesto's demands were ultimately rejected by most churches and synagogues. A few churches made donations to the organizations mentioned in the manifesto, and several reassessed their processes to ensure equal opportunity to people of color. On August 29, 1969, Time magazine wrote that "Since Forman first issued his arrogantly worded 'Black Manifesto' in Detroit last April, only an estimated $22,000 [equivalent to $188,637 in 2024] has trickled into the coffers of his National Black Economic Development Conference." Forman's demands were regarded as successful, however, as a catalyst in moving churches to examine their consciences.
