= Motor City Labor League =

The Motor City Labor League or Motor City Labor Coalition was a labor organization based in Detroit, Michigan, U.S. It adhered to a form of Marxism–Leninism and operated under the principle of democratic centralism.

It was the white counterpart of the League of Revolutionary Black Workers.

Besides work in among Detroit's working class, it focused on organizing against the war in Vietnam, supporting radical organizing in local unions, opposition to STRESS, a Detroit police unit known for police brutality. Electorally, it successfully worked to get one of its members, lawyer Justin C. Ravitz, to Detroit's Recorder's Court.
