= League of Revolutionary Black Workers =

Detroit-based black radical labor organization (1969–1971)

- Abbreviation: LRBW
- Founded: June 1969
- Dissolved: June 1971
- Preceded by: Dodge Revolutionary Union Movement (DRUM)
- Succeeded by: Black Workers Congress; Communist League; Communist Labor Party
- Headquarters: Detroit, Michigan
- Newspaper: Inner City Voice
- Ideology: Communism; Marxism–Leninism; Black liberation Trade unionism

The League of Revolutionary Black Workers (LRBW) was formed in 1969 in Detroit, Michigan. The League united multiple revolutionary union movements (RUMs) that were proliferating across the auto industry and other sectors in Detroit where black workers were concentrated. The formation of the LRBW was an attempt to create a single political unit guided by the principles of Black liberation and Marxism-Leninism to achieve concrete gains for black workers. While the LRBW was only in existence for a relatively short time, its presence marked a sharp rise in the militancy and political activism of black workers, and in the growth of black liberation movements in the United States.

== Background ==
Throughout the 1950s and '60s, there were several factors contributing to the creation of a revolutionary black workers movement in Detroit. Among them:

(1) The mood of black rebellion in the city (and indeed throughout the U.S.), and the increasing political agitation within Detroit's underclass. The 1967 Detroit riot was one of the largest and most violent of the urban insurrections that swept the U.S. between 1964 and 1968. The Detroit insurrection was led by working-class black youth, some of whom adopted Marxist–Leninist teachings. Many who later joined the League of Revolutionary Black Workers (LRBW) were involved in the insurrection, including John Watson. He launched a radical ghetto newspaper called Inner City Voice in September 1967, following the intense police repression of the riot.

(2) The marginalized status of black workers in trade unions. During the labor shortages of World War II, blacks in Detroit had been hired in significant numbers, particularly in the auto industry. While they formally belonged to the United Auto Workers (UAW), most black workers believed their workplace concerns were not being addressed, and they felt alienated from the UAW's majority white leadership, perceiving it as hardly different from the factory bosses and government officials.

(3) Detroit's position as a hub of black radicalism. In the late 1940s and early '50s while he still lived in the U.S., noted Marxist scholar C. L. R. James led a circle of radical intellectuals that was known as the Johnson–Forest Tendency; it evolved into the Facing Reality group which had a strong presence in Detroit. In 1963, black students at Wayne State University formed a revolutionary cadre they called UHURU. It included future LRBW leaders Luke Tripp, John Williams, John Watson, Charles Johnson, and General Gordon Baker Jr. ("General" was his given name). These same students also attended Marxist study classes taught by Wayne State professor, and C. L. R. James disciple, Martin Glaberman. During the 1960s, the left-wing author and auto worker James Boggs and his wife Grace Lee Boggs were holding political discussions in their Detroit home. The city also had an active chapter of the Trotskyite Socialist Workers Party that was pamphleteering and organizing in the black community.

== The League's formation ==
The triggering event that led to the LRBW's formation was a wildcat strike on May 2, 1968 at the Dodge Main factory. The spontaneous labor action, involving over 3,000 workers, was a response to a recent speedup on the assembly lines. Although the wildcatters were directed by both black and white workers, the punishment doled out by Chrysler for the action was disproportionately inflicted upon black workers. Seven people, including five blacks, were fired, with all but two, General Baker and Bennie Tate, eventually rehired. Following the strike, nine workers from the plant established close relationships with the editors of Inner City Voice (ICV), and decided to form the first Revolutionary Union Movement, called the Dodge Revolutionary Union Movement (DRUM).

Following the creation of DRUM, the workers and ICV editors began to circulate a weekly newsletter, titled drum, inside the plant. One of the largest actions that DRUM organized was a July 7, 1968 rally in the Dodge Main parking lot, and a wildcat strike the next day. These actions were in protest of working conditions in the plant and of the UAW's failure to represent the needs of black auto workers. The rally and wildcat strike brought together a number of black community groups and radical white organizations, and was deemed a success by DRUM leadership. DRUM then organized other actions directed against what they viewed as their two principal enemies: the Chrysler factory bosses and the UAW leadership.

Throughout 1968 and early 1969, more revolutionary union movements formed at other plants, such as the Ford Revolutionary Union Movement (FRUM) and Chrysler's Eldon Avenue Revolutionary Union Movement (ELRUM). The spread of RUMs was not limited to the auto industry; there were equivalent developments occurring among United Parcel Service workers (UPRUM), health workers (HRUM), and Detroit News workers (NEWRUM).

As more RUMs sprang up at workplaces across Detroit, it became clear that a centralized organization was needed to coordinate this burgeoning black worker movement. In June 1969, the League of Revolutionary Black Workers was formed. In September, it established its headquarters at 179 Cortland Street. The newspaper Inner City Voice (ICV) was the official organ of the LRBW.

== League activities and ideology ==
In its early months, the LRBW encouraged more wildcat strikes. Although it did not issue directives to the various RUMs, it acted as a forum for RUM members to discuss ideas, plans, and grievances. The LRBW soon began to insert itself into local union politics by running DRUM candidates for UAW positions, but the electoral efforts were not successful. While the League continued its focus on in-plant organizing of black workers, it also participated in political activities in Detroit, for example, helping to start the Detroit chapter of the Black Panther Party, and setting up a coalition group that sought to achieve community control of the city's public schools.

At the outset, the LRBW exhibited ideological cohesiveness. In a credo published in ICV in 1970, the opening sentences read: "The League of Revolutionary Black Workers is dedicated to waging a relentless struggle against racism, capitalism, and imperialism. We are struggling for the liberation of black people in the confines of the United States as well as to play a major revolutionary role in the liberation of all oppressed people in the world." But as James Geschwender points out, there were unresolved contradictions in the ideology, such as:

Black workers are unlikely to be able to carry out a socialist revolution without white allies but white workers are seen as enemies. Wars of national liberation require the unified actions of all blacks but a socialist revolution requires that black workers overthrow black along with white capitalists.... It is difficult to engage in principled cooperation with white radicals if all whites are defined as exploiters and enemies. It is also difficult to build a community support movement if all members of the black bourgeoisie are also defined as exploiters and enemies.

Geschwender adds that these contradictions—which centered around the need to reconcile the black liberation struggle with the traditional Marxist-Leninist emphasis on worker liberation—caused strains in the LRBW leadership.

== Rise of factions ==
The League's central staff (CS) swelled to 80 members, who were controlled by a seven-person Executive Board (EB) consisting of General Baker, Kenneth Cockrel, Mike Hamlin, Luke Tripp, John Watson, John Williams, and Chuck Wooten. Factions arose within the EB based on differing notions about the most effective tactics for the League to pursue. The first faction was led by General Baker and Chuck Wooten. They stressed in-plant organizing and the creation of new RUMs as the primary task of the organization. This idea was articulated in the League's constitution:

We must act swiftly to help organize DRUM type organizations wherever there are Black workers, be it in Lynn Townsend's kitchen, the White House, White Castle, Ford Rouge, the Mississippi Delta, the plains of Wyoming, the mines of Bolivia, the rubber plantations of Indonesia, the oil fields of Biafra, or the Chrysler plant in South Africa.

The second faction argued that building external ties would better support the workers in the factories; this was dubbed the out-of-plant tendency. It was expansion-minded and keen on moving beyond Detroit to implement a national strategy. Its key proponents were Mike Hamlin, John Watson, Ken Cockrel, and ex-SNCC leader James Forman, who joined the LRBW's central staff later in 1969 and promised to relocate to Detroit. These men believed it was just as vital to forge connections with students, white radicals, and neighborhood organizations as it was to form new RUMs. The second faction also placed great value on agitational newspapers and films, and was principally involved in making the 1970 documentary film about the LRBW, Finally Got the News.

The League's third faction was represented by Luke Tripp and John Williams, who staked out a sort of middle position. They focused on raising political consciousness of LRBW supporters, both outside the plants and among workers in the plants. Additionally, Tripp and Williams warned about the LRBW striving to grow too quickly without laying the necessary groundwork for a community-supported revolutionary workers movement. They cautioned against trying to spread the League to other cities without first consolidating and fine-tuning the Detroit organization; they advocated for small political meetings with workers, students and community members as the key to developing an ideologically advanced Detroit working class.

== Dissolution ==
=== Black Workers Congress ===
LRBW's dissolution can be traced to 1970 and the creation of the Black Workers Congress (BWC). It was largely the brainchild of James Forman and the second faction that wanted "to take the Detroit organization national". Forman had made a strong impression on the LRBW when he read the Black Manifesto at the conclusion of the Black Economic Development Conference (BEDC) in late April 1969. The Manifesto called for $500 million in reparations from white churches and synagogues to provide blacks with economic self-sufficiency. Forman's name recognition from the Civil Rights movement, combined with the headlines occasioned by the Manifesto, gave the League national media attention. However, LRBW leaders like General Baker were suspicious of trying to short-cut the process "through a spectacular media campaign rather than sticking to the arduous task of organizing workers, and he refused to be on the BEDC steering committee. Baker was also wary of famous 'outside' individuals who did not love DRUM the way Detroiters did and who had no permanent stake in the city."

Tensions arose over the role of the BWC. Its advocates envisioned it as a nationwide coalition of black radical labor activists, and therefore the LRBW in Detroit would be subordinate to the BWC. Conversely, League members saw the BWC as merely the political/propaganda arm of the LRBW and "a creature of the League". These tensions were not resolved and by June 1971, three LRBW Executive Board members – Ken Cockrel, Mike Hamlin, and John Watson – joined Forman in resigning from the League to concentrate their efforts on the BWC, which had its founding convention in September 1971.

=== "Easter purges" ===
By the second half of 1970, the Executive Board (EB) had become increasingly remote and disconnected from the rest of the League and from factory workers in the RUMs. At a December 1970 retreat, several members of the League's central staff (CS) proposed restructuring the organization, including the EB, to make it more responsive to the rank-and-file. The proposal was initially met with EB silence. Then, at a general meeting in March 1971, "some EB members spoke of the 'disrespect for leadership and authority' in the CS". In April the EB voted unanimously to expel seven CS members: Modibo Kadalie (E.C. Cooper), Ernie "Mkalimoto" Allen, Loren "Imara Hyman" Small, Sonny Hyman, Zondalin Hyman, Shola Akintolaya, and Makeba Jones. Allen and Akintolaya were specifically charged with "insubordination"; CS spouses were also purged as "security risks". In an essay on the decline of the LRBW, Allen wrote:

The "Easter purges" and the events leading to them produced an effect on the LRBW which no one could have anticipated. Principled criticisms of the organization, as well as measures designed to address its fundamental problems, had been offered; the only "counter" which the EB could find in its political repertoire was that of "hard-line" policy. The effects of that policy on the rank-and-file as well as on the EB itself constituted the immediate causes leading to the break-up of the LRBW.

=== End of the LRBW ===
According to Dan Georgakas and Marvin Surkin, the LRBW split—largely precipitated by the exodus of BWC proponents—became public on June 12, 1971: "By the first of the year, those who remained in the League were making plans to affiliate what was left of the organization with a group called the Communist League. The League of Revolutionary Black Workers had become history."

== Aftermath ==
In September 1971, the remaining League members decided to merge with a California-based political organization called the Communist League, which evolved over the next few years into the Communist Labor Party. Max Elbaum speculated that as a result of the merger, and the influx of black industrial workers from the LRBW, the Communist League may have had more blacks, Chicanos and women in its ranks than any other leftist organization at the time.

The Communist League also absorbed members from the Motor City Labor League (MCLL), which had experienced a political split similar to the LRBW. The MCLL was represented by activists such as anti-war veteran Frank Joyce, and Sheila Murphy who would later become a Detroit City Councilwoman. In 1978, Murphy married former LRBW Executive Board member Ken Cockrel.

General Baker remained active in the Communist League and the Communist Labor Party (CLP). In 1976 and 1978, he was the CLP's candidate for State Representative in the Michigan House. In 1993 when the CLP disbanded, Baker was one of the leaders of the newly formed League of Revolutionaries for a New America.
