= General Baker =

General Gordon Baker Jr.
- Born: September 6, 1941; Detroit
- Died: May 18, 2014 (aged 72); Detroit
- Occupation: Autoworker
- Known for: Revolutionary Union Movement
- Spouse: Marian Kramer

General Gordon Baker Jr. (September 6, 1941 – May 18, 2014) was an American labor organizer and activist.

== Biography ==
General Baker was born in Detroit, Michigan, where his parents had relocated from Georgia so that his father could find work in the automotive industry. Baker graduated from Southwestern High School in 1958.

As a student at Wayne State University, Baker studied the work of Karl Marx and became involved in socialism and Black nationalism. In 1963 he co-founded UHURU (Swahili for "freedom"), an African-American student organization at Wayne.

Baker visited Cuba in 1964 to study the Castro government. After returning to Detroit, he found work at the Dodge Main plant in Hamtramck, Michigan.

In 1965, Baker wrote an open letter to the draft board, refusing its request that he appear for an examination to determine his fitness to serve in the Vietnam War, a landmark in American draft resistance during that era.

In the late 1960s, Baker was a co-founder of the Dodge Revolutionary Union Movement (DRUM) and the League of Revolutionary Black Workers (LRBW). He was fired from his job after participating in a series of wildcat strikes, and was subsequently unable to find work in the industry until he applied under a false name at the Ford Rouge Plant in Dearborn, Michigan.

Baker twice ran for public office, as a candidate for the Michigan House of Representatives in the late 1970s.

A leading member of the League of Revolutionaries for a New America (LRNA) for two decades beginning in the 1990s, Baker was chair of its steering committee.

Baker died in Detroit of congestive heart failure, aged 72.

== See also ==
“General Baker was the organizer of the League of Revolutionary Black Workers in Detroit, the black auto workers movement. His father’s name was ‘General’and he was named after him. General Baker was the smartest guy in the Sixties. He understood everything, he had an analysis of capital and race way beyond everything from the point of view of black workers in mass production industries.... I still go back to try to think about things through him.” (Dale W. Tomich, 2024)
