= James Forman =

American civil rights leader (1928–2005)

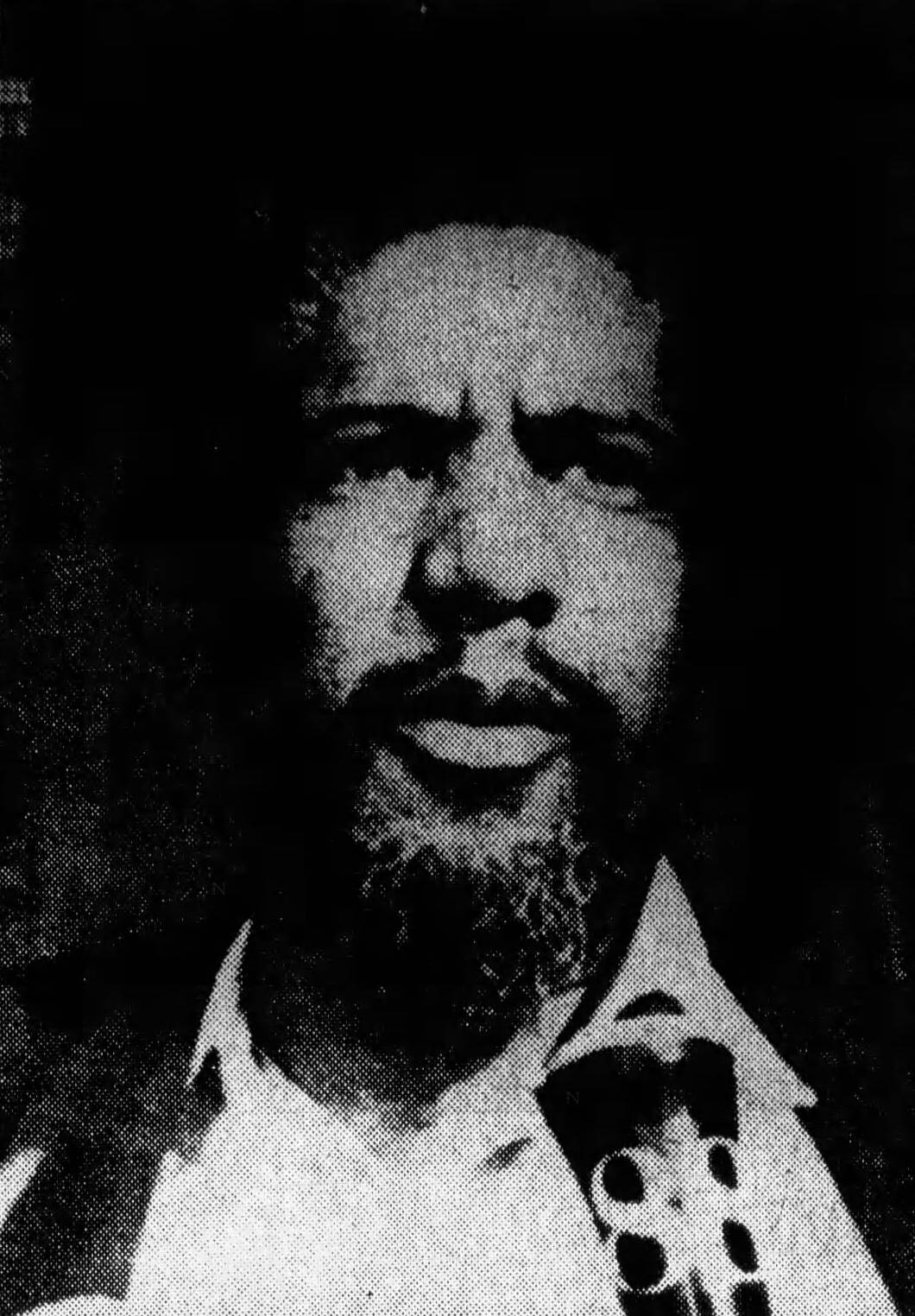
- Forman, c. 1969
- Born: October 4, 1928; Chicago, Illinois, U.S.
- Died: January 10, 2005 (aged 76); Washington, D.C., U.S.
- Education: Roosevelt University; Boston University; Cornell University
- Known for: Student Nonviolent Coordinating Committee, Black Panther Party
- Children: 2, including James Forman Jr.

James Forman (October 4, 1928 – January 10, 2005) was a prominent African-American leader in the civil rights movement. He was active in the Student Nonviolent Coordinating Committee (SNCC), the Black Panther Party, and the League of Revolutionary Black Workers. As the executive secretary of SNCC from 1961 to 1966, Forman played a significant role in the Selma to Montgomery marches.

After the 1960s, Forman spent the rest of his adult life organizing black people around issues of social and economic equality. He also taught at American University and other major institutions. He wrote several books documenting his experiences within the movement and his evolving political philosophy including Sammy Younge Jr.: The First Black College Student to Die in the Black Liberation Movement (1969), The Making of Black Revolutionaries (1972 and 1997) and Self Determination: An Examination of the Question and Its Application to the African American People (1984).

The New York Times called him "a civil rights pioneer who brought a fiercely revolutionary vision and masterly organizational skills to virtually every major civil rights battleground in the 1960s."

== Early life and education ==
Forman was born on October 4, 1928, in Chicago, Illinois. As an 11-month-old baby, he was sent to live with his grandmother, "Mama Jane", on her farm in Marshall County, Mississippi. He was raised in a "dirt-poor" environment; it was not uncommon for him to eat dirt because it was believed to have some nutritional value. In his autobiography, he called eating dirt a "staple" of his diet. He recalls being "hungry all the time." His family had no outhouse and no electricity. They used leaves, newspapers, and corncobs for toilet paper, and they used twigs as toothbrushes. Despite these things, Forman claims to have never questioned his poverty and did not understand it at the time. His Aunt Thelma once caught James reading a shopping catalog in the dark. She, being a school teacher, took an interest in accelerating James' studying and gave him lessons at home. James credits his upbringing for his eventual successes, saying his grandmother gave him a sense for justice while his aunt gave him his "intellectual fire."

=== Awareness of racism ===
James' first experience with lynching came when a white man showed up on his doorstep, asking for food and asking that they not tell anyone where he was. The next day, news spread that a white man had been lynched although Forman never learned why. When Forman was around the age of six he had his first experience with racial segregation. While visiting an aunt in Tennessee, Forman attempted to buy a Coca-Cola from a local drugstore. He was told that if he wanted to buy one that he would have to drink it in the back and not at the counter.

Confused, Forman asked why and was told "Boy, you're a nigger." This was the first time in his life he realized that because of the color of his skin that there were "things [he] could and could not do, and other people had the 'right' to tell [him] what [he] could and could not do."

In the summer of 1935, Forman moved to Chicago to live with his mother and step-father. That September he enrolled in St. Anselm's Catholic School, his first official schooling, and was immediately put into the second grade. When playing with the neighborhood kids he would throw rocks and cans at white pedestrians and threw bricks off of roofs and onto police cars. However, his new school put a lot of pressure on him to convert to Catholicism, with his Protestantism becoming a "great issue" by the 6th grade. Being the only Protestant at an all-Catholic school put James through "great emotional turmoil." He decided to transfer to the local public school, the Betsy Ross Grammar School. He did so well there that he was allowed to skip the first semester of the seventh grade.

From the age of seven onward, James earned a small amount from selling issues of the Chicago Defender. He would often read these papers which helped develop a "strong sense of protest." He read the works of Booker T. Washington and W. E. B. Du Bois and was heavily influenced by Du Bois. He called Washington an "apologist" and often quoted Du Bois and his call for advancing blacks through education. He had yet to enter high school but for James the "race issue was on my mind, before my eyes, and in my blood."

After finishing his primary education, Forman enrolled in Englewood Technical Prep Academy. He started his high school career by taking vocational courses instead of the general, pre-college coursework. This led to a poor performance and eventually a suspension from school. He was sent to a continuation school, Washburne High, he got a job as a paper roller at Cuneo Press, and joined a gang known as the "Sixty-first Raiders." His gang activity was very limited in scope and he said he thought using drugs was "a waste of time." Around the age of fourteen James Forman, who had been going under the name of James Rufus, found out that his step-father was not his real father by happening upon his own birth certificate. His real father was a cab driver that Forman coincidentally met and introduced himself to while working at his step-father's gas station.

When Forman returned to high school he returned to general coursework and was an honors student. During school he was influenced by the writings of such figures as Richard Wright and Carl Sandburg. He received ROTC training and the Chicago Tribune Silver and gold medal for efficiency as a non-commissioned officer; he was a lieutenant upon graduation. He was also the honor student of his graduating class which landed him an interview in the Chicago Tribune. During the interview he said that when he grew up he wanted to become a "humanitarian" and a minister as opposed to a preacher. He graduated from high school in January 1947.

Shortly after Forman graduated from high school he was kicked out of his house after an argument with his stepfather. He tried to join the United States Army for a two-year period but because of a racial quota he had to settle on joining the United States Air Force for a period of three years. Due to the Korean War his stay was extended to four years. Forman would go on to regret this decision and call the armed forces a "dehumanizing machine which destroys thought and creativity in order to preserve the economic system and the political myths of the United States." He met his first wife, Mary, in California two weeks before being shipped off to Okinawa in 1948. They divorced three years later, in 1951. After his discharge the penniless Forman moved to the slums of Oakland. He was eventually able to raise enough money to attend the University of Southern California. During his second semester, after a long night of studying, a police car stopped in front of him. They called him out and said that a robbery had occurred and Forman looked suspicious. Forman denied any wrongdoing but was apprehended anyway. He demanded a phone call and various other civil rights but instead was locked up for three days while being beaten and interrogated. This caused him severe trauma, for which he sought therapy.

Forman overcame his trauma and returned to Chicago in 1954. His step-father died that summer and he enrolled at Roosevelt University that fall. He became president of the student body at Roosevelt and graduated in three years. Forman then went to graduate school at Boston University where he began to develop the ideas of a successful social movement. He wanted blacks to come together and start a visible movement. He knew the movement had to use nonviolent direct action, students, and it had to be started in the South. He was also against monolithic, charismatic leaders because he wanted whatever was created to not die along with the leader. In 1958 he visited Little Rock, Arkansas because he was tired of being an "armchair revolutionary." He taught in Chicago's public schools and worked with dispossessed tenant farmers in Tennessee before joining SNCC.

== National organizing with SNCC ==
In 1961, Forman joined the newly formed Student Nonviolent Coordinating Committee (SNCC, pronounced "snick"). From 1961 to 1966, Forman, a decade older and more experienced than most of the other members of SNCC, became responsible for providing organizational support to the young, loosely affiliated activists by paying bills, radically expanding the institutional staff and planning the logistics for programs. Under the leadership of Forman and others, SNCC became an important political player at the height of the civil rights movement. SNCC began as an affiliate of another direct action group of the movement, Martin Luther King Jr.'s Southern Christian Leadership Conference. At times, Forman's more confrontational and radical style of activism clashed with King's Christian pacifist approach.

In August 1961, Forman was jailed with other freedom riders protesting segregated facilities in Monroe, North Carolina. This episode brought him into contact with Robert F. Williams who won Forman's admiration. After his sentence was suspended, Forman agreed to become executive secretary of SNCC.

Forman's occasional criticism of King was not simply a political exercise, but reflected a genuine concern about the direction King was leading the movement in. He specifically questioned King's top-down leadership style, which he saw as undermining the development of local grassroots movements. For example, following W. G. Anderson's invitation to King to join the Albany Movement, Forman criticized the move because he felt much harm could be done by interjecting the Messiah complex. He recognized that King's presence would detract from, rather than intensify, the focus on local people's leadership in the movement. Forman echoed the concerns of those in SNCC and the broader civil rights movement who saw the potential dangers of relying too heavily upon one dynamic leader.

In an interview with Robert Penn Warren for the book Who Speaks for the Negro?, Forman laid out many of his ideas concerning SNCC, commenting that it is "the one movement in this country that has within its spheres of activity room for intellectuals."

Years before the famous Selma marches of 1965, Forman and other SNCC organizers visited the city to assist the voter registration work of Amelia Boynton and J. L. Chestnut. In addition to frontline organizing, Forman facilitated a visit by celebrities James Baldwin and Dick Gregory for Selma's first "Freedom Day" in October 1963—a day of mass African-American voter registration in a Jim Crow area.

Forman did significant work for SNCC in the cultural community. For instance, Forman recruited the young folk star Bob Dylan to play benefits and rallies for SNCC ( One of these rallies in Mississippi makes an appearance in the classic documentary Don't Look Back). When Dylan received an award from the Emergency Civil Liberties Committee he said the honor really belonged to "James Forman and SNCC."

=== Strategizing in the wake of Freedom Summer ===
In the summer of 1964, Forman was focussed with SNCC on the voter registration drive in Mississippi, "Freedom Summer", and on the challenge that was to be presented by the Mississippi Freedom Democratic Party (MFDP) to the seating of the all-white state delegation at the 1964 Democratic National Convention.

When, notwithstanding the national outrage generated by the violence in Mississippi (3 project workers killed; 4 people critically wounded; 80 beaten, 1,000 arrests; 35 shooting incidents, 37 churches bombed or burned; and 30 black businesses or homes burned), the Johnson Administration refused to seat the MFDP delegates at convention in August rather than further imperil the Democratic Party hold on the South, there was consternation and confusion within the movement. As an opportunity to take stock, to critique and reevaluate the movement, in November 1964 Forman helped organize a retreat in Waveland, Mississippi.

Like Ella Baker, in criticizing King's "messianic" leadership of the SCLC, Forman saw himself as championing popularly accountable, grassroots organization. Yet within SNCC itself, he had been increasingly concerned by the lack of "internal cohesion". At Waveland, he proposed that the staff (some twenty), who under the original constitution had had "a voice but no vote," constitute "themselves as the Coordinating Committee" and elect a new Executive. It was time to recognize that SNCC no longer had a "student base" (with the move to voter registration, the original campus protest groups had largely evaporated) and that the staff, "the people who do the most work," were the organization's real "nucleus". But the "many problems and many strains within the organization" caused by the "freedom" allowed to organizers in the field were also reason, he argued, to "change and alter" the structure of decision making. Given the "external pressures" the requirement now was for "unity".

He was opposed by Bob Moses. Moses believed that the role of SNCC was to stimulate social struggles, not to provide an institutionalized leadership. "Leadership," Moses believed, "is there in the people . . . If you go out and work with your people leadership will emerge. ... We don't know who they are now: and we don't need to know.

"To get us through the impasse," Casey Hayden tried to attach to Forman's proposal various sub-committees and provisos to ensure that "leadership for all our programs" would continue to be driven from the field, and not from central office, "which makes many program areas responsible to one person rather than to all of us." For Forman this still suggested too loose, too confederal a structure for an organization whose challenge, without the manpower and publicity of white volunteers, was to mount and coordinate a Southwide Freedom Summer and "build a Black Belt political party."

Sexism on Forman's part was evidenced by one SNCC worker, Gwendolyn Zoharah Simmons, who, following an attempted rape by a SNCC "comrade," went to a SNCC leader to complain and was told they "did not have time to deal with a trivial matter such as this. Adding insult to injury, I was told: ‘Why are you making such a fuss? We don’t have time for this. You should have given him some!’. That leader was identified by Dan Berger as James Forman.

=== Selma and Montgomery ===
External videos
- “Interview with James Forman” conducted in 1985 for Eyes on the Prize in which Forman talks about the "Turn Around Day", the March on Washington and the Selma to Montgomery Rights March, along with SNCC and SCLC.

When the second march out of Selma was turned around by Martin Luther King, Tuskegee Institute students decided to open a "Second Front" by marching to the Alabama State Capitol and delivering a petition to Governor George Wallace. They were quickly joined by Forman and much of the SNCC staff from Selma. The SNCC members distrusted King more than ever after the "turnaround Tuesday," and were eager to take a separate course. On March 11, 1965, SNCC began a series of demonstrations in Montgomery, and put out a national call for others to join them. James Bevel, SCLC's Selma leader, followed them and discouraged their activities, bringing him and SCLC into conflict with Forman and SNCC. Bevel accused Forman of trying to divert people from the Selma campaign and of abandoning nonviolent discipline. Forman accused Bevel of driving a wedge between the student movement and the local black churches. The argument was resolved only when both were arrested.

On March 15 and 16, SNCC led several hundred demonstrators, including Alabama students, Northern students, and local adults, in protests near the capitol complex. The Montgomery County sheriff's posse met them on horseback and drove them back, whipping them. Against the objections of James Bevel, some protesters threw bricks and bottles at police. At a mass meeting on the night of the 16th, Forman "whipped the crowd into a frenzy" demanding that the President act to protect demonstrators, and warned, "If we can't sit at the table of democracy, we'll knock the fucking legs off."

The New York Times featured the Montgomery confrontations on the front page the next day. Although King was concerned by Forman's violent rhetoric, he joined him in leading a march of 2000 people in Montgomery to the Montgomery County courthouse. According to historian Gary May, "City officials, also worried by the violent turn of events… apologized for the assault on SNCC protesters and invited King and Forman to discuss how to handle future protests in the city." In the negotiations, Montgomery officials agreed to stop using the county posse against protesters, and to issue march permits to blacks for the first time.

=== Ill-fated relationship with the Black Panthers ===
In May 1966, Forman was replaced by Ruby Doris Smith-Robinson, who was determined "to keep the SNCC together." But Forman recalls male leaders fighting "her attempts as executive secretary to impose a sense of organizational responsibility and self-discipline," and "trying to justify themselves by the fact that their critic was a woman". In October 1967 Smith-Robinson was to die "of exhaustion" according to one of her co-workers, "destroyed by the movement".

Replacing John Lewis as chairman in May 1966 was the 24-year old Stokely Carmichael. When on the night of June 16, 1966, following protests at the shooting of solo freedom marcher James Meredith, Carmichael walked out of jail (his 27th arrest) and into Broad Street Park in Greenwood, Mississippi, he asked the waiting crowd "What do you want?." They roared back "Black Power! Black Power!" With Carmichael, the Atlanta leadership was increasingly persuaded by the case Forman had made for a Black political party. Like Forman, who was now urging the study of Marxism, Carmichael hesitated to accept the implication that whites should be excluded from the movement, but this was the course taken. In December 1966, the SNCC national executive asked white co-workers and volunteers to leave, and in May 1967 told them to resign.

Heading up the SNCC operations in New York City, Forman had remained close to the leadership of SNCC. He helped them negotiate a merger with the Black Panther Party from whom he had accepted the honorary position of "Foreign Minister". When Carmichael returned from Ahmed Sékou Touré's Guinea in January 1968, he became "Prime Minister". But Forman was soon disillusioned, and in June 1968 joined with the SNCC national executive in rejecting any further association with the party. This was followed in July by a "violent confrontation" in his office in New York. In the course of a "heated discussion" Panthers accompanying Carmichael and Eldridge Cleaver, the Panthers' "Minister of Information", reportedly thrust a pistol into Forman's mouth. For Forman and SNCC this was "the last straw". Carmichael was expelled ("engaging in a power struggle" that "threatened the existence of the organization")—and "Forman wound up first in hospital, and later in Puerto Rico, suffering from a nervous breakdown".

=== Post-SNCC work ===
In 1969, after the failure of the merger with the Black Panthers and the decline of SNCC as an effective political organization, Forman began associating with other Black political radical groups. In Detroit he participated in the Black Economic Development Conference, where his Black Manifesto was adopted. He also founded a nonprofit organization called the Unemployment and Poverty Action Committee.

As a part of his "Black Manifesto", on a Sunday morning in May 1969 Forman interrupted services at New York City's Riverside Church to demand $500 million in reparations from white churches to make up for injustices African Americans had suffered over the centuries. Although Riverside's preaching minister, the Rev. Ernest T. Campbell, termed the demands "exorbitant and fanciful," he was in sympathy with the impulse, if not the tactic. Later, the church agreed to donate a fixed percentage of its annual income to anti-poverty efforts.

On May 30, 1969, Forman made plans to pursue a similar course at a Jewish Synagogue, Congregation Emanu-El of the City of New York. Members of the Jewish Defense League (JDL), led by Rabbi Meir Kahane, showed up carrying chains and clubs promising to confront Forman if he attempted to enter the synagogue. Kahane and the JDL forewarned Forman and the public about their intended actions and Forman never showed up at the synagogue.

== Later life and death ==
During the 1970s and 1980s, Forman completed graduate work at Cornell University in African and African-American Studies and in 1982, he received a Ph.D. from the Union of Experimental Colleges and Universities, in cooperation with the Institute for Policy Studies.

Forman spent the rest of his adult life organizing black and disenfranchised people around issues of progressive economic and social development and equality. He also taught at American University in Washington, D.C. He wrote several books documenting his experiences within the movement and his evolving political philosophy including Sammy Younge Jr.: The First Black College Student to Die in the Black Liberation Movement (1969), The Making of Black Revolutionaries (1972 and 1997) and Self Determination: An Examination of the Question and Its Application to the African American People (1984).

Forman died on January 10, 2005, of colon cancer, aged 76, at the Washington House, a hospice in Washington, DC.

== Personal life ==
Forman's marriages to Mary Forman and Mildred Thompson ended in divorce. He was married to Mildred Thompson Forman (now Mildred Page) from 1959 to 1965, during the most active period of SNCC. Mildred Forman moved to Atlanta with James and worked at the Atlanta SNCC office as well as working as coordinator for tours of The Freedom Singers.

During the 1960s and 1970s, Forman lived with Constancia "Dinky" Romilly, the second and only surviving child of the British-born journalist, anti-fascist activist and aristocrat, the Hon. Jessica Mitford, and her first husband, Esmond Romilly, who was a nephew-by-marriage of Sir Winston Churchill. Though obituaries and other posthumous articles about Forman have stated that he and Romilly were married, correspondence between Romilly's mother and aunts state that the couple were not legally husband and wife. (Note: According to a 13 March 1967 letter written at the time of the birth of the couple's first child by Constancia's aunt Deborah, the Duchess of Devonshire, to her sister Nancy Mitford, Romilly and Forman remained unwed "because she is white & would be a handicap to him in his political career (he is the right-hand man of one of the leading Negro politicians from the South) & I suppose that is rather insulting ..." Shortly afterward, Romilly's mother wrote to Nancy Mitford on 6 April 1967, "I don't quite fathom why she doesn't get married (as the babe's father, Jim Foreman [sic], and her have been living together for ages); but she seems happy with her rum lot, so that's a comfort.")

Forman and Romilly had two sons: Chaka Forman and James Forman Jr., who is a professor at Yale Law School.

=== Atheism ===
In his autobiography The Making Of Black Revolutionaries Forman devoted an entire chapter to explaining his atheism. He believed that "belief in God hurts my people." He also received the African American Humanist Award in 1994.

== Bibliography ==
- Sammy Younge, Jr: The First Black College Student to Die in the Black Liberation Movement. Open Hand Publishing LLC. 1968.
- La Liberation Viendra D'une Chose Noire (Paris: F. Maspero, 1968)
- The Political Thought of James Forman (Black Star, 1970)
- The Making of Black Revolutionaries (New York: Macmillan Co, 1972)
- Self Determination: An Examination of the Question and Its Application to the African American People (Open Hand Publishing LLC, 1984)
- High Tide of Black Resistance and Other Political & Literary Writings (Open Hand Publishing LLC, 1994)

== See also ==
- List of civil rights leaders
