= Sheila Cockrel =

American politician (born 1947)

Member of the Detroit City Council
- Incumbent
- Assumed office 1993

Personal details
- Spouse: Kenneth Cockrel Sr. (died 1988)
- Children: Kenneth Cockrel Jr. (stepson) Katherine Victoria Cockrel (daughter)

Sheila M. Cockrel née Sheila Murphy (born November 3, 1947) is an American politician and consultant. She was a member of the Detroit City Council from 1994 to 2009. The widow of Kenneth Cockrel, Sr. and stepmother of Kenneth Cockrel, Jr., she "had [a] fractious relationship with" Monica Conyers, whose resignation she called "an appropriate decision". When Dave Bing proposed a water rate hike, she was among those who voted in favor.

== 2009 activities ==
In 2009, Cockrel joined the adjunct faculty of Wayne State University's Irvin D. Reid Honors College. She taught two seminars and joined the Board of Visitors. She became the founder, CEO and president of Crossroads Consulting Group, a firm that assists companies in helping local governments.

== Testimony ==
In 2008, Cockrel testified to a grand jury regarding John Clark, former chief-of-staff to Kenneth Cockrel, Jr., allegedly taking bribes from Synagro Technologies, which won a $47-million sludge disposal contract with the city. She was one of five members of the council who voted in favor of this deal despite protests from residents.

== Education ==
Cockrel has a Bachelor of Arts in philosophy and a Master of Arts in urban planning from Wayne State University.

== Personal life ==
Cockrel is a Detroit native whose parents, Louis and Justine Murphy, founded the Catholic Worker Movement there. They oversaw the operations of the St. Martha House of Hospitality, a home for men and a soup kitchen for the needy. She married Ken, Sr. in 1978 and they had a daughter, Katherine, in 1985. In 1988, Ken died.

== Archival collection ==
Some of Cockrel and her husband's work is preserved in the Ken and Sheila Cockrel Papers, at the Walter P. Reuther Library in Detroit.
