= Barbara Ransby =

American historian (born 1957)

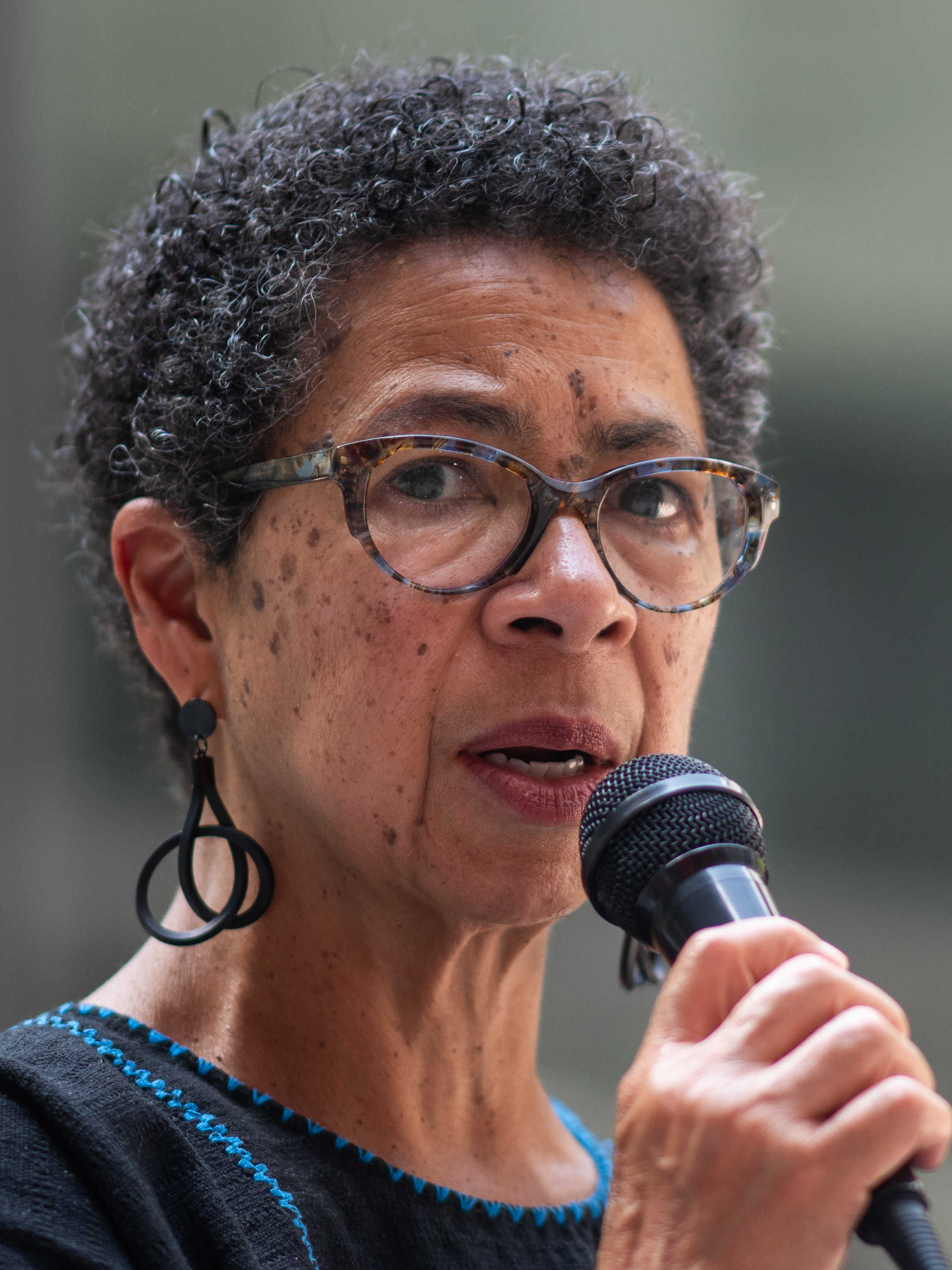
- Ransby in 2025
- Born: May 12, 1957 (age 69)
- Occupation: Academic
- Spouse: Peter Sporn

Academic background
- Education: Columbia University (BA); University of Michigan (MA); University of Michigan (PhD)

Barbara Ransby (born May 12, 1957) is an American writer, historian, professor, and activist. She is an elected fellow of the Society of American Historians, and holds the John D. MacArthur Chair at the University of Illinois Chicago.

== Career ==
Ransby attended Columbia University, where she graduated with a bachelor's degree in 1984, and completed her master's degree and PhD at the University of Michigan.

In 1996, she joined the faculty of University of Illinois Chicago, where she is professor of Black Studies and Gender and Women's Studies, and History at the university. Ransby was elected president of the National Women's Studies Association for a two-year term, which began in November 2016. She is a historian of the Movement for Black Lives.

Ransby's academic work has featured biographies of 20th-century black women activists Ella Baker and Eslanda Robeson. In contemporary politics, she has been executive director of a non-profit organization. Her daughter Asha Rosa Ransby-Sporn is as of 2021 a national organizing co-chair of the non-profit youth organization BYP100.

In 1995, Ransby, together with other black feminists including Angela Davis, Evelynn Hammonds and Kimberlé Crenshaw, formed an alliance called the African American Agenda 2000 to oppose Louis Farrakhan's Million Man March, out of concern that it would further black male sexism.

== Selected works ==
=== Books ===
- Ella Baker and the Black Freedom Movement: A Radical Democratic Vision (2003, UNC Press)
- Eslanda: The Large and Unconventional Life of Mrs. Paul Robeson (2013, Yale Press)
- Making All Black Lives Matter: Reimagining Freedom in the Twenty-First Century (2018, University of California Press)

=== Articles ===
- "Suffocate Black Women Voices" (1991)
