= Marian Kramer =

American civil rights, poverty, and labor activist

- Born: 1944 (age 81–82); Baton Rouge, Louisiana
- Occupations: Welfare and Civil Rights Activist; Co-chair of the National Civil Rights Union
- Organization: National Civil Rights Union
- Spouse: General Gordon Baker Jr. (1979-2014†)

Marian Kramer (born 1944 in Baton Rouge, Louisiana) is a civil rights, poverty, and labor activist based in Detroit, Michigan.

== Family and childhood ==
=== Early life ===
Kramer has been involved with the Civil Rights Movement since childhood, when she attended community meetings and rallies with family members. While studying at Southern University in Baton Rouge, Kramer further immersed herself in the Civil Rights Movement. She is the recipient of numerous awards for community service. In 2004, Kramer was awarded an Alston/Bannerman Fellowship, a fellowship for esteemed, long-time community activists of color. She was interviewed for the Global Feminisms Project on March 5, 2004.

=== Marriage and children ===
In 1979 Marian Kramer married General Gordon Baker Jr (1941-2014†), a prominent labor organizer and activist. Together they have five children.

== Activism ==
Marian Kramer has been a large part of the welfare and civil rights movements since the early 1960s. Kramer worked for the Congress of Racial Equality (CORE) as an organizer for their voter registration campaign. She currently serves as the cochair of the National Welfare Rights Union, an organization she founded with her peers.

=== Organizational Affiliations ===
- Lawyers' Committee for Civil Rights Under Law
- National Council of Negro Women
- African-American Women's Caucus
- Women of Color Caucus
- National Anti-Hunger Coalition
- National Organization for Women
- Congress of Racial Equality (CORE)
- Wayne County Welfare Rights Organization
- United Auto Workers

=== Organizations Co-Founded ===
- National Welfare Rights Union
- Black Panther Party (in Detroit, MI)
- Welfare Workers for Justice

== Publications ==
Kramer, M. (1994). Remarks on the National Welfare Rights Union. Social Justice, 21(1 (55)), 9-11.
