= Dodge Revolutionary Union Movement =

Former African-American trade union movement in the United States

Dodge Revolutionary Movement
- Abbreviation: DRUM
- Leader: General Baker
- Founded: May 1968
- Headquarters: Detroit, Michigan
- Ideology: Communism; Civil Rights; Trade Unionism; Black Power

The Dodge Revolutionary Union Movement (DRUM) was an organization of African-American workers formed in May 1968 in the Chrysler Corporation's Dodge Main assembly plant in Detroit, Michigan.

== History ==
Detroit labor activist Martin Glaberman estimated at the time that the Hamtramck plant was 70 per cent black while the union local (UAW Local 3), the plant management and lower supervision, and the Hamtramck city administration was dominated by older Polish-American workers. DRUM sought to organize black workers to obtain concessions not only from the Chrysler management, but also from the United Auto Workers. Walter Reuther and the senior leadership had been early supporters of the American Civil Rights Movement; yet in spite of their growing presence in the auto industry, African-Americans rarely rose to positions of leadership within the union.

On July 8, 1968 DRUM led a wildcat strike against conditions in the Hamtramck plant. The strike was observed by some 4,000 workers, lasted 2.5 days and prevented the production of 3,000 cars. In the subsequent Local 3 election, DRUM ran as an alternative slate. Although it did not win, the new organization drew notice for its militancy and willingness to challenge the UAW hierarchy.

More than an opportunist officialdom, the working class suffers from the conversion of the institution of the union itself into a part of the boss' apparatus. The sacred contract, once viewed as the register of the workers' gains, has become the written record of their subordination to the power of capital. The seniority system, once a defense against favoritism and arbitrary firing, has been adapted to give legal force to the white male monopoly of the better jobs. The automatic dues check-off system has removed the union entirely from any dependence on its membership. The huge treasuries, originally conceived to stockpile ammunition for class warfare, have put the unions in the banking, real estate, and insurance business. The closed shop has become the token of wholesale selfishness. In this wasteland of labor's twisted hopes, where else could redemption come than from among those whose interests were at every turn sacrificed so that another, more favored group could make its peace with the masters? Where else, indeed, but from among the black workers at the automobile manufacturing infernos of the city of Detroit?

— Inner City Voice article from October 1970

The "Revolutionary Union Movement" form of organization spread to other Detroit plants: including FRUM (Ford Revolutionary Union Movement) at the Ford River Rouge Plant, and ELRUM (Eldon Avenue Revolutionary Union Movement) at the Chrysler Eldon Avenue plant. These organizations were brought together in the League of Revolutionary Black Workers (LRBW) which formed in June 1969.

As it grew, DRUM faced a crisis of expectations. Auto workers had created an independent organization, but opinions differed about DRUM's future mission. Debates concerned whether DRUM should continue as a reform movement within the UAW, or as a dual union which would seek to replace the UAW. The LRBW eventually split between those who wanted to remain focused on the auto industry and those who wished to expand the League into a national political organization. The nationally oriented movement, led by General Baker, retained the organizational name and became associated with the New Communist Movement. By 1975, however, the plant-level organization was largely defunct. Many members had been fired, and those who stayed often joined other currents in the union reform movement, such as the United National Caucus.
