= Karl Pulotu-Endemann =

New Zealand-Samoan Justice of the Peace, mental health nurse and cultural safety advocate

Karl Pulotu-Endemann MNZM JP
- Born: Apia, Western Samoa
- Medical career
- Profession: Nurse
- Field: Mental health
- Institutions: Universal College of Learning

Karl Pulotu-Endemann is a Samoan-born, New Zealand-based academic, nurse and fa'afafine and is called by Te Ara: The Encyclopedia of New Zealand "one of New Zealand's best-known and most honoured fa'afafine".

Pulotu-Endemann was born in 1950 and moved to New Zealand as a child in 1959 for an education.

After training initially as a psychiatric nurse, Pulotu-Endemann became a health consultant on the Pacific Health issue, and created the Fonofale Model of Pacific Health has been accepted by the Mental Health Commission of New Zealand.

As an educator, Pulotu-Endemann rose to be associate-head of Manawatu Polytechnic's Nursing and Health Studies (now UCOL).

In 1990, Pulotu-Endemann became one of only two Pacifica Justice of the Peace in New Zealand.

== Selected works ==
- Pulotu-Endemann, Fuimaono Karl, and Sione Tuʼitahi. Fonofale: Model of health. Fuimaono Karl Pulotu-Endemann, 2009.
- Agnew, Francis, Fuimaono Karl Pulotu-Endemann, Gail Robinson, Tamasailau Suaalii-Sauni, Helen Warren, Amanda Wheeler, Maliaga Erick, Tevita Hingano, and Helen Schmidt-Sopoaga. "Pacific models of mental health service delivery in New Zealand (“PMMHSD”) project." Auckland: Health Research Council of New Zealand (2004).
- Crawley, Louisa, Fuimaono Karl Pulotu-Endemann, and Rosaline Tofilau Utumapu Stanley-Findlay. Strategic directions for the mental health services for Pacific Islands people. Ministry of Health, 1995.
- Pulotu-Endemann, Karl, and Paul Spoonley. "Being Samoan: Samoan ethnicity in New Zealand." New Zealand and International Migration: A digest and bibliography 2 (1992).
- Pulotu-Endemann, F. Karl, and Carmel L. Peteru. "Beyond the Paradise myth: Sexuality and identity." Tangata o te moana nui: The evolving identities of Pacific peoples in Aotearoa/New Zealand (2001): 122–136.

== Honours ==
In the 2001 New Year Honours, Pulotu-Endemann was appointed a Member of the New Zealand Order of Merit, for services to public health. He is also a sitting member of the CreativeNZ Pacific Arts Committee In 2022, he was awarded an honorary Doctor of Health degree by Massey University.
