= Dick Conway (rugby union) =

New Zealand rugby union player (1935–2022)

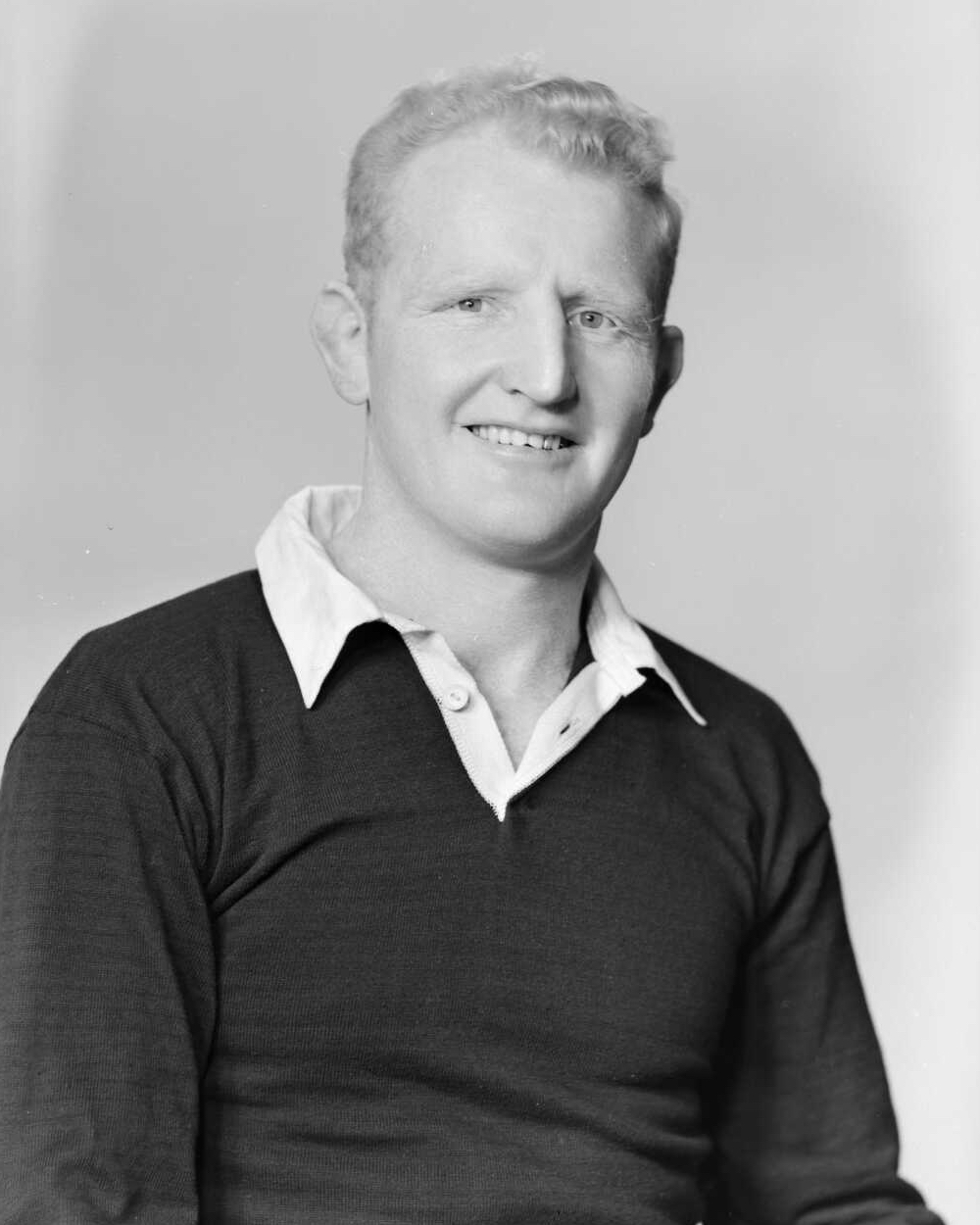
- Conway, c. 1960
- Born: Richard James Conway; 22 April 1935 Whakatāne, New Zealand
- Died: 25 May 2022 (aged 87) Whakatāne, New Zealand
- Height: 1.75 m (5 ft 9 in)
- Weight: 86 kg (190 lb)
- School: Whakatane High School
- Occupation: Carpenter

Rugby union career
- Position: Loose forward
Provincial / State sides
Years	Team	Apps	(Points)
1957–1961	Otago		
1962–1968	Bay of Plenty	72	
International career
Years	Team	Apps	(Points)
1959–1965	New Zealand	10	(3)

Richard James Conway (22 April 1935 – 25 May 2022), also known as Red Conway, was a New Zealand rugby union player. He played ten tests for the New Zealand national team, the All Blacks, between 1959 and 1965 at number 8 or flanker. In 1960, he had a finger amputated so he could take part in a tour of Australia and South Africa.

== Early life ==
Conway was born in Whakatāne on 22 April 1935, and educated at Whakatane High School, where he played as a hooker. As well as playing rugby, Conway played softball as a catcher in the summer, and represented Rotorua in 1956.

== Rugby union career ==
Conway was small for a loose forward, standing 1.75 metres (5 ft 9 in) tall and weighing 85 kilograms (187 lb), but was known as a dynamic tackler.

=== Provincial ===
Conway made his provincial debut for Otago, where he spent several winters, in 1957. He went on to play 72 games for Bay of Plenty from 1962 to 1968, and was captain of the team.

=== International ===
Conway debuted for the All Blacks in 1959, playing the second test against the touring British Lions. The first test had resulted in a New Zealand win, but was described as "New Zealand's saddest victory" by some in the press due to the Lions' outscoring the home team four tries to none.

A persistent finger injury incurred from playing as a softball catcher put Conway's 1960 tour of South Africa in doubt. The damage occurred to his third finger on his right hand after it was broken while trying to catch a foul ball. After the break mended the finger retained a kink and he was told by a specialist that if he kept playing rugby the finger would keep breaking. To keep his spot on the tour Conway decided have the finger amputated after the final selection trial. He was not selected for the All Blacks for five years following the tour until 1965, when he was recalled for four tests against South Africa. He played an important role in securing a 3–1 series victory. That was his last game for the All Blacks, although he did play in a "The Rest" team against them the next year.

== Later life and death ==
Conway worked as a carpenter, and he coached rugby at club level in Whakatāne during the 1970s.

He died in Whakatāne on 25 May 2022, aged 87.
