= John Head (peace activist) =

New Zealand teacher and activist (1927–2007)

John Head QSM
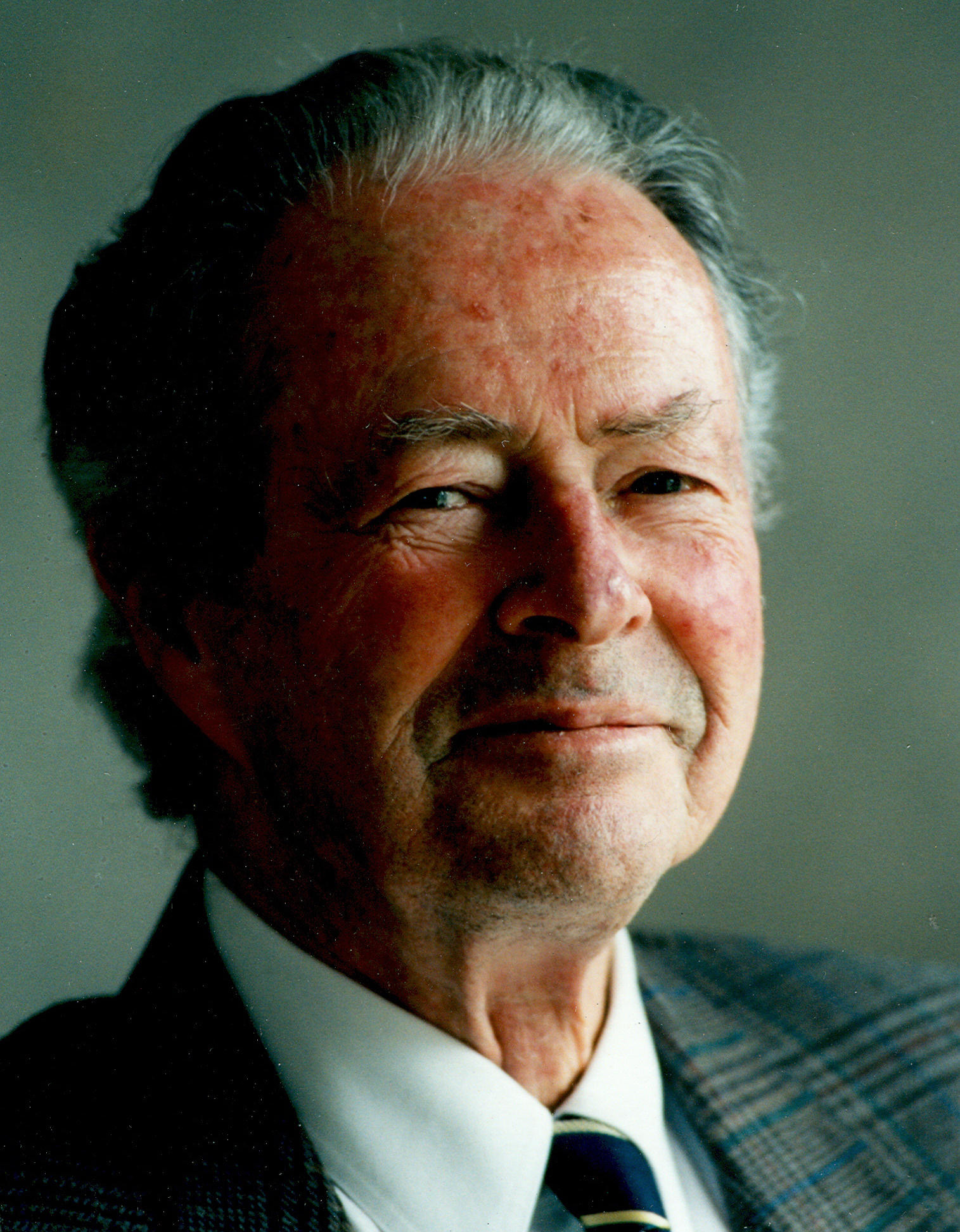
- Born: John Vernon Head; 24 March 1927; Napier, New Zealand
- Died: 4 February 2007 (aged 79); Wellington, New Zealand
- Occupation: Schoolteacher
- Known for: Anti-landmine campaigner
- Spouse: Avril Nell Pope (m. 1949)
- Children: 4

John Vernon Head QSM (24 March 1927 – 4 February 2007) was a New Zealand peace activist. After a 40-year teaching career, he founded the New Zealand Campaign Against Landmines (CALM) in 1993. He boosted New Zealand's awareness of the scale of worldwide landmine problems and his efforts were the catalyst for the Anti-Personnel Mines Prohibition Act 1988, which became New Zealand law early in 1999.

== Early life and family ==
Head was born in Napier, New Zealand, on 24 March 1927, the adopted son of Gilbert Charles Head and Marjorie Cecil Bretherton of Napier. At age 16, he discovered that he was adopted when he accidentally discovered his birth certificate which showed his name as John Vernon Peillon. Head was educated at Parkvale Primary School, Hastings High School, Rotorua High School, and Whakatane High School, where he was dux in 1943. Boy Scouts was an important early life influence culminating in receiving the highest scouting award of King's Scout.

Head married fellow teacher Avril Nell Pope (great-granddaughter of the educationalist James Henry Pope) in Hāwera on 31 December 1949. They had four children—two boys and two girls—one of the girls dying at an early age.

In 1988, at age 61, Head met his birth mother, Agnes Isobel "Nessie" Rolls (née Peillon), for the first time. She was the granddaughter of a French goldminer, Paul Peillon, originally from near Lyon, who was killed in the explosion at the Brunner Mine disaster in 1896. Head undertook extensive research of his family history and made four trips to Lyon as part of this research. Away from work and his pacifist activities he was a keen gardener, walker and traveller.

== Military service ==
Head attended the Royal Military College, Duntroon in Australia achieving the rank of captain in the New Zealand Army. He did not see active service, as World War II ended before he graduated. At aged 16, he was the youngest New Zealand cadet ever accepted into the school. He continued for 12 years as a commissioned officer in the Territorial Force of the New Zealand Army Reserves.

== Teaching career ==
Head attended Auckland Teachers' College in 1947 and Ardmore Teachers' College in 1948. At Ardmore in its foundation year, he was elected student executive treasurer.

Over a period of 40 years, Head taught at a number of New Zealand schools and was principal of the following schools:

- Orere School, Auckland;
- Matau School, Taranaki;
- Lepperton School, Taranaki;
- Merrilands School, New Plymouth;
- Cashmere Avenue School, Wellington, where he was the first principal after it was established as a full primary school in 1968.;
- Papakowhai School, Porirua, where he was foundation principal from 1976 to 1980;
- Newlands School, Wellington, from 1980 until his retirement in 1984.

He was also an exchange teacher at Benson School in Croydon, London in 1961, and was Education Officer on Niue in 1965–66.

Head was a keen photographer, and in 1976 he and his son Geoff visited Chile to make three audiovisual programmes of family life in that country for the Department of Education, which were used in New Zealand primary schools' geography studies.

== Commission for the Environment ==
After retirement from teaching in 1984, Head took up a position as consultant for the New Zealand Commission for the Environment, and in 1986 wrote Landscape in the School Environment, A Guide to ways of Improving School Grounds.

== Activism ==
Head spent much of his retirement years working for the ideals of peace and disarmament. His anti-war principles led him into demonstrations, most recently against the United States invasion of Iraq. Head worked in groups supporting East Timor and democracy in Burma. He was interested in Niue, where he lived for two years in the 1960s, and was a support to Niueans living in New Zealand.

Head was the founding Convenor of the New Zealand Campaign Against Landmines, associated with the International Campaign to Ban Landmines. He was concerned by the use of cluster bombs and nerve gas as well as anti-personnel mines and horrified by the amount of funding available for countries to develop weapons of war with little regard for humanitarian consequences. His opposition to all such weapons grew during 15 years in the Territorial Army after World War II. Until Head began campaigning, officials and humanitarian NGOs in New Zealand were relatively oblivious to the scale of the impact of landmines on innocent civilian populations in war-torn countries.

In 1993, paying his own way, as he often did throughout his leadership of CALM, Head attended the first international NGO conference in London to seek information and an idea of a role New Zealand could play. Through his membership of the United Nations Association and the National Consultative Committee on Disarmament, CALM was founded in New Zealand in September 1993, the second country in the world to have a national landmine organisation. It brought together the support of many influential NGOs such as Red Cross, World Vision and Oxfam. Early on, he had the support of the Foreign Affairs Ministry. He also found the army was not antagonistic and there was much public approval of his cause.

Head organised the visit of Jody Williams from the International Campaign to Ban Landmines (ICBL) to New Zealand in late November 1993, and held a press luncheon and public lecture for her in Wellington and organised several meetings for her with media in Auckland.

In 1996, after years of well organised effort by CALM, New Zealand ceased the operational use of landmines and in 1997 signed the Ottawa Convention to which 152 nations are now signatories. Head travelled extensively assisting the international landmines campaign. He was a major organiser for a CALM conference in Fiji in 1997, which spread the landmine issue to South Pacific nations. He was a key speaker in Moscow for the launch of the organisation there in 1998. He stood down from leadership of CALM in 1998.

Head served as president of the Wellington Branch of the United Nations Association of New Zealand, and president of the Wellington Branch of the New Zealand Educational Institute.

== Recognition ==
On 3 December 1998, MP Graham Kelly expressed a debt of gratitude during the Parliamentary Debate for the Anti-Personnel Mines Prohibition Bill 1988, for Head's contribution:

"I conclude with one other remark---that is, to acknowledge and put on record the thanks of all New Zealanders to John Head, who is in the House today. He chaired the New Zealand Campaign Against Landmines. He told me only a short while ago that it has been an almost full-time job since 1992.

We owe him a debt of gratitude, not only the people of New Zealand, not only Parliament, not only the organisations that he has convinced to support the campaign, but those women, children, and men in other countries who have been saved as a result of the activities that have started, and who will avoid being maimed or killed in the future.

I know that he has had extensive travel overseas in his lobbying with international organisations, and he has made a major commitment in his retirement. I thank him for the contribution he has made. All New Zealanders will be most grateful to him."

Head received a personal letter from Diana, Princess of Wales dated 3 June 1997. She wrote, "...it is only with the support of people such as yourself, that this terrible issue will finally be brought to a successful conclusion".

In the 2001 New Year Honours, Head was awarded the Queen's Service Medal for public services.

Nobel Peace Laureate Jody Williams delivered the "John V. Head Memorial Lecture" on 19 February 2008 to honour Head's legacy.
