= Errol Brathwaite =

New Zealand writer

Errol Brathwaite MNZM
- Brathwaite in 1989
- Born: Errol Freeman Brathwaite; 3 April 1924; Waipukurau, New Zealand
- Died: 4 December 2005 (aged 81); Christchurch, New Zealand
- Writing career
- Genres: Historical fiction and non-fiction; Travel guides; Radio plays

Errol Freeman Brathwaite MNZM (3 April 1924 – 4 December 2005) was a New Zealand author.

== Biography ==
Born in Waipukurau in 1924, Brathwaite was educated at Timaru Boys' High School. He served in the Royal New Zealand Air Force as an air gunner in the Pacific in the latter part of World War II. He married Alison Whyte at St John's Church, Latimer Square, in Christchurch on 20 March 1948 and after a period in the army he began working in advertising.

In 1959, Brathwaite wrote his first book, Fear in the Night, a novel set in the Pacific during the Second World War, in which a New Zealand air crew try to repair their bomber and get it airborne again before an approaching Japanese patrol arrives. He became a full-time writer. The three novels The Flying Fish, The Needle's Eye and The Evil Day, written between 1964 and 1967, are a trilogy set during the New Zealand Wars of the nineteenth century. He wrote over 30 books, including many travel guides to New Zealand, and numerous radio plays.

In the 2001 New Year Honours, Brathwaite was appointed a Member of the New Zealand Order of Merit, for services to literature.

Brathwaite died in Christchurch in 2005 and was buried in Avonhead Cemetery.

== Books ==
=== Novels ===
- Fear in the Night 1959
- An Affair of Men 1961
- Long Way Home 1964
- The Flying Fish 1964
- The Needle's Eye 1965
- The Evil Day 1967
- Morning Flight 1970
- The Flame Box 1978

=== Non-fiction ===
- The Companion Guide to the North Island of New Zealand 1970
- The Companion Guide to the South Island of New Zealand 1972
- The Beauty of New Zealand 1974
- New Zealand and Its People 1974
- Except the Lord Build the House 1977
- Historic New Zealand 1980
- Sixty Red Nightcaps and Other Curiosities of New Zealand History 1980
- Wild New Zealand 1981
- The Companion Guide to Westland 1981
- Dunedin Photography 1981
- The Beauty of Waikato-Bay of Plenty: Incorporating Rotorua & Taupo 1981
- The Companion Guide to Otago, Southland and Stewart Island 1982
- The Beauty of New Zealand's South Island 1982
- The Beauty of New Zealand's North Island 1982
- Pilot on the Run: The Epic Escape from Occupied France of Flight Sergeant L.S.M. (Chalky) White RNZAF 1986
- Christchurch, North and Mid Canterbury 1988
- A Portrait of New Zealand 1988
- South Canterbury: Timaru, Mt Cook & the Mackenzie Country 1989
- We'll Be Home for Christmas: The Second World War as Seen Through the Eyes of Ordinary New Zealanders Who Served in the Royal New Zealand Air Force (edited) 1994
