= Patricia Hook =

New Zealand nurse

Sister Patricia Hook DCNZM
- Born: Patricia Mary Hook; 4 August 1921; Christchurch, New Zealand
- Died: 12 January 2010 (aged 88); Auckland, New Zealand
- Occupations: Nurse; hospital administrator

Sister Patricia Mary Hook DCNZM (4 August 1921 – 12 January 2010) was a New Zealand Catholic sister, nurse and hospital administrator.

== Biography ==
Hook was born in Christchurch on 4 August 1921, the daughter of Mary and Stanley Hook. She grew up in Oamaru, where she was educated at St Patrick's School and St Thomas's Girls' Secondary School.

During World War II, Hook served in the New Zealand Women's Auxiliary Air Force as a radio operator. She was stationed at RNZAF Central Group Headquarters in Wellington, and was granted a commission in 1943.

After the war, Hook began training as a nurse at Mater Misericordiae Hospital (now Mercy Hospital) in Epsom, Auckland, and not long after entered the convent, although she initially resisted her calling. She nursed at the Mater from 1949, and was the hospital administrator from 1964 to 1979. She established the Mercy Spiritual Life Centre in Epsom in 1983, and served as director until 1990. She was then a member of the management team and was spiritual director at St Mary's Convent in Ponsonby.

Hook was vice president of the Nurses Association, chair of the National Nursing Services Committee for three years, and president of the Private Hospitals Association for two years.

In the 2001 New Year Honours, Hook was appointed a Distinguished Companion of the New Zealand Order of Merit, for services to nursing and the community. When the New Zealand government reintroduced titular honours in 2009, she declined redesignation as a Dame Companion.

Hook died on 12 January 2010, and was buried at Waikaraka Cemetery in Onehunga.
