= Whakatāne High School =

Location
- Goulstone Road; Whakatāne, 3120; New Zealand; 37.9621°S 176.9854°E

Information
- Other name: WHS
- Funding type: State
- Motto: Kia Whakatane Au I Ahau ("I will act the part of a man")
- Opened: 1920 (As Whakatane District High School)
- Founder: William Birss
- Ministry of Education Institution no.: 144
- Dean: Year 9: CJ van Schalkwyk, Ngaire Ranapia; Year 10: Rachelle Owen-Cooper, James "Jim" Hagger; Year 11: Julia Blakeway, Kyle MacFarlane; Year 12: Andie Eves; Year 13: Aaron Hurley
- Principal: Peter Barsdell
- Years offered: 9–13
- Gender: Co-educational
- Enrolment: 1,235 (July 2026)
- Hours in school day: 6 hours and 25 minutes
- Houses: Kauri, Rimu, Totara, Matai
- Colours: Black; Gold
- Slogan: Challenging Students to Achieve
- Socio-economic decile: 4K
- Website: www.whakatanehigh.school.nz

Whakatāne High School is a secondary school located in the town of Whakatāne, New Zealand. As of 2025, the school has a roll of over 1,200 students and aims to offer every student an equal opportunity to succeed with strong values around responsibility, respect and achievement. Whakatāne High School has a 100-year history as a co-educational public high school, opening in 1920 as Whakatane District High School, becoming a full high school in 1950. The school held its centennial on 2–3 April 2021, postponed from 2020.

== History ==
Whakatāne High School is over a century old, opening in 1920 as Whakatane District High School, becoming a full high school in 1950. In 1973, as the population of Whakatāne neared 10,000, Trident High School was opened.

== Facilities and buildings ==
The school consists of a field, gymnasium (a separate gymnastics building operated by the local Gymnastics Club lies next to it), school & student office, Careers Centre, the Barclay Hall, a library (named in November 2011 after New Zealand author Margaret Mahy, who went to Whakatāne High School for a period of time), and numerous buildings split into blocks including: N block (Mainly used for Math and Computer sciences), T Block (Mainly used for Technology), B Block (Mainly for English, Social Studies and related subjects), A block (Multiple subjects including Languages and Health), C Block (Mainly for art and related subjects) and L Block (Mainly for science and related subjects).

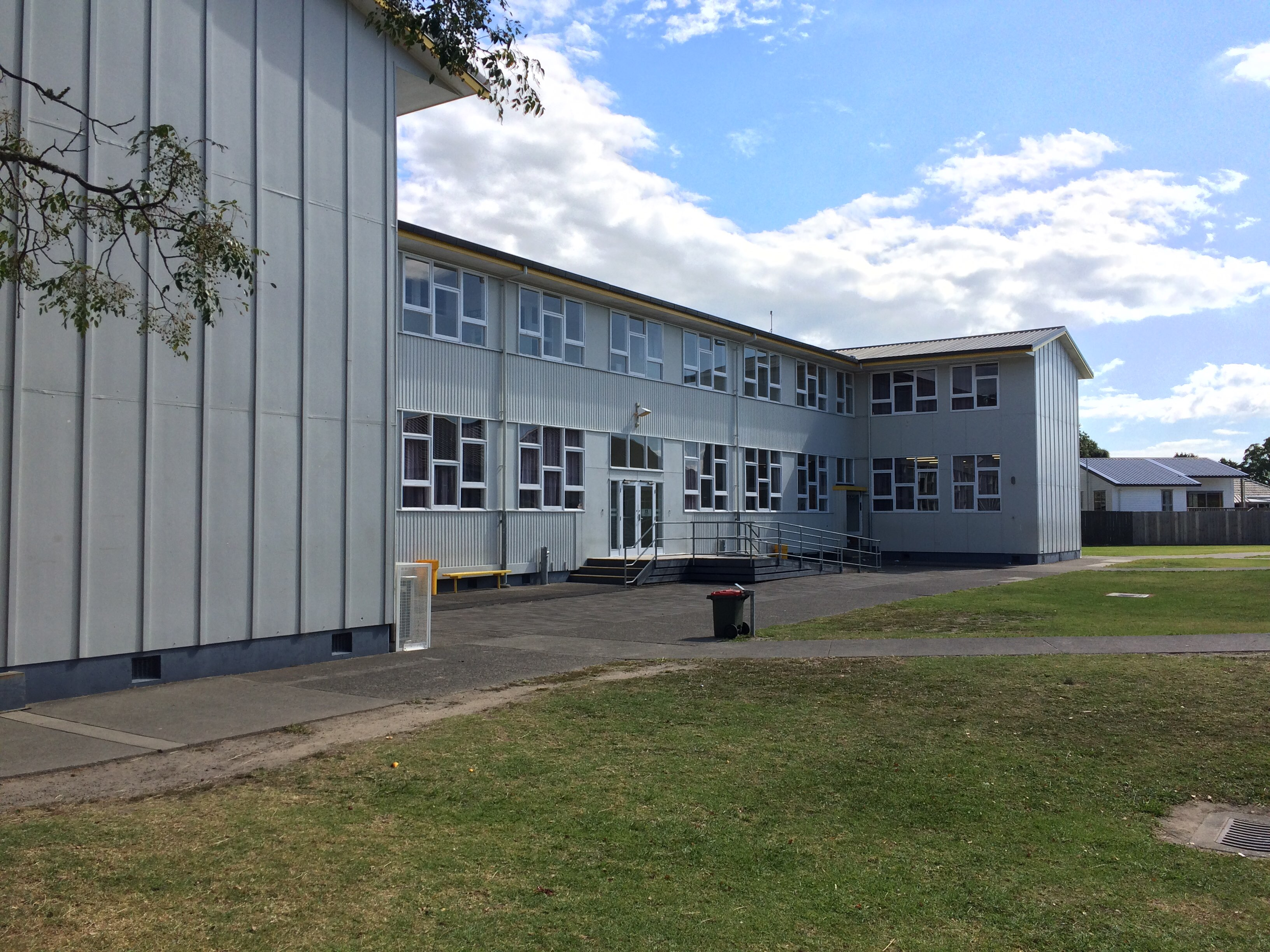
The N block

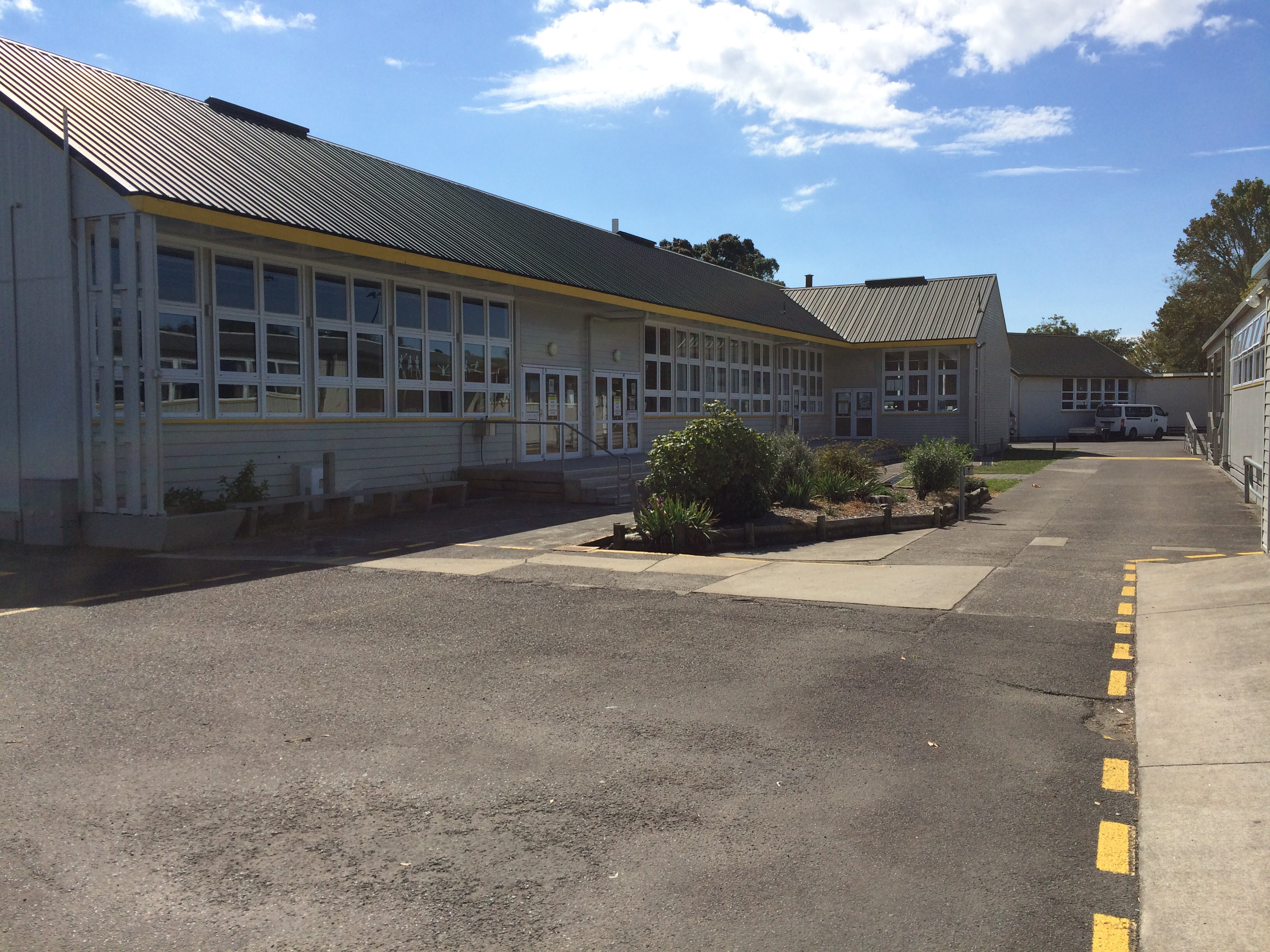
The L block

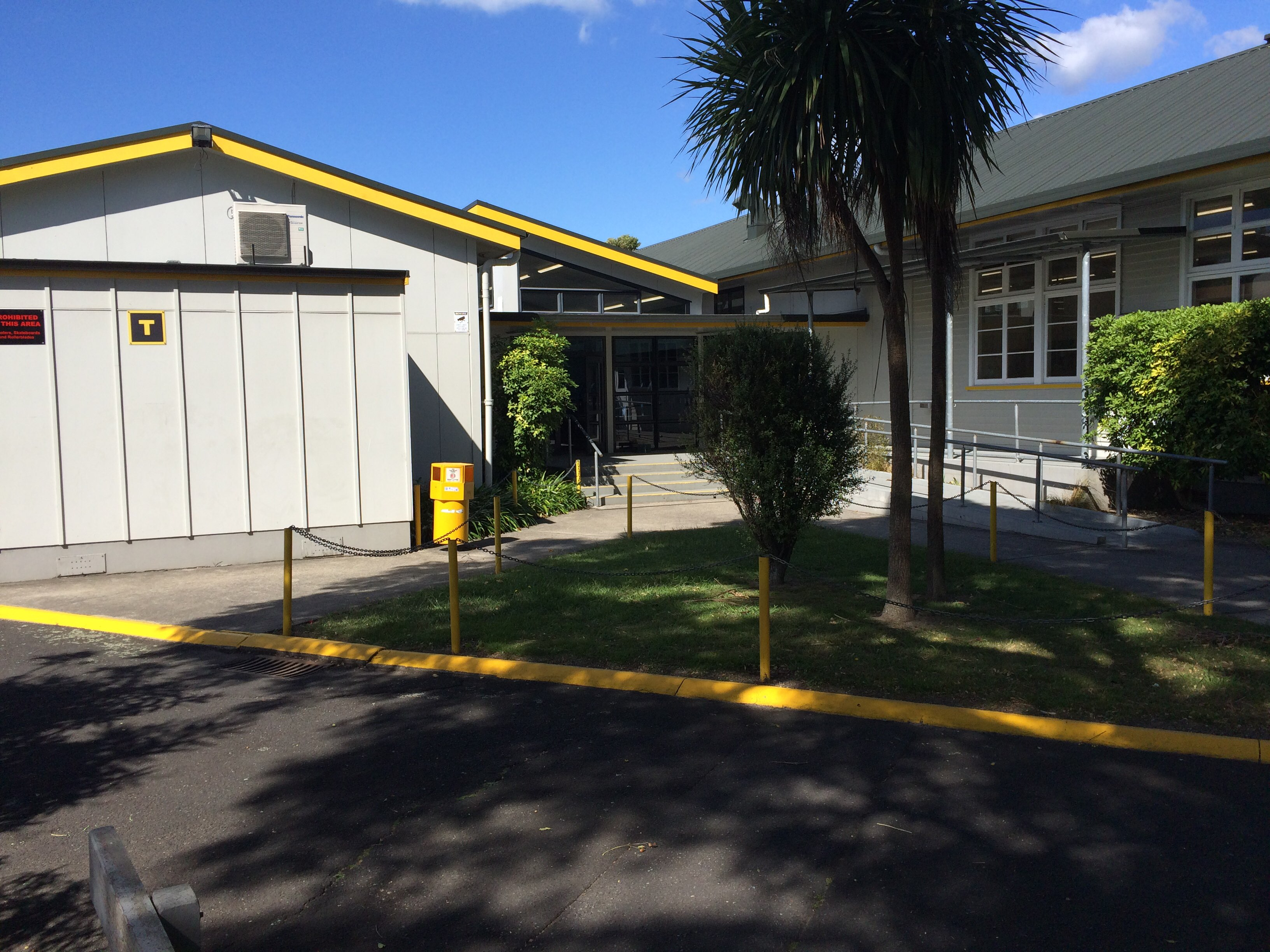
The H block

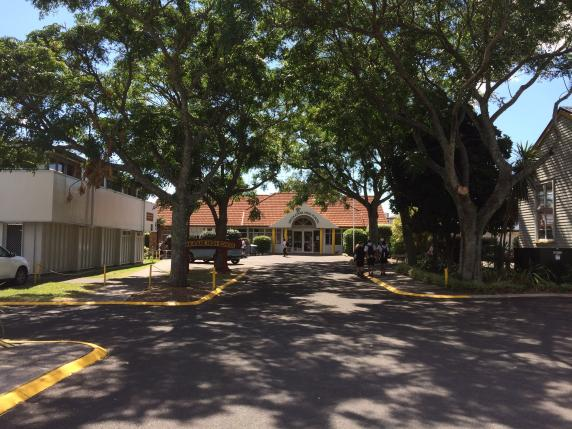
The main office viewed from Goulstone Road.

== Students ==
As of the 1st of July 2023, the total school roll was 1067 students. 62.76% of the students are European / Pākehā, 46.33% are Māori, 2.53% are Pacific, 4.98% identify as Asian, 0.87% are classified as MELAA, and 1.22% are registered as Other. There are 39 international students as of the first of July, 2023.

== Houses ==
Students at Whakatāne High School are split into one of four houses. Each house is named after a tree that is native to New Zealand. Students compete in school-related sporting and cultural events to win points for their house. At the end of the year, the house with the largest number of points is named champion for that year. The houses are represented by a colour and are listed below:

- Matai
- Kauri
- Totara
- Rimu

== Notable alumni ==
- Jack Brodrick, New Zealand rugby league international, Māori All Black, NZ Māori rugby league team player
- Lisa Carrington, Canoe Sprint World Champion, Olympic gold medalist
- Richard James Conway, New Zealand rugby union player
- Karen Hanlen, Oceania mountain bike champion
- John Vernon Head QSM, anti-landmines activist
- Toni Jeffs, New Zealand swimmer
- Jozef Klaassen, Member of Nederlands Olympic Eight at 2012 London Games
- Jaimee Lovett, New Zealand canoeist
- Margaret Mahy, author
- Benji Marshall, rugby league player
- Noel Mills, former New Zealand rower, Olympic silver medalist
- Ian Shearer, former National MP
- Brett Sinkinson, rugby union player
- Paul Steel, New Zealand squash player
- Sir Alan Stewart, founding vice-chancellor, Massey University
- Jon-Paul Tobin, New Zealand windsurfer
- Nathan Twaddle, world champion rower and Olympic bronze medalist
- Wybo Veldman, former New Zealand rower, Olympic gold medalist
- Stacey Waaka, New Zealand rugby union player
