= 2001 New Year Honours (New Zealand) =

Annual awards for New Zealanders

- Previous: 2000 Queen's Birthday Honours; Next: 2001 Special Honours
- Type: New Zealand royal honours: New Zealand Order of Merit; Queen's Service Order; Queen's Service Medal
- Date: 30 December 2000
- Country: New Zealand
- Total recipients: 187

The 2001 New Year Honours in New Zealand were appointments by Elizabeth II in her right as Queen of New Zealand, on the advice of the New Zealand government, to various orders and honours to reward and highlight good works by New Zealanders, and to celebrate the passing of 2000 and the beginning of 2001. They were announced on 30 December 2000.

The recipients of honours are listed here as they were styled before their new honour.

== New Zealand Order of Merit ==
=== Principal Companion (PCNZM) ===
Emeritus Professor Lloyd George Geering CBE – of Wellington. For services to religious studies.

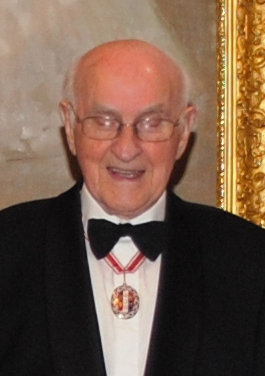
Lloyd Geering

=== Distinguished Companion (DCNZM) ===
- Jocelyn Barbara Fish CBE JP – of Hamilton. For services to women and the community.
- The Right Honourable Thomas Munro Gault – of Auckland. For services as a judge of the Court of Appeal.
- Sister Patricia Mary Hook – of Auckland. For services to nursing and the community.
- Professor Alan Francis Mark CBE – of Dunedin. For services to conservation.
- Colin Earl Meads MBE – of Te Kūiti. For services to rugby and the community.
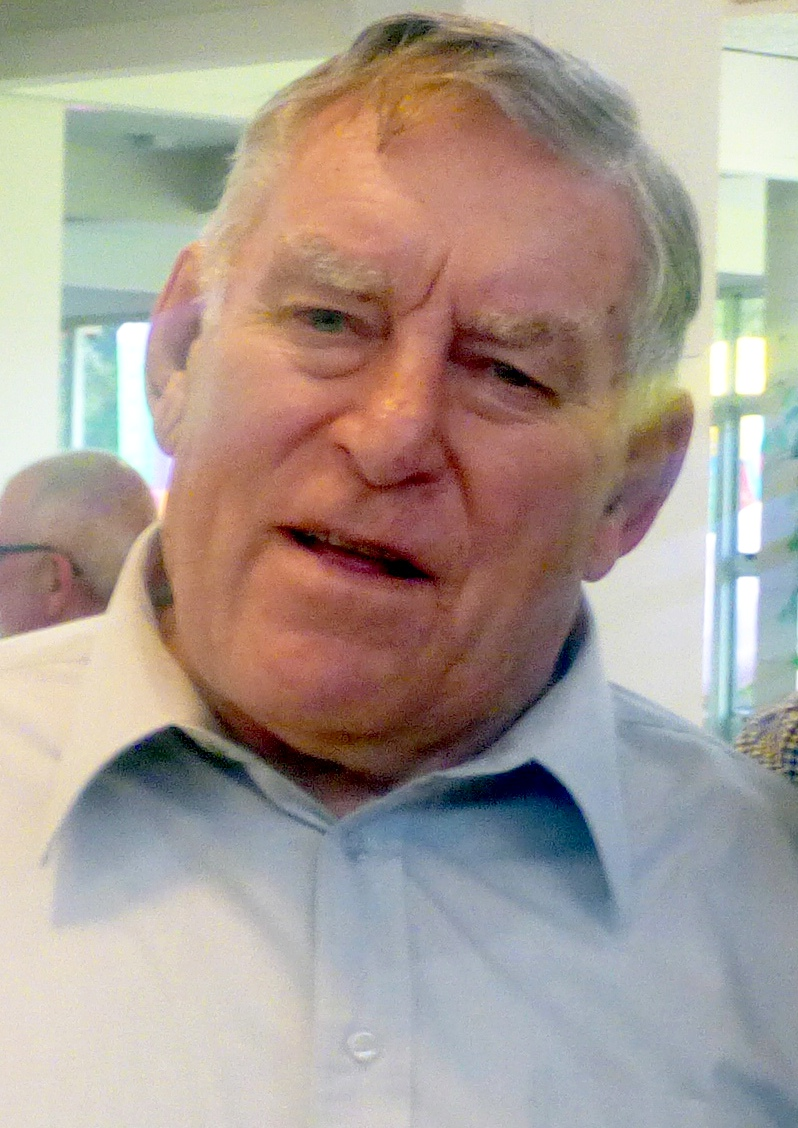
Colin Meads

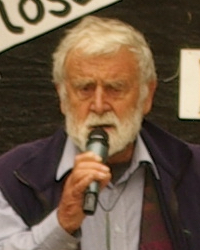
Alan Mark

=== Companion (CNZM) ===
- Jill Edwina Amos JP – of Auckland. For services to the community.
- Druiscilla Kapu Barrett – of Whangārei. For services to Māori and the community.
- Dr Allan Gordon Cumming QSO – of Palmerston North. For services to medicine, health administration and the community.
- Professor Mason Harold Durie – of Feilding. For services to Māori.
- Dr John Norman Harré – of Auckland. For services to education.
- The Honourable (Cedric) Russell Marshall – of Wellington. For public services.
- Dorothy Frances Meyer – of North Shore City. For services to women.
- Richard Frederick Nottage – of Wellington. For services as Secretary of Foreign Affairs and Trade, 1991–1999.
- Associate Professor Peter Robert Skelton – of Christchurch. For services to environmental law.
- Iritana Te Rangi Tāwhiwhirangi MBE – of Featherston. For services to Māori education.
- Anthony Ernest Walton – of Auckland. For services to the deaf.
- Professor Albert Wendt – of Auckland. For services to literature.
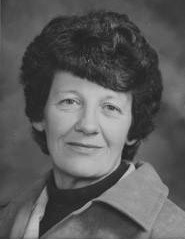
Jill Amos

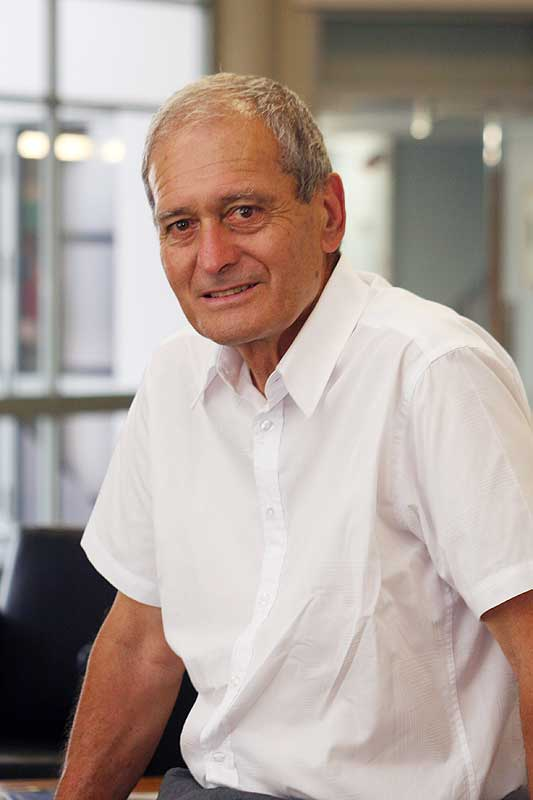
Mason Durie

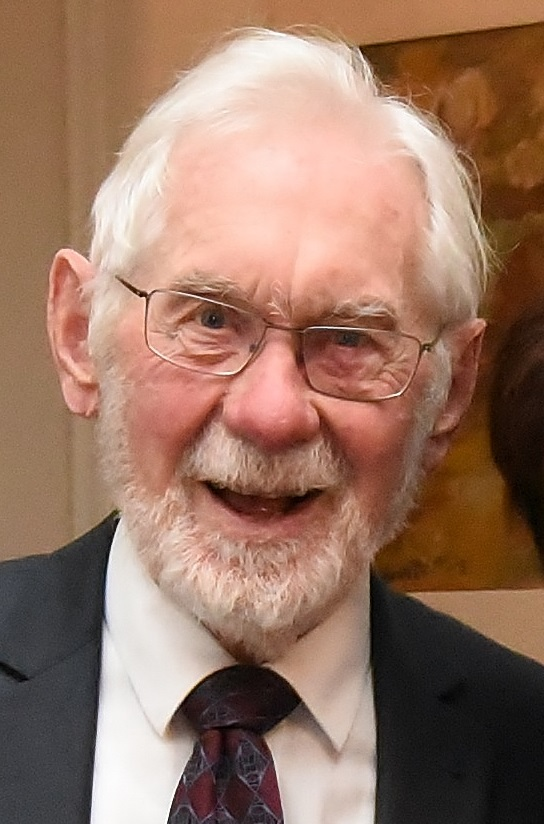
Russell Marshall

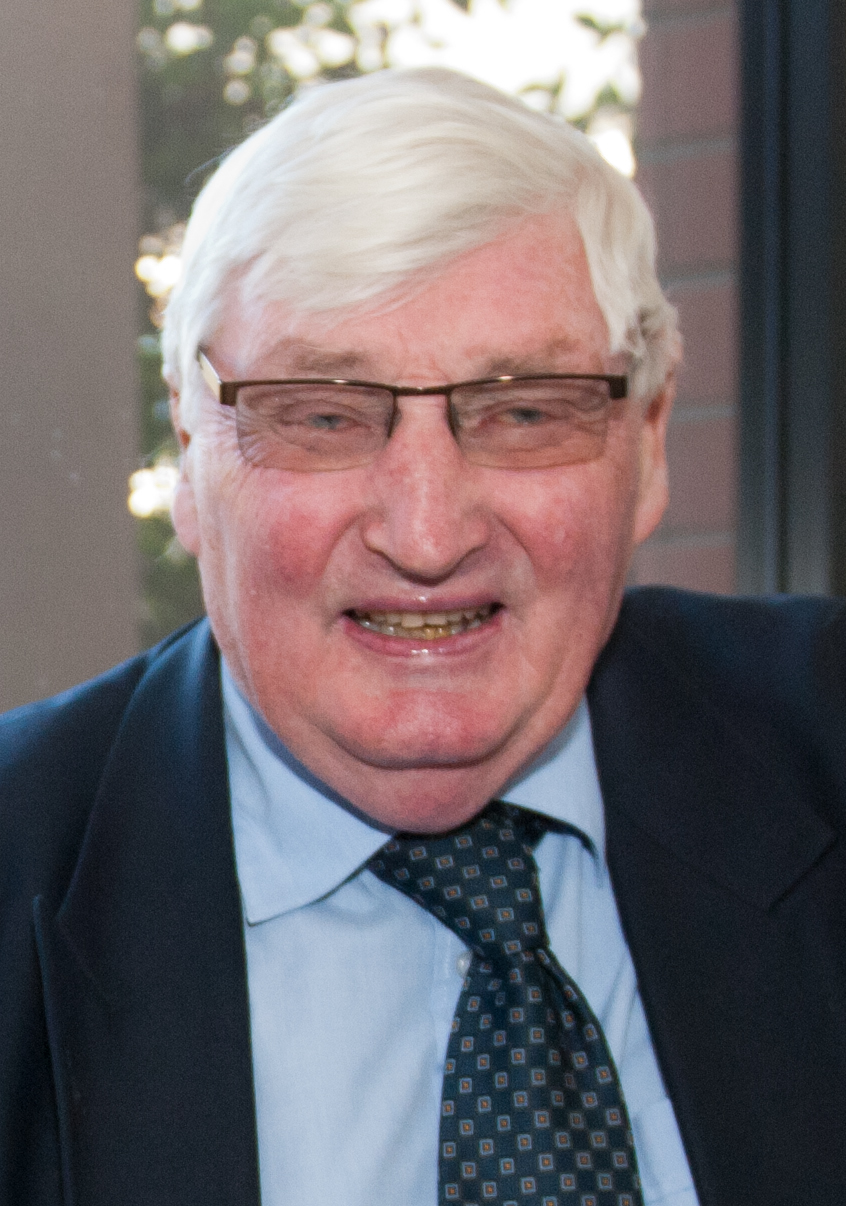
Peter Skelton

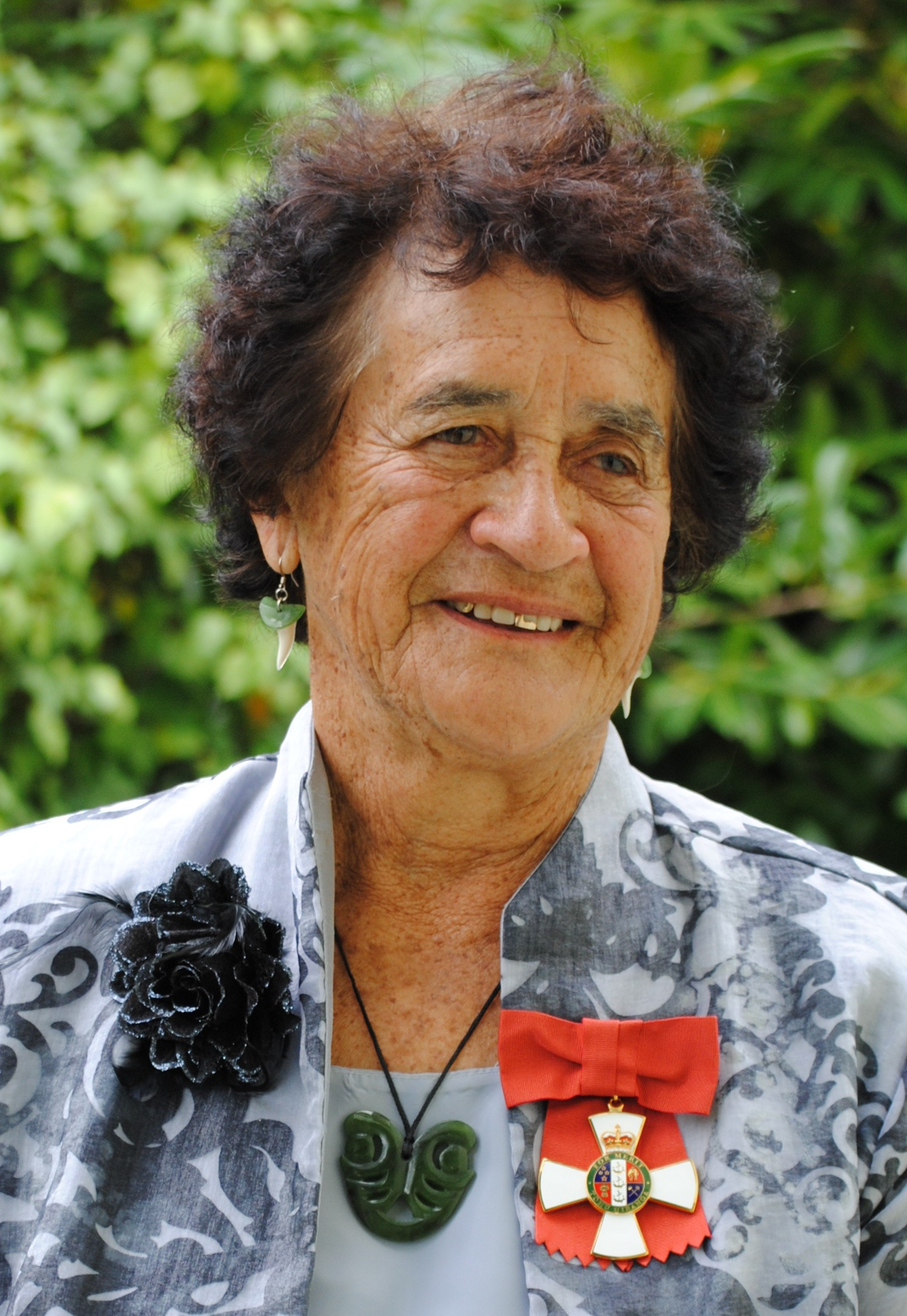
Iritana Tāwhiwhirangi

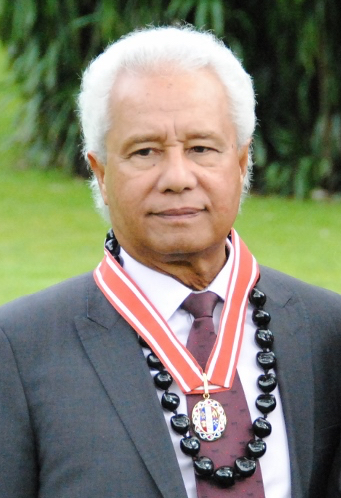
Albert Wendt

=== Officer (ONZM) ===
- John Stanley Body – of Wellington. For services to music, photography and education.
- Riwia Brown – of Paekākāriki. For services to theatre and film.
- Dorothy Quita Buchanan – of Eastbourne. For services to music.
- Barry Vickerman Cleavin – of Christchurch. For services to the arts.
- Candis Eileen Craven – of Auckland. For services to health education.
- Dr Catherine Frances (Kate) Dewes – of Christchurch. For services to the peace movement.
- Graeme Dingle MBE – of Leigh. For services to youth.
- Emeritus Professor Robert Wallace Ellis – of Auckland. For services to fine arts.
- Walter Fowlie – of Pātea. For services to mountaineering.
- Leigh Helen Gibbs – of Gisborne. For services to netball.
- Gaewyn Elizabeth Griffiths – of Auckland. For services to education.
- Air Commodore John Henry Staples Hamilton MVO – Royal New Zealand Air Force.
- Dr Michael David Henry Holdaway – of Dunedin. For services to children and medical research.
- Richard John Hubbard – of Auckland. For services to business and the community.
- Lorna Ani McIntosh – of Auckland. For services to commerce and the community.
- Dorothy Catherine Matthews – of Nelson. For services to local-body and community affairs.
- John Bentley Morrison – of Wellington. For services to the arts.
- Garry Peter Nash – of Auckland. For services to glass art.
- Patricia Katherine Payne – of Roxburgh. For services to opera and the community.
- Professor Emeritus James Ernest Ritchie – of Raglan. For services to the Māori people and education.
- Gerald Ryan – of Auckland. For services to racing, rugby league and the community.
- Sally Mavis Sloman – of Auckland. For services to opera.
- Jane Ann Thomson – of Dunedin. For services to literature.
- Robert Norman Waddell – of Cambridge. For services to rowing.
- James Hay Wallace – of Auckland. For services to the arts. (Note: In 2023, Wallace's name was erased from the register of the New Zealand Order of Merit.)

Additional

- Acting Lieutenant Colonel John Christopher Flanagan – Corps of Royal New Zealand Engineers.
- Lieutenant Colonel Gordon Kyle Milward – of Carterton; Royal New Zealand Infantry Regiment.

Honorary

- Fatu Akelei Feu'u (Poutasi Falealili) – of Auckland. For services to art.
- Gerd le Bell – of Egestorf, Federal Republic of Germany. For services to New Zealand interests in Germany.
- Ikuo Matsui – of Hokkaido, Japan. For services to New Zealand interests in Japan.
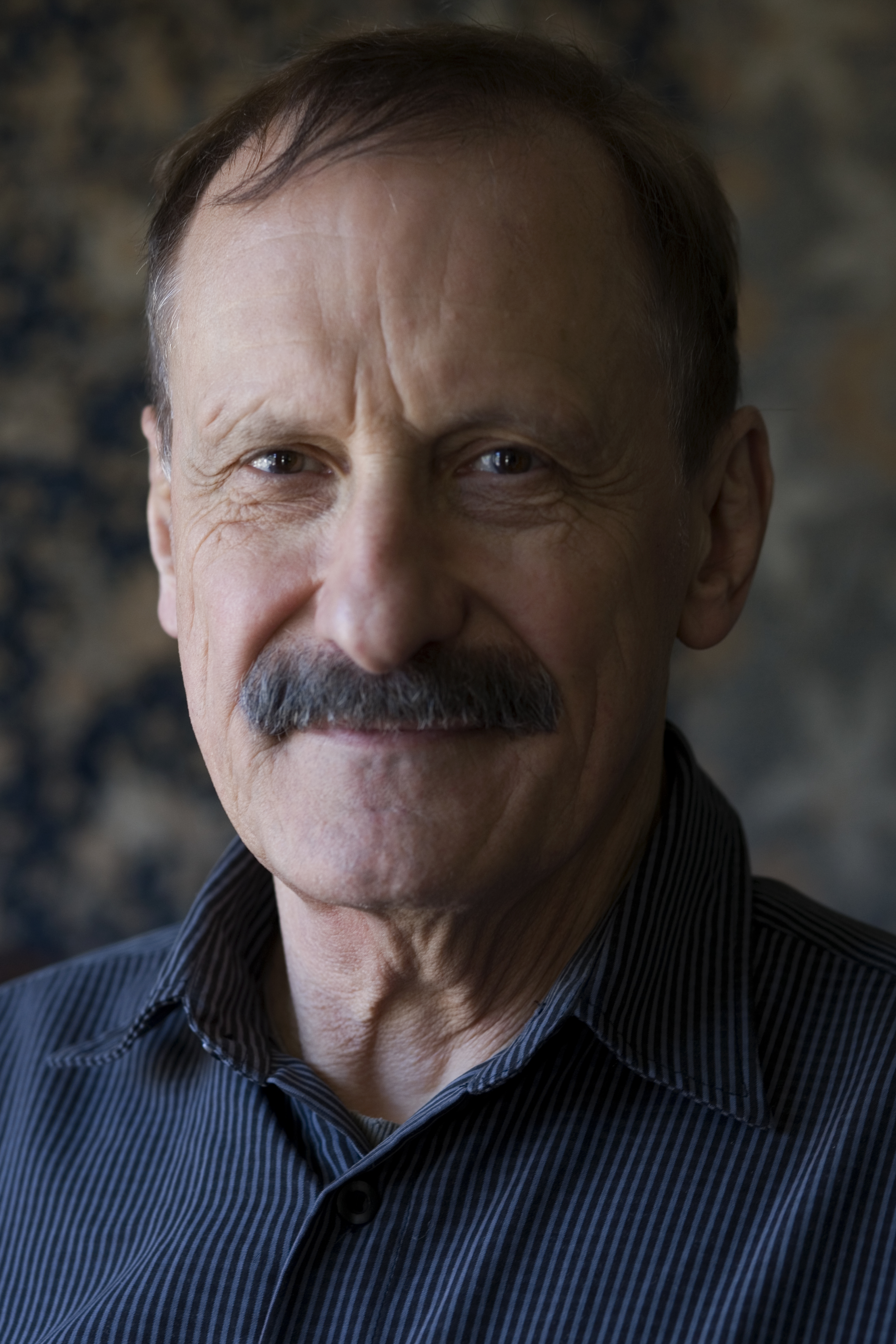
Jack Body

Barry Cleavin

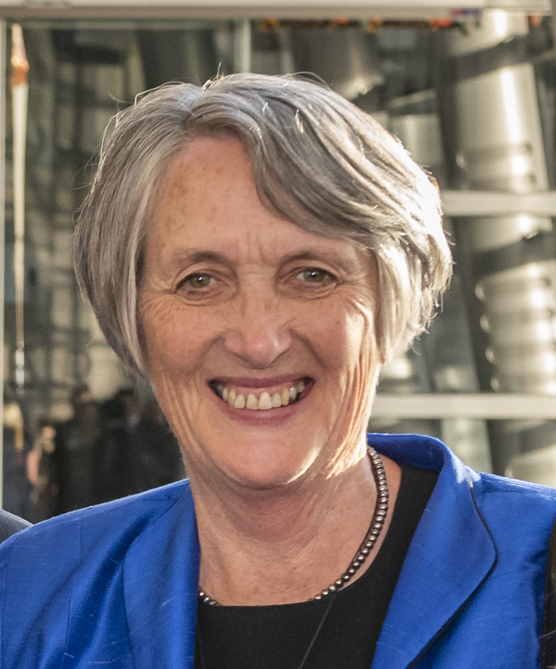
Kate Dewes

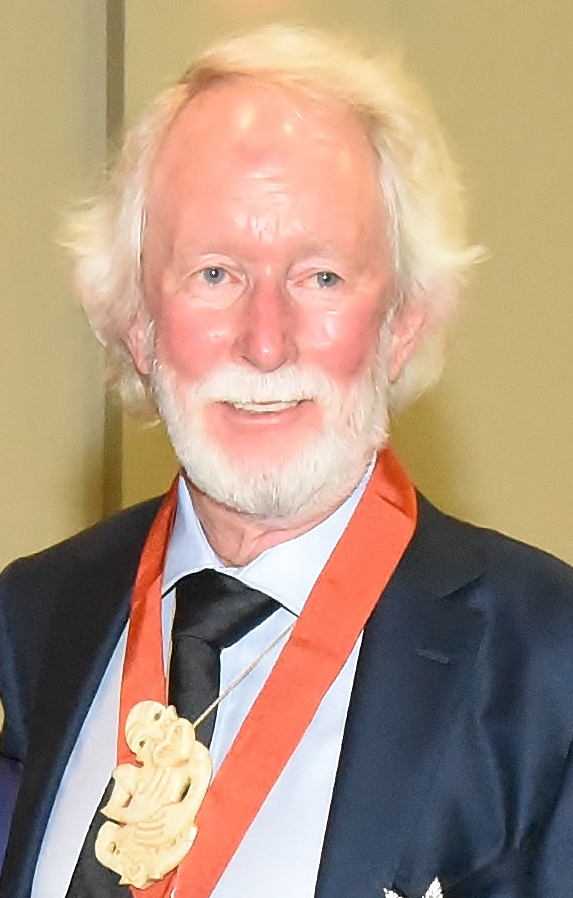
Graeme Dingle

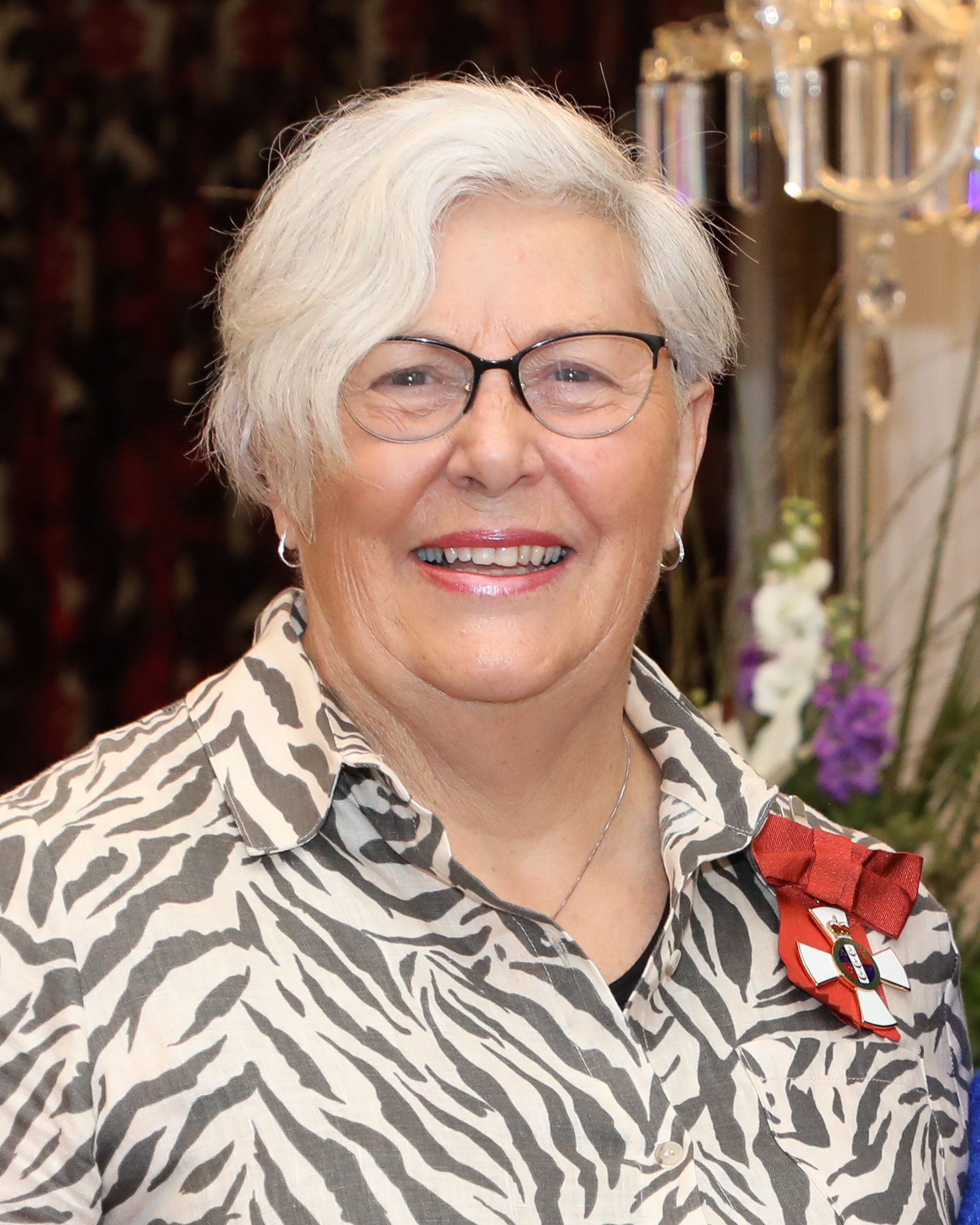
Leigh Gibbs

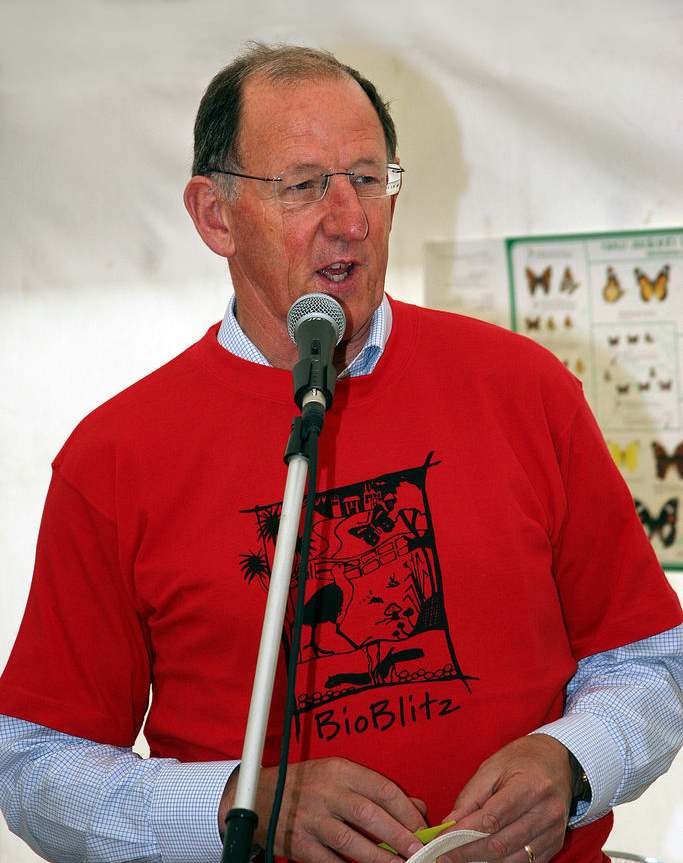
Dick Hubbard

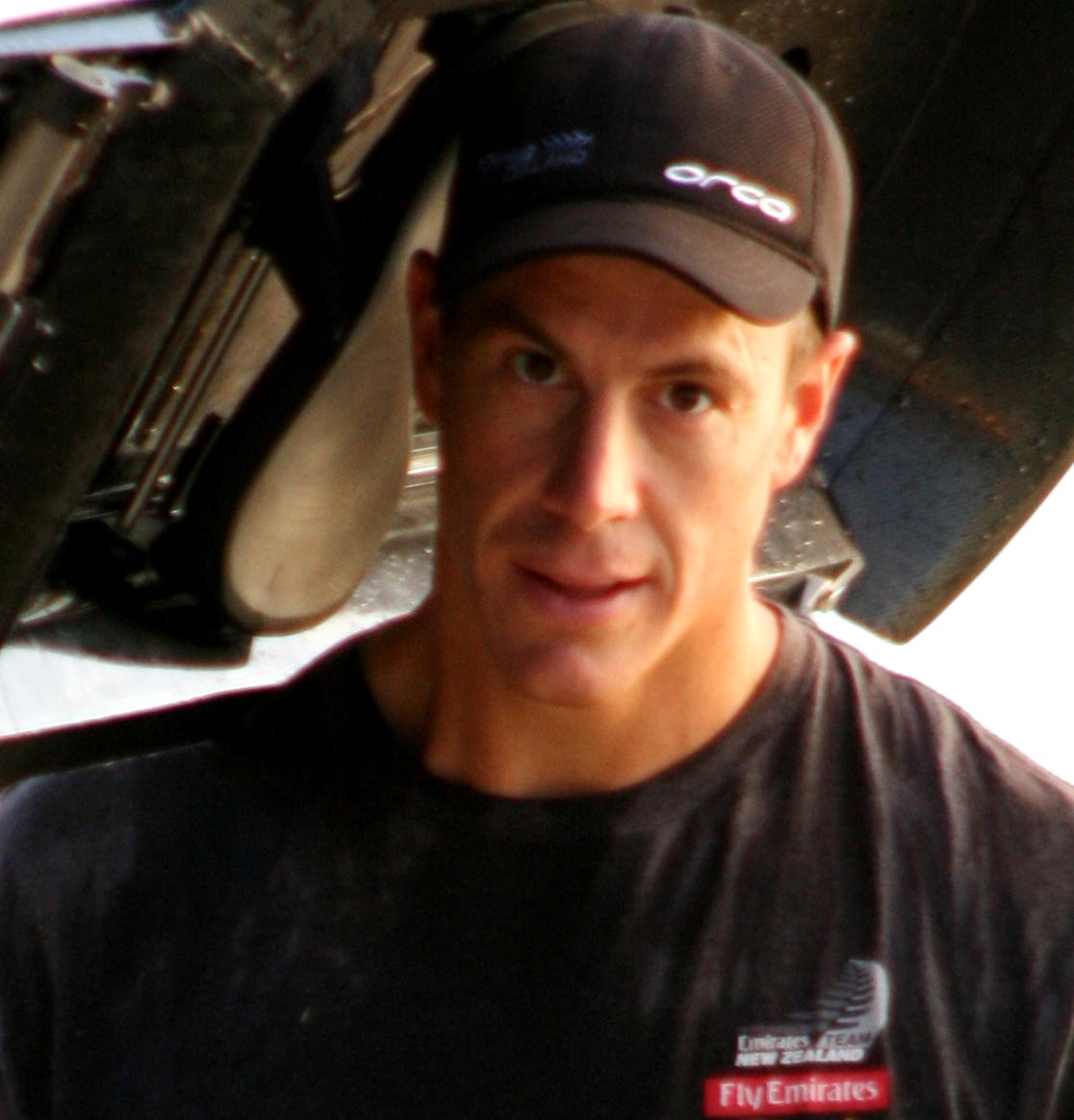
Rob Waddell

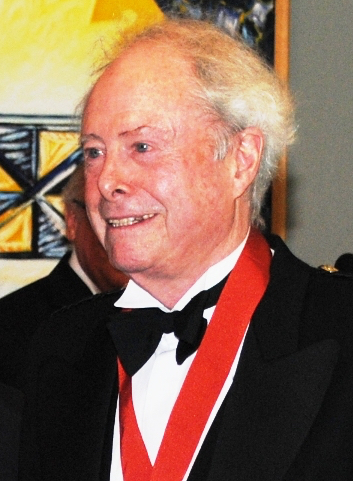
James Wallace

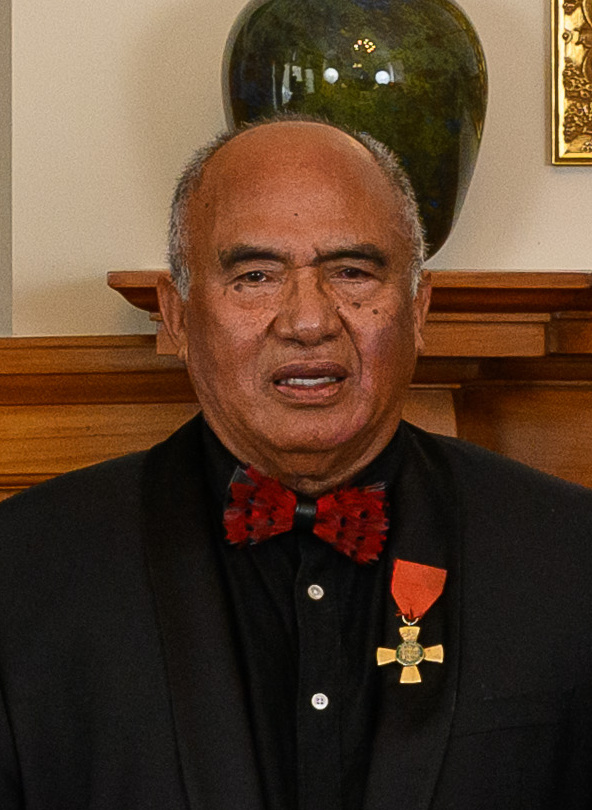
Fatu Feu'u

=== Member (MNZM) ===
- Alexander John Adams – of Christchurch. For services to flood risk management.
- The Reverend Mark Thomas Beale – of Auckland. For services to the community.
- Hori George Te Takinga Bennett – of Rotorua. For services to broadcasting.
- Lieutenant Colonel (Rtd) Lawrence Morris Blyth MM ED JP – of Auckland. For services to war veterans and the community.
- Rowan James Brassey – of Auckland. For services to bowls.
- Robin Edwin Brassington – of Levin. For services to education and the community.
- Errol Freeman Brathwaite – of Christchurch. For services to literature.
- Colleen Brenda Brown JP – of Auckland. For services to the community.
- Raymond Daniel Cody – of Auckland. For services to sports broadcasting and the community.
- Roderick William Coleman – of Wanganui. For services to motorcycling.
- Pamela Ann Collings – of Rangiora. For services to aviation.
- Gael Marion Collins JP – of Auckland. For services to the community.
- Jayne Craike – of Auckland. For services to equestrian sport.
- Dr Leslie Ding – of Christchurch. For services to medicine and the community.
- Danae Clare Goosman – of Christchurch. For services to sport.
- William Morris Gosden – of Wellington. For services to film festivals.
- Richard John Hayes – of Te Anau. For services to search and rescue operations.
- George William Neil Johansen JP – of Palmerston North. For services to the community.
- Derek George Jones – of Christchurch. For services to harness racing.
- Leilani Joyce – of Hamilton. For services to squash.
- David Auld Kilgour – of Dunedin. For services to music.
- Lineahi Siale Fanovaha Lund – of Auckland. For services to the Niuean community.
- Lindsay Albert George McCallum – of Waikanae. For services to the business community.
- David Francis MacCalman – of Katikati. For services to sport.
- Ronald Bruce McNaughton JP – of Auckland. For services to local government and the community.
- Donald Eugene McRae JP – of Christchurch. For services to welfare.
- Ronald Wallace Messenger – of Greymouth. For services to sport and the community.
- Jagdish Chandra Natali JP – of Auckland. For services to the community.
- Desmond Joseph Nolan – of Haast. For services to aviation and the community.
- Ou Lu – of Lower Hutt. For services to ballet.
- Fuimaono Karl Pulotu-Endemann JP – of Wellington. For services to public health.
- George Paramena Rehu – of Rotorua. For services to returned services personnel.
- Audrey Reynolds – of Paraparaumu. For services to the community.
- Heather Jean Robson – of Auckland. For services to racquet sports.
- Dr Barbara Louise Ryan – of Eastbourne. For services to women and the community.
- Wesley Arthur Ryan – of Christchurch. For services to conservation.
- David George Scott – of Ohakune. For services to the community.
- Henry William Dickens Skidmore JP – of Te Aroha. For services to local body and community affairs.
- Dr Allan Gibson Smith – of Porirua City. For services to community medicine.
- John Campbell Thomas – of Waikouaiti. For services to theatre.
- Richard Gwynne Trimble – of Auckland. Superintendent, New Zealand Police.
- David Tua (Mafaufau Sita) – of Auckland. For services to boxing.
- Ruth Jasmine Underhill JP – of Porirua City. For services to local body and community affairs.
- Gina Louise Weber – of Waitakere City. For services to softball.
- Michael Donald Worth JP – of Tokoroa. For services to local-body and community affairs.
- Walter Denzil Wyatt – of Auckland. For services to Korea veterans.
- Lieutenant Colonel Charles Alexander Sylvester Lott – Royal New Zealand Army Logistic Regiment.
- Warrant Officer Marine Technical (Propulsion) Paul Andrew Coleman – Royal New Zealand Navy.
- Warrant Officer John Paul Fleming – Royal New Zealand Air Force.
- Chief Petty Officer Seaman George Taranaki McGarvey – Royal New Zealand Navy.

Additional

- Lieutenant Commander Shaun Thomas Fogarty – Royal New Zealand Navy.
- Major Peter Te Aroha Emile Kelly – Royal New Zealand Infantry Regiment.
- Squadron Leader Mark David Cook – Royal New Zealand Air Force.
- Warrant Officer Class One Peter Bowyer – Royal New Zealand Infantry Regiment.
- Staff Sergeant Shane Geoffrey Vooght – The Corps of Royal New Zealand Engineers.

Honorary

- Maria Magdalena Westenberg Tibbe – of Christchurch. For services to women.
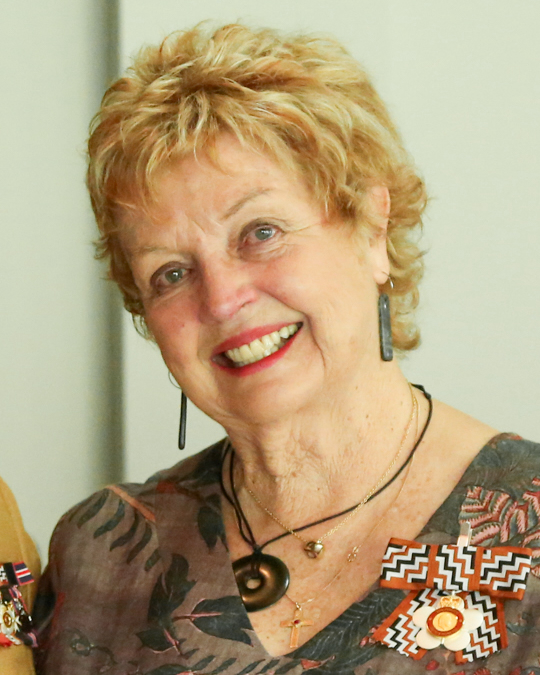
Colleen Brown

Richard Hayes

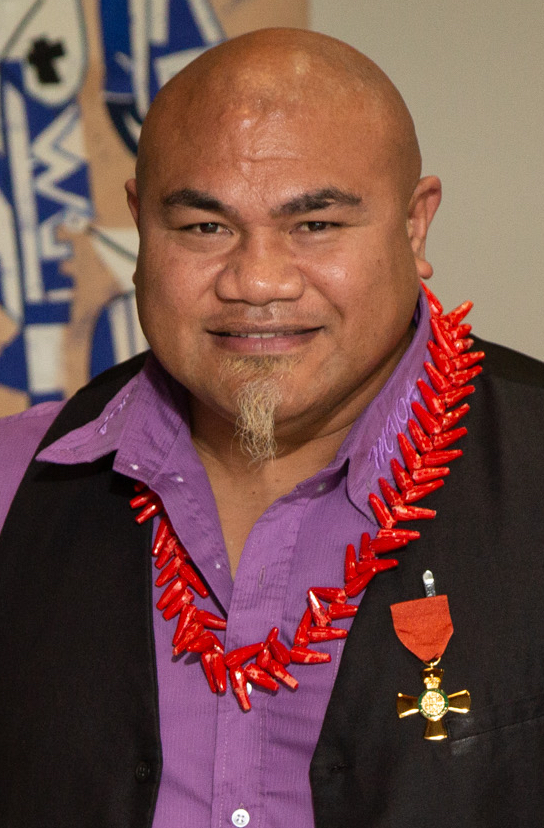
David Tua

== Companion of the Queen's Service Order (QSO) ==
=== For community service ===
- The Reverend Canon Te Rua Moera Anderson – of Ōtorohanga.
- Dr (Mohammad) Ashraf Choudhary JP – of Palmerston North.
- Denis Scott Currie – of Papakura.
- Ruth Seline Filler – of Auckland.
- (Hohi Ngapera Te Moana) Keri Kaa – of Tikitiki.
- Anna Maria (Maree) Millar MBE – of Whangārei.
- Marcia Dawn Read – of Auckland.
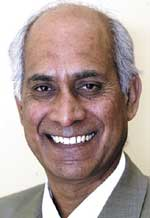
Ashraf Choudhary

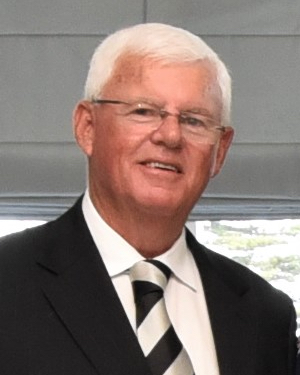
Denis Currie

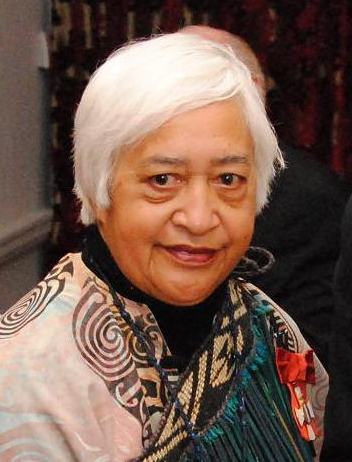
Keri Kaa

=== For public services ===
- Paul Stephen Carpinter – of Christchurch.
- Dr David George Chaplow – of Auckland.
- Roma Miringa Cook JP – of Rotorua.
- James Michael Fenton – of Invercargill.
- Dr Stuart Peter Gowland – of Christchurch.
- Margaret Constance Long – of Ōtaki.
- Dr (Ralph Heberley) Ngātata Love JP – of Petone.
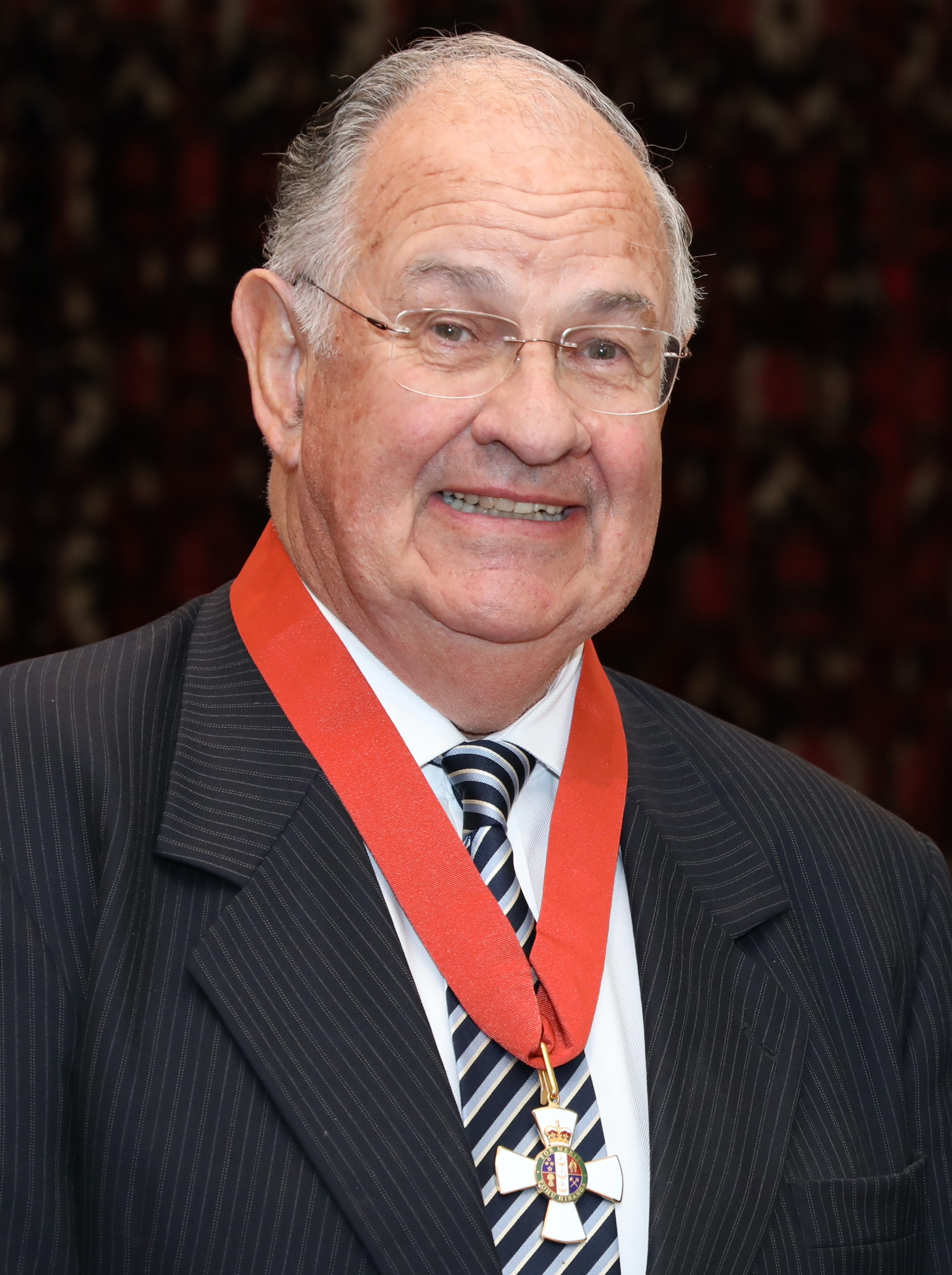
Stuart Gowland

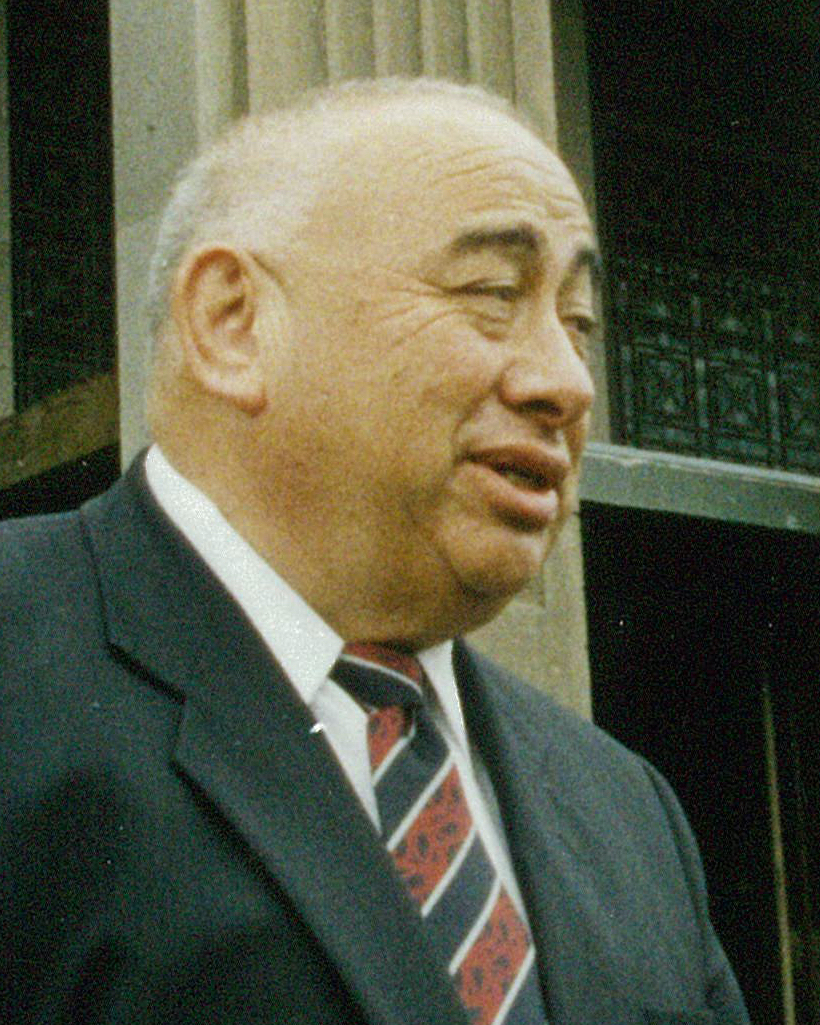
Ngātata Love

== Queen's Service Medal (QSM) ==
=== For community service ===
- Lillian Patricia Anderson – of Auckland.
- Trevor William Andrews – of Hamilton.
- Indu Bajaj – of Auckland.
- Richard James Blundell – of Napier.
- Raena Clark JP – of Waitakere City.
- James Albert Dangerfield – of Dunedin.
- Margaret Jane Cleland Donnelley – of Levin.
- Janet Elizabeth Emery JP – of Napier.
- Kathleen Evans – of Levin.
- Maria Matalena George – of Ōtara.
- Irene Denise Green – of Matamata.
- Kenneth Raymond Greenslade – of Queenstown.
- Margaret Louisa Hansen JP – of Auckland.
- Janet Athalie Henderson – of Hamilton.
- Brian Kenneth Hudson – of Porirua City.
- Rosemary Gertrude Hudson – of Porirua City.
- Shirley Kilgour – of Blenheim.
- Donald John McFarlane – of Christchurch.
- Jean Frances Mapson – of Ngatea.
- (Margaret) Joan Massey JP – of Waiuku.
- Tuarangi Michael Toki – of Waitakere City.
- The Reverend Father Roderick Milne – of Ōtaki.
- Rodney Mark Ottaway – of Kaiwaka.
- Livinia Margaret Paterson – of Cromwell.
- Barbara Elizabeth Phillipps – of Dunedin.
- Honor Rickard – of Rangitukia.
- Eunice May Riddle – of Pukekohe.
- Annette Rutter – of Manukau City.
- Constance Sager – of Putāruru.
- Anne Rachael Sayers – of Hamilton.
- Elwyn Margaret Wynn Stevens – of Palmerston North.
- Edward Taylor – of Auckland.
- Barry John Veale – of Hokitika.
- Helen Alison Weggery – of Tokomaru.
- Lorraine Margeret Wilson JP – of Auckland.

=== For public services ===
- Leota John Ahdar – of Christchurch.
- Graeme Alexander Anderson – of Alexandra.
- Noel Bertrand Briggs – of Ashburton.
- Victor Joseph Brown – of Ngunguru; chief fire officer, Tutukaka Coast Volunteer Fire Brigade, New Zealand Fire Service.
- Margaret Jean Christensen – of Masterton.
- Derek Davison – of Auckland; inspector, New Zealand Police.
- Thelma Joyce Fagan – of Taupō.
- Daphne May Fairbairn – of Auckland.
- The Reverend Penelope Pamela Fisher – of Lower Hutt.
- Peter Graham Gilroy – of Christchurch; detective, New Zealand Police.
- Raymond Fredric Harris – of Wellington.
- John Vernon Head – of Wellington.
- Margaret Neilson (Tilly) Hunter – of Wellington.
- Margaret Hursthouse – of Havelock North.
- Desmond Usher Kearns JP – of Otipua, Timaru.
- William Alexander King JP – of Wānaka.
- Ian Duncan McDonald – of Paraparaumu Beach.
- Cliff Webster Mears – of Waitakere City; assistant fire region commander, Auckland, New Zealand Fire Service.
- Ian Powell – of Paekākāriki.
- Derek Newell Quickfall – of New Plymouth.
- Laxmi Rania – of Lower Hutt.
- David Harold Robertson – of Auckland.
- Brenda Gail Robinson – of North Shore City.
- Margery Ann Scott – of Auckland.
- Nona Leonce Smith (Sister Marianne Smith) – of Auckland.
- Dorothy Jean Southon – of Auckland.
- Eileen Edna Stevens – of Waihi Beach.
- Ian Walter Stewart – of Auckland.
- Warren Nils Strand – of Kumeū.
- John (Jack) Alexander Walker – of Wellington.
- Marion Elizabeth Wellington – of Waitara.
- Patrick William Whiu – of Kerikeri; senior constable, New Zealand Police.
- Thomas Barry Wilson JP – of Napier.
- Lindsay John Campbell Wright – of Kaitangata.
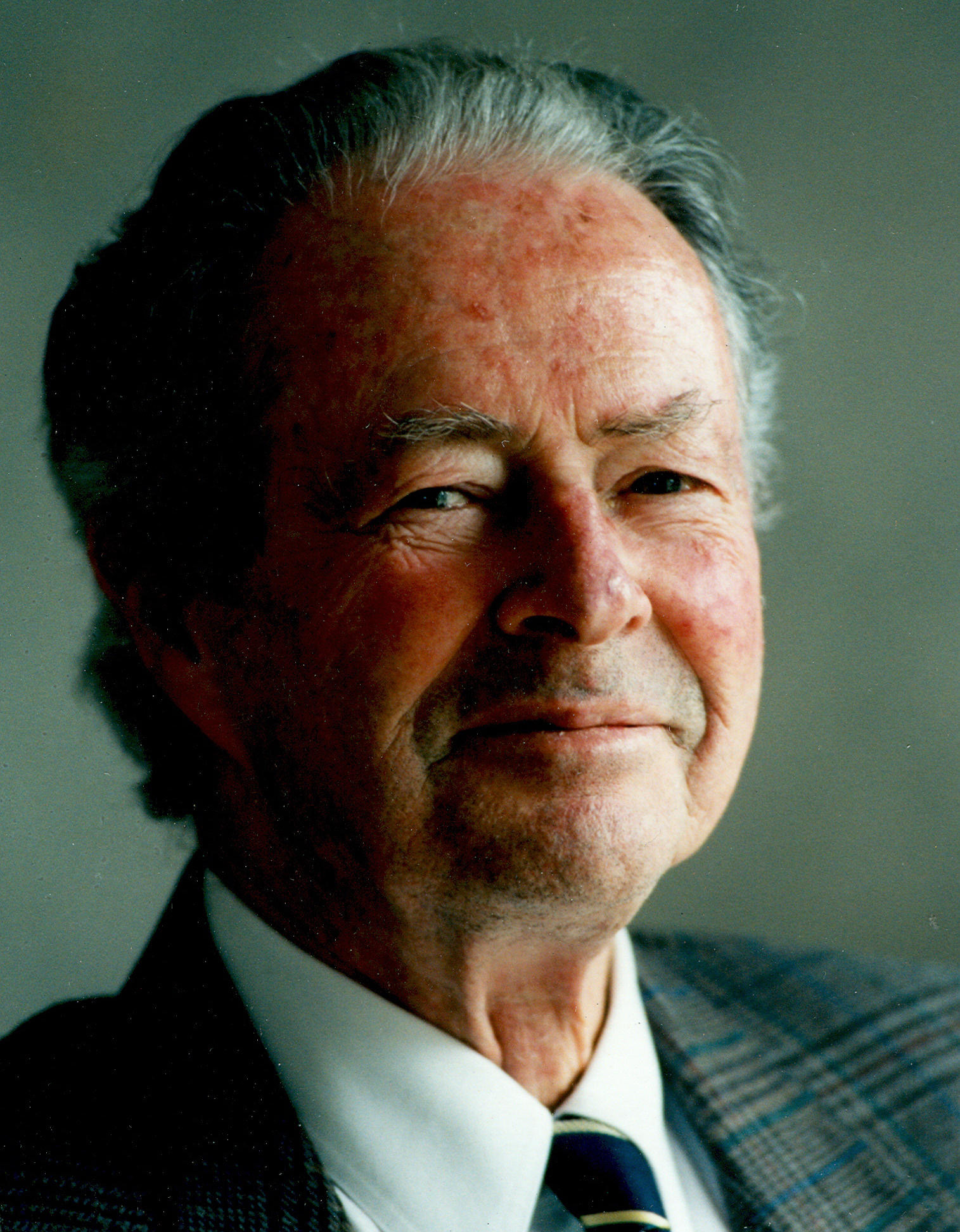
John Head
