= 2023 Birthday and Coronation Honours (New Zealand) =

Awards list for New Zealand

2023 King's Birthday and Coronation Honours
- Previous: 2023 New Year Honours; Next: 2024 New Year Honours
- Type: New Zealand royal honours: Order of New Zealand; New Zealand Order of Merit; Queen's Service Medal; Distinguished Service Decoration
- Date: 5 June 2023
- Country: New Zealand

Highlights
- Total recipients: 182

The 2023 King's Birthday and Coronation Honours in New Zealand, celebrating the official birthday and the coronation of King Charles III, were appointments made by the King in his right as King of New Zealand, on the advice of the New Zealand government, to various orders and honours to reward and highlight good works by New Zealanders. They were announced on 5 June 2023.

== Background ==
The New Zealand Government announced on 18 April 2023 that the coronation of Charles III on 6 May 2023 would be celebrated in several ways. One way to dignify the occasion was to rename this year's birthday honours as "The King's Birthday and Coronation Honours List 2023".

The recipients of honours are listed here as they were styled before their new honour.

== Order of New Zealand (ONZ) ==
Additional member

- Her Majesty The Queen LG GCVO PC – of London. For services to New Zealand.
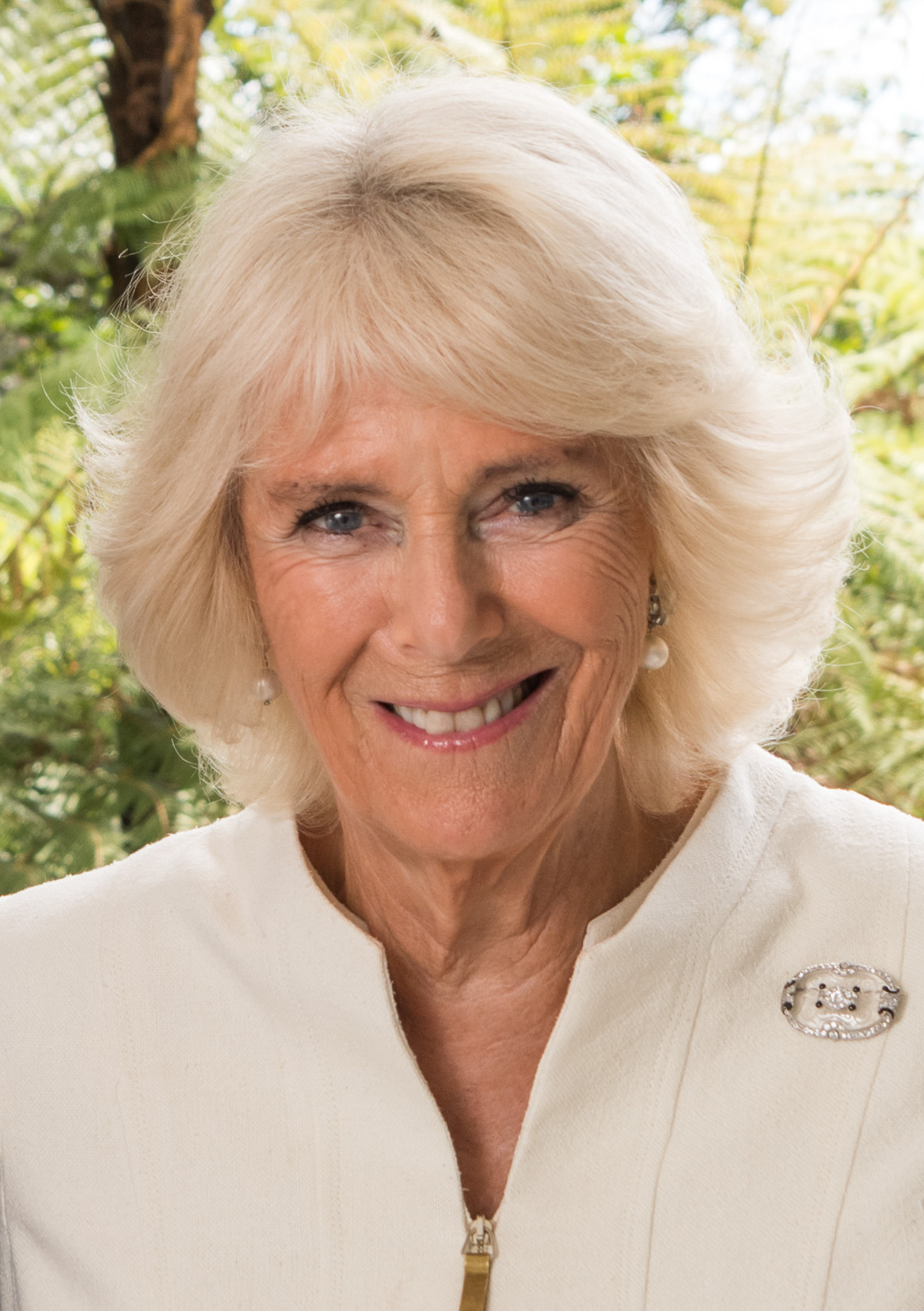
Queen Camilla

== New Zealand Order of Merit ==
=== Dame Grand Companion (GNZM) ===
- The Right Honourable Jacinda Kate Laurell Ardern – of Auckland. For services to the State.
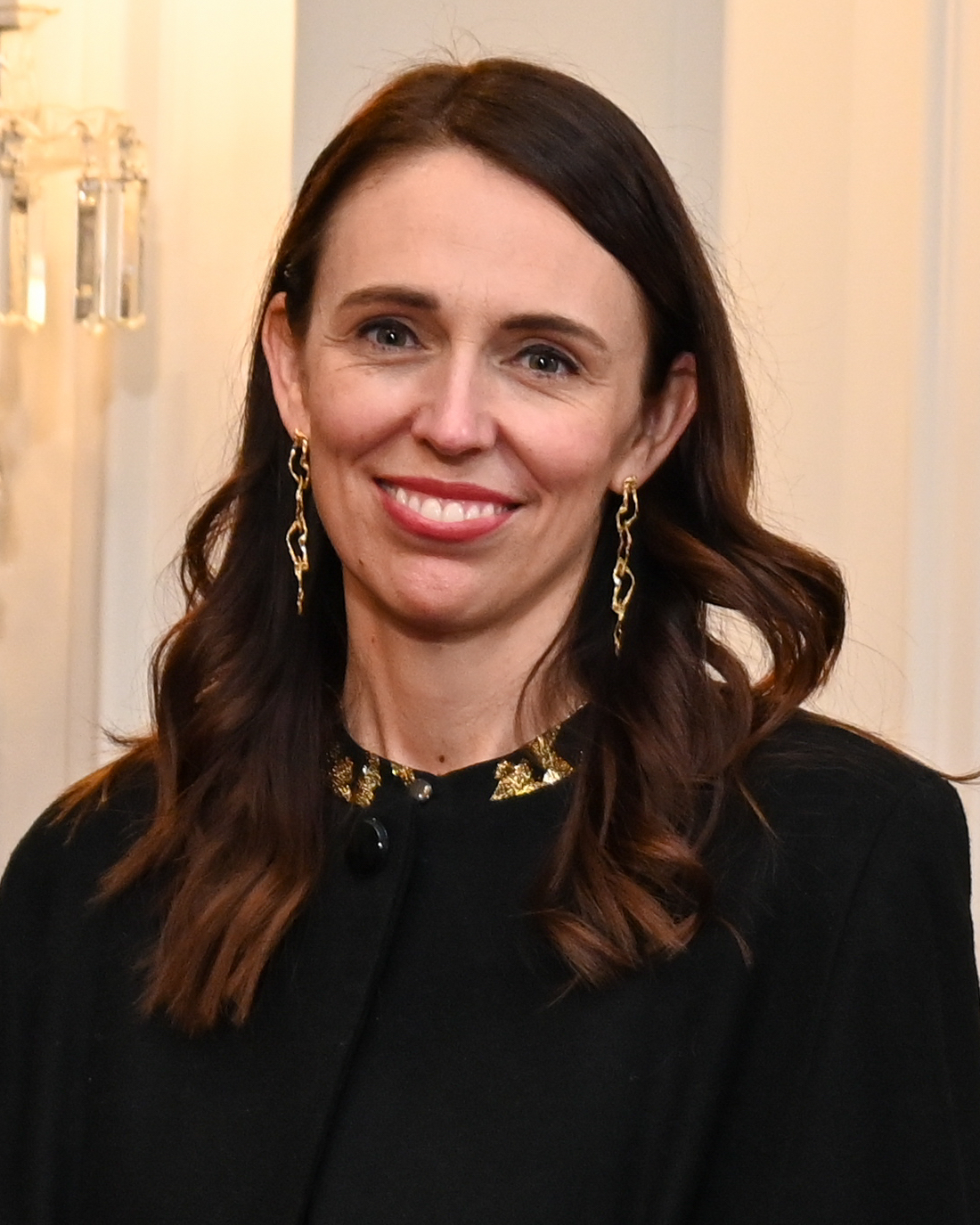
Dame Jacinda Ardern

=== Dame Companion (DNZM) ===
- Jo Anne Brosnahan QSO – of Auckland. For services to governance and business.
- Dr Teuila Mary Percival QSO – of Auckland. For services to health and the Pacific community.
- Helene Elizabeth Quilter QSO – of Wellington. For services to the public service and the arts.
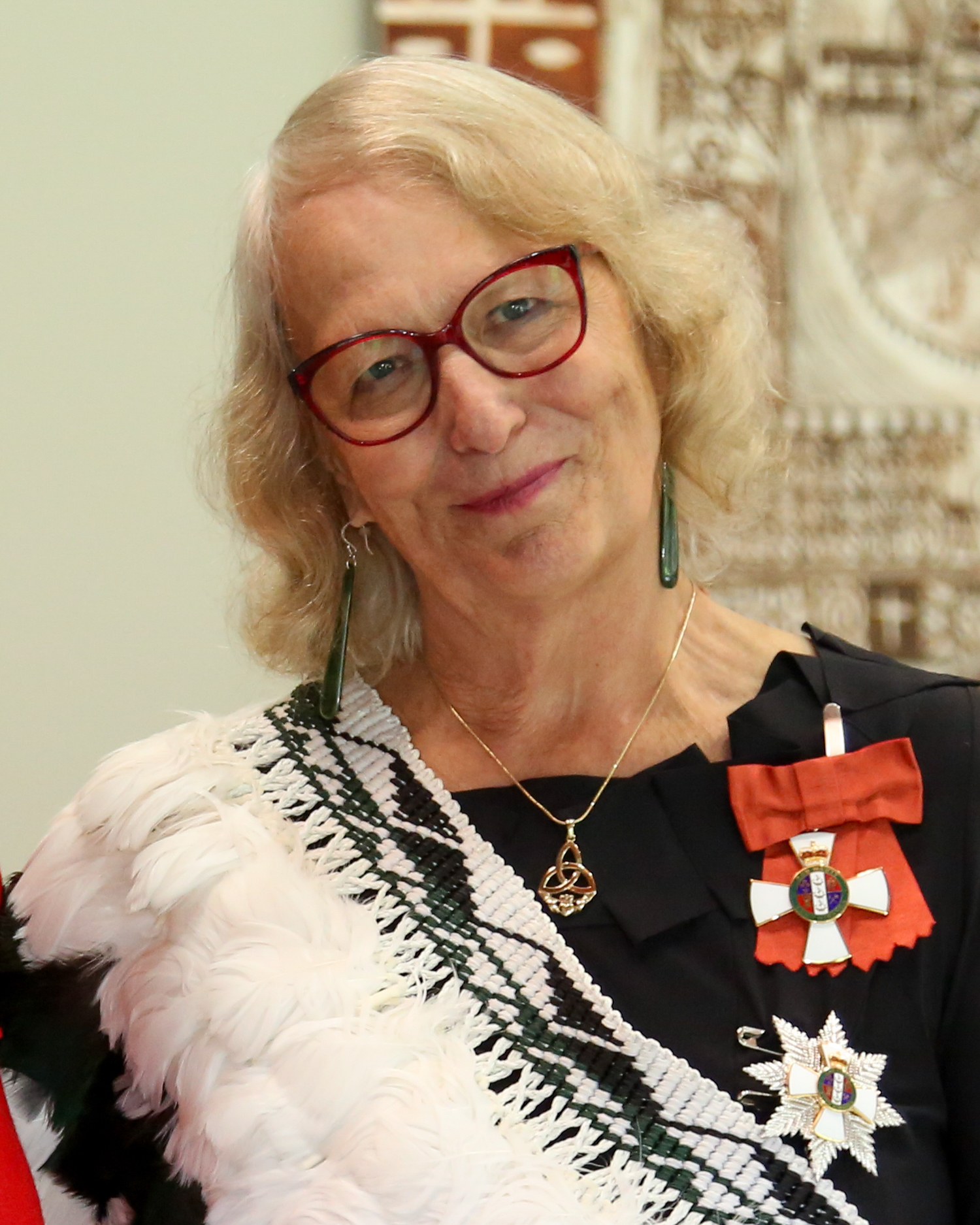
Dame Jo Brosnahan

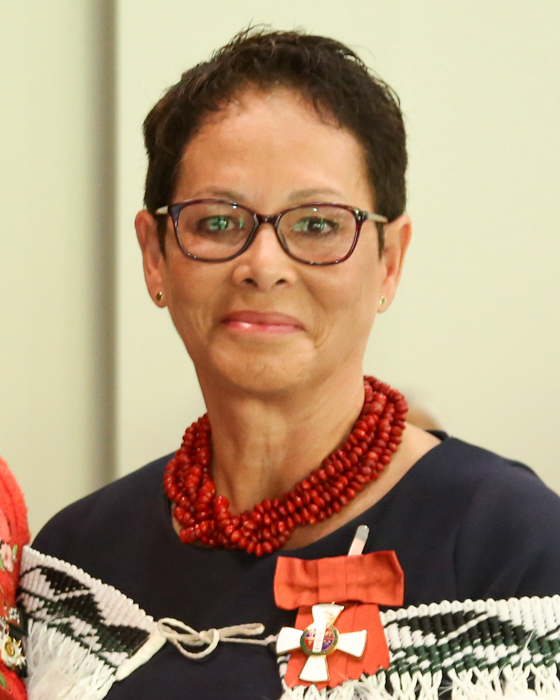
Dame Teuila Percival

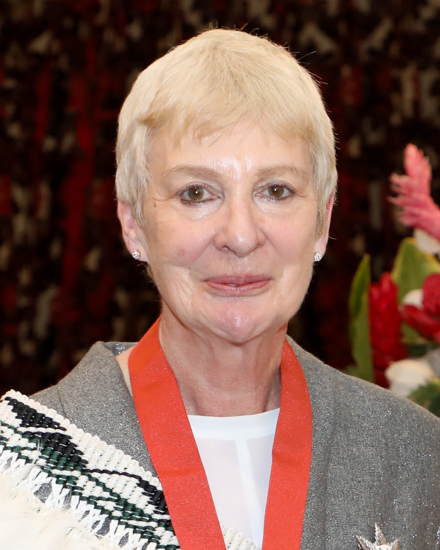
Dame Helene Quilter

=== Knight Companion (KNZM) ===
- The Honourable John Stephen Kós KC – of Porirua. For services to the judiciary and legal education.
- Selwyn Tanetoa Parata – of Gisborne. For services to Māori.
- Wayne Ross Smith CNZM – of Waihi Beach. For services to rugby.
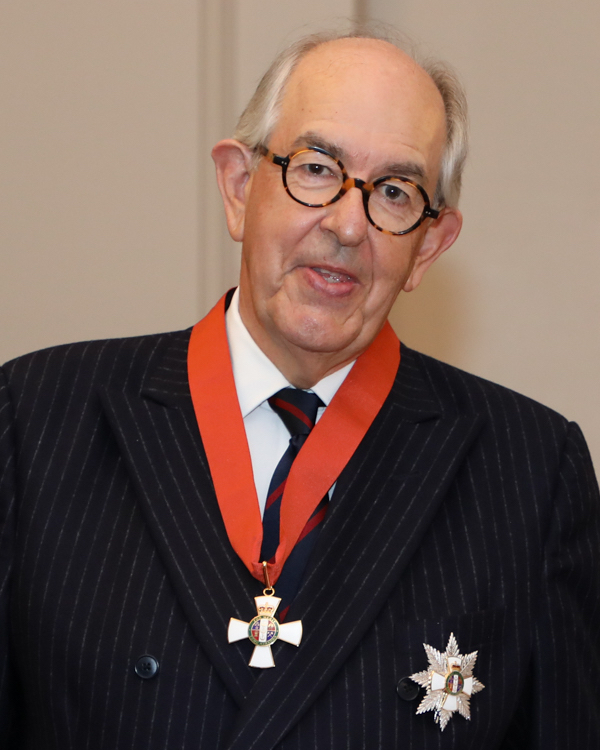
Sir Stephen Kós

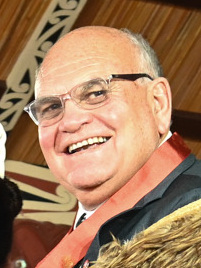
Sir Selwyn Parata

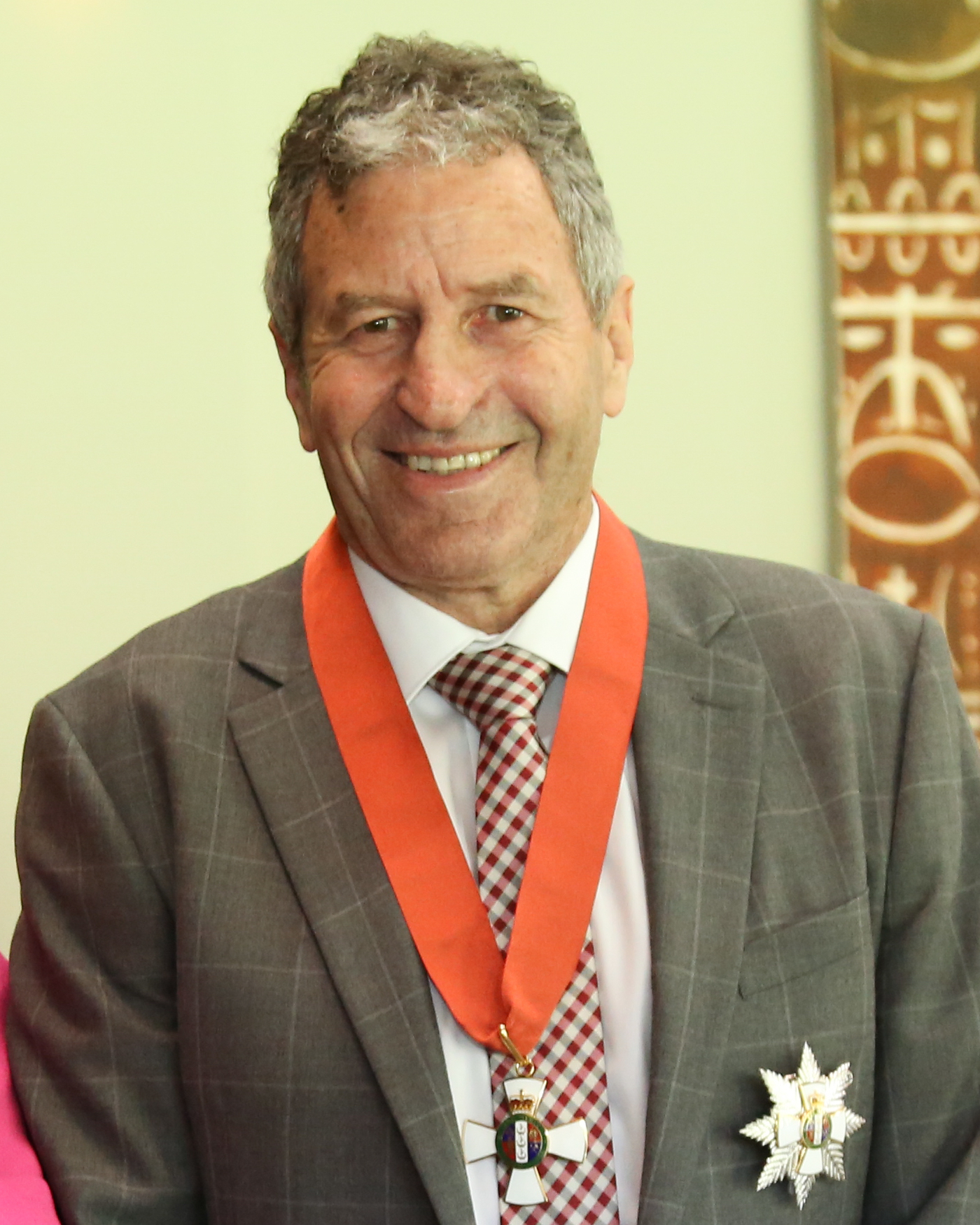
Sir Wayne Smith

=== Companion (CNZM) ===
- Rodney Keith Bracefield – of Porirua. For services to search and rescue and aviation.
- Emeritus Professor Alison Marion Cree – of Dunedin. For services to herpetology, particularly tuatara.
- The Honourable Lianne Audrey Dalziel – of Christchurch. For services to local government and as a Member of Parliament.
- Distinguished Professor Nigel Peter French – of Palmerston North. For services to epidemiology.
- Deborah Kennedy Gilbertson – of Lower Hutt. For services to business, science and technology.
- Dr Karen Lesley Grylls ONZM – of Auckland. For services to choral music.
- Colin Charles James – of Waiheke Island. For services to journalism and public policy.
- Murray Gordon McPhail – of Gisborne. For services to horticulture.
- Samuel Kevin Prime ONZM MBE – of Kawakawa. For services to Māori, the environment and health.
- Professor Ralph Ernest Harper Sims – of Palmerston North. For services to sustainable energy research.
- Dr Ruth Lilian Spearing – of Christchurch. For services to haematology.
- Dr Brian Walter Wickham – of Hamilton. For services to the dairy industry and statistical genetics.
- Dr Richard Brice Wong She – of Auckland. For services to burn care.
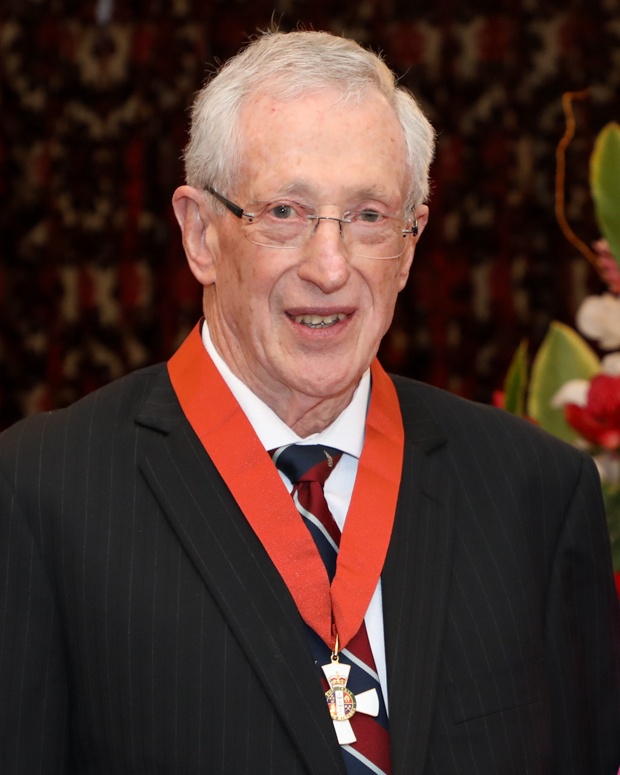
Rodney Bracefield

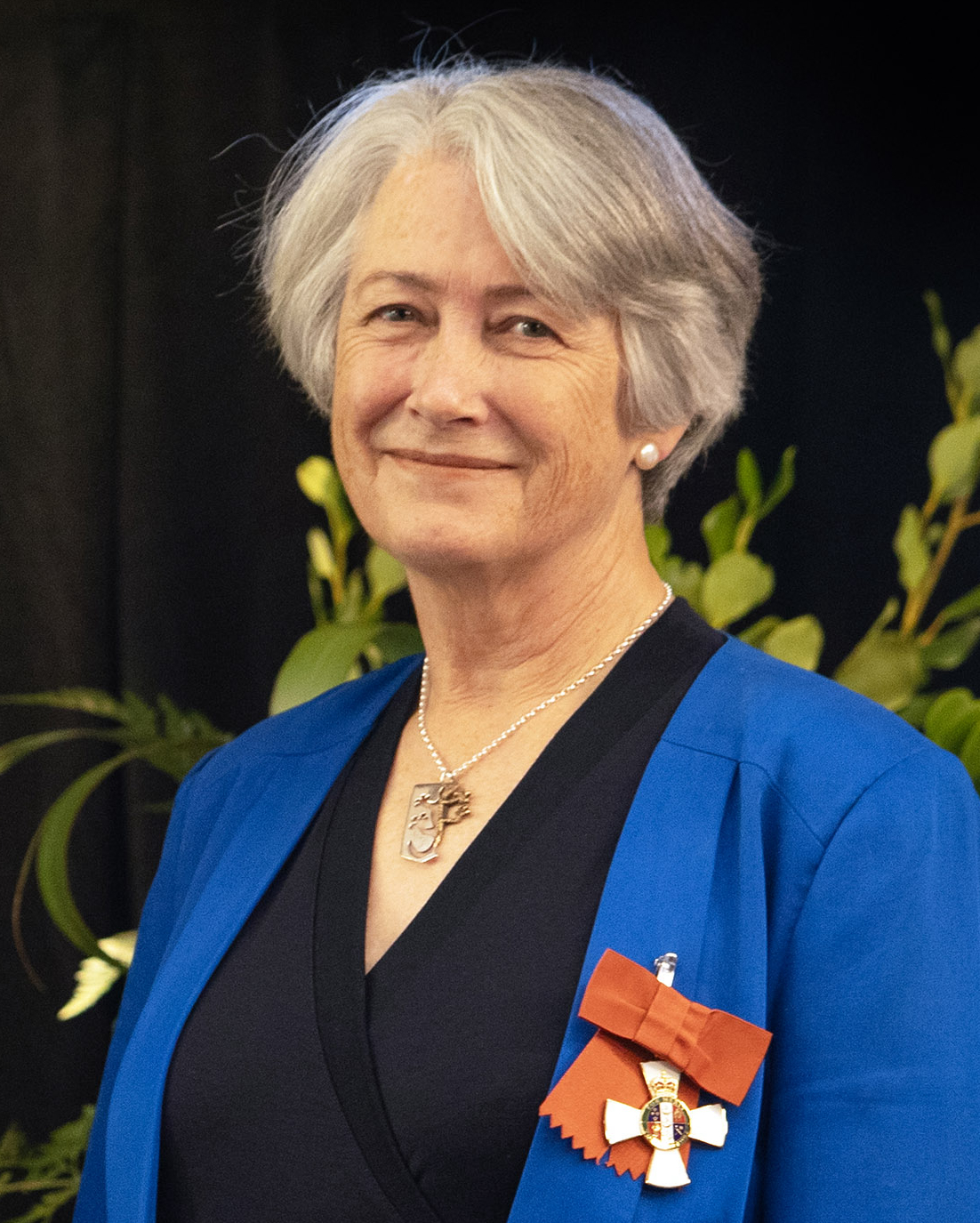
Alison Cree

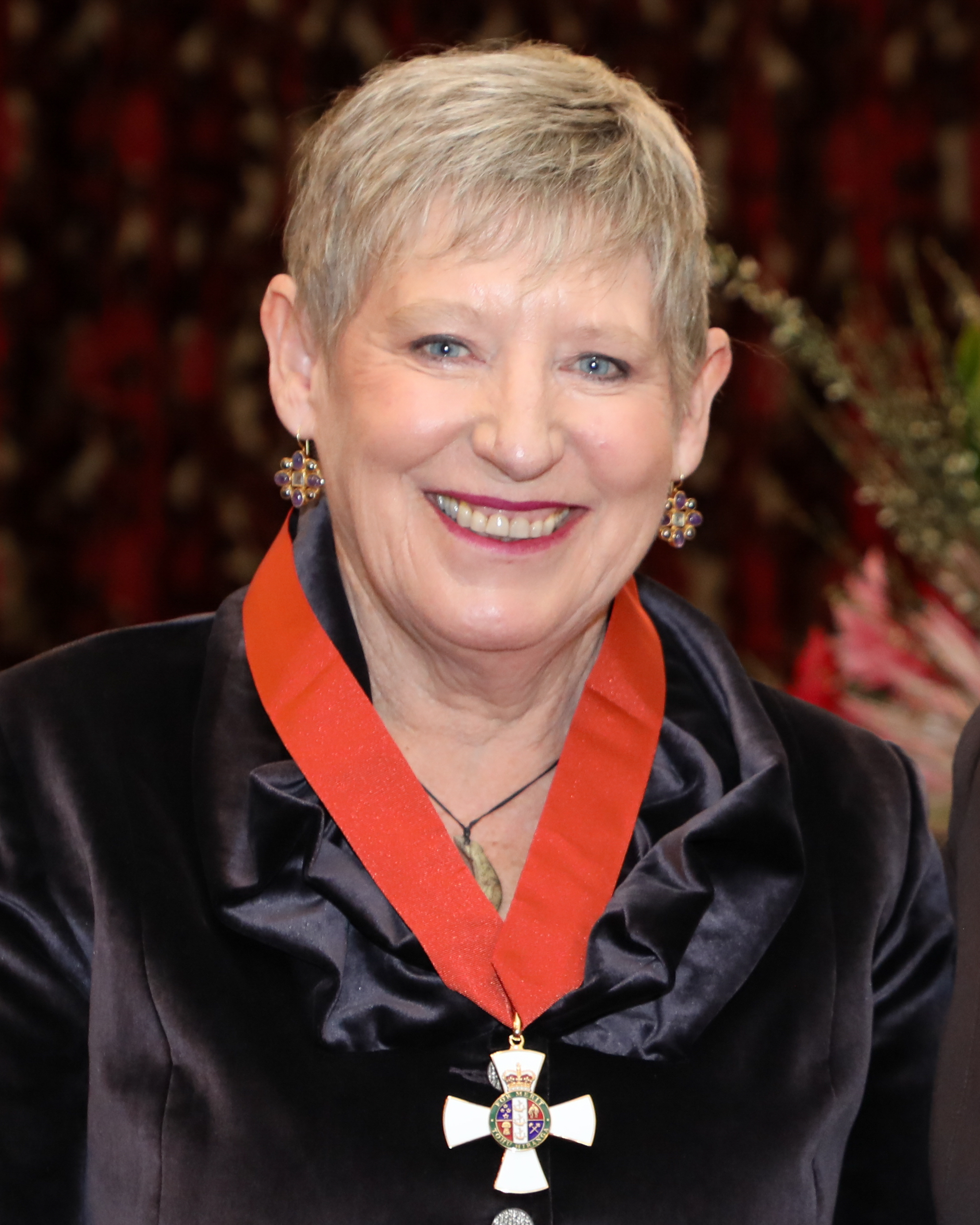
Lianne Dalziel

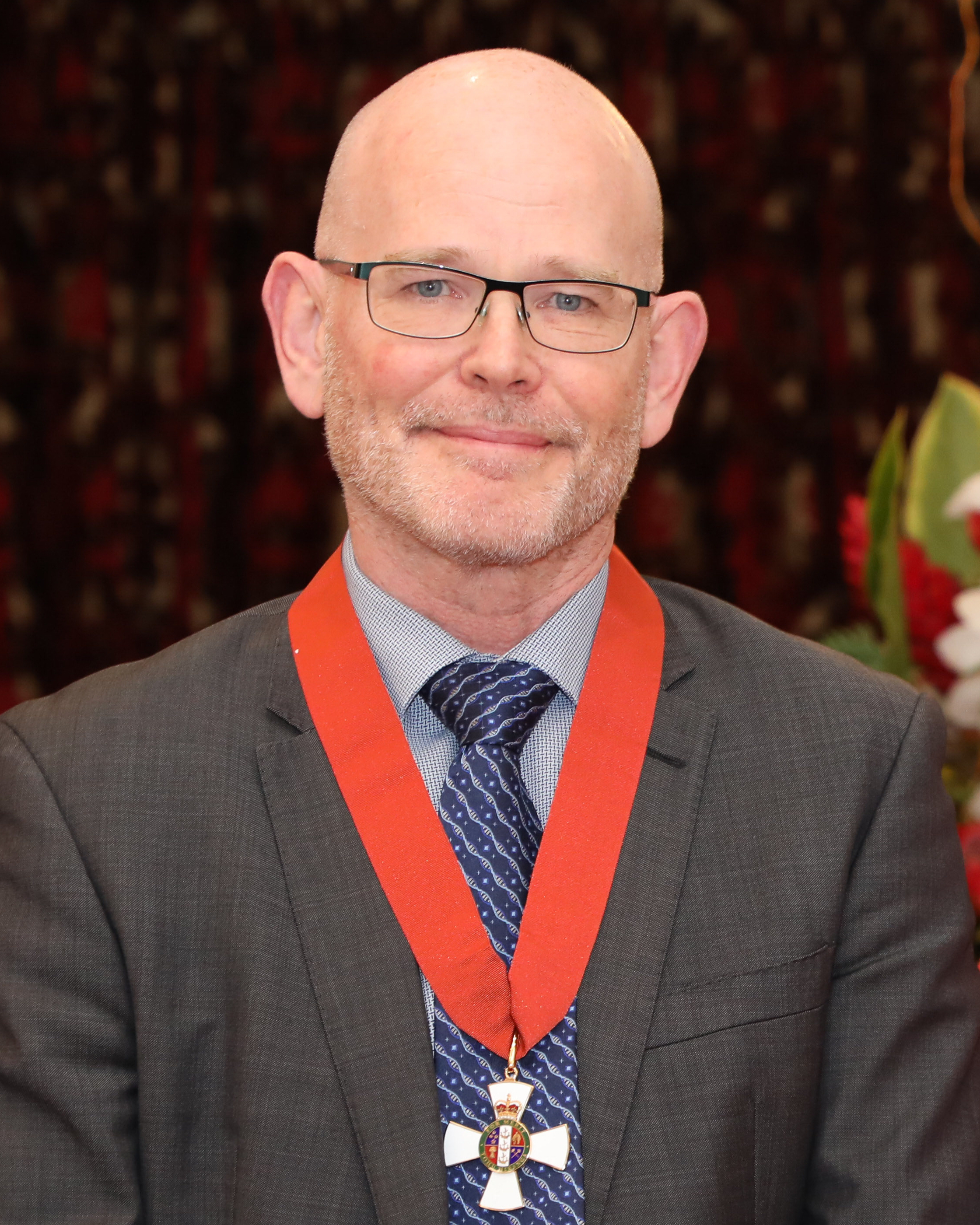
Nigel French

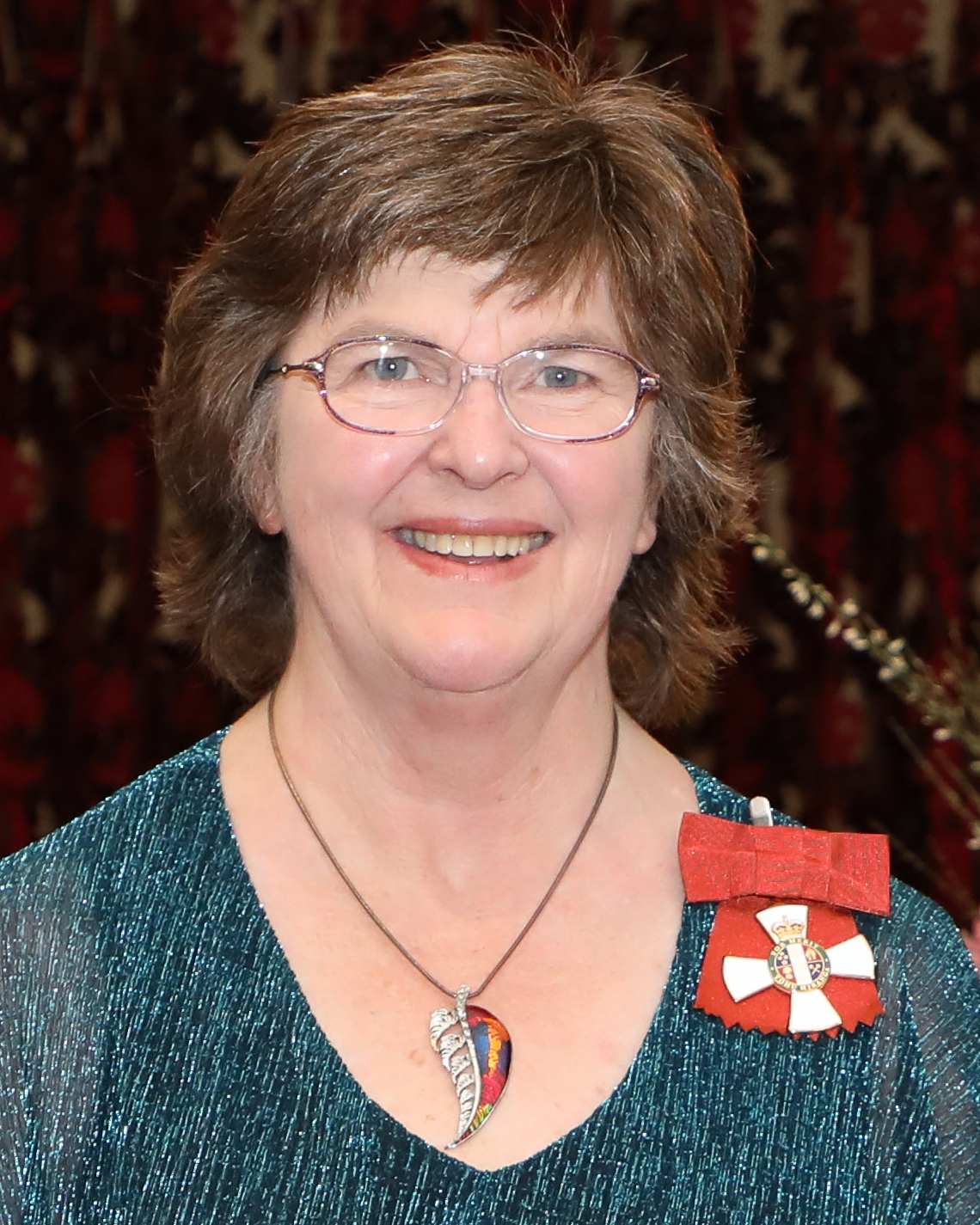
Deb Gilbertson

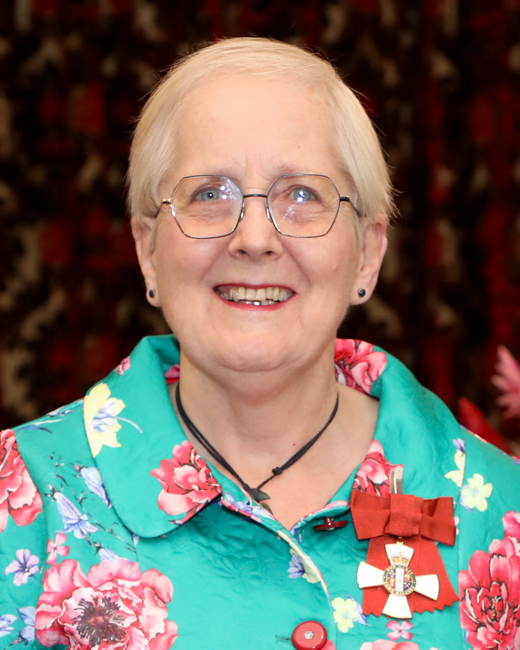
Karen Grylls

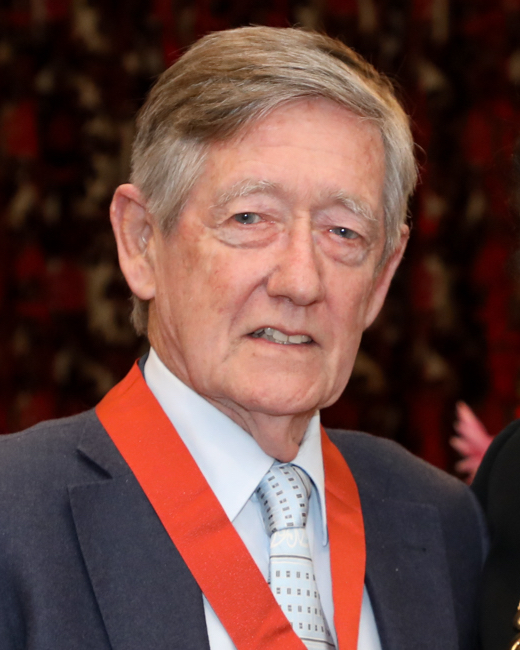
Colin James

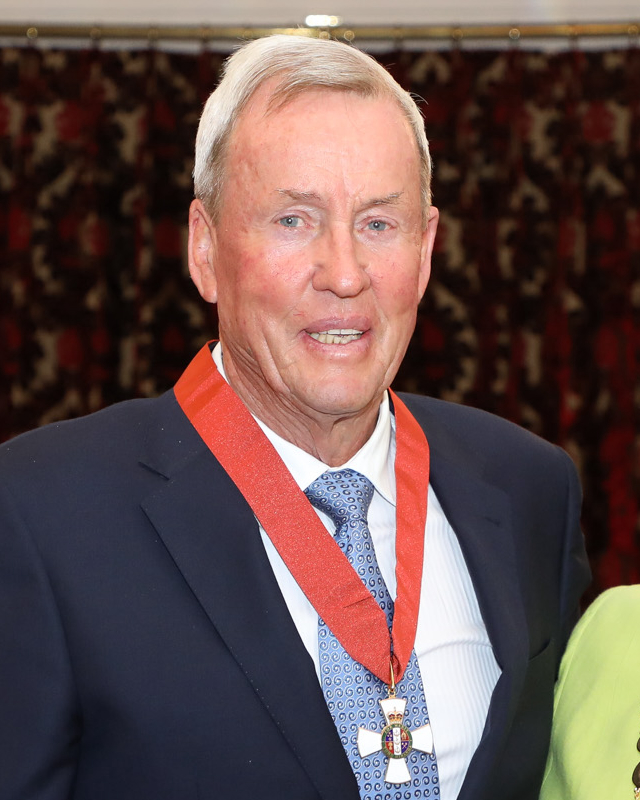
Murray McPhail

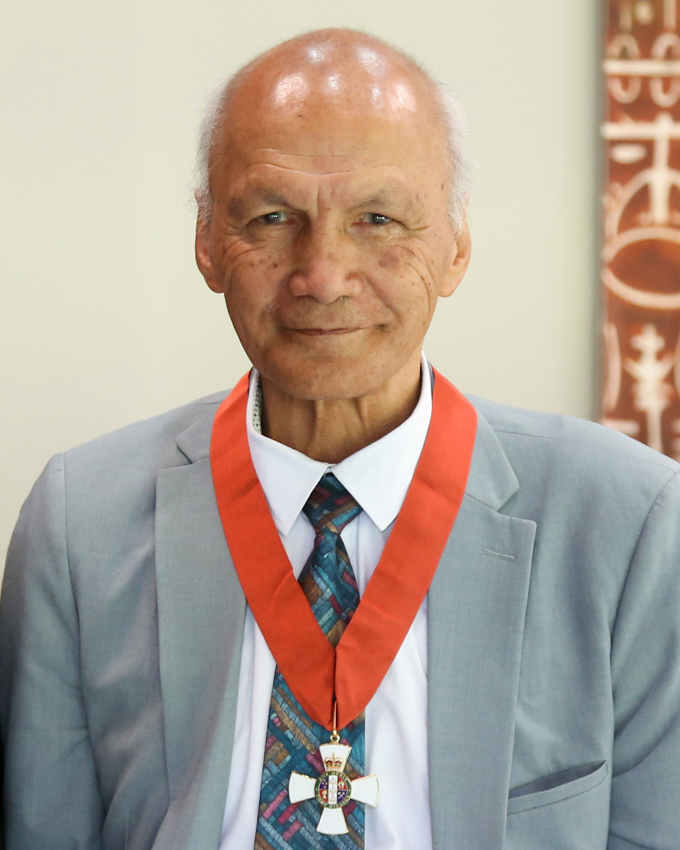
Kevin Prime

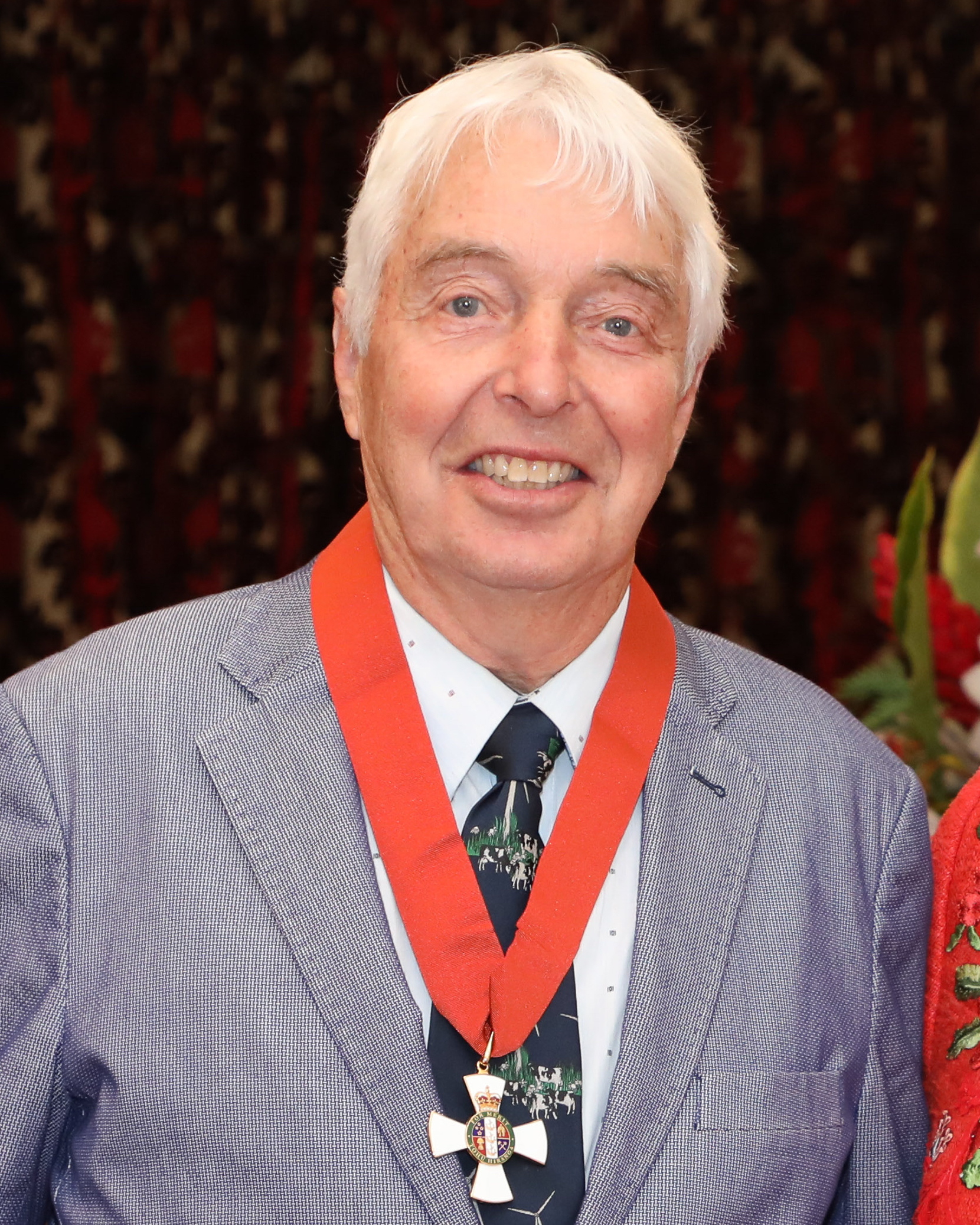
Ralph Sims

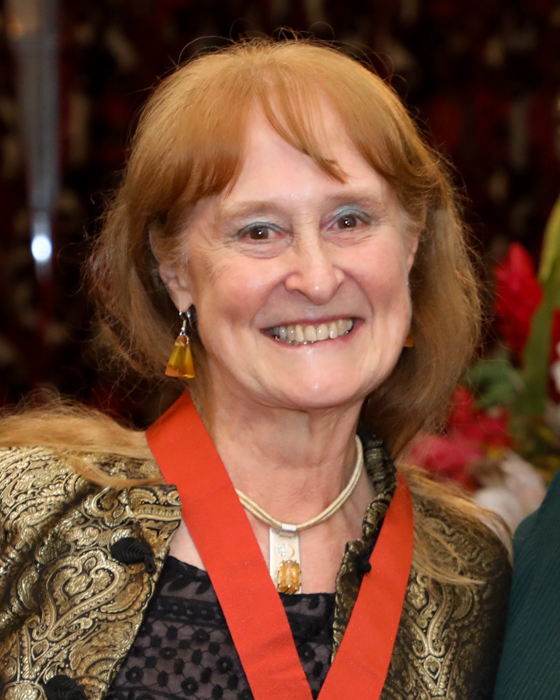
Ruth Spearing

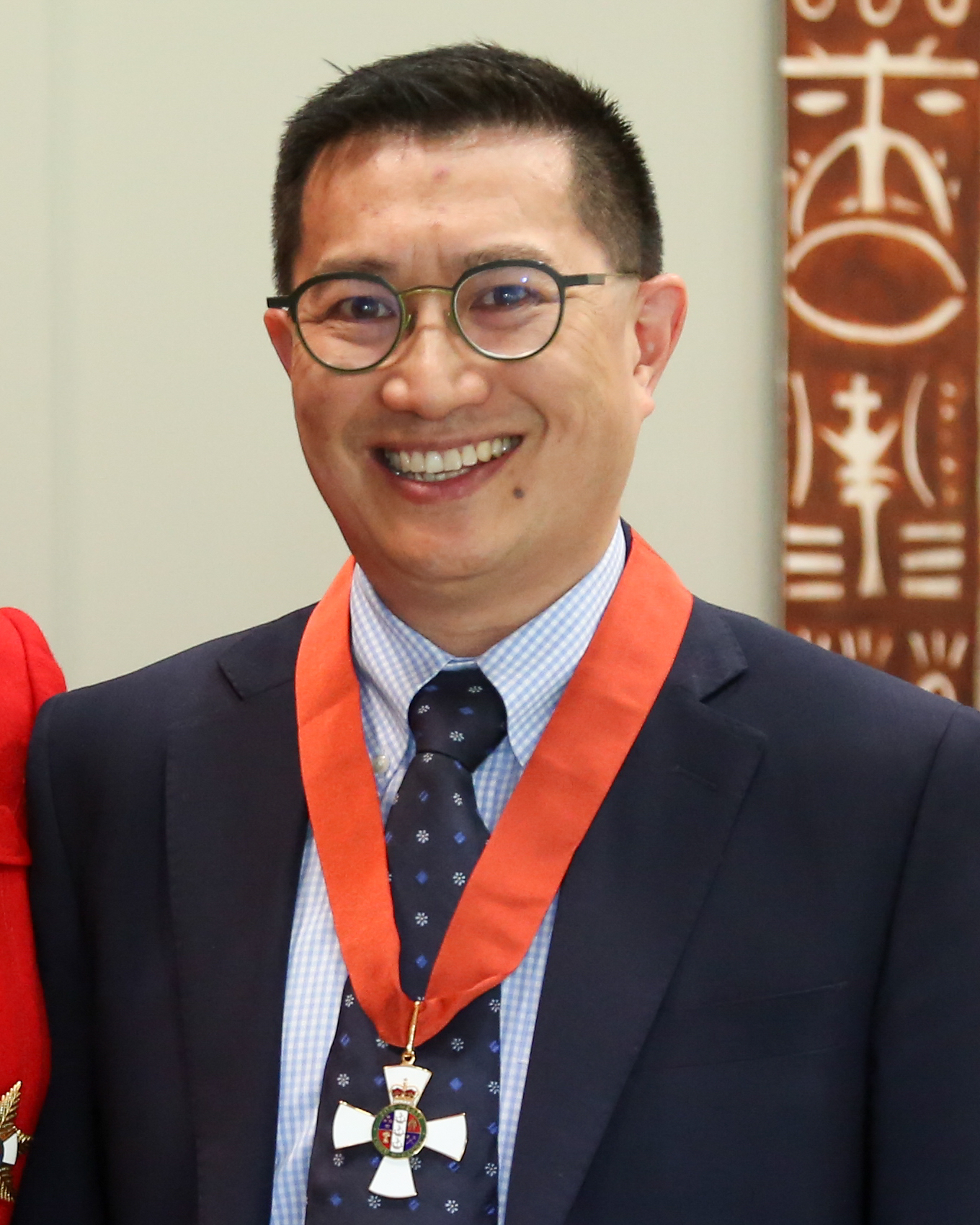
Richard Wong She

=== Officer (ONZM) ===
- Michael John Absolum – of Warkworth. For services to education.
- Associate Professor Catherine Mary Andrew – of Christchurch. For services to nursing education.
- Rodney David Baxter – of Wellington. For services to youth.
- Nicholas Robert Billowes – of Upper Hutt. For services to education.
- Owen Patrick Bosson – of Tuakau. For services to Thoroughbred racing.
- Karl Jason Chitham – of Wellington. For services to the arts, particularly Māori art.
- Philip Maurice Clarke – of Auckland. For services to arts governance.
- Professor Rochelle Lee Constantine – of Auckland. For services to wildlife conservation and marine biology.
- Dr Florence Joyce Cowan – of Auckland. For services to midwifery.
- Ria Lorraine Earp – of Wellington. For services to health.
- Dr William John Werahiko Edwards – of Hāwera. For services to Māori health.
- Dr Peter Flanagan – of Wellington. For services to blood transfusion.
- Nicolas Alfred Hager – of Wellington. For services to investigative journalism.
- Douglas Henry Hood – of Auckland. For services to the music industry.
- Colin Tindall Jones – of Auckland. For services to the dairy industry.
- Dr Shirley Jean Jülich – of Whitianga. For services to restorative justice and survivors of sexual abuse.
- Dr Michael Frederick Klaassen – of Auckland. For services to plastic and reconstructive surgery.
- Matekino Lawless QSM – of Rotorua. For services to Māori art.
- Andrew Roy Leslie MNZM – of Lower Hutt. For services to sport and the community.
- Christopher Whitcombe Maclean – of Waikanae. For services to conservation and publishing.
- Materoa Vicki-Leigh Mar – of Palmerston North. For services to Māori and Pacific health.
- Sandra Marie Morris – of Whanganui. For services as an illustrator and to education.
- Sunita Devi Narayan – of Wellington. For services to language education and the Indian community.
- Wayne Stephen Bayne Norrie – of Napier. For services to business and governance.
- Deborah Anne Panckhurst – of Wellington. For services to foreign affairs and Māori.
- Professor Emeritus Alison Mary Rich – of Dunedin. For services to oral pathology.
- Jack Michael Rikihana – of Wellington. For services to Māori, health governance and the community.
- Shae Maria Ronald – of Auckland. For services to youth.
- Bruce Ronald Russell – of Tauranga. For services to the New Zealand Police and the community.
- James Schuster – of Rotorua. For services to Māori arts and heritage preservation.
- Nua Silipa (Nua Semuā Silipa) – of Auckland. For services to Pacific education.
- Suzanne Findlay Sutherland – of Christchurch. For services to library and information services.
- John Frederic Taylor – of Paraparaumu. For services to disabled people.
- Peter John Morgan Taylor – of Renwick. For services to business.
- Professor Lynette Joy Tippett – of Auckland. For services to neuropsychology and people with dementia.
- Emeritus Professor David Robert Towns – of Auckland. For services to conservation.
- Dr Christopher Howard Wearing – of Auckland. For services to entomology and the fruit and orchard industries.
- Te Maari Anahera Whare – of Rotorua. For services to Māori language education.
- Emeritus Professor Paul Worthing Williams – of Auckland. For services to geoscience and environmental science.
- Steven Wyn-Harris – of Waipukurau. For services to the farming industry and rural communities.

Additional

- Dr Maysoon Subhi Salama – of Christchurch. For services to the Muslim community and education. (Note: Maysoon Subhi Salama was originally appointed as an Honorary Officer of the New Zealand Order of Merit, but was reclassified as an Additional Officer of the said Order with effect from 23 September 2024.)

Honorary

- Meleane Pau'uvale – of Auckland. For services to the Tongan community and education.
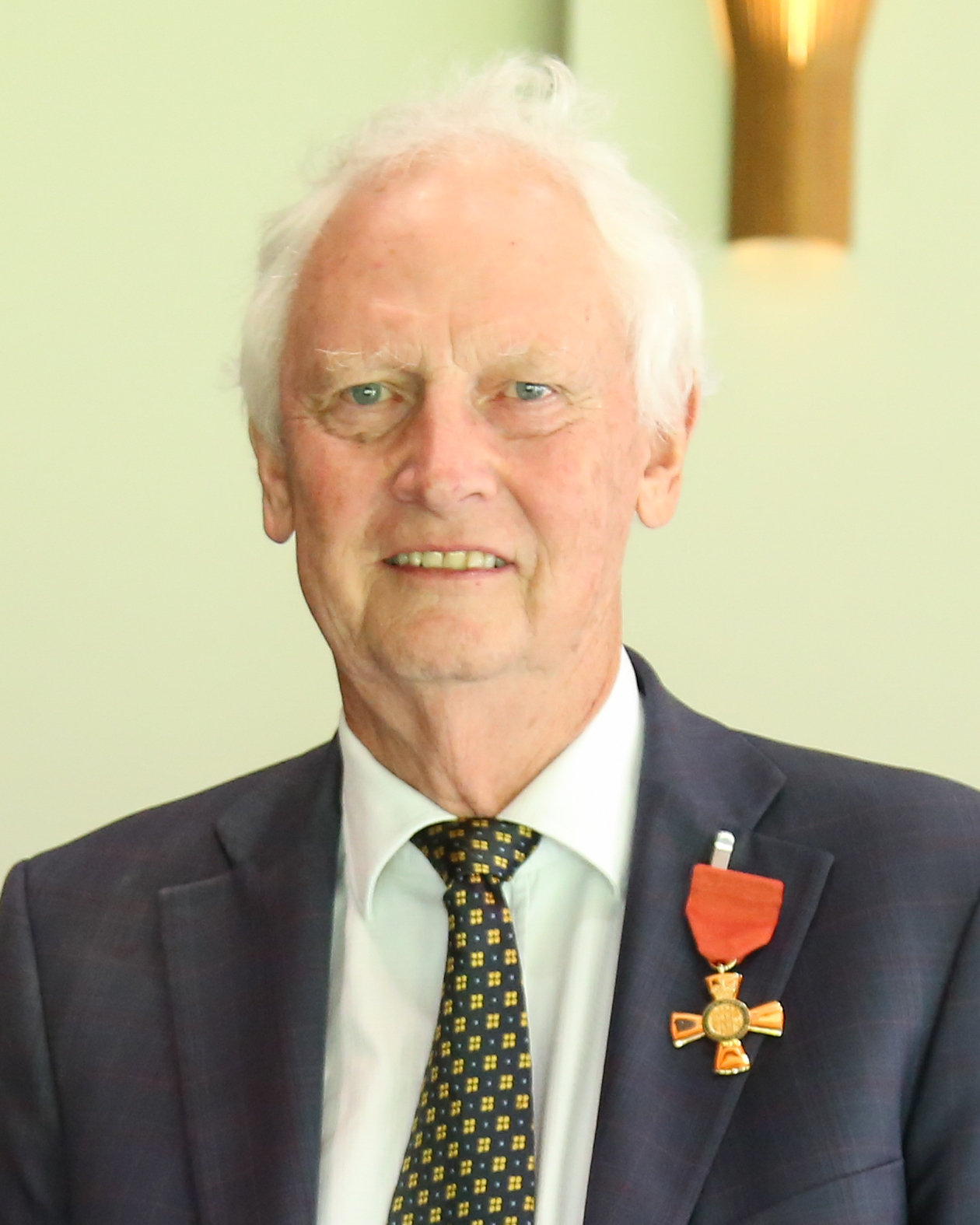
Michael Absolum

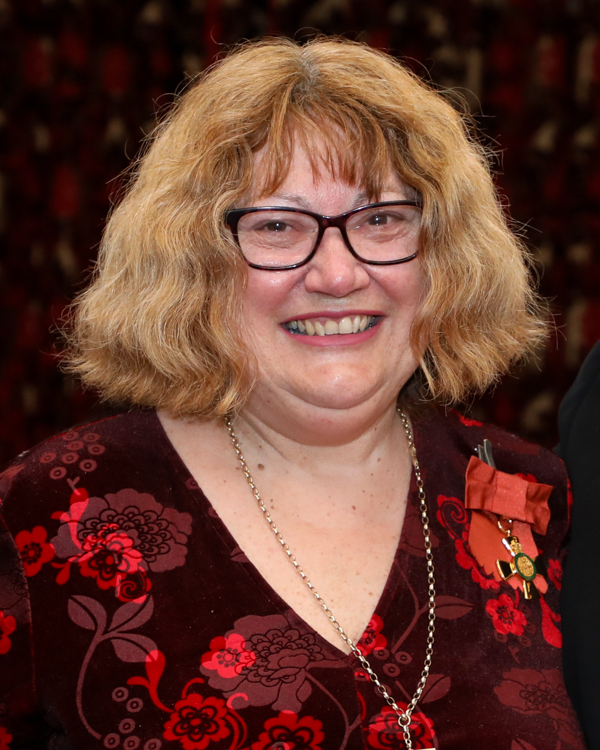
Cathy Andrew

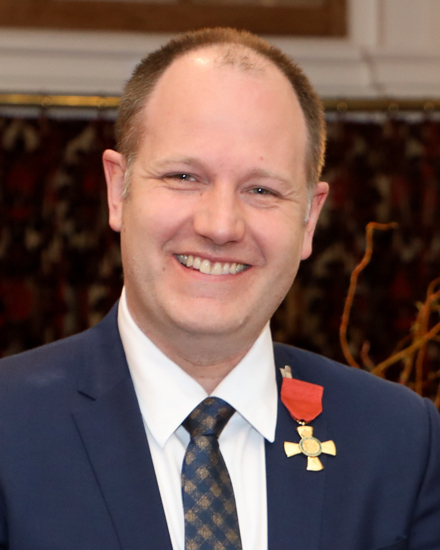
Rod Baxter

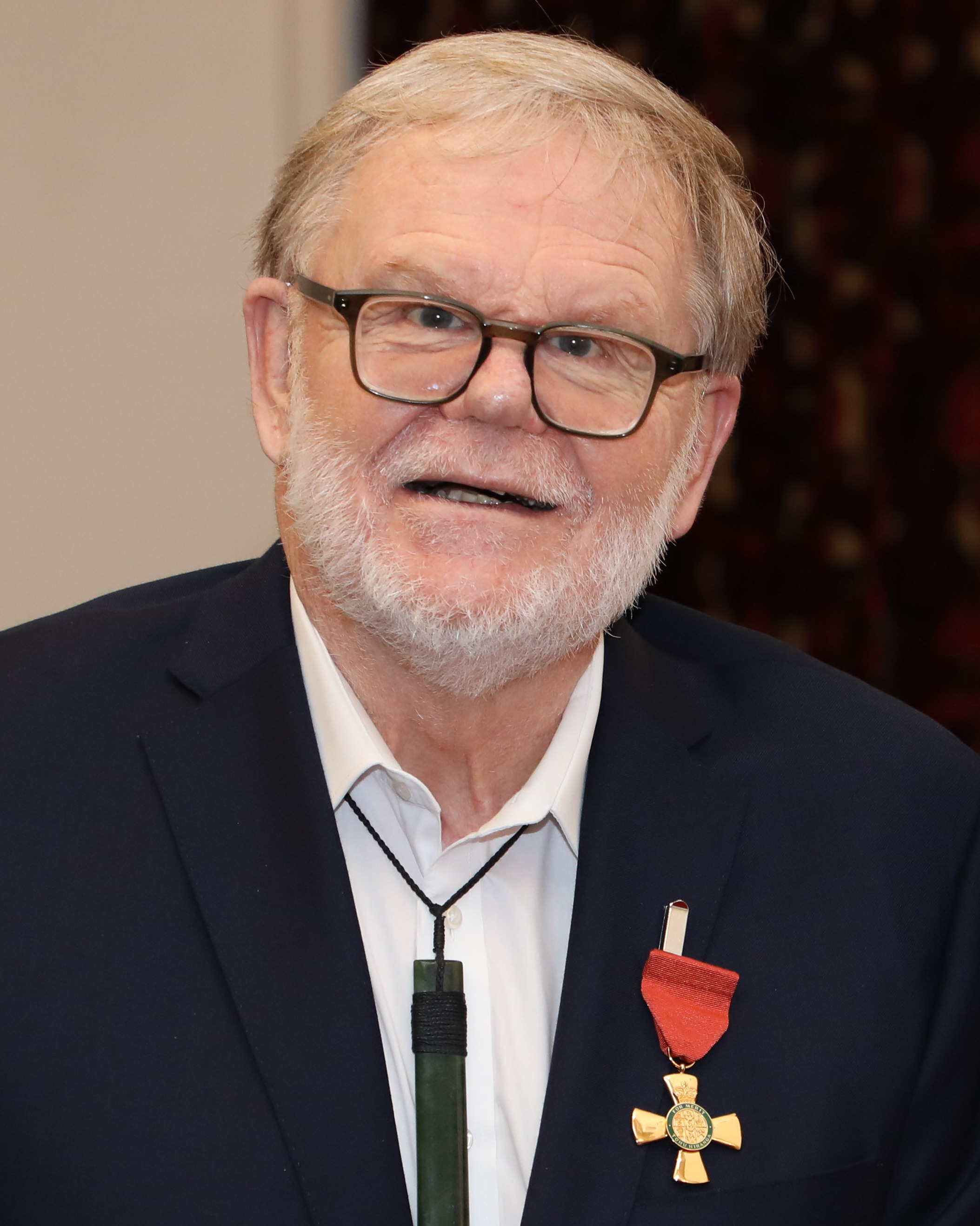
Nick Billowes

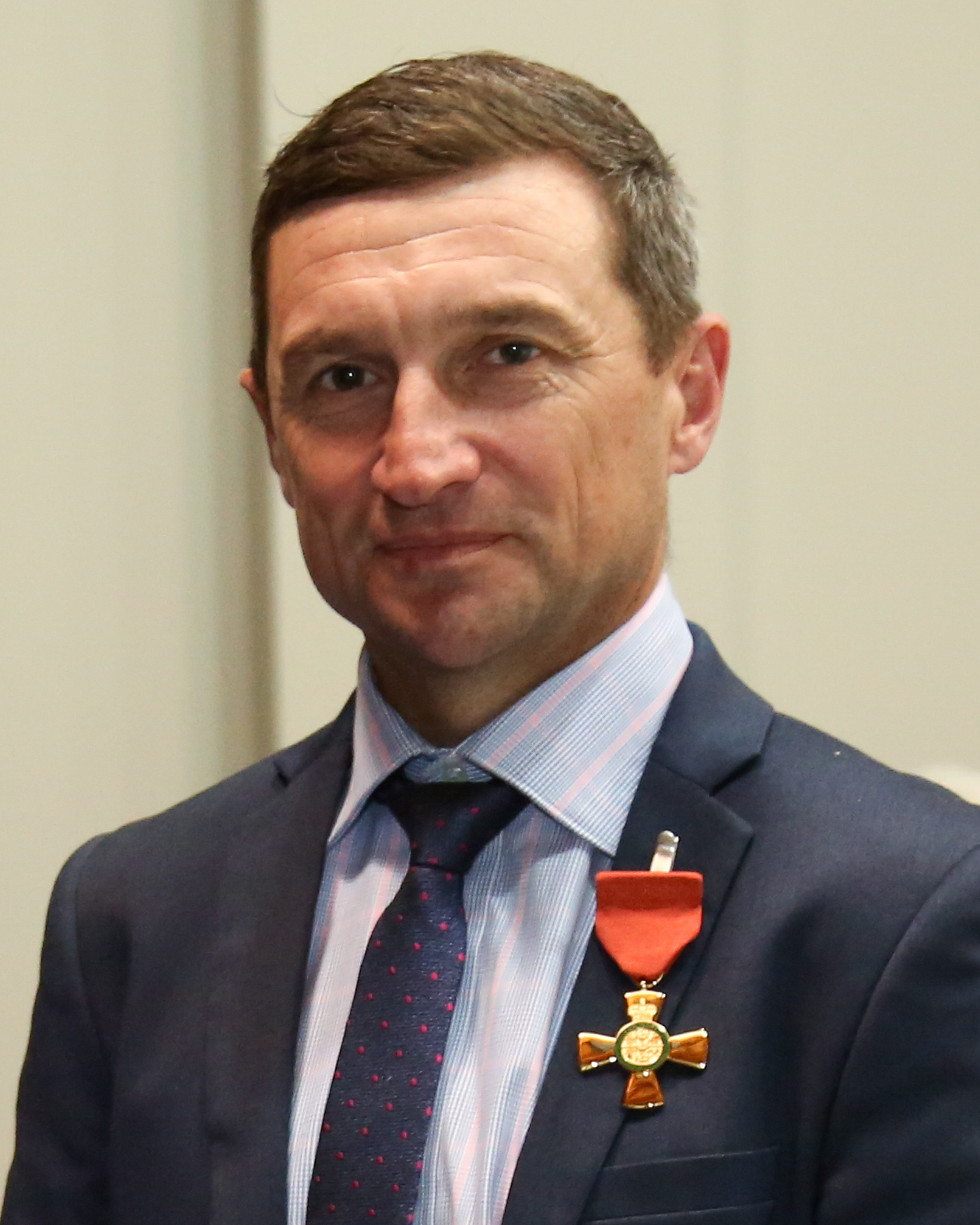
Opie Bosson

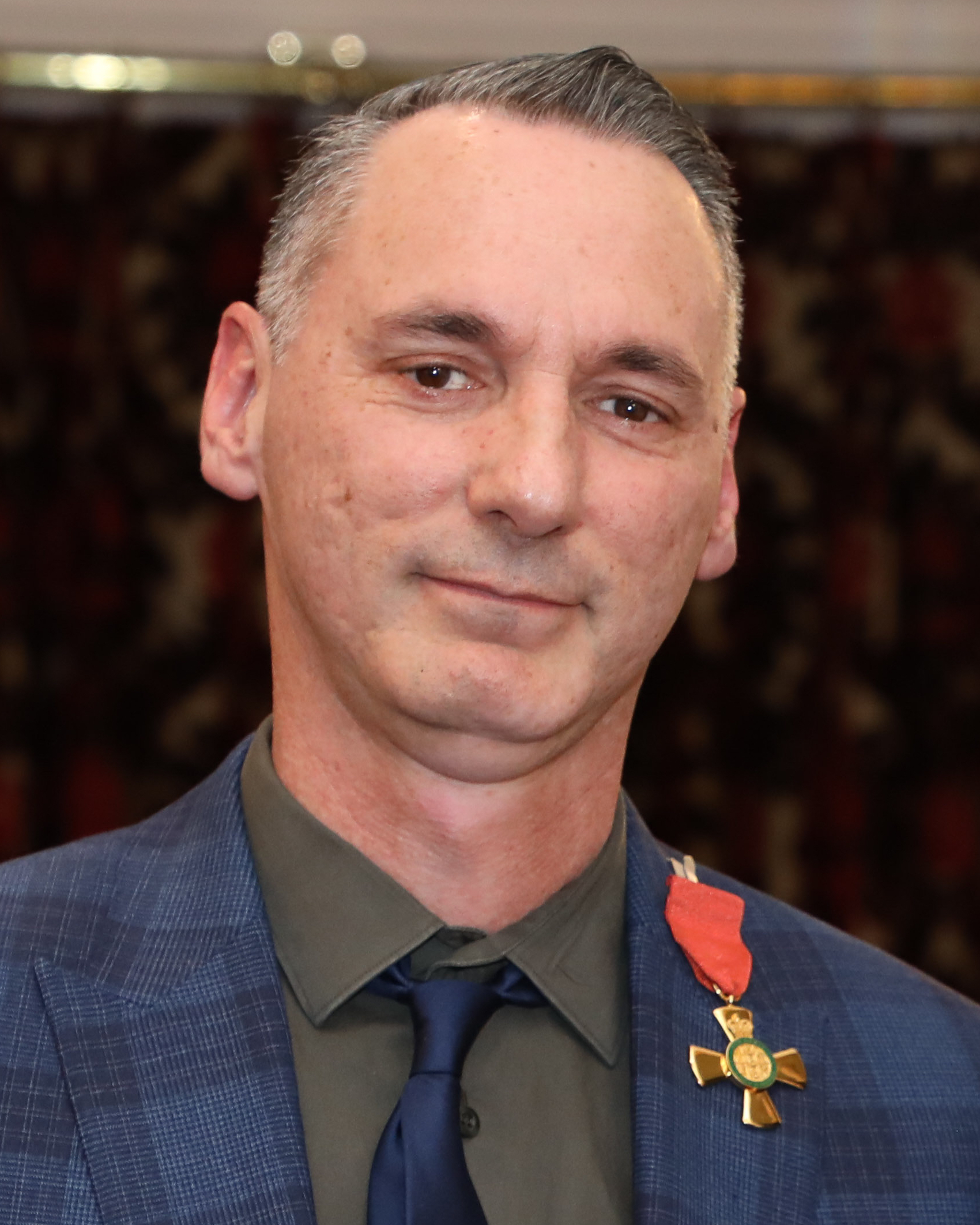
Karl Chitham

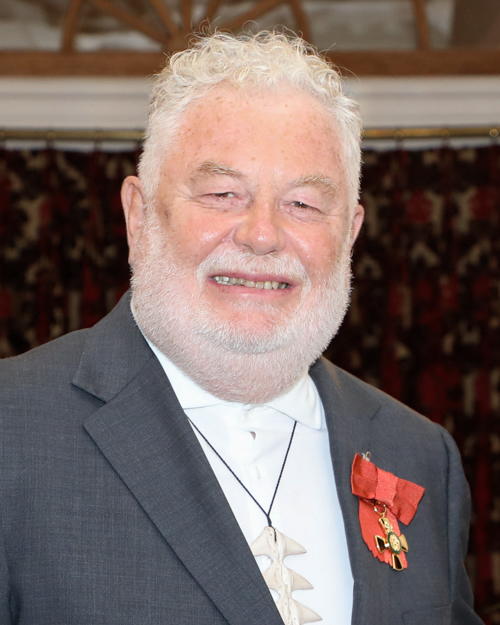
Philip Clarke

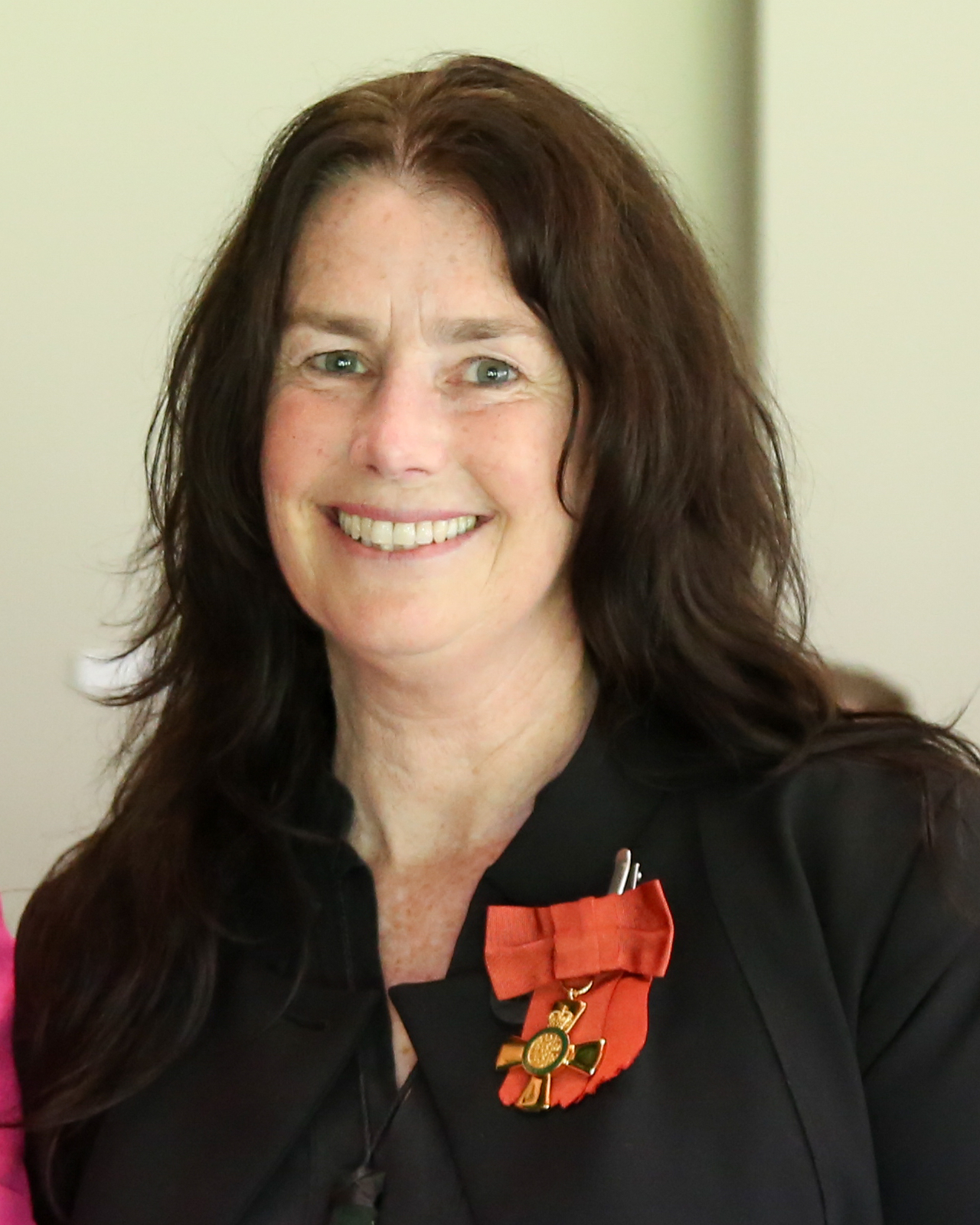
Rochelle Constantine

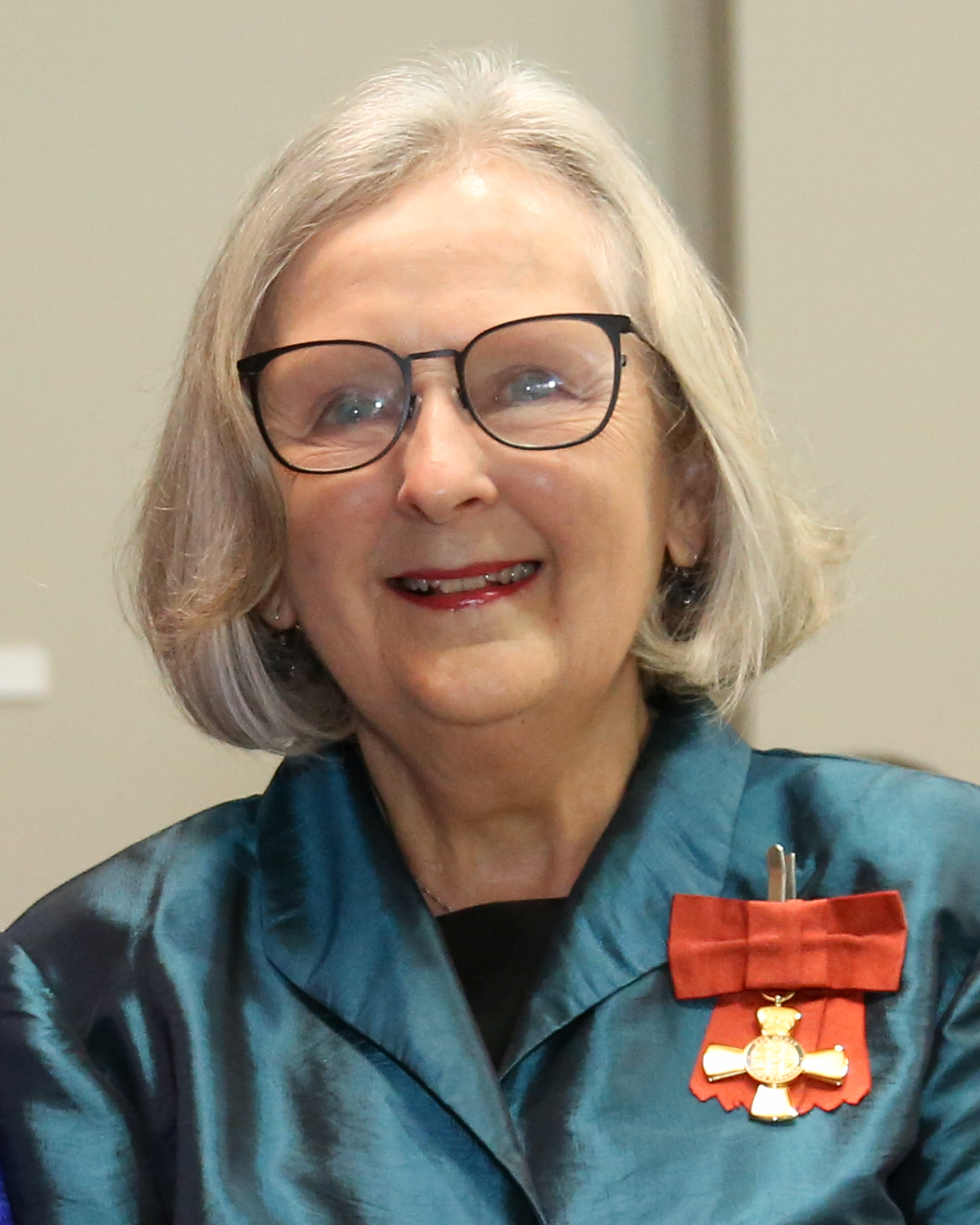
Joyce Cowan

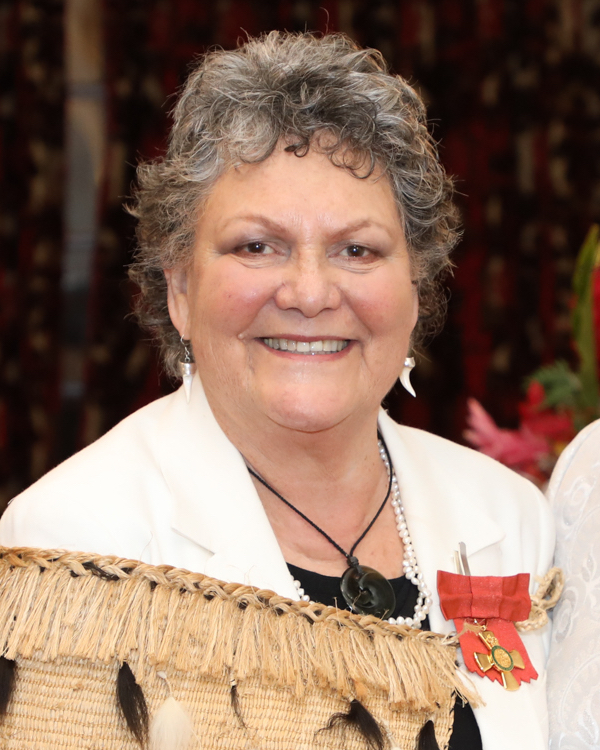
Ria Earp

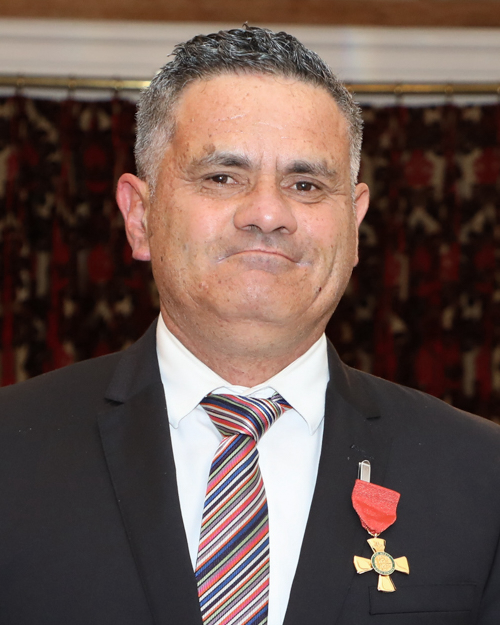
Will Edwards

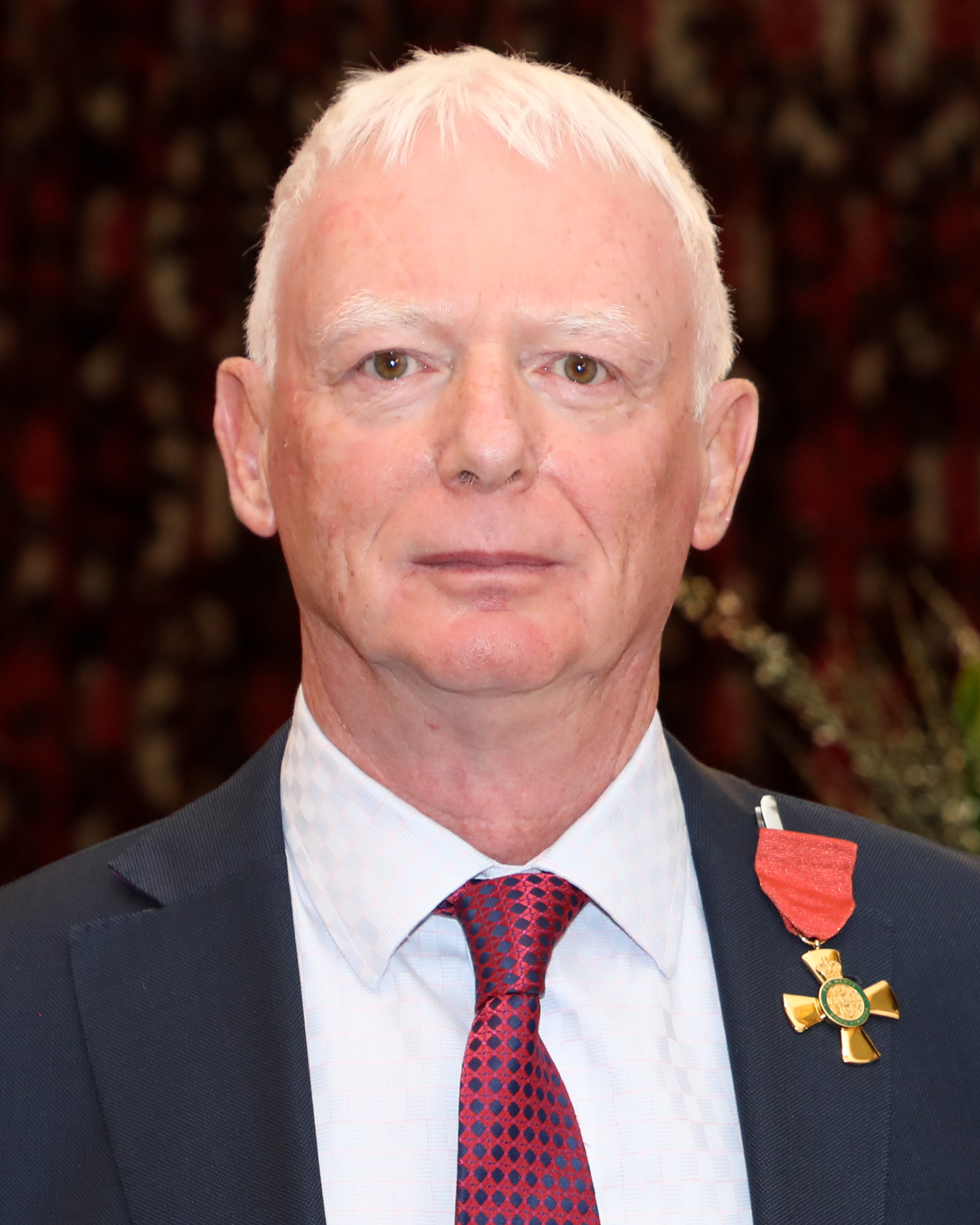
Peter Flanagan

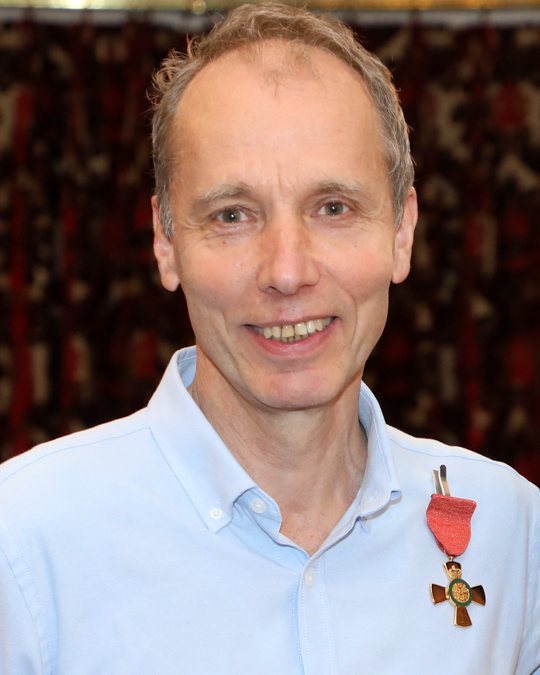
Nicky Hager

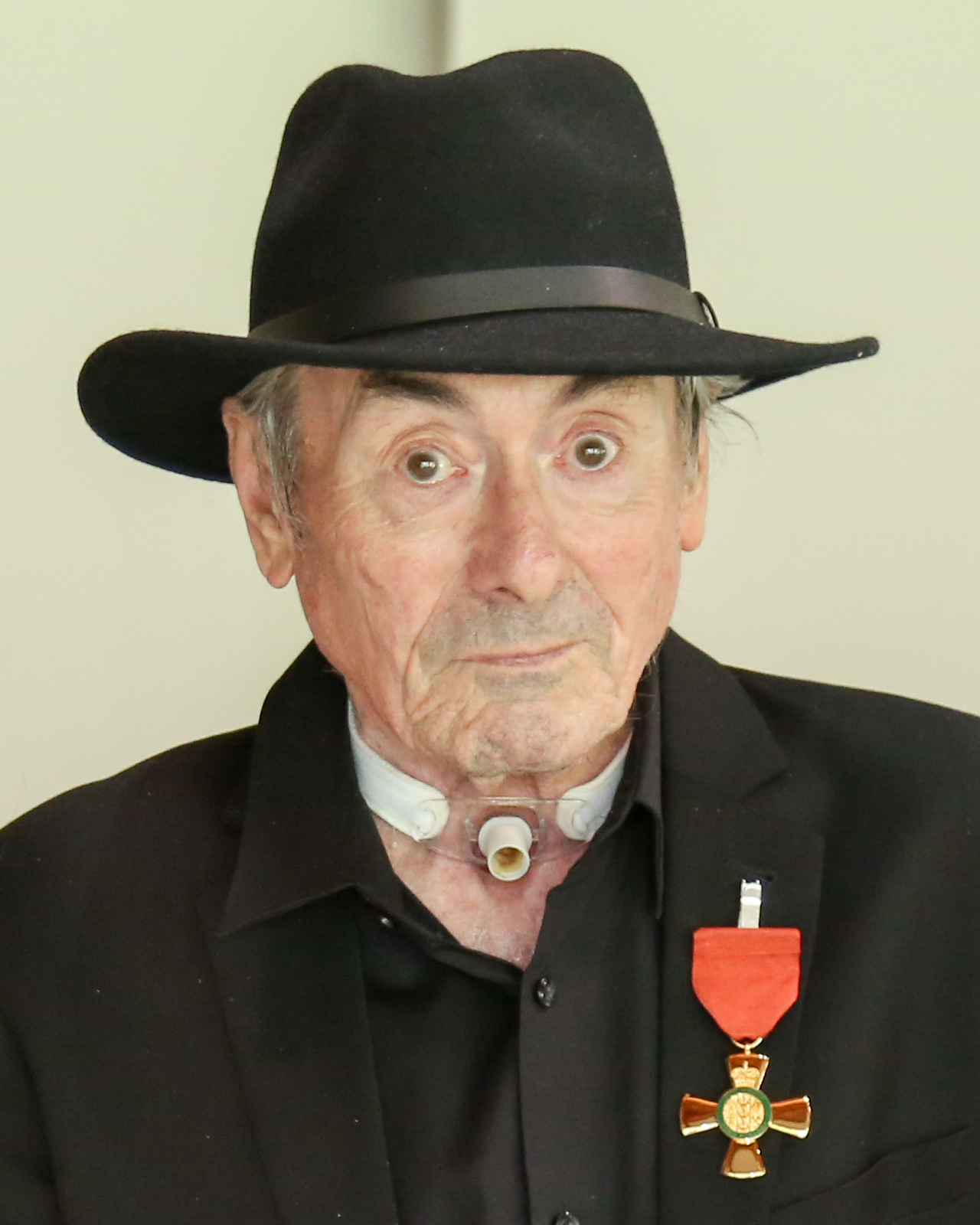
Doug Hood

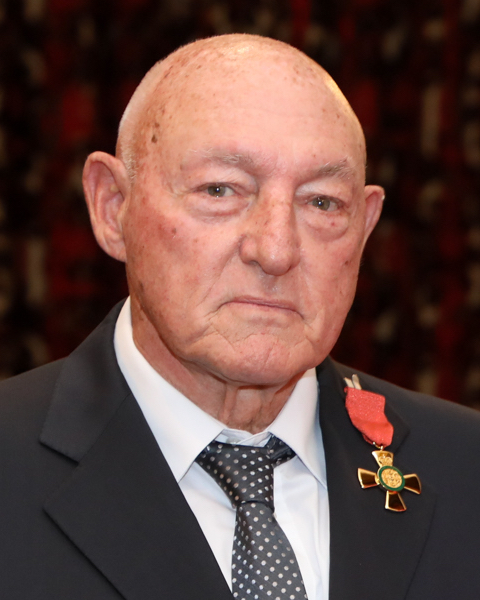
Colin Jones

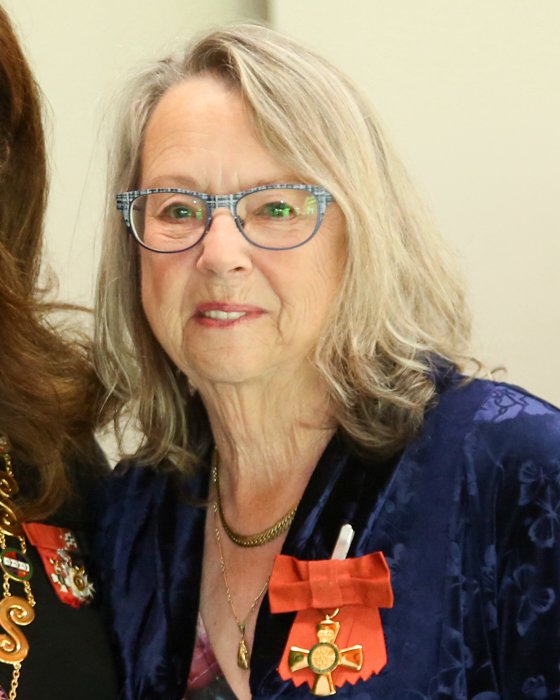
Shirley Jülich

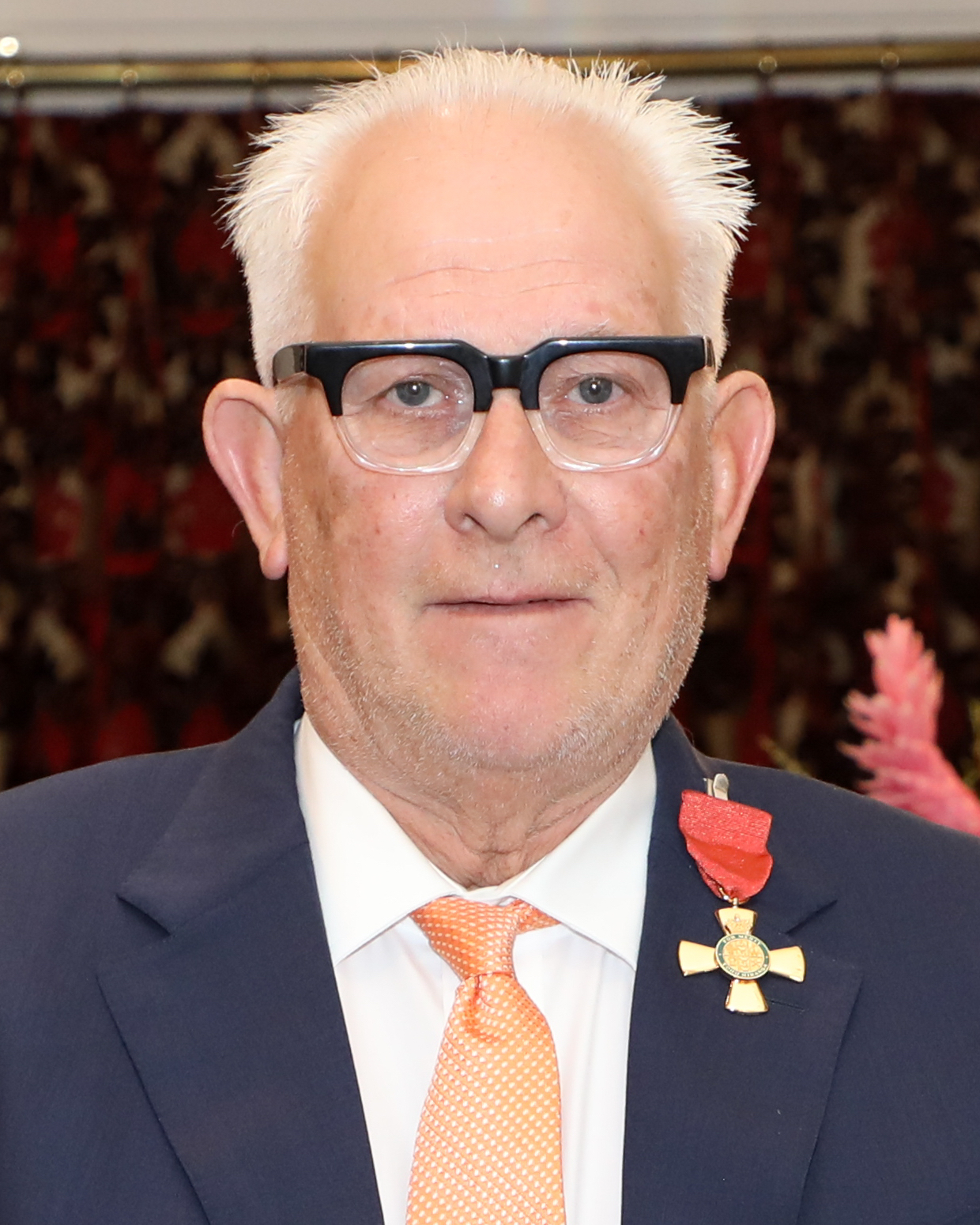
Michael Klaassen

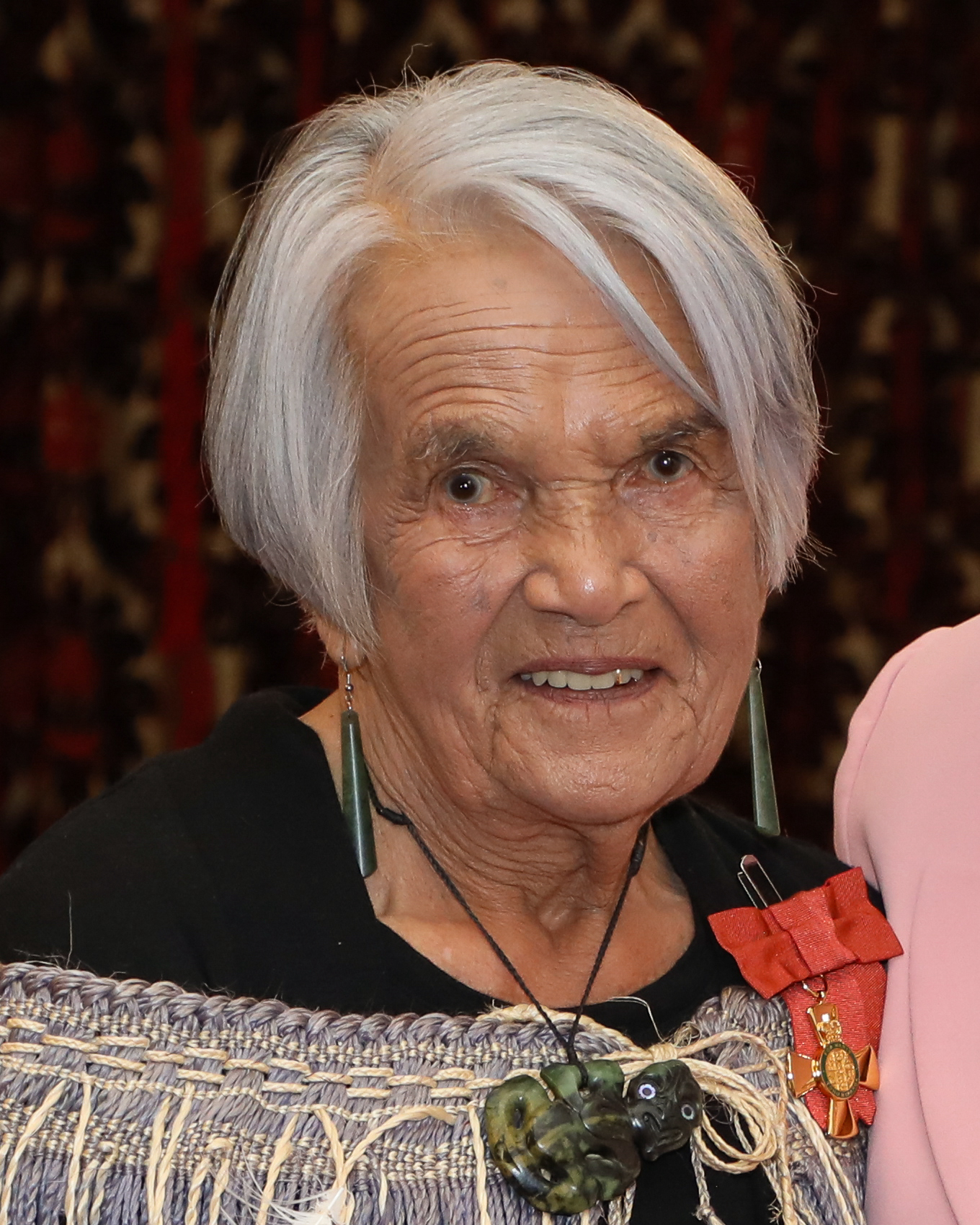
Matekino Lawless

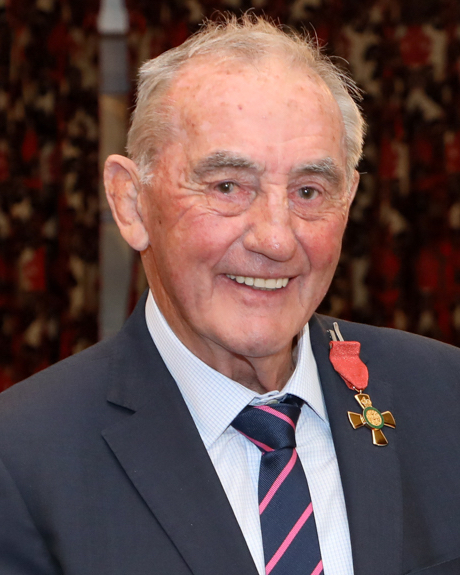
Andy Leslie

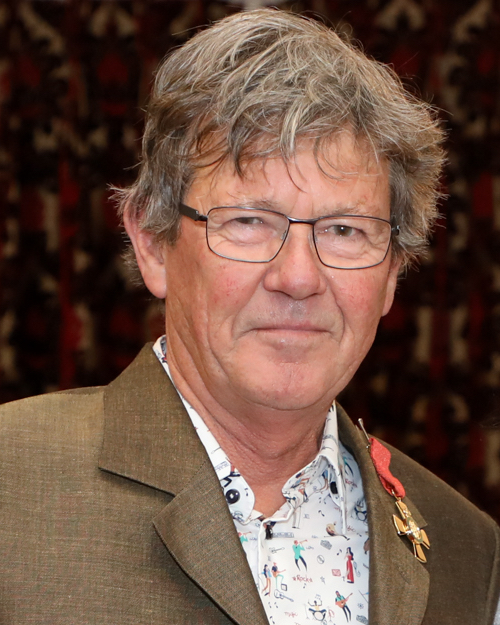
Chris Maclean

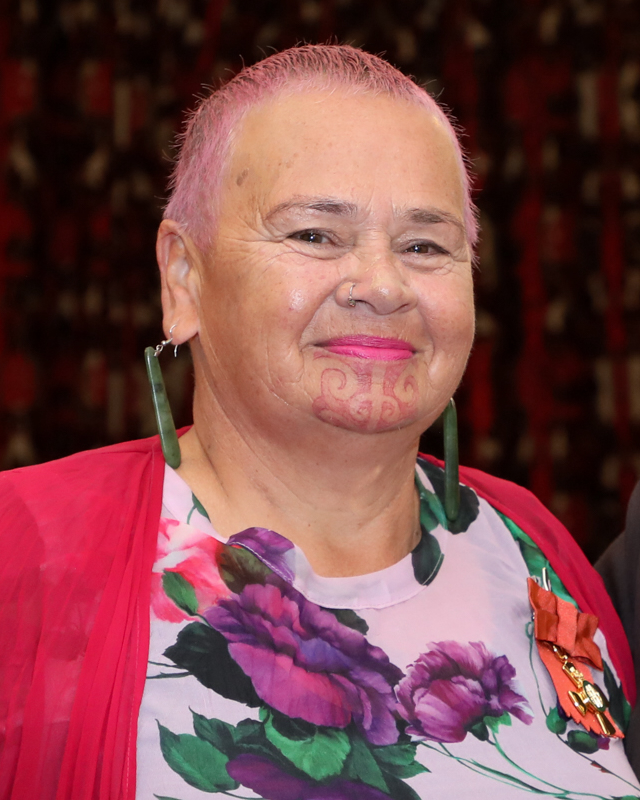
Materoa Mar

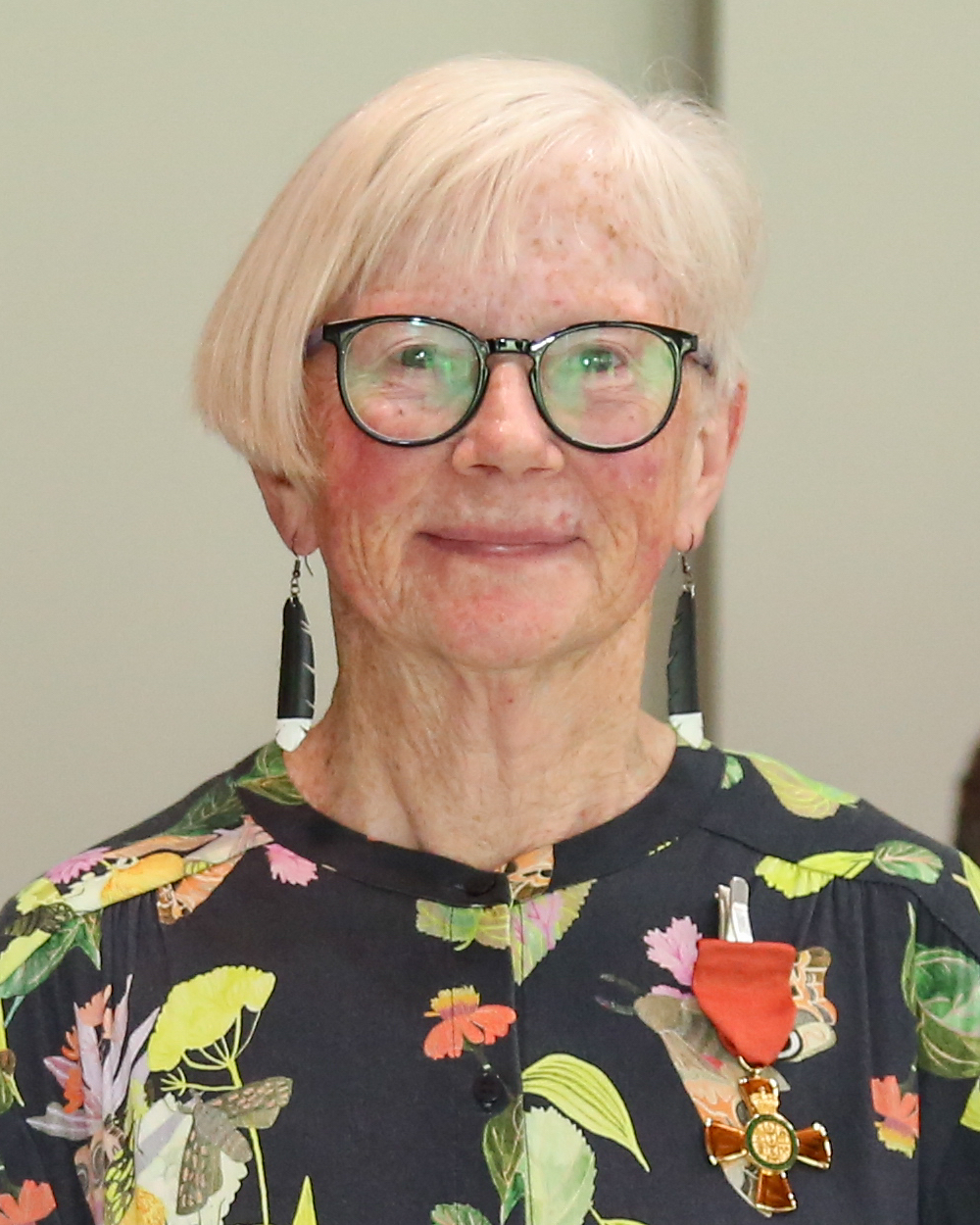
Sandra Morris

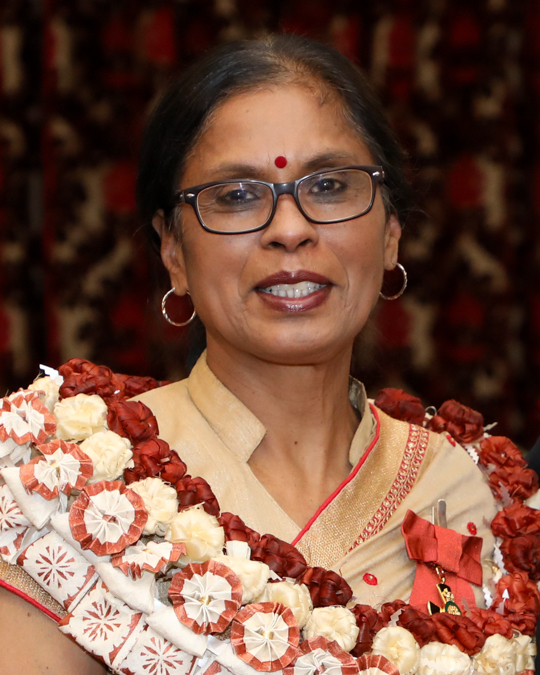
Sunita Narayan

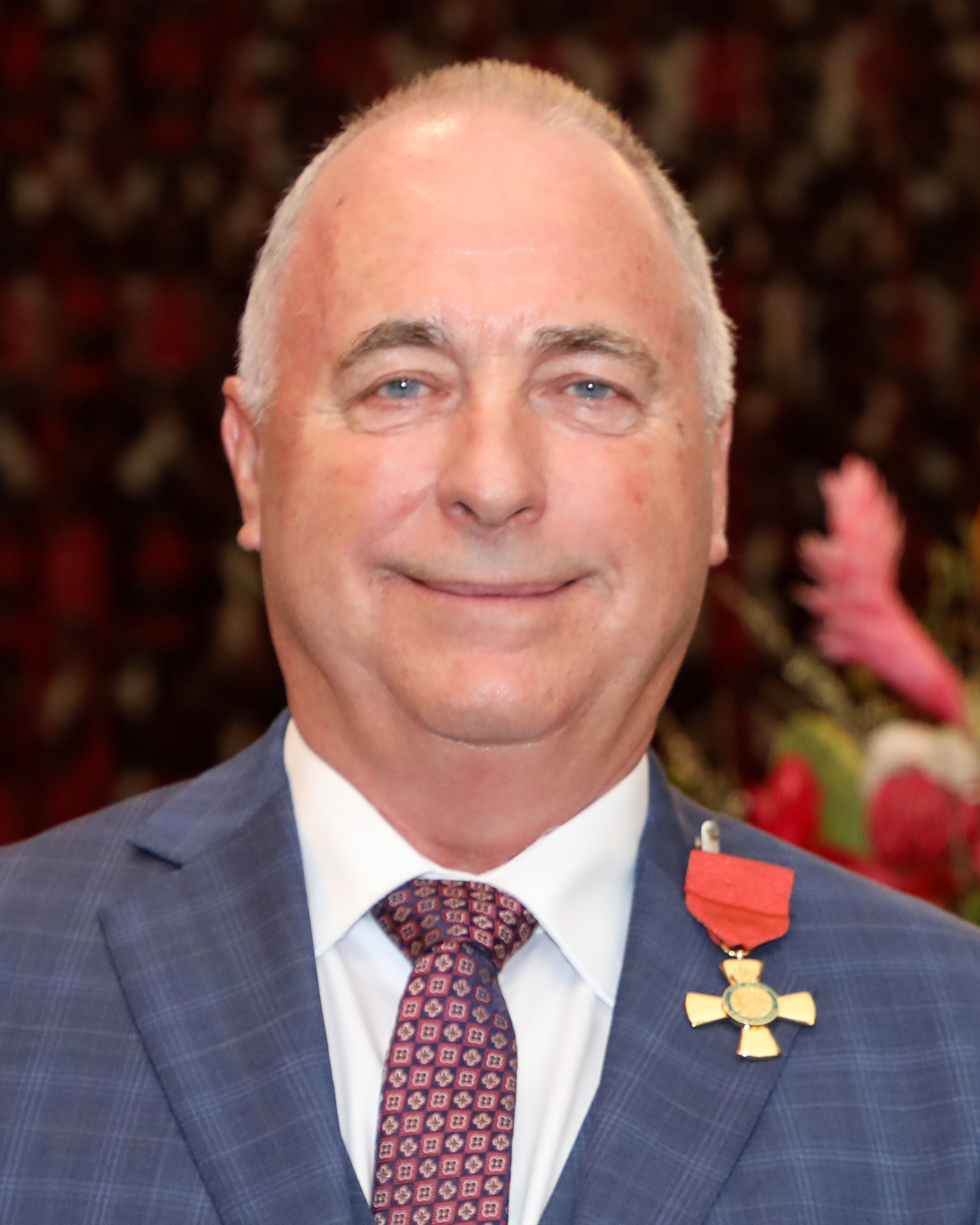
Wayne Norrie

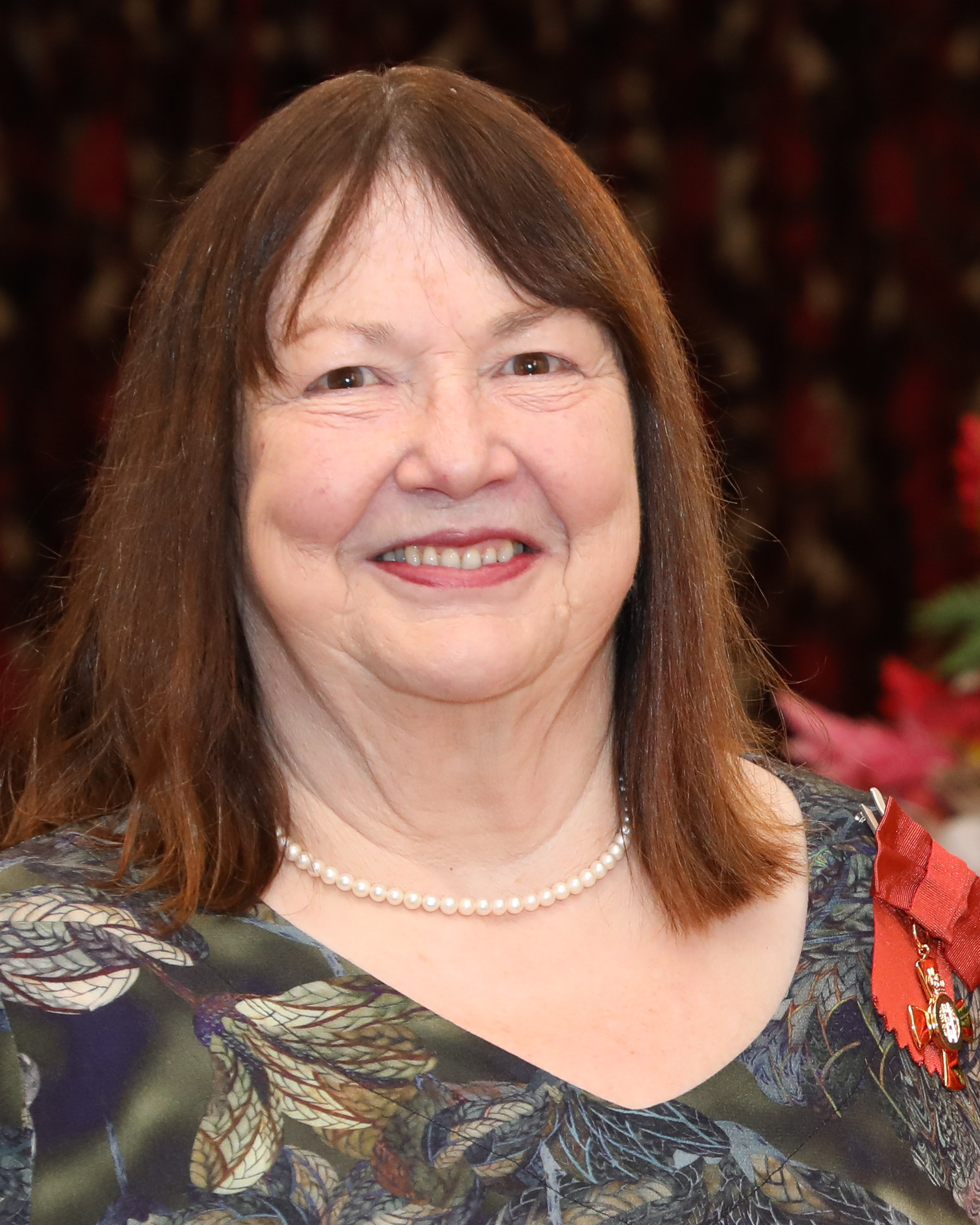
Alison Rich

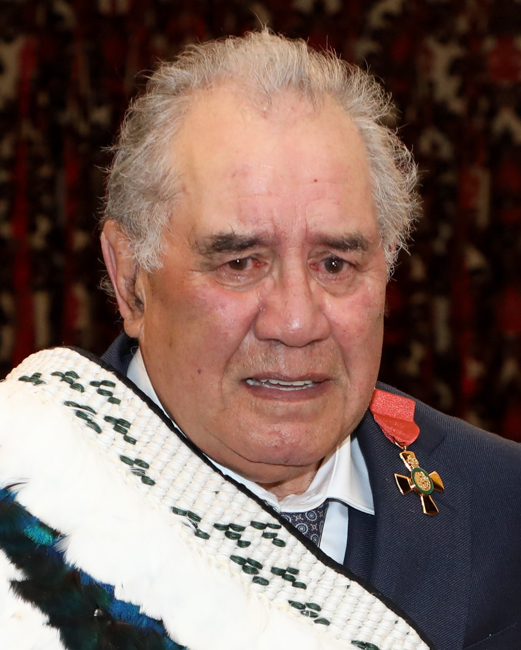
Jack Rikihana

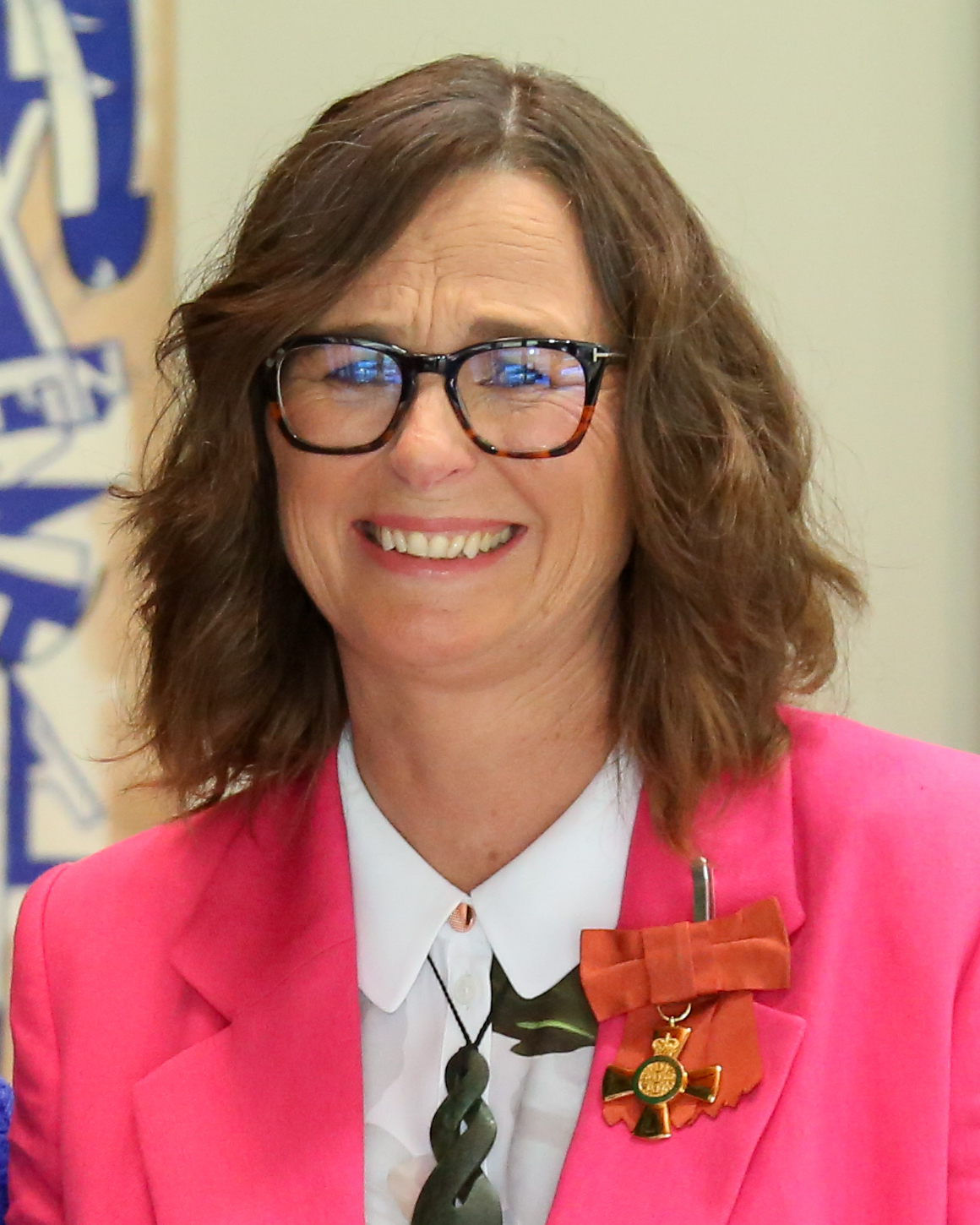
Shae Ronald

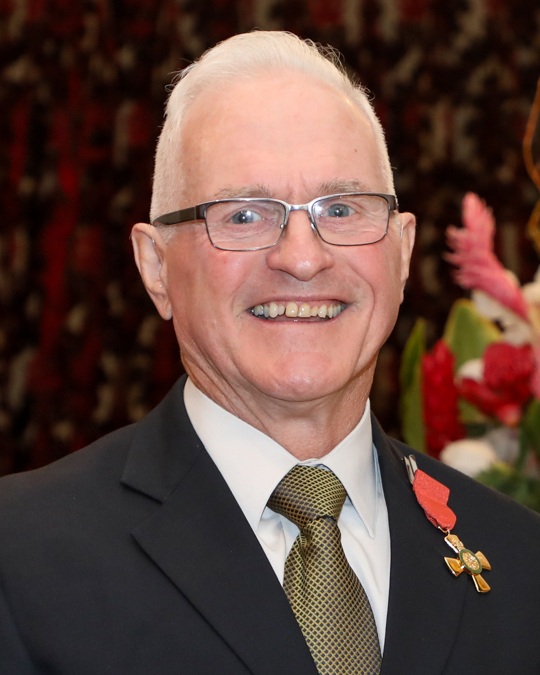
Bruce Russell

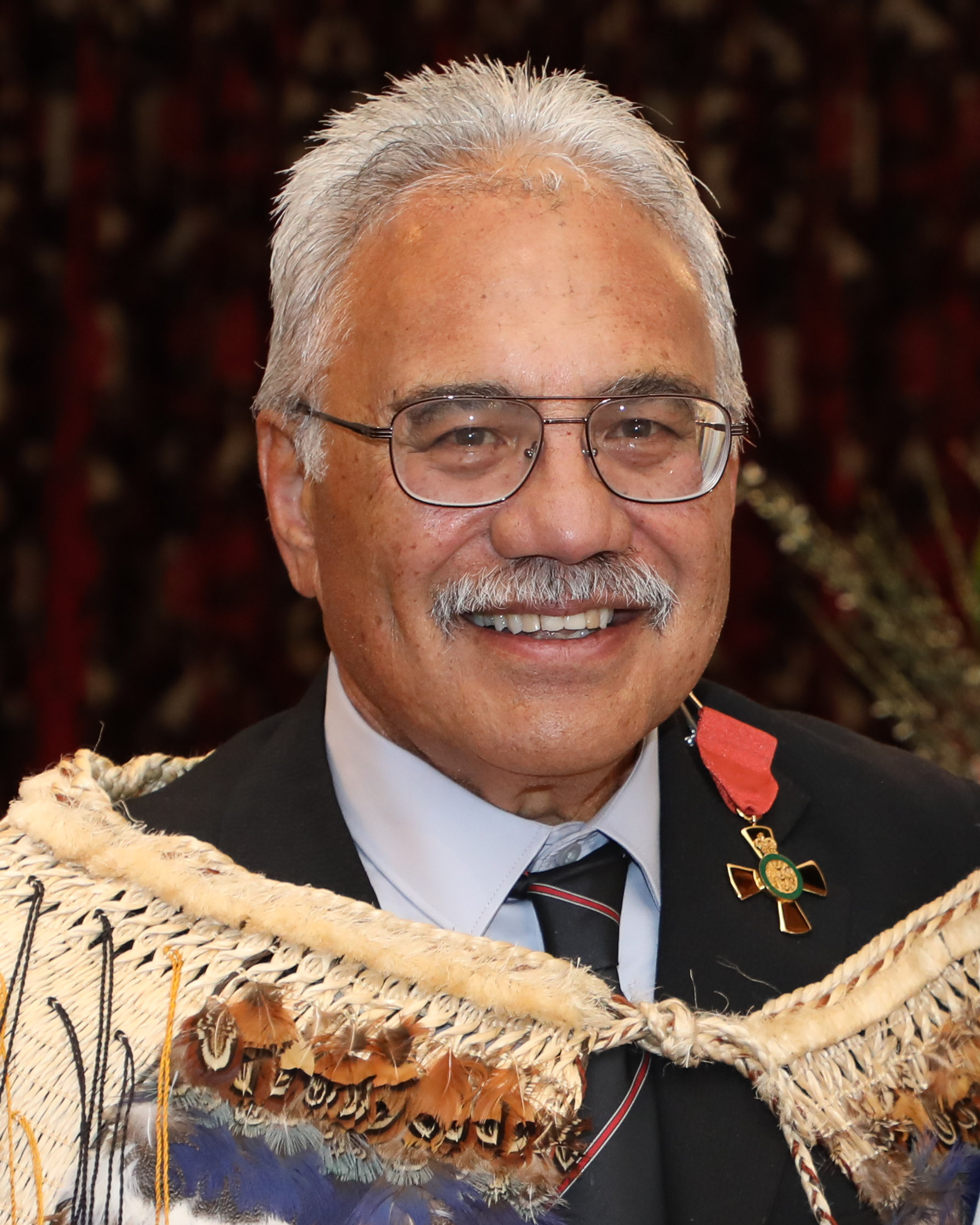
Jim Schuster

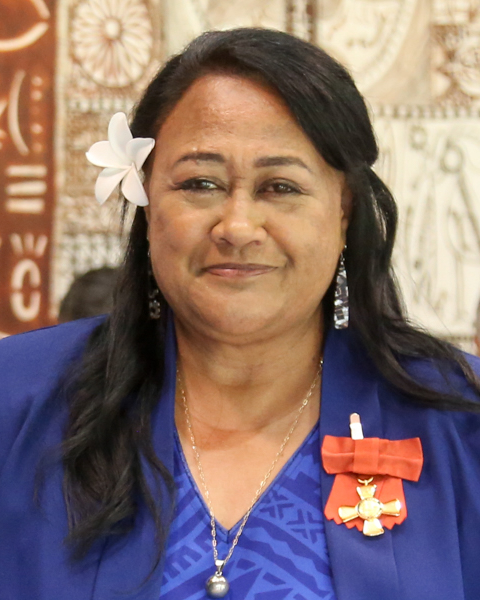
Nua Semuā Silipa

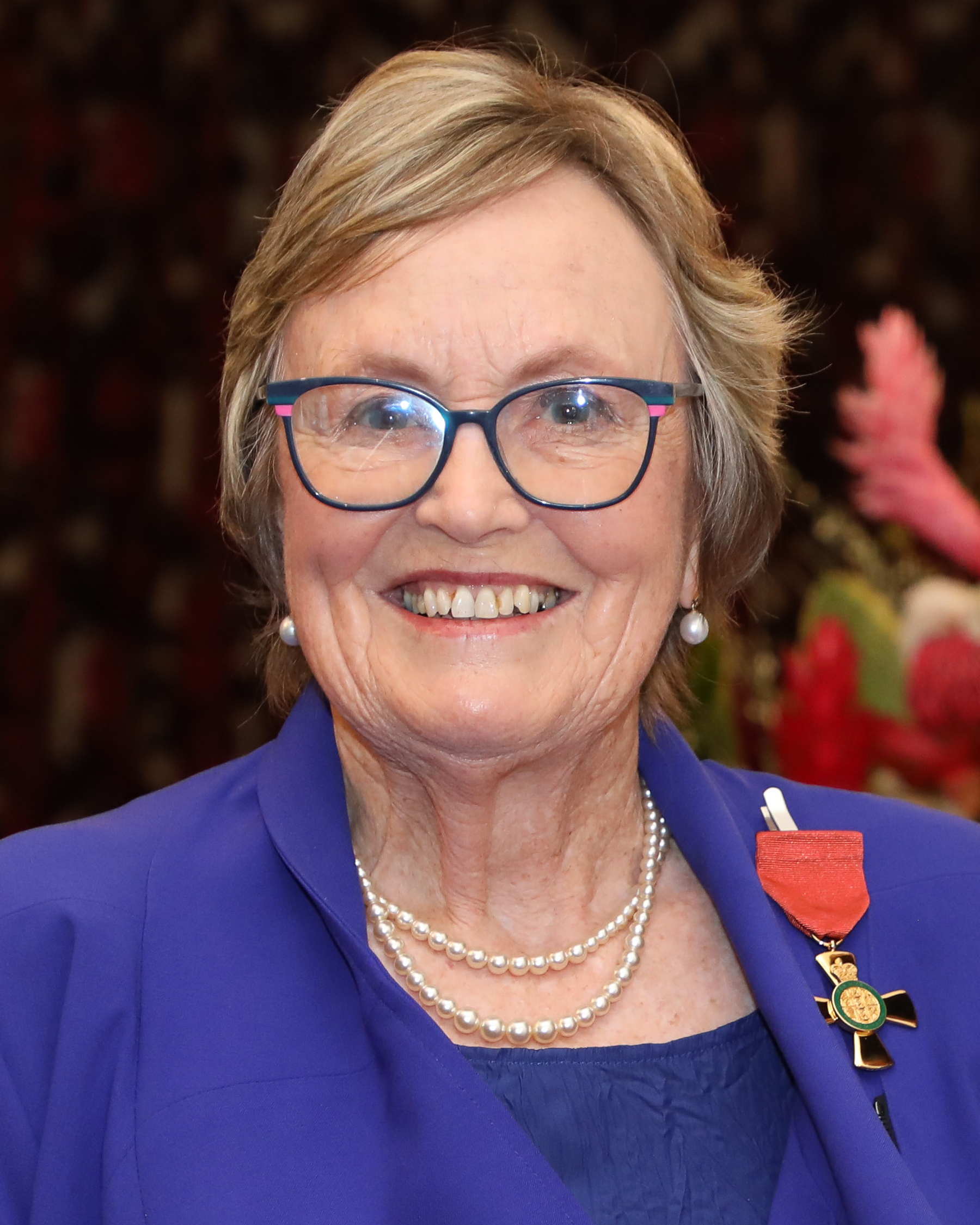
Sue Sutherland

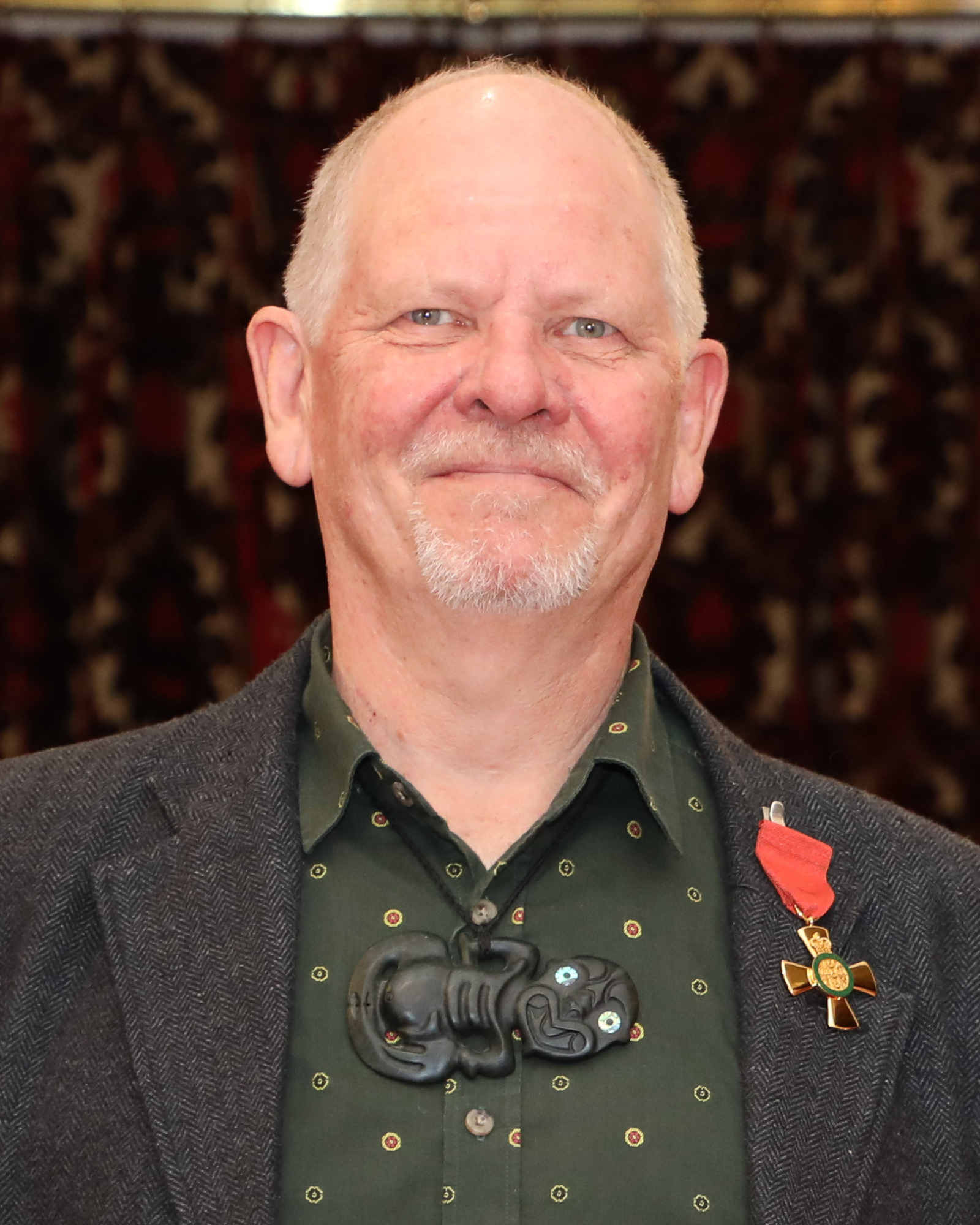
John Taylor

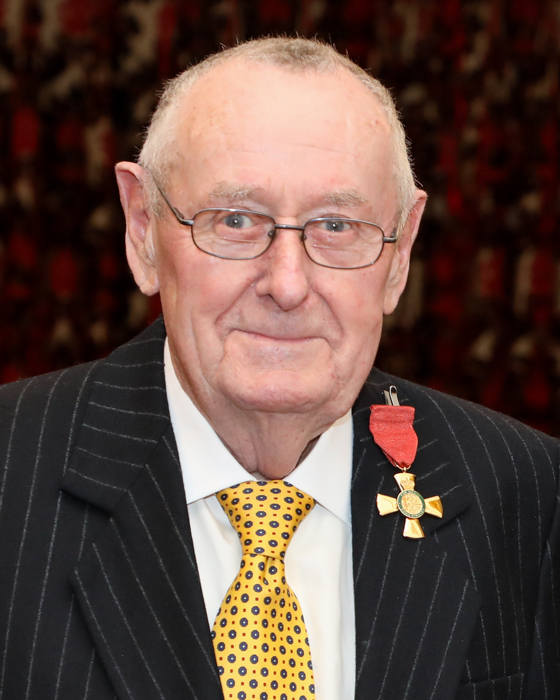
Peter Taylor

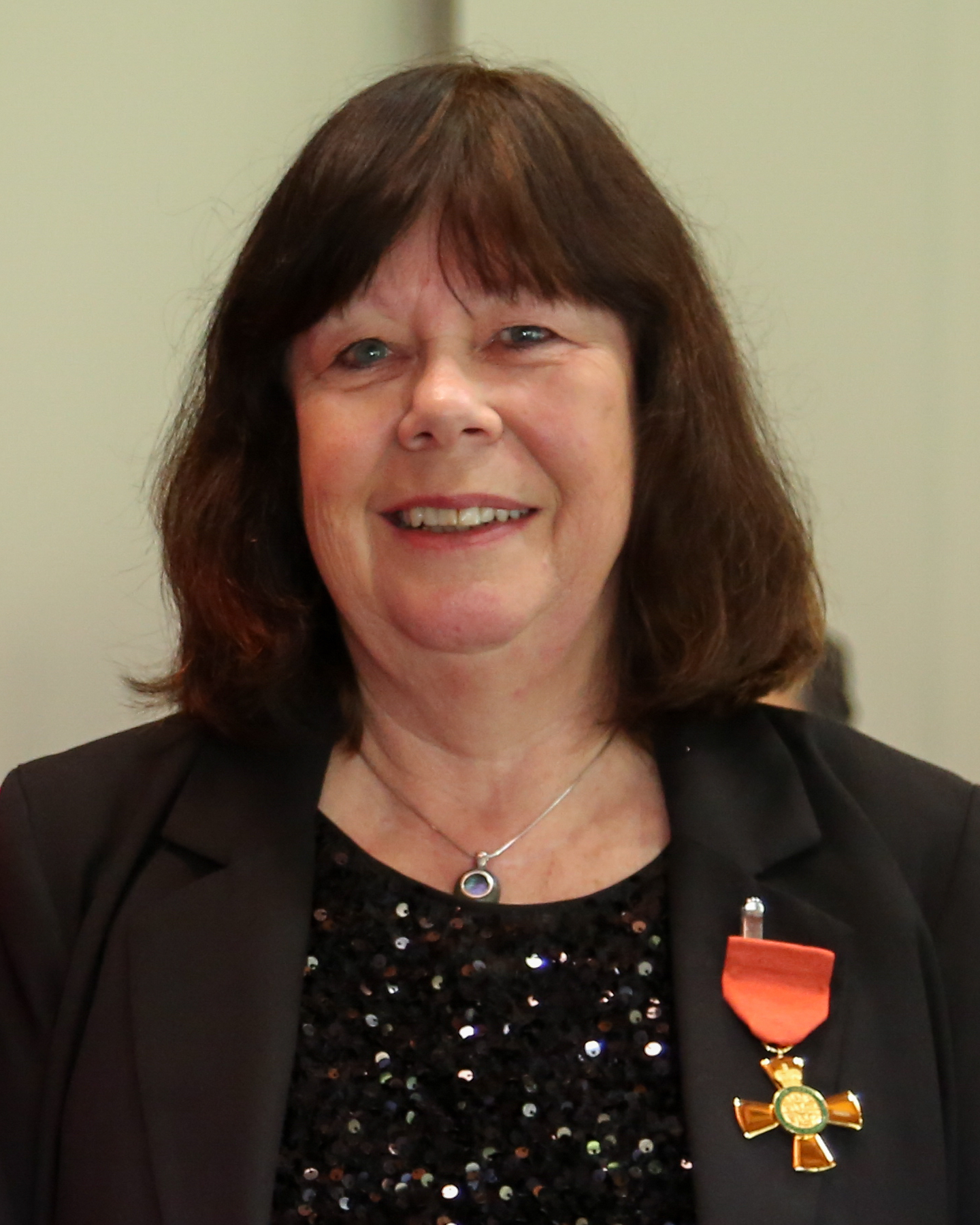
Lynette Tippett

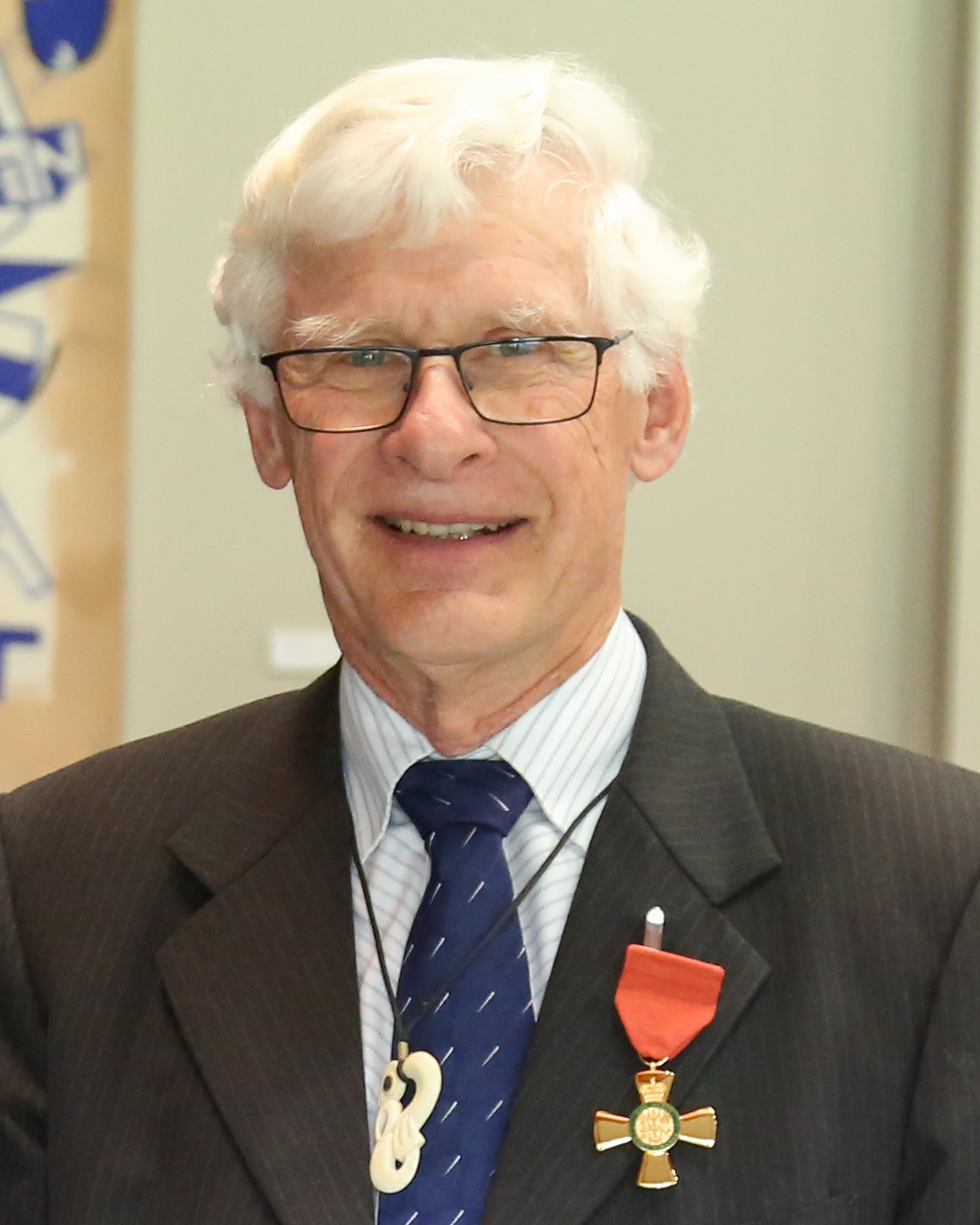
David Towns

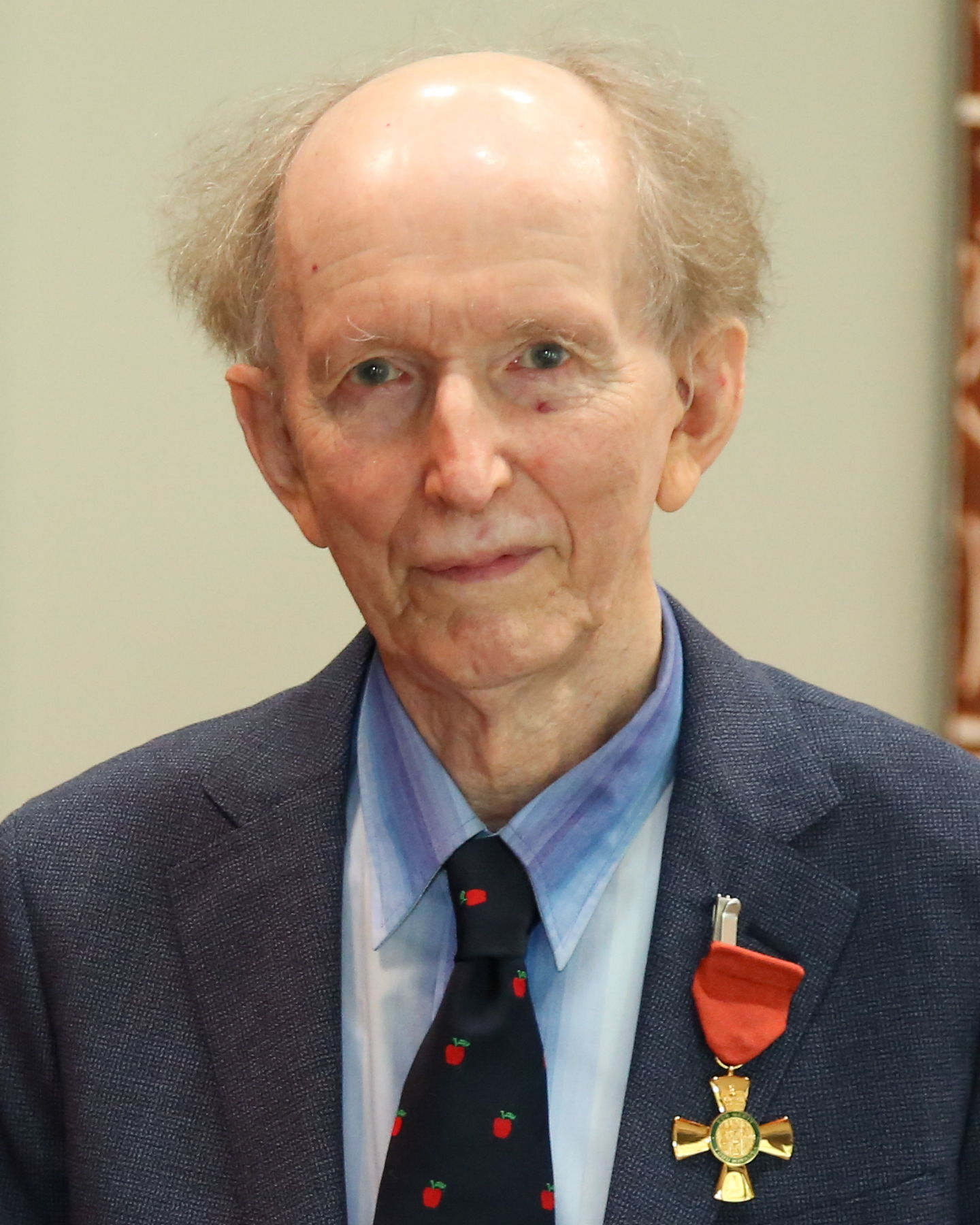
Howard Wearing

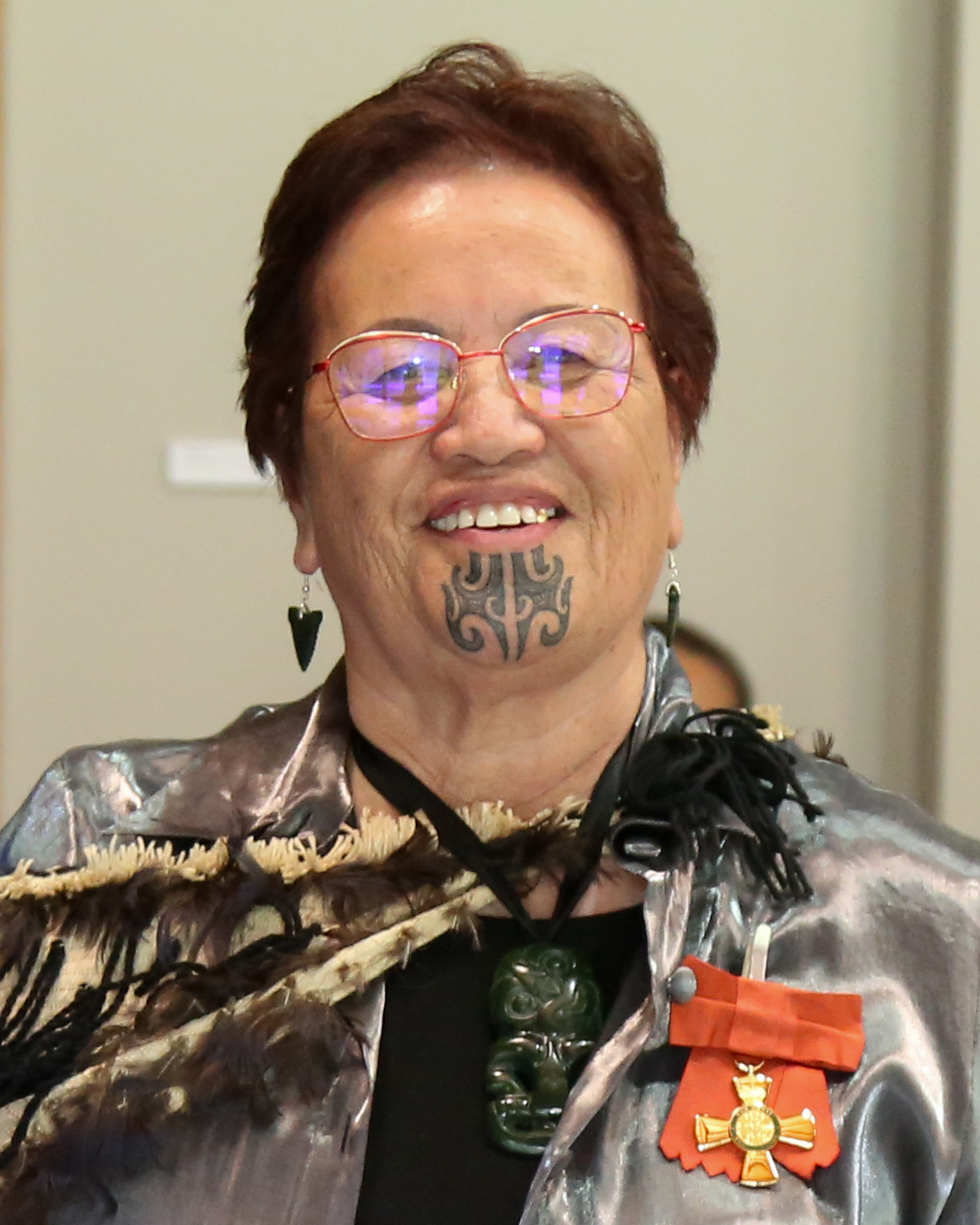
Te Maari Whare

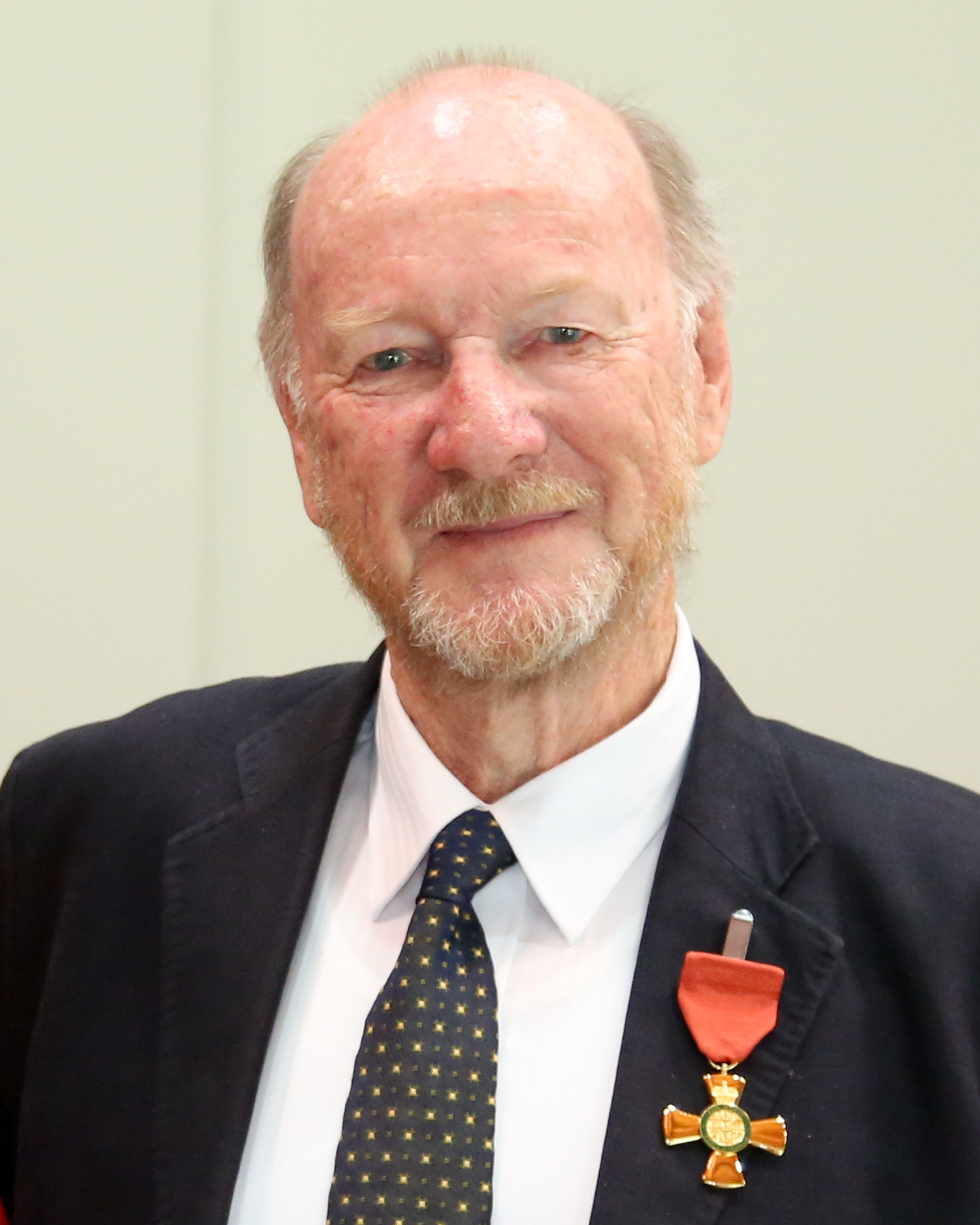
Paul Williams

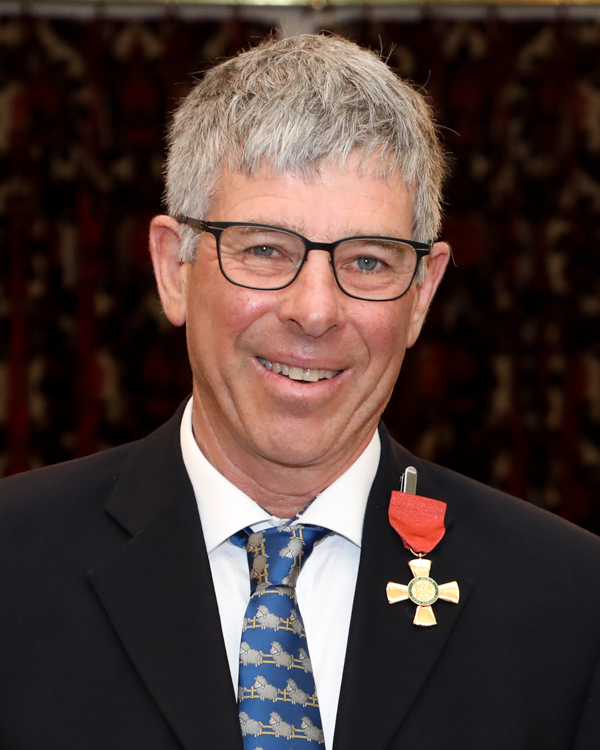
Steve Wyn-Harris

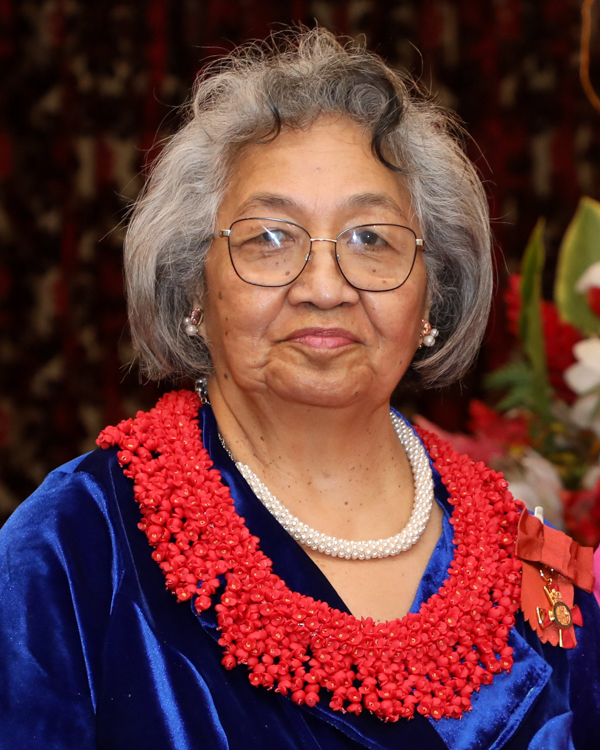
Meleane Pau'uvale

=== Member (MNZM) ===
- Mary Puatuki Aue – of Auckland. For services to education, technology and Pacific and Māori communities.
- Ronald Tuakana Baker – of Auckland. For services to Māori mental health.
- Shanelle Kay Barrett – of Taupō. For services to triathlon.
- Victoria Jane Blood – of Auckland. For services to the entertainment industry.
- Yvonne Annette Browning – of Invercargill. For services to education and youth.
- Simon Alexander Challies – of Christchurch. For services to people with neurological conditions.
- Kendal Judee Collins – of Auckland. For services to youth.
- John Ido De Bernardo – of Wellington. For services to the plumbing and gas industries. (Note: Deceased. His Majesty's approval of this award took effect on 17 April 2023, prior to the date of death.)
- Devon Ruahei Demant – of Auckland. For services to rugby.
- Dr Ofanaite Ana Dewes – of Auckland. For services to health and the Pacific community.
- Bryce Robert Dinneen – of Tauranga. For services to disabled people.
- Ann Violet Dunphy – of Auckland. For services to youth and education.
- Joy Dunsheath JP – of Wellington. For services to human rights, women and education.
- Gerald Peter Dwyer – of Kaiapoi. For services to rowing.
- Fa'atili Iosua Esera – of Wellington. For services to Pacific education.
- Margaret Mary Eyre – of Auckland. For services to business and the community.
- Toalele Len Faneva – of Kerikeri. For services to Māori.
- Dr Siale Alokihakau Foliaki – of Auckland. For services to mental health and the Pacific community.
- Loloma Foster – of Hamilton. For services to race walking.
- David Alexander Haig – of Nelson. For services to woodworking.
- Jeanette Sherilyn Hall – of Tauranga. For services to highland dancing.
- Gerard Anthony Hanning – of Dunedin. For services to education and the community.
- Michelle Louise Hooper – of Waiheke Island. For services to sports.
- Warren Graham Jack – of Auckland. For services to the community.
- Ian Leslie James – of Upper Hutt. For services to the community.
- Peter John Kaiser – of Auckland. For services to education.
- Sergeant Walter Wallace Kopae – of Wellington. For services to the New Zealand Police and the community.
- Gwendolyn Audrey Alexis LewGor – of Rotorua. For services to ethnic communities.
- Charlotte Anne Lockhart – of Waiheke Island. For services to business and philanthropy.
- Qiane May Matata-Sipu – of Auckland. For services to the arts.
- Stacey Victoria Mendonca – of Wellington. For services to women.
- Lynette Evelyn Milne – of Wānaka. For services to the arts.
- Tara Lai-Ianne Moala – of Auckland. For services to the community and environment.
- Keni Upokotea Moeroa JP – of Dunedin. For services to the Cook Islands community.
- Superintendent Rakesh Sharanund Naidoo – of Wellington. For services to the New Zealand Police and ethnic communities.
- Andrea Kate Nelson – of Auckland. For services to sport.
- Malcolm Charles Nicolson – of Kawakawa. For services to local government and the community.
- Barry Thomas Pickering – of Lower Hutt. For services to football.
- Victor Lewys Pirihi – of Auckland. For services to golf and Māori.
- Reverend Thomas Tamati Hemi Poata – of Rotorua. For services to Māori and the community.
- Helen Teiarere Rawiri – of Takanini. For services to Māori language education.
- Christine Margaret Richardson – of Wellington. For services to Special Olympics and the community.
- Anna Victoria Rogers – of Christchurch. For services to literature.
- Nicola Ann Saker (Lady O’Regan) – of Wellington. For services to heritage preservation and the arts.
- Amy Ella Satterthwaite – of Prebbleton. For services to cricket.
- Derek Monty Shaw – of Nelson. For services to the environment, local government and athletics.
- Kennedy Wailer Simon – of Hamilton. For services to rugby.
- John Edward Sims – of Auckland. For services to karate.
- Dr Susan (Huhana) Margaret Smith – of Wellington. For services to the environment.
- Franklin Manu Solomon – of Auckland. For services to education, particularly Māori and Pacific education.
- Judith Anne Solomon – of Auckland. For services to education, particularly Māori and Pacific education.
- Arthur Graham Sutherland – of Wānaka. For services to outdoor education.
- Awerangi Lorraine Tamihere – of Auckland. For services to Māori health.
- Tofilau Talalelei Senetenari Taufale – of Napier. For services to Pacific health.
- Dr Semisi Pouvalu Taumoepeau – of Auckland. For services to education and tourism.
- Dr Rangituatahi Te Kanawa – of Te Kūiti. For services to Māori art and heritage preservation.
- Robert John Tucker – of New Plymouth. For services to photography and the community.
- Murray Robert Warrington – of Napier. For services to brass bands.
- David John White – of Matamata. For services to the prevention of family violence.
- Dean Douglas Whiting – of Wellington. For services to Māori arts.
- Jacqueline Lesly Williams – of Levin. For services to scouting.
- June Lynette Williamson (Linn Lorkin) – of Auckland. For services to music.
- Kenneth James Wilson – of Wellington. For services to education, research and the economy.
- Kathryn Anne Wood – of Auckland. For services to youth and outdoor education.

Honorary

- Fa'amoana Ioane Luafutu – of Christchurch. For services to arts and the Pacific community.
- Fumiyuki Saijo – of Otaru, Japan. For services to New Zealand–Japan relations.
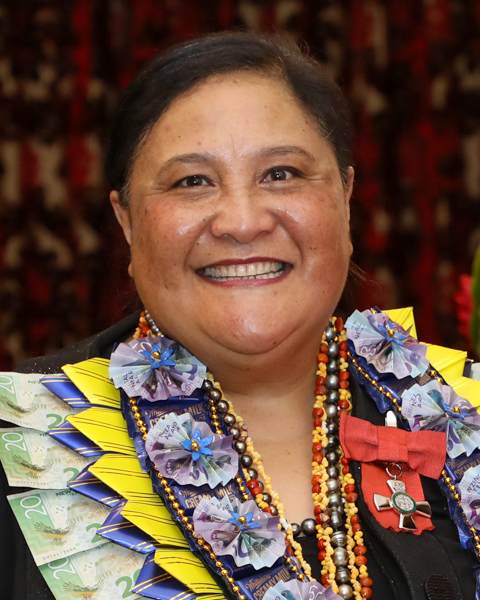
Mary Aue

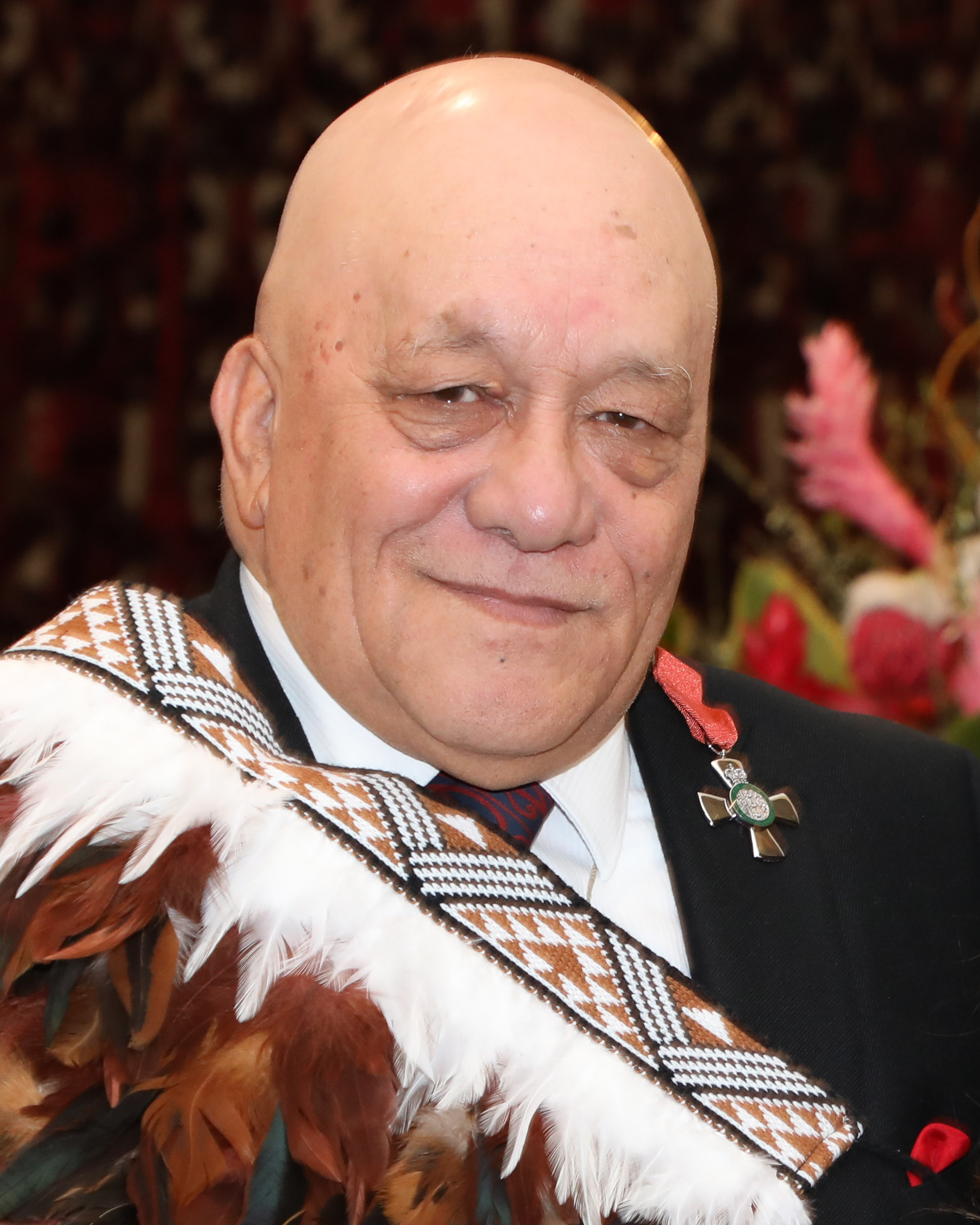
Ron Baker

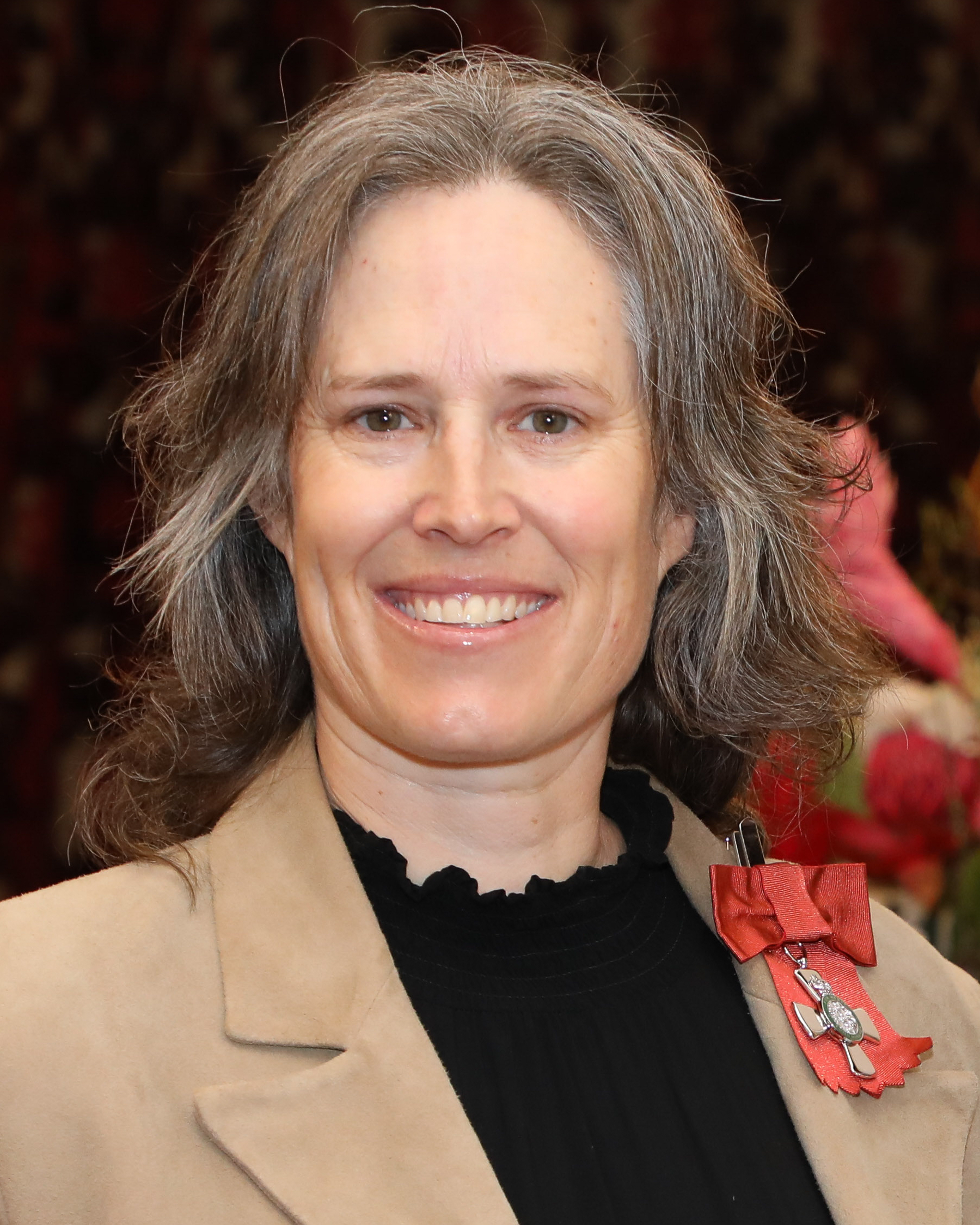
Shanelle Barrett

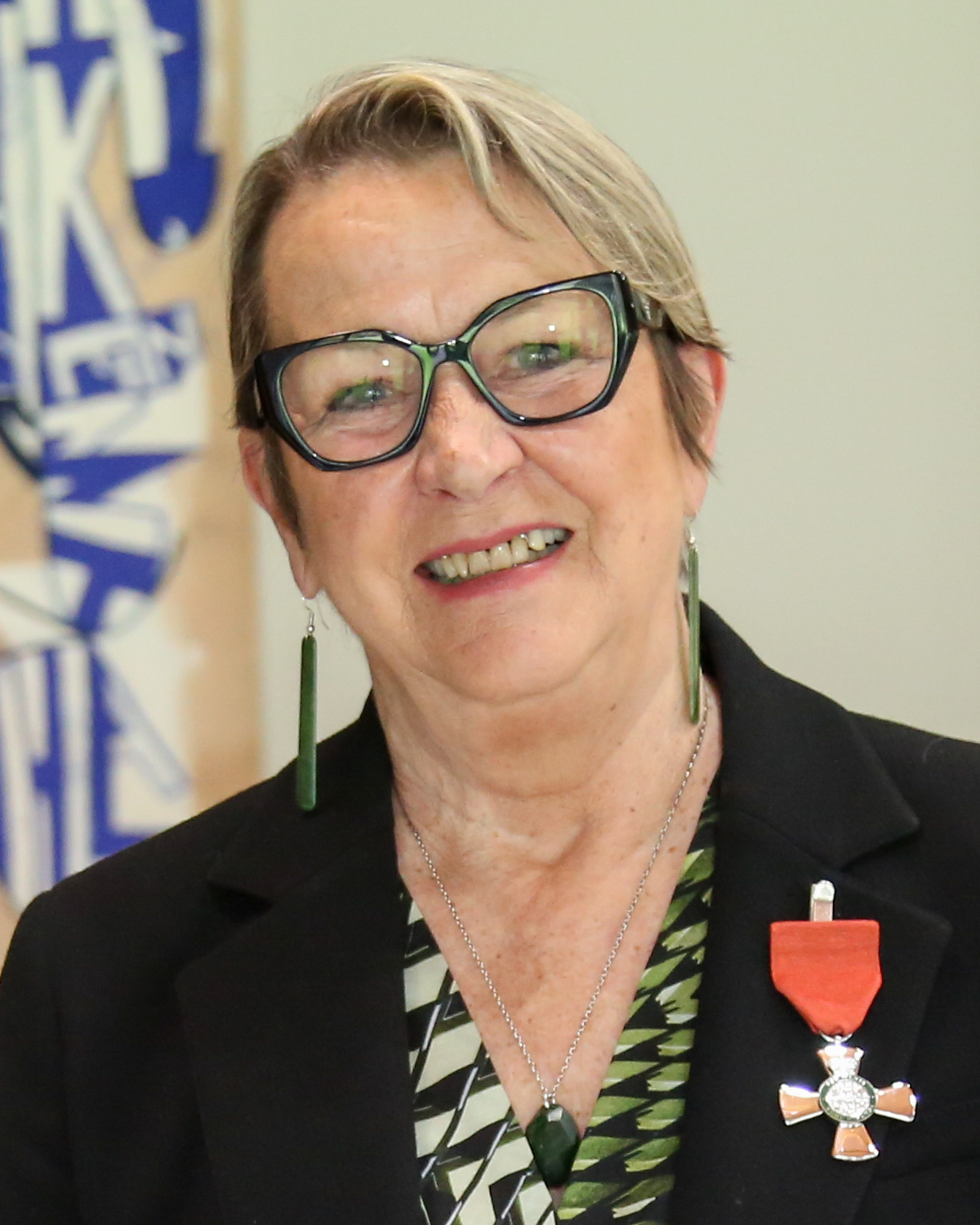
Victoria Blood

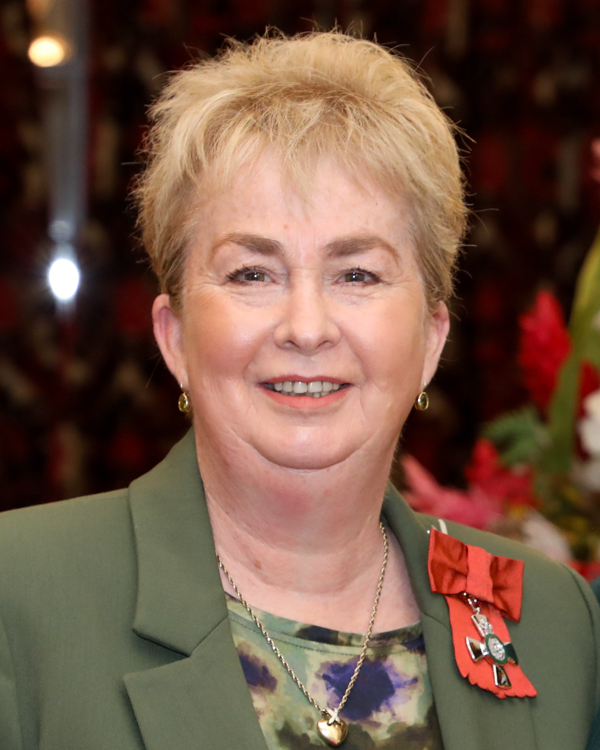
Yvonne Browning

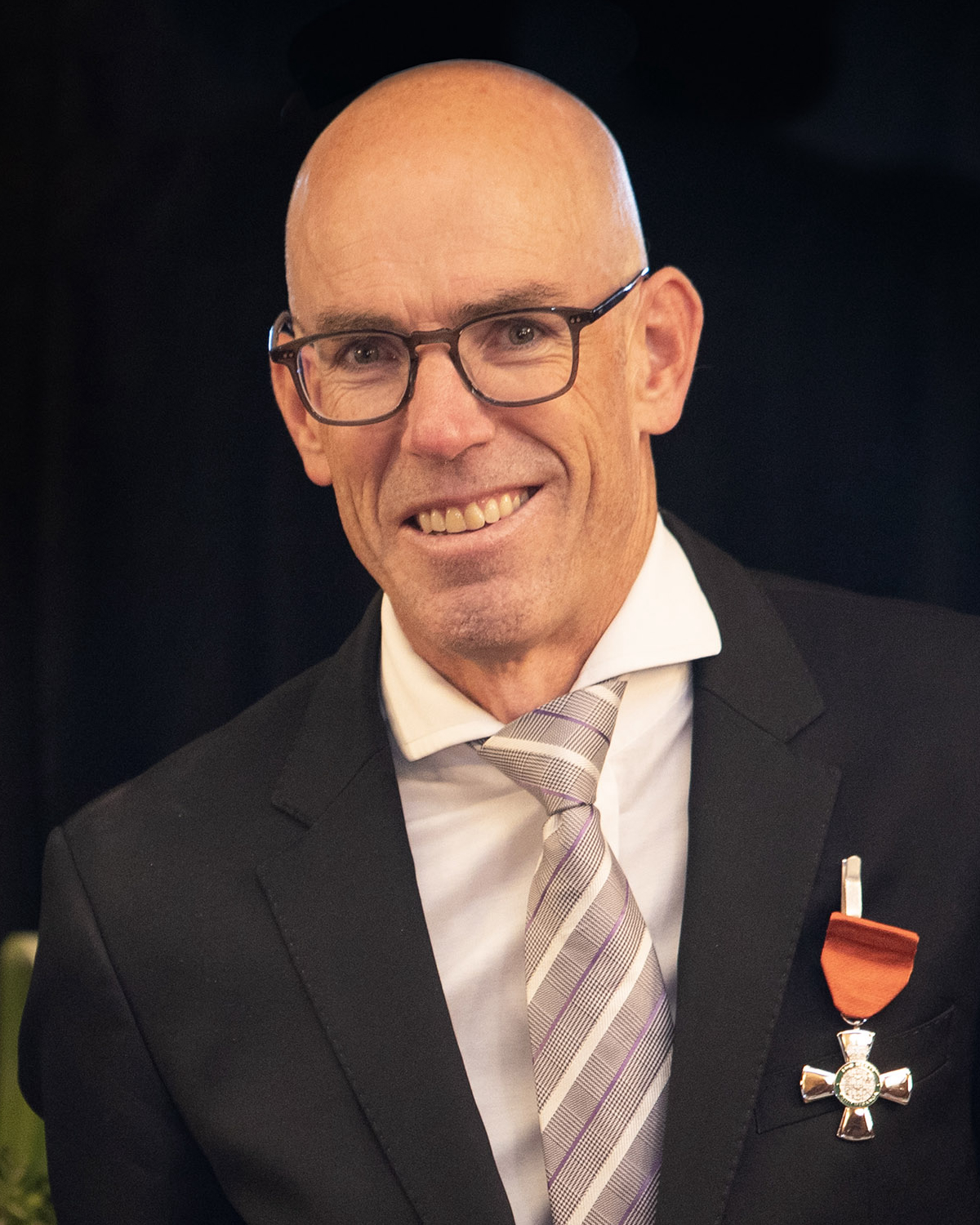
Simon Challies

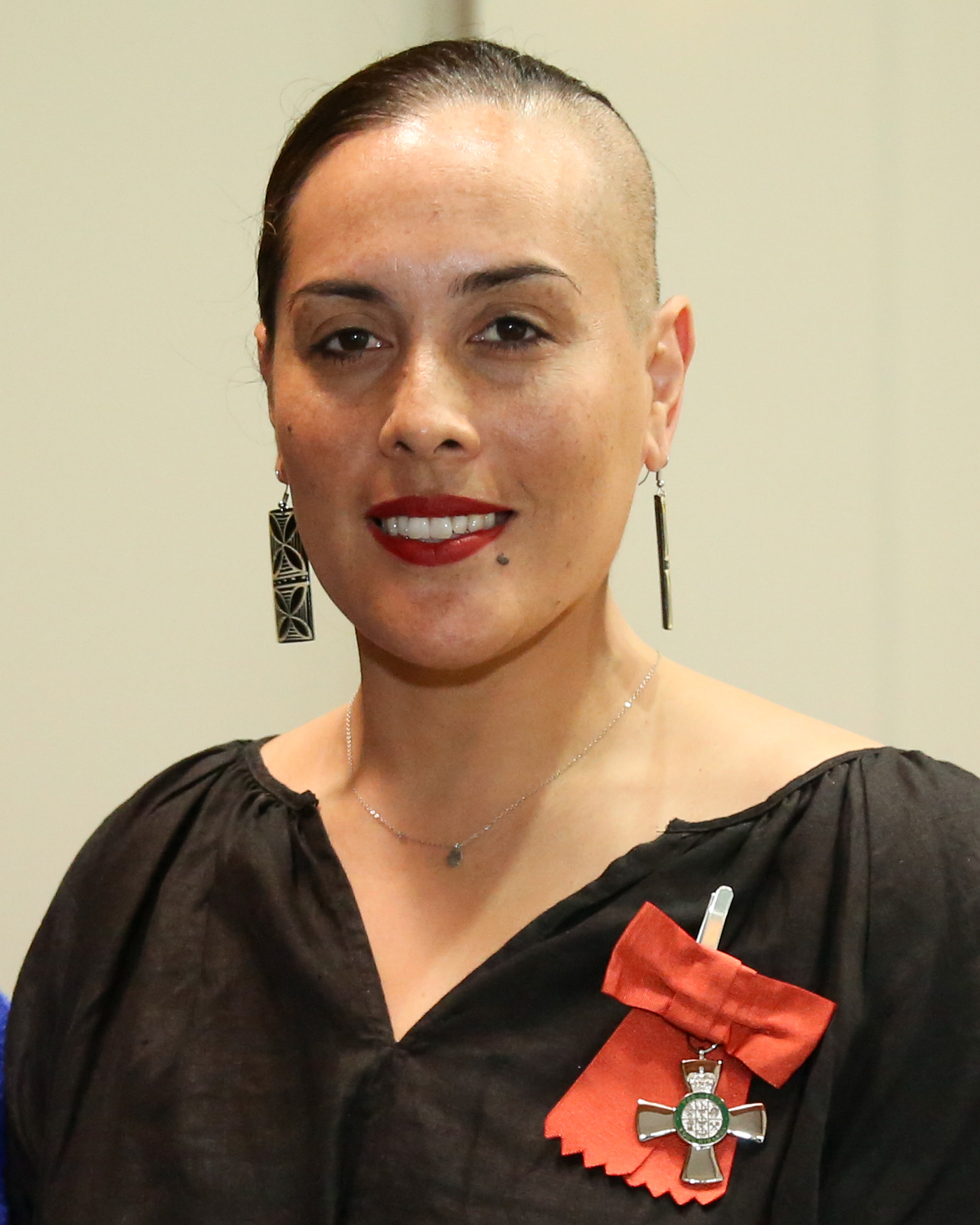
Kendal Collins

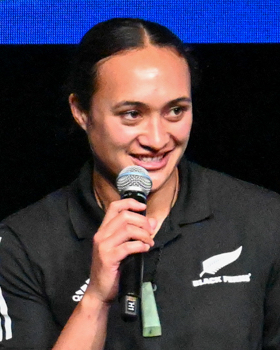
Ruahei Demant

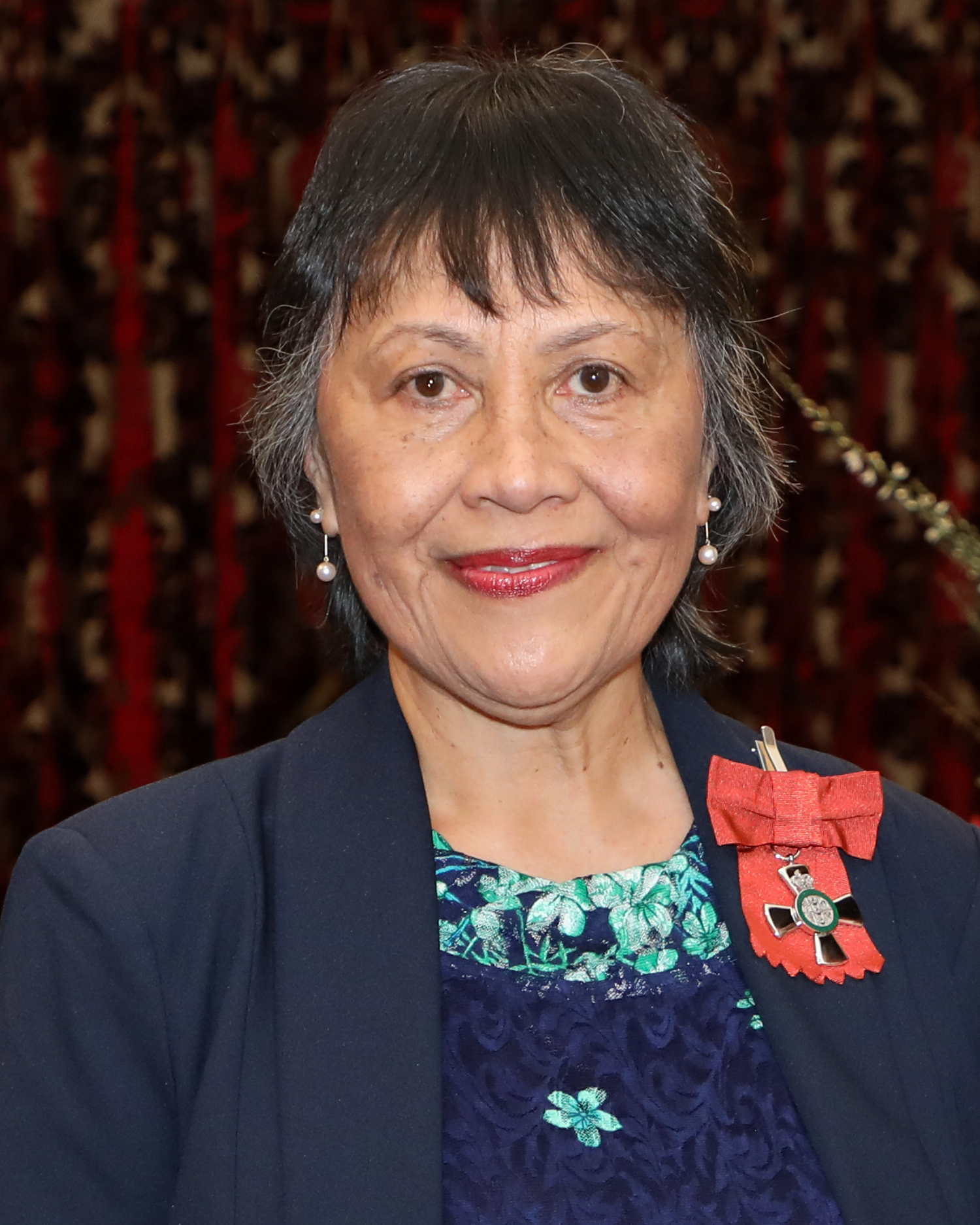
Ofa Dewes

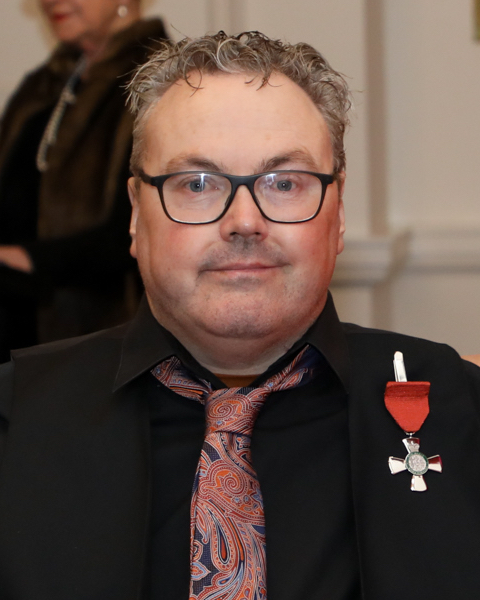
Bryce Dinneen

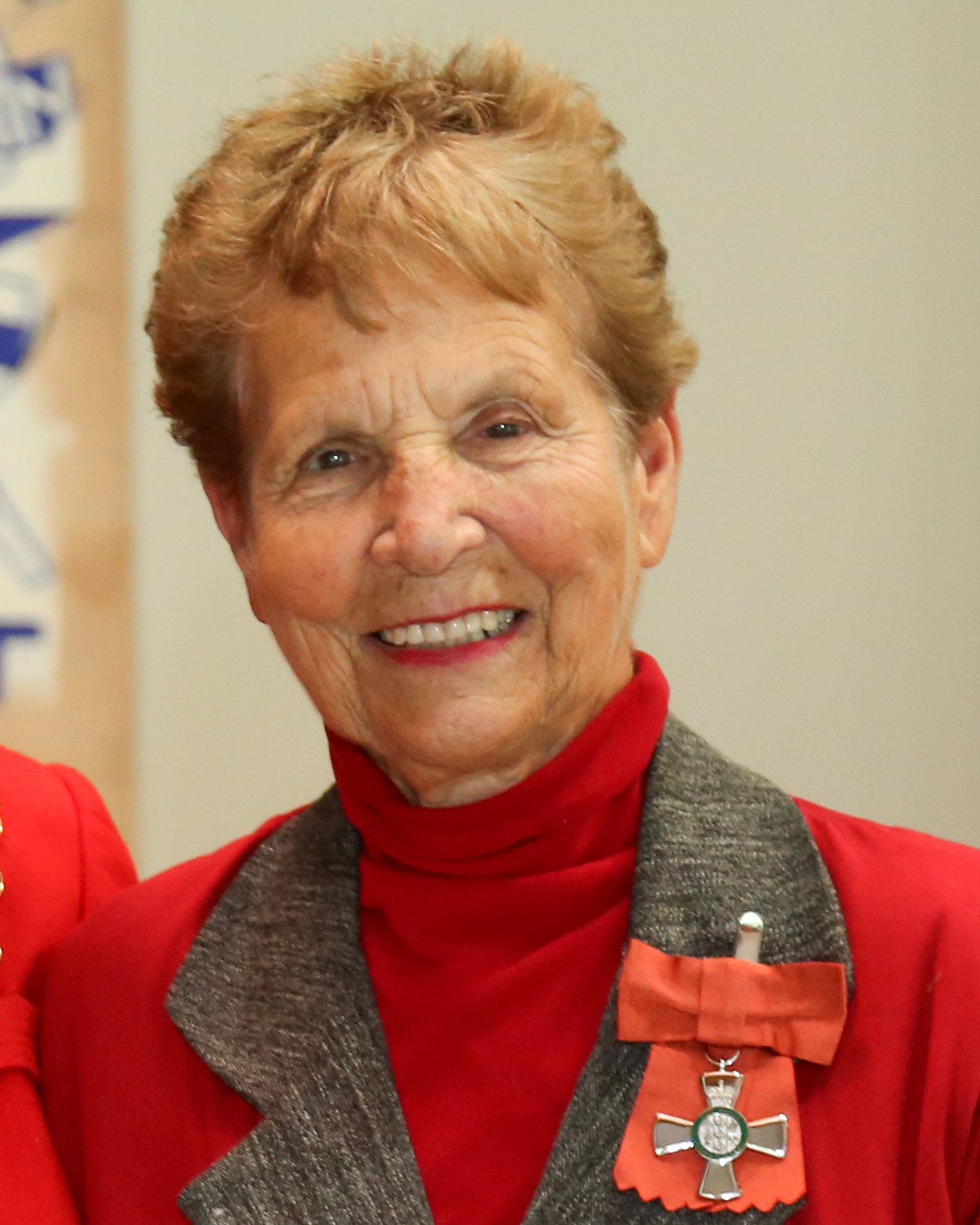
Ann Dunphy

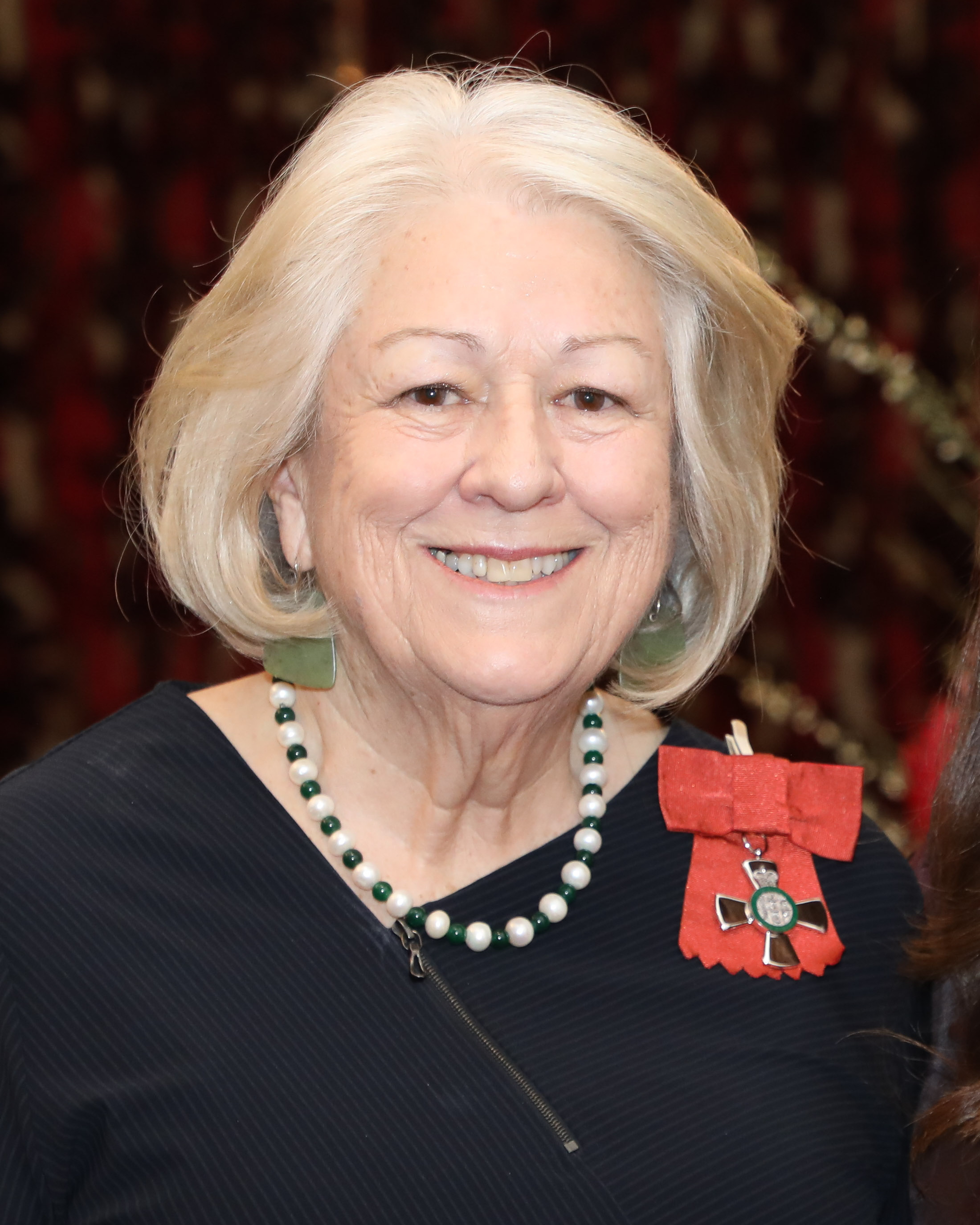
Joy Dunsheath

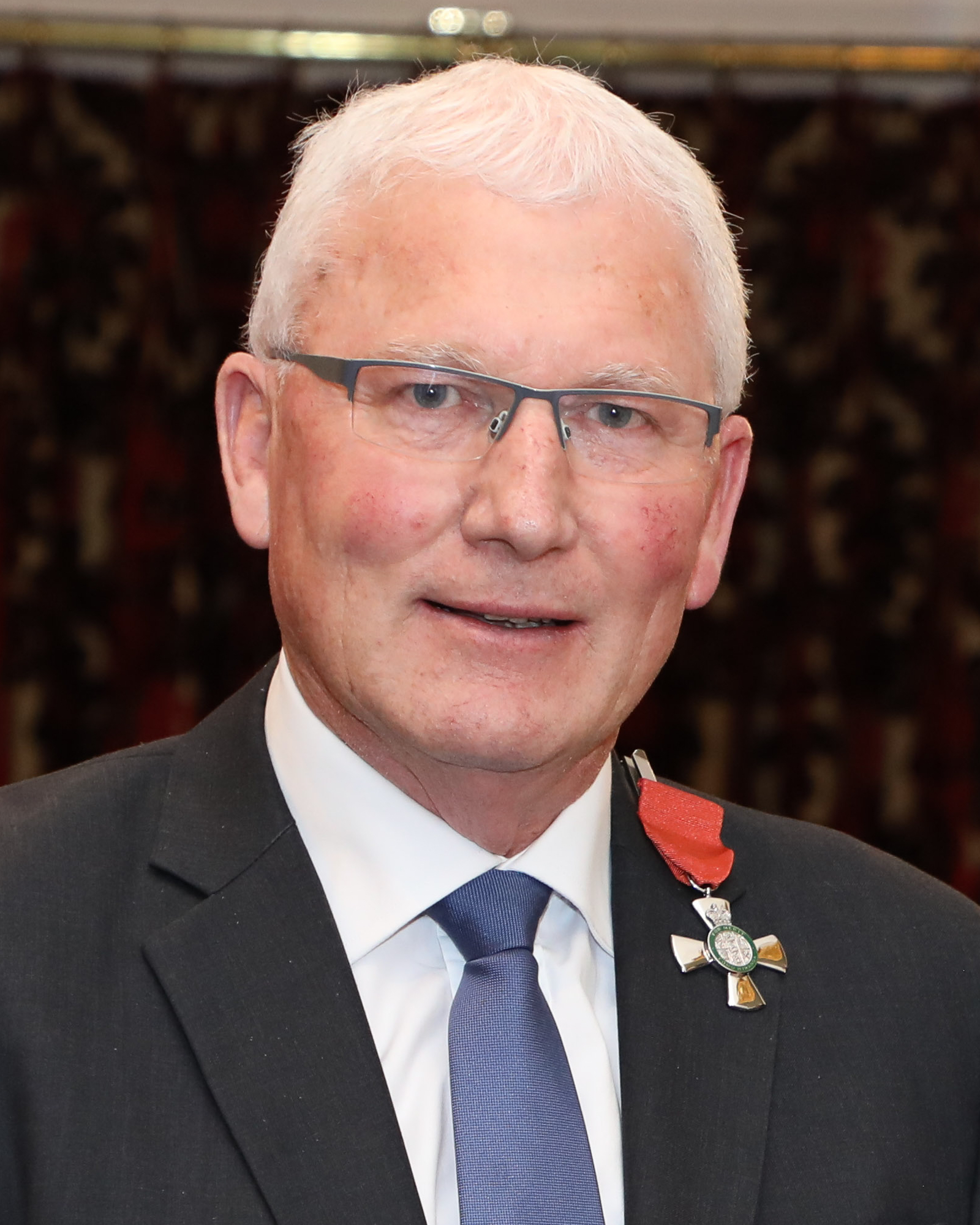
Gerald Dwyer

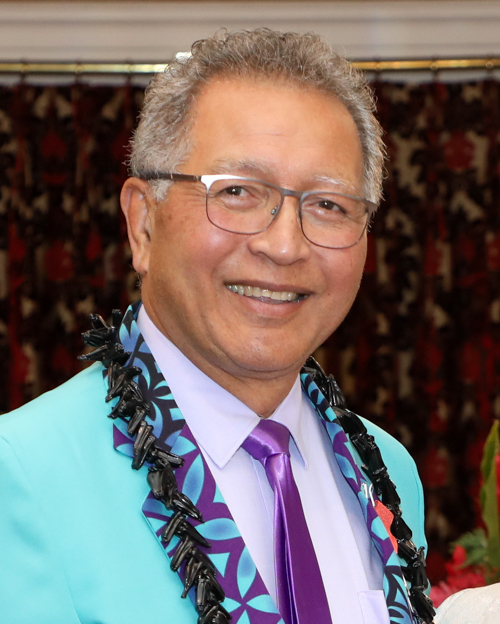
Iosua Esera

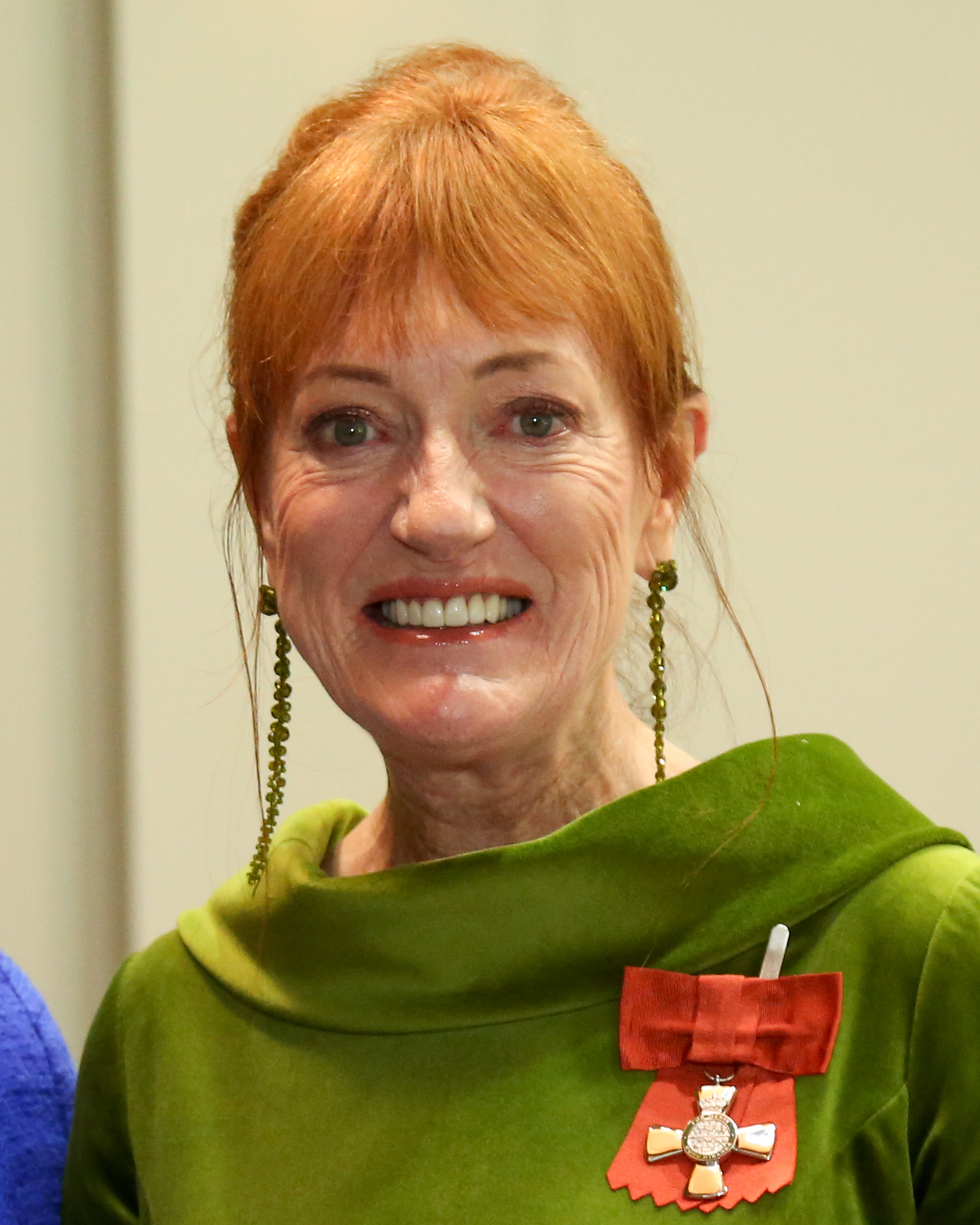
Maggie Eyre

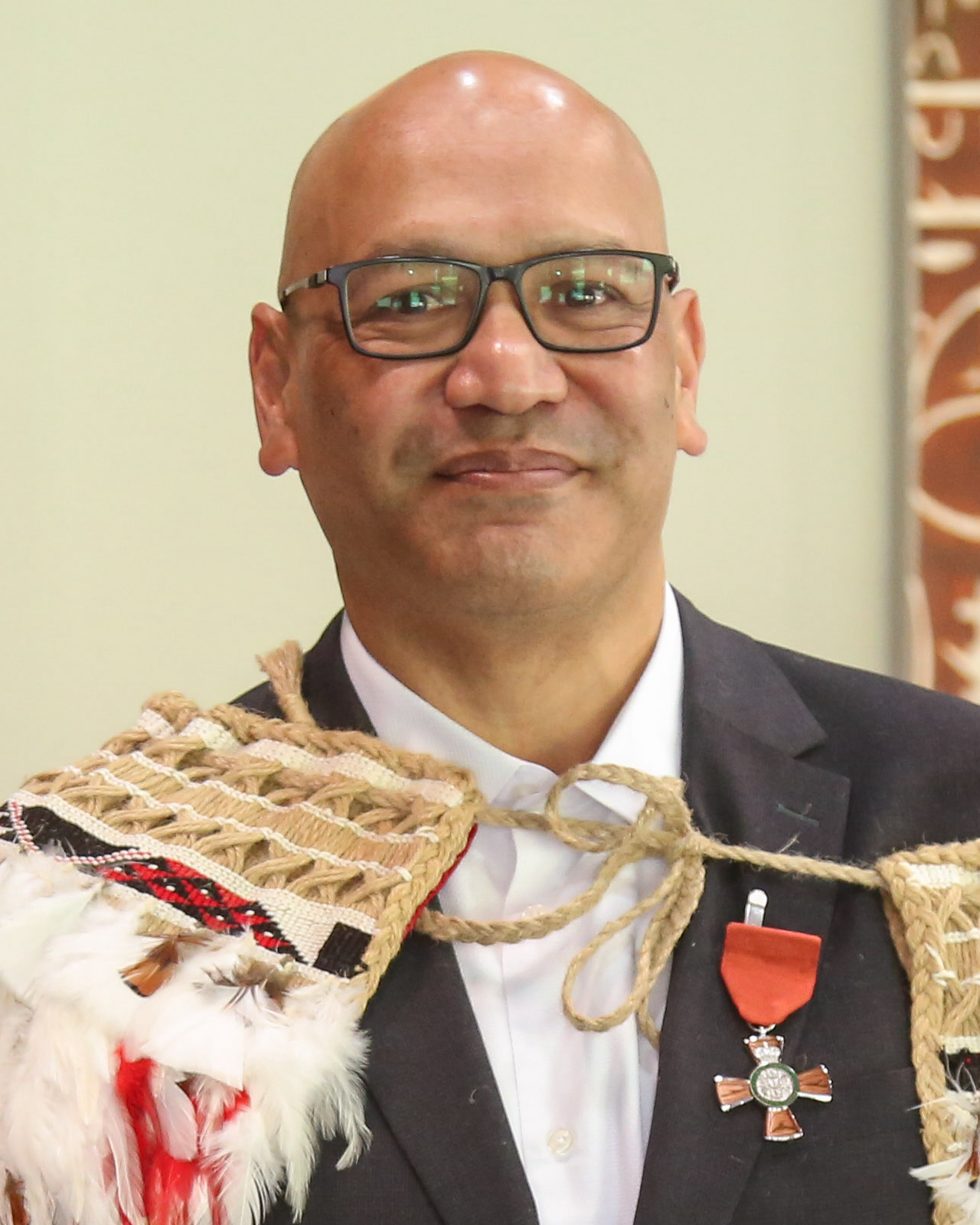
Toa Faneva

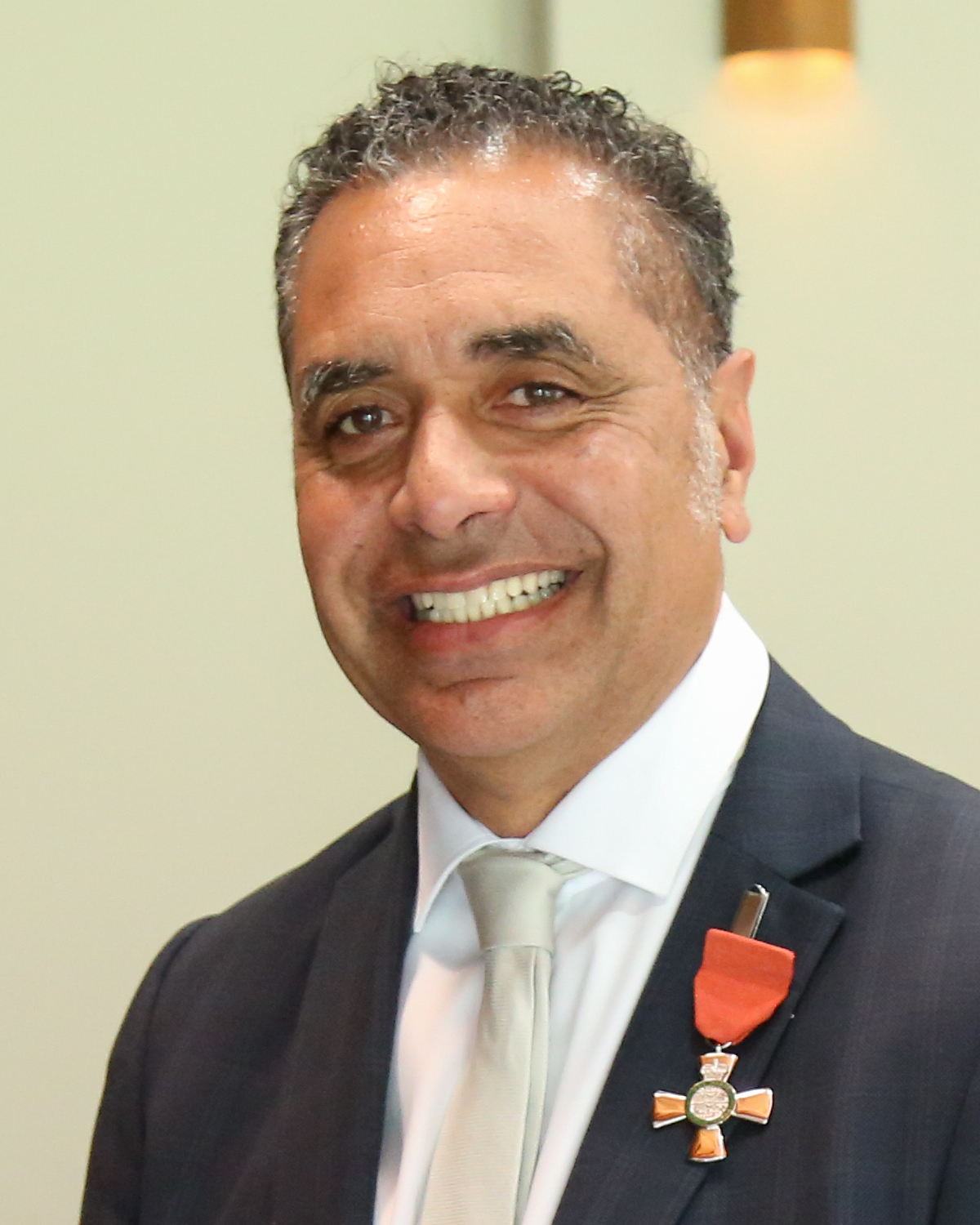
Siale Foliaki

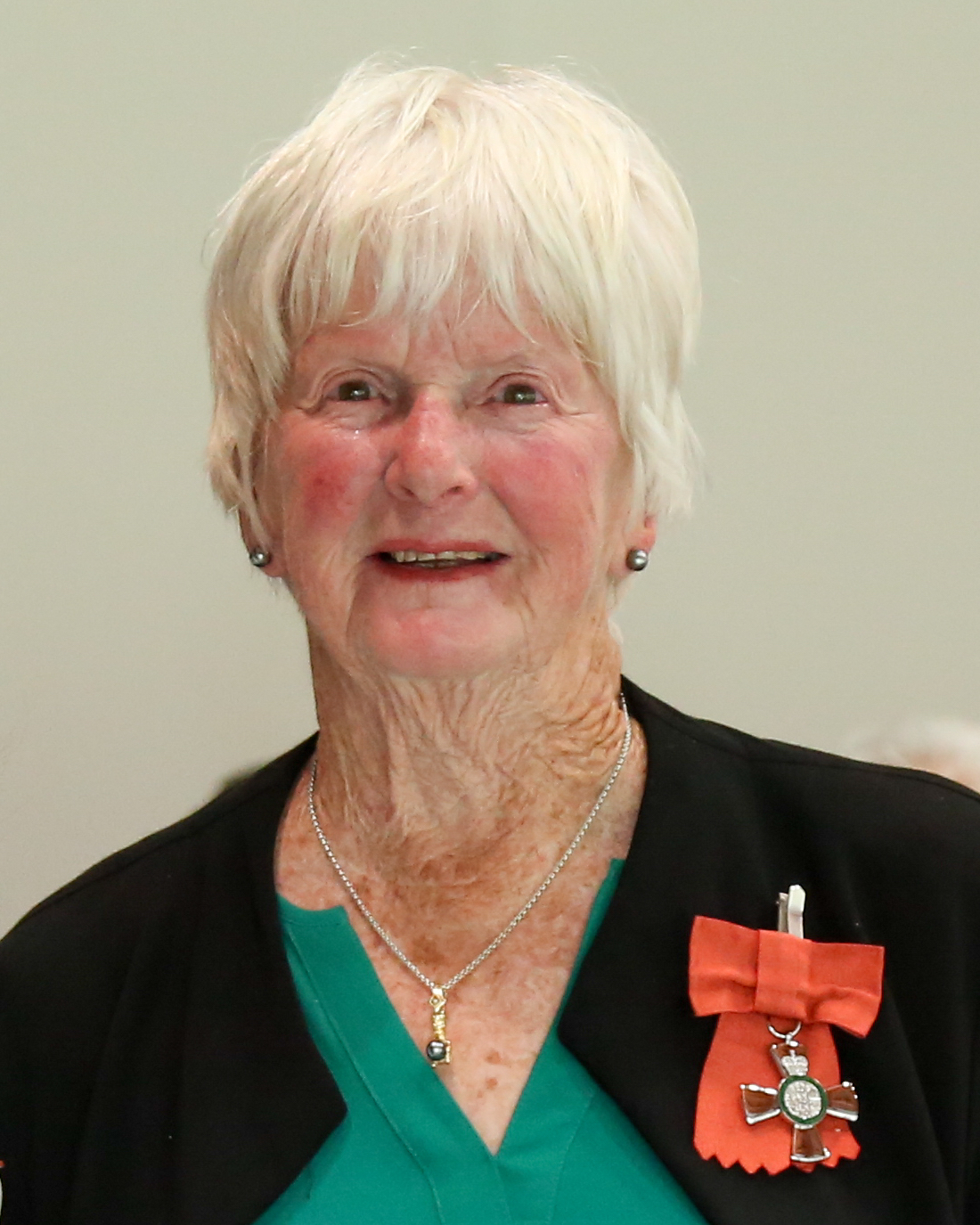
Loloma Foster

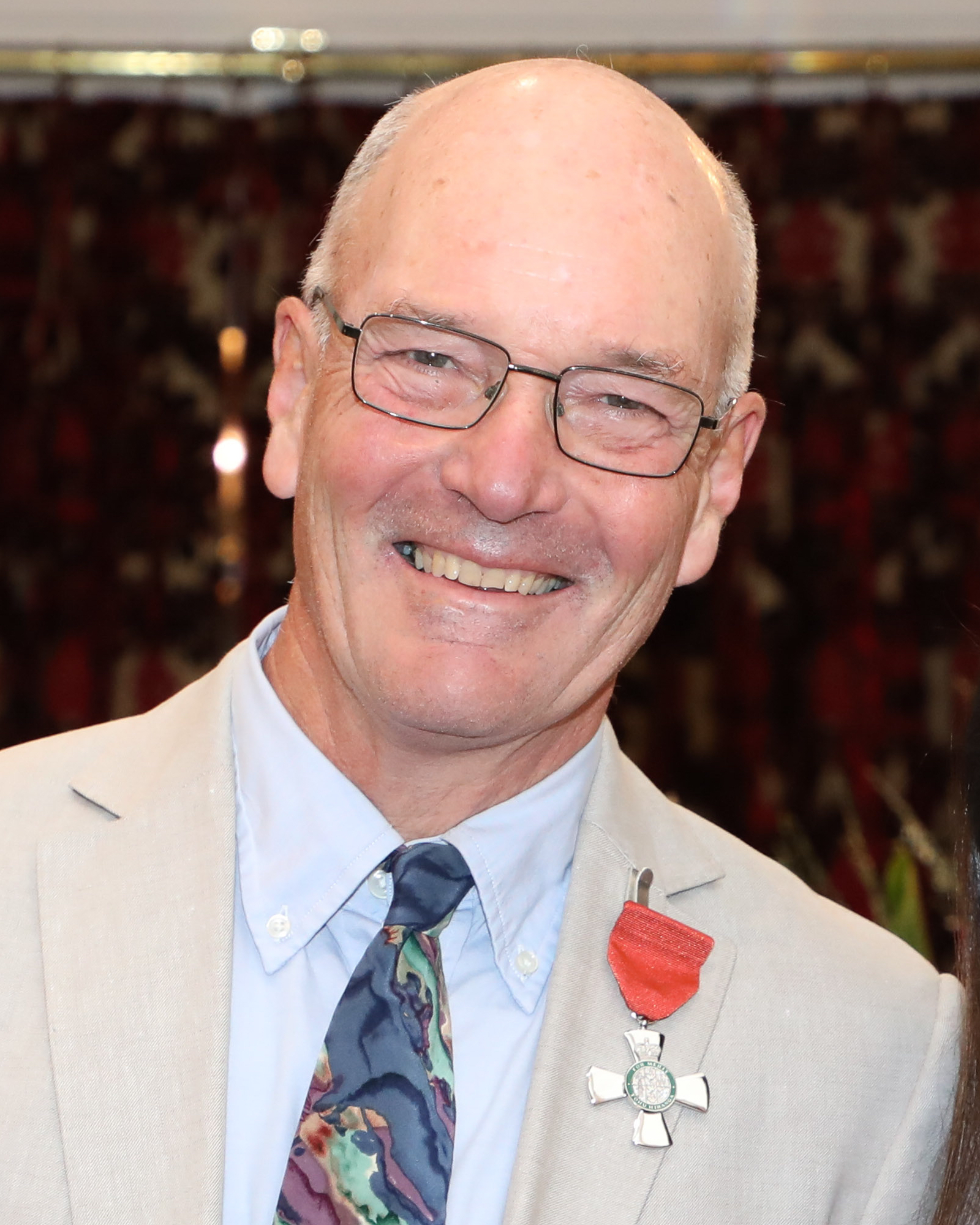
David Haig

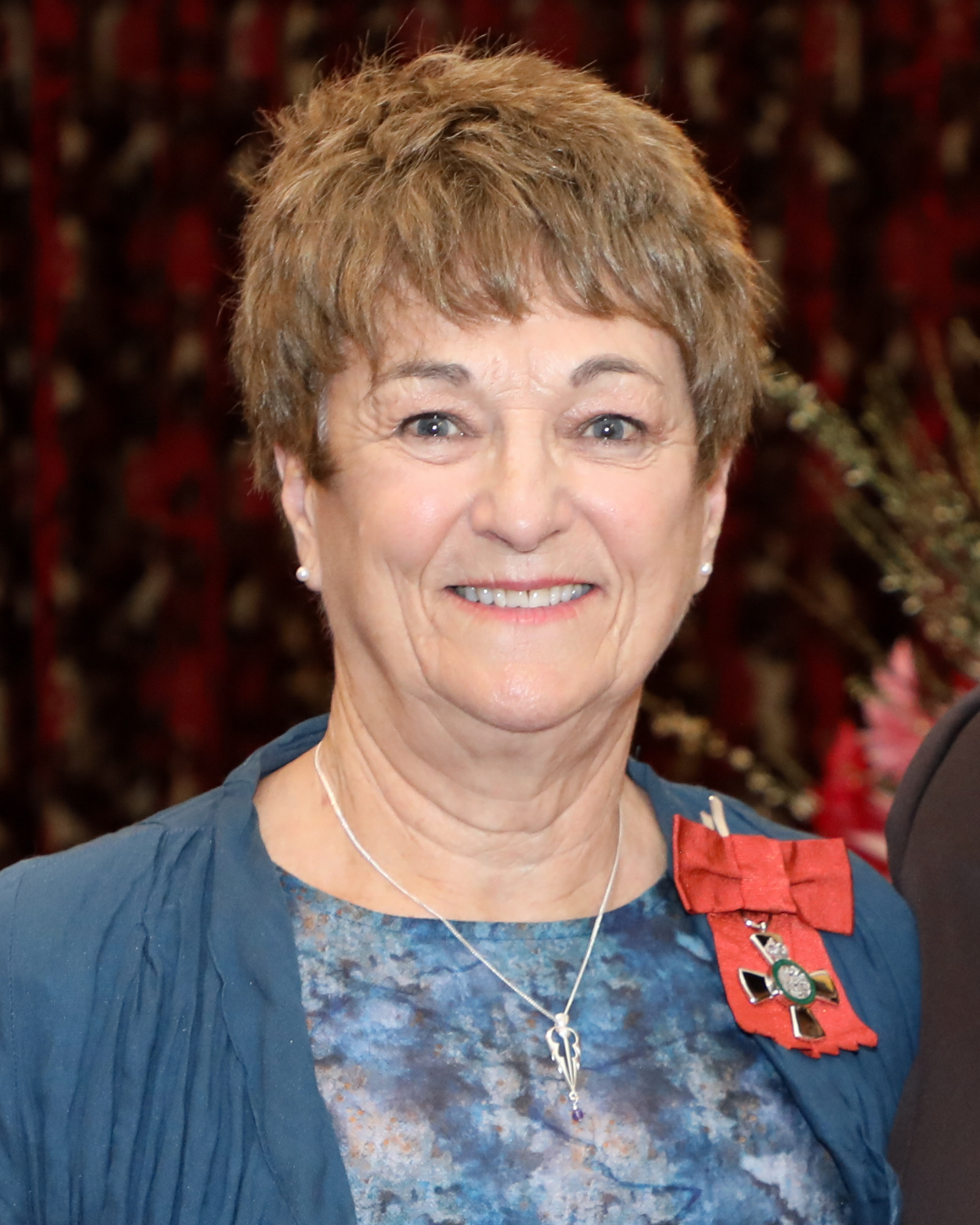
Sherilyn Hall

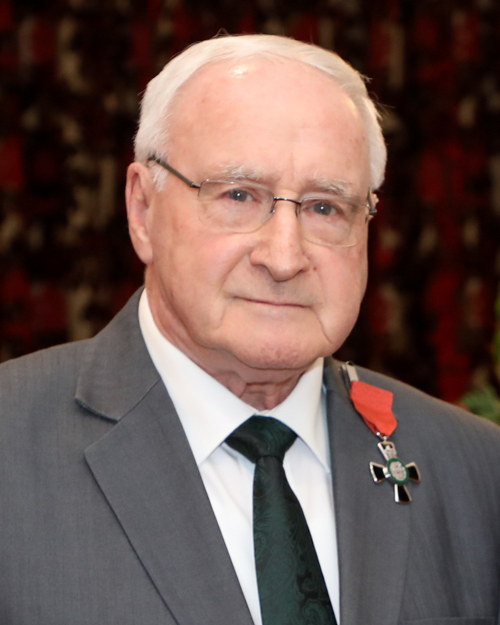
Tony Hanning

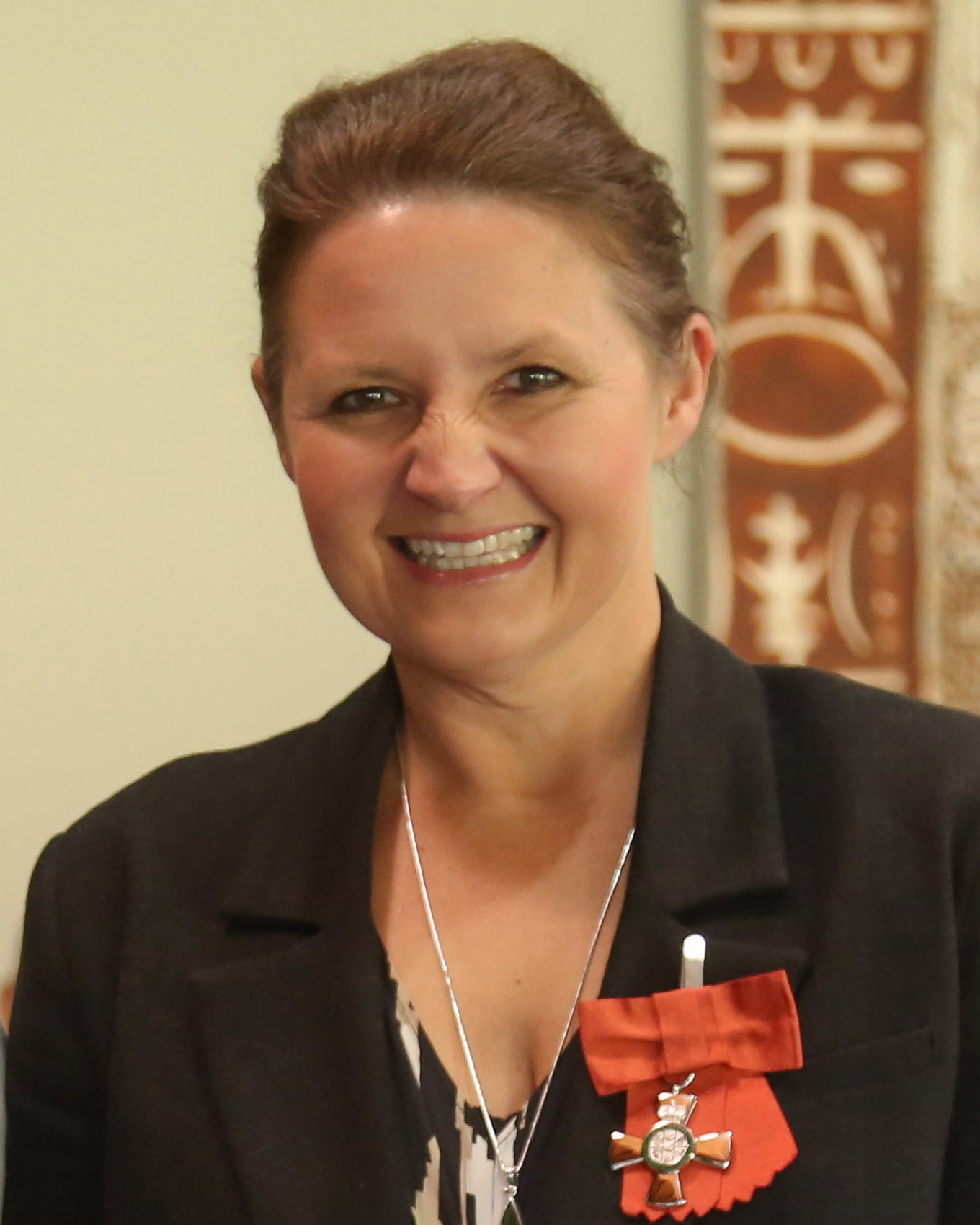
Michelle Hooper

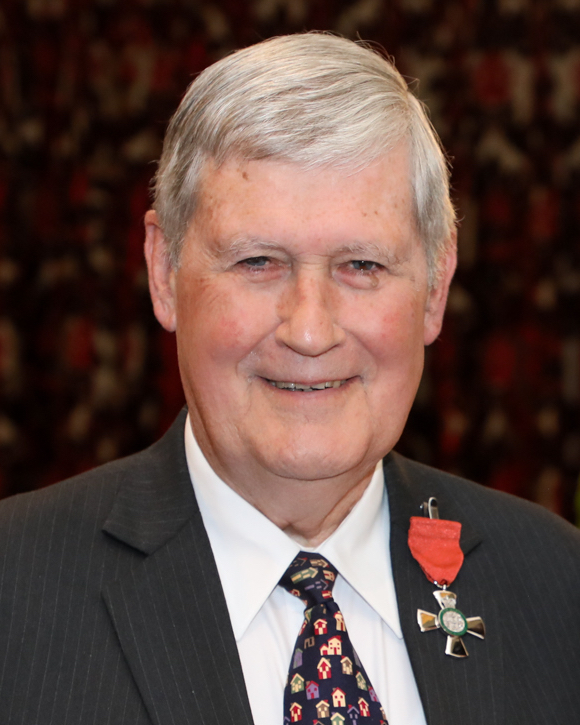
Warren Jack

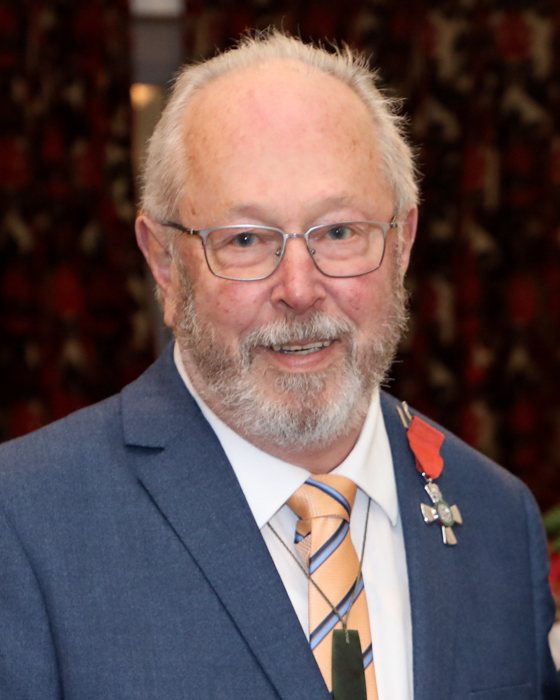
Ian James

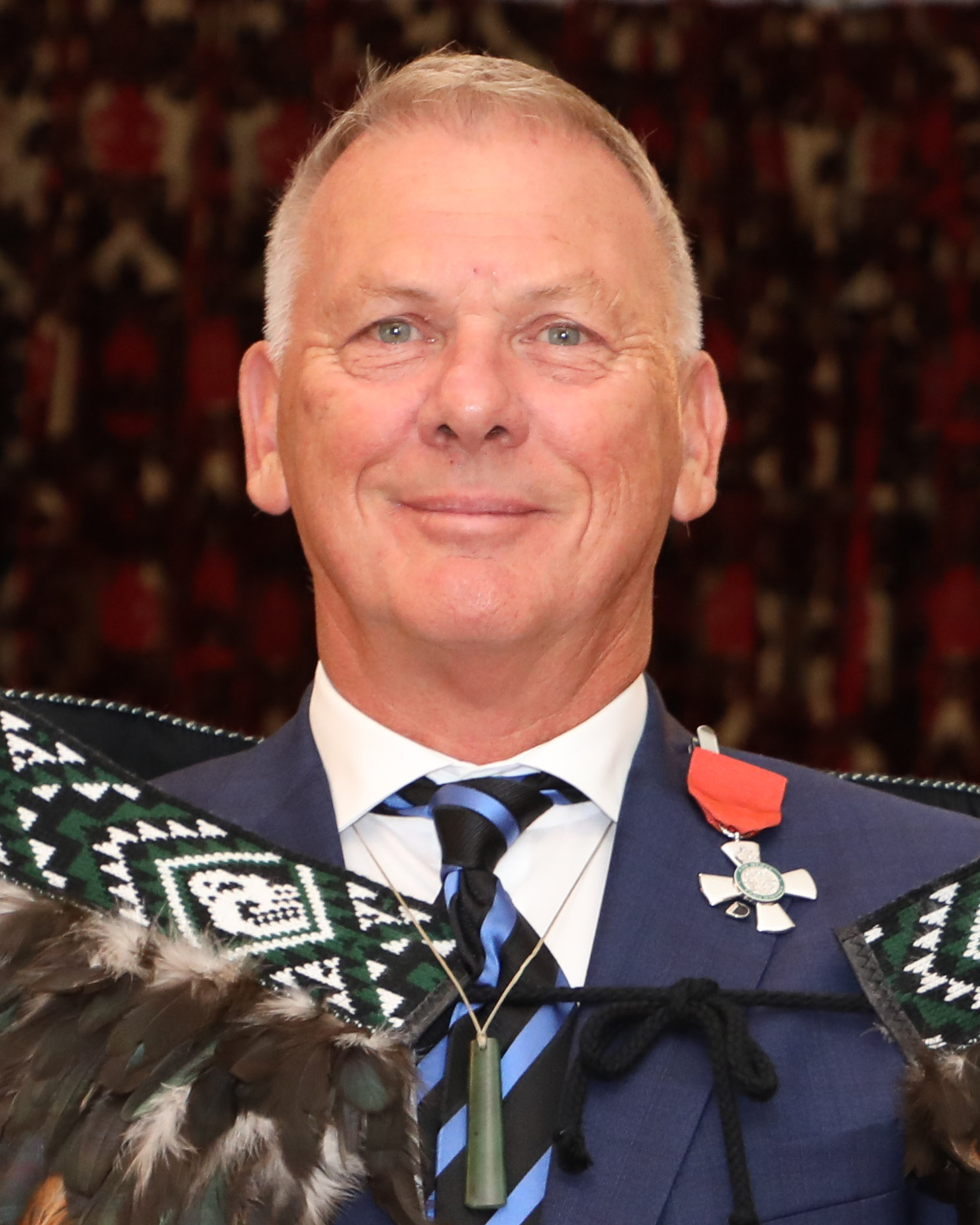
Peter Kaiser

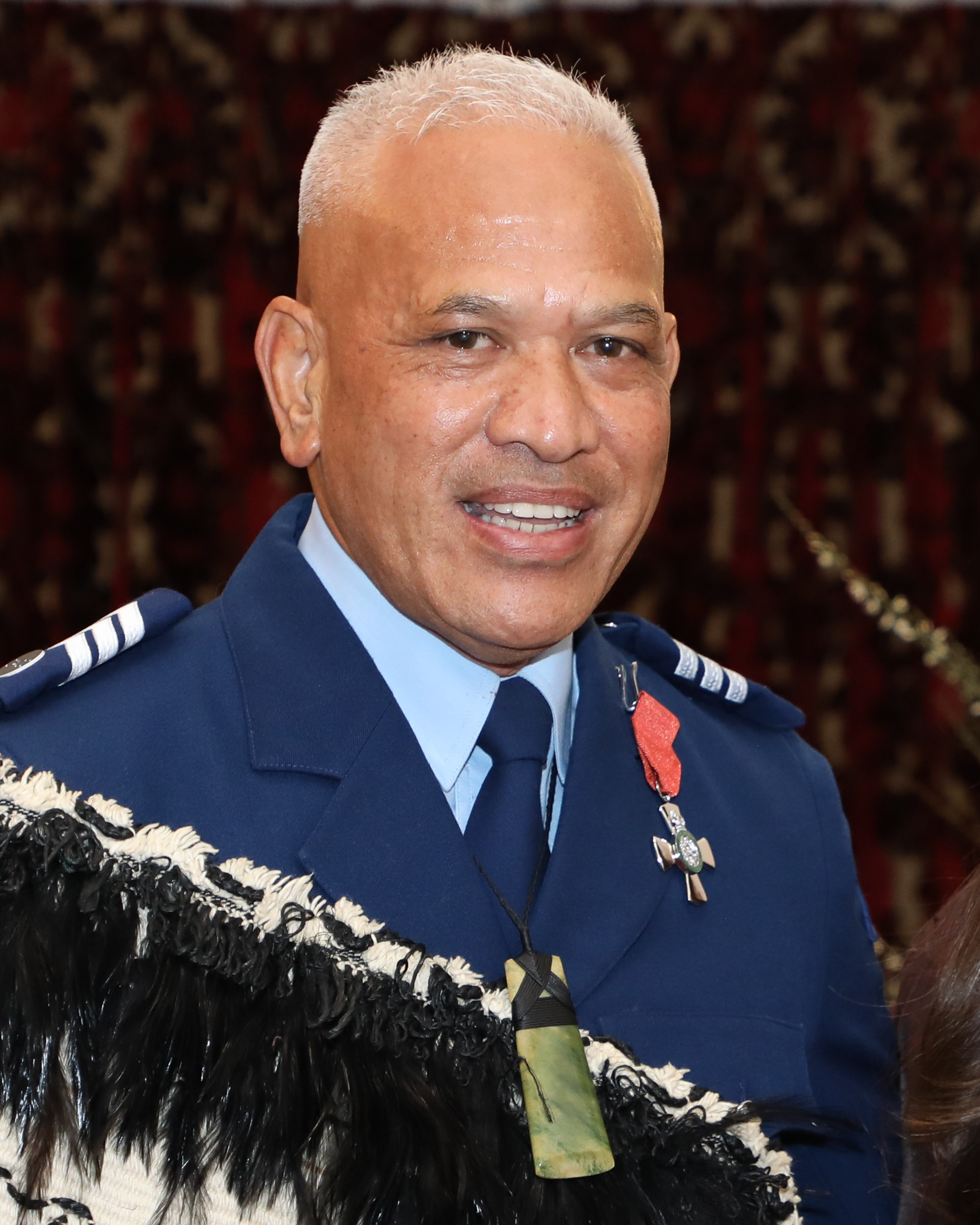
Wally Kopae

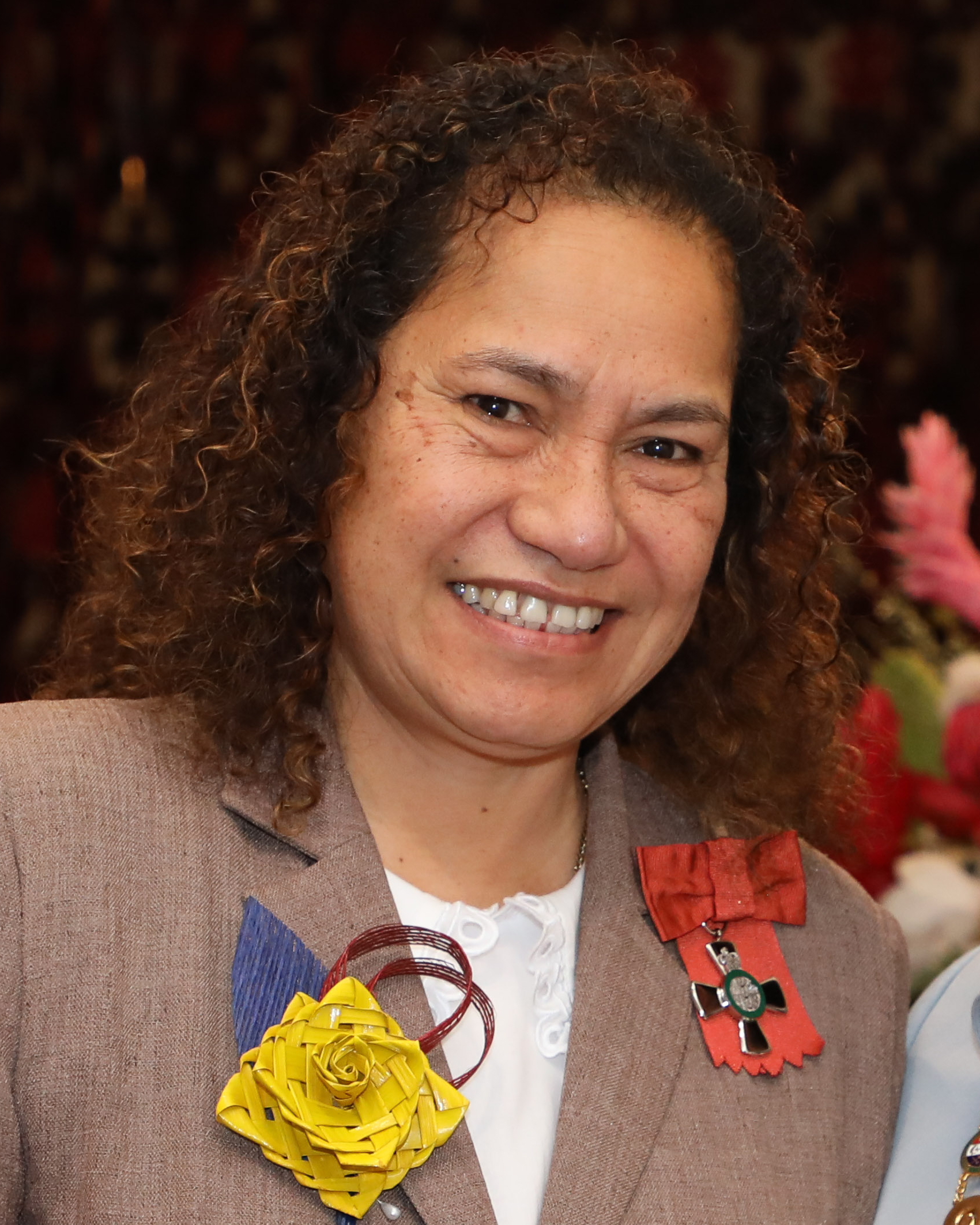
Alexis LewGor

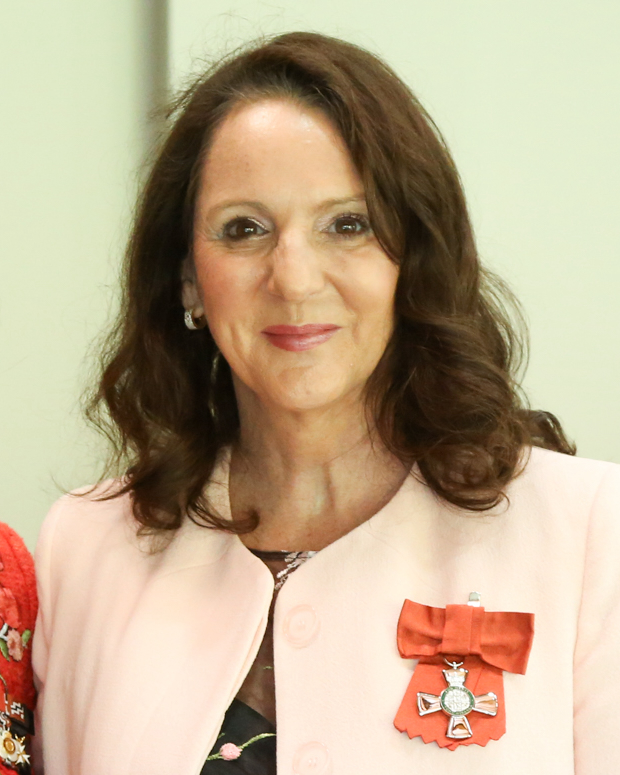
Charlotte Lockhart

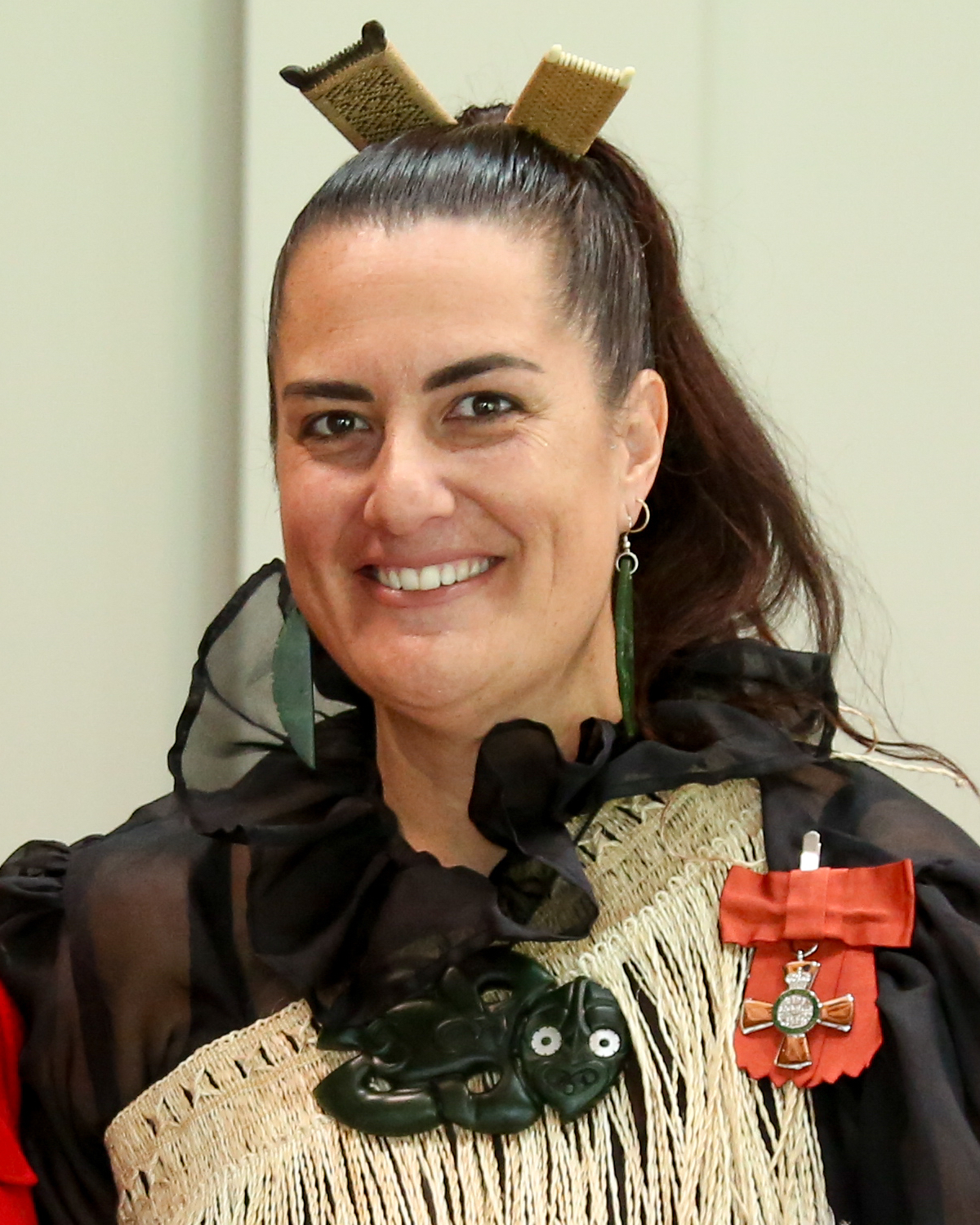
Qiane Matata-Sipu

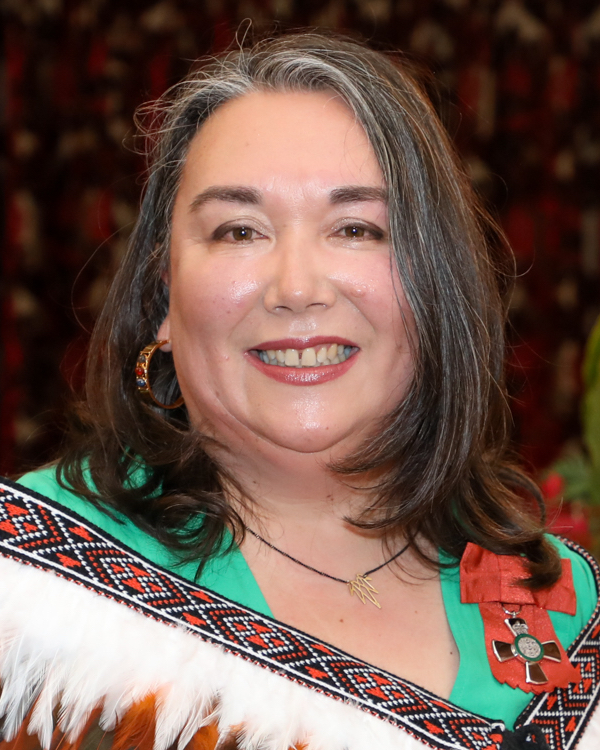
Stacey Mendonca

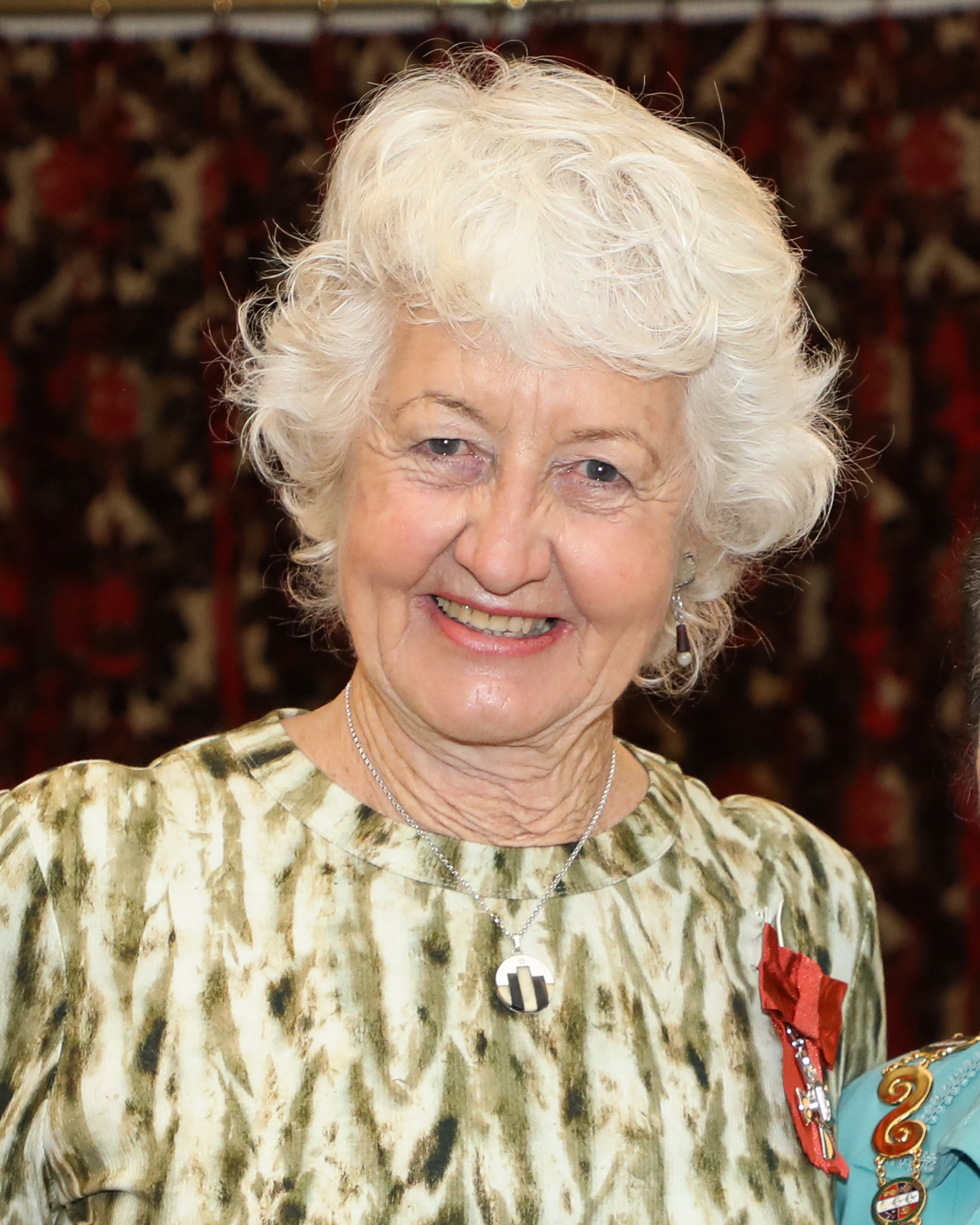
Lyn Milne

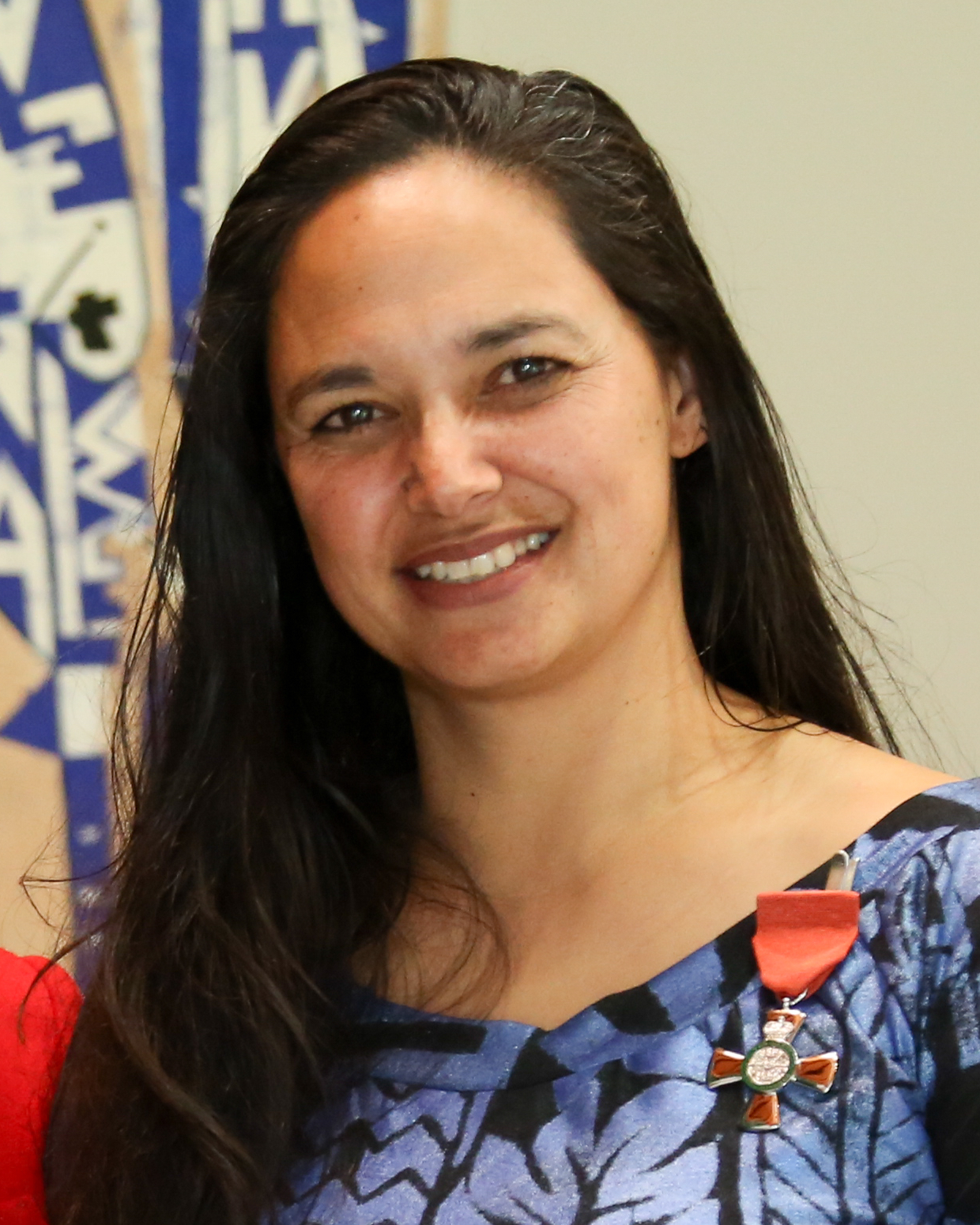
Tara Moala

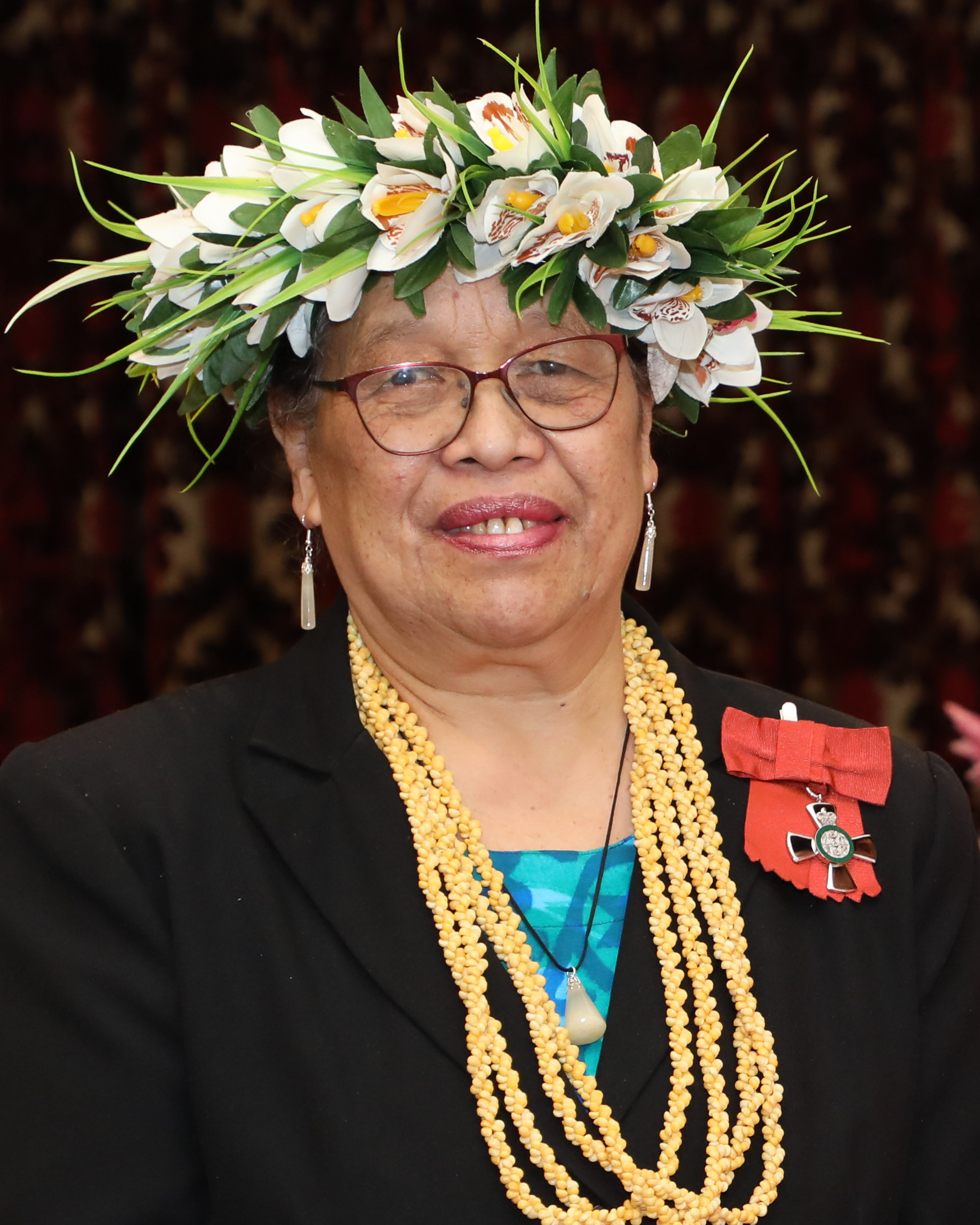
Keni Moeroa

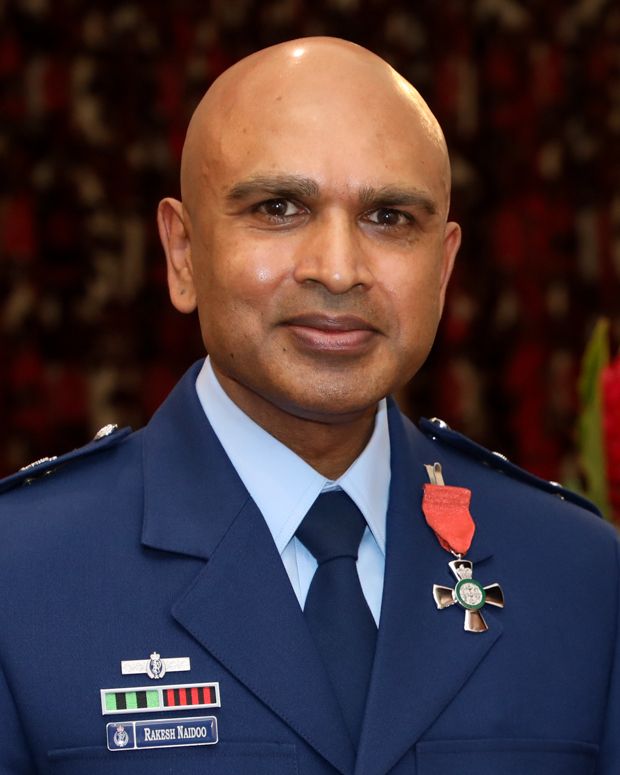
Rakesh Naidoo

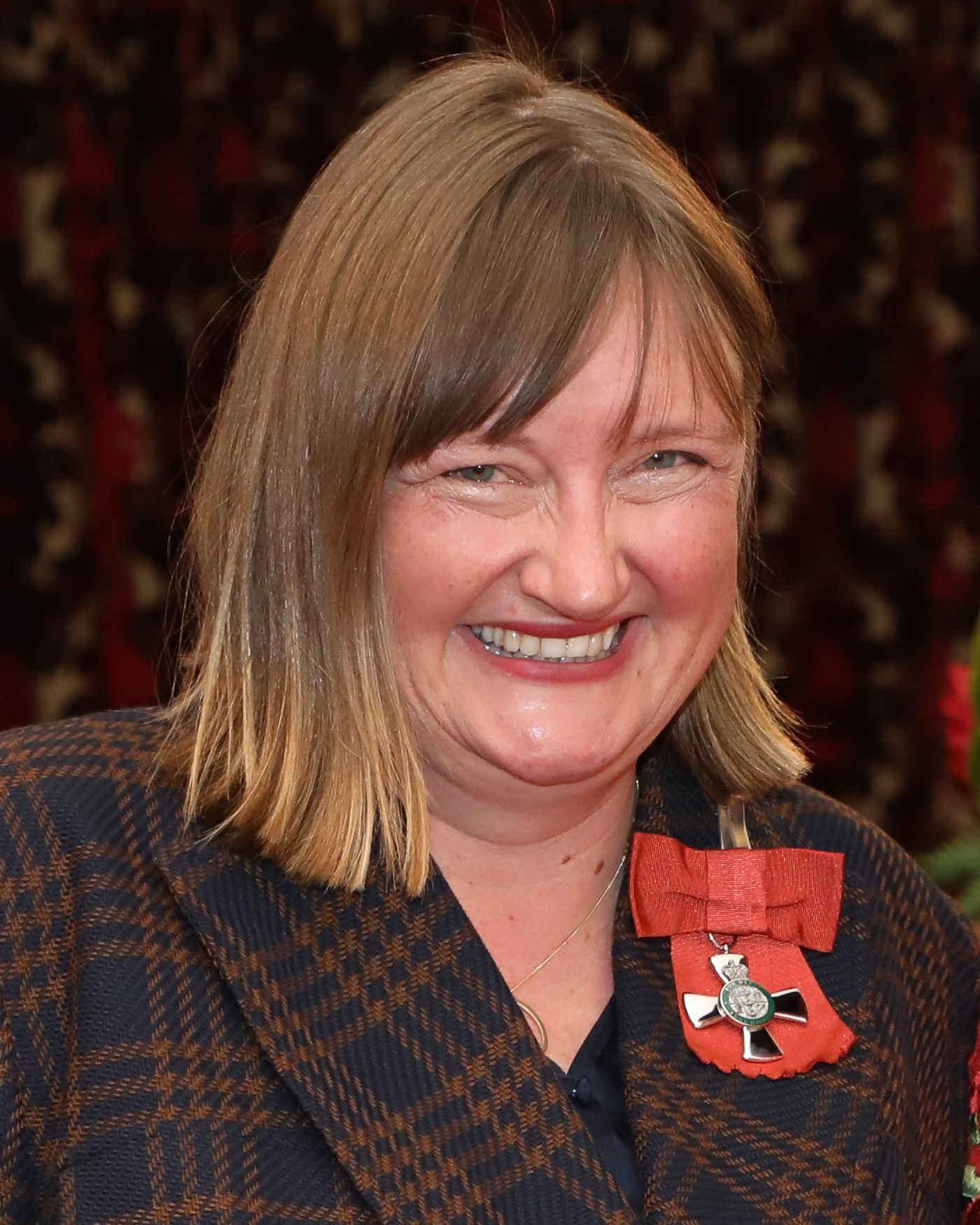
Andrea Nelson

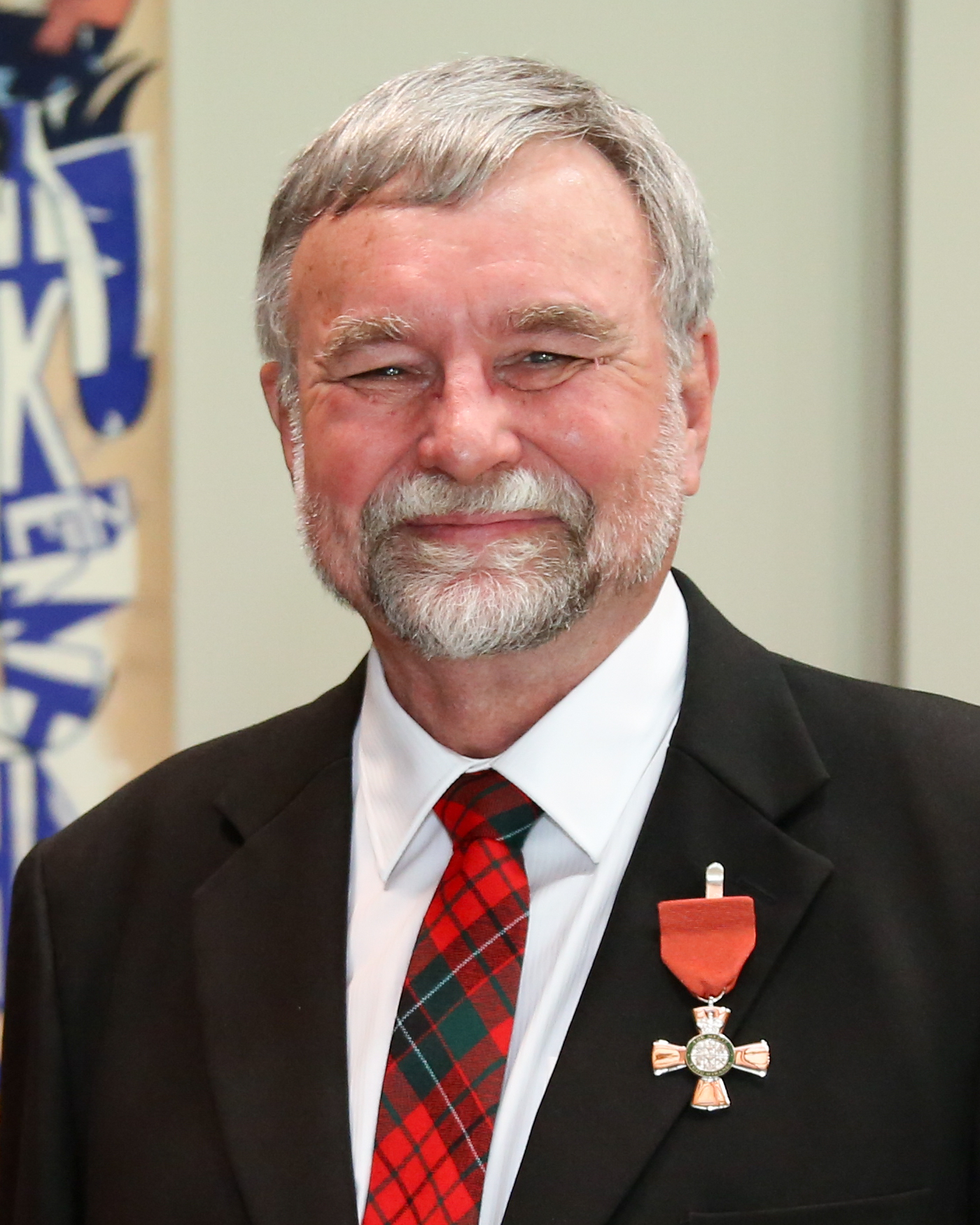
Malcolm Nicolson

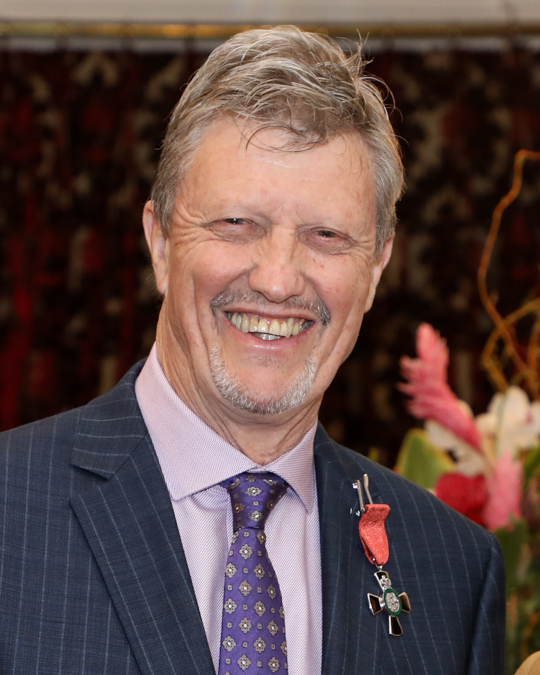
Barry Pickering

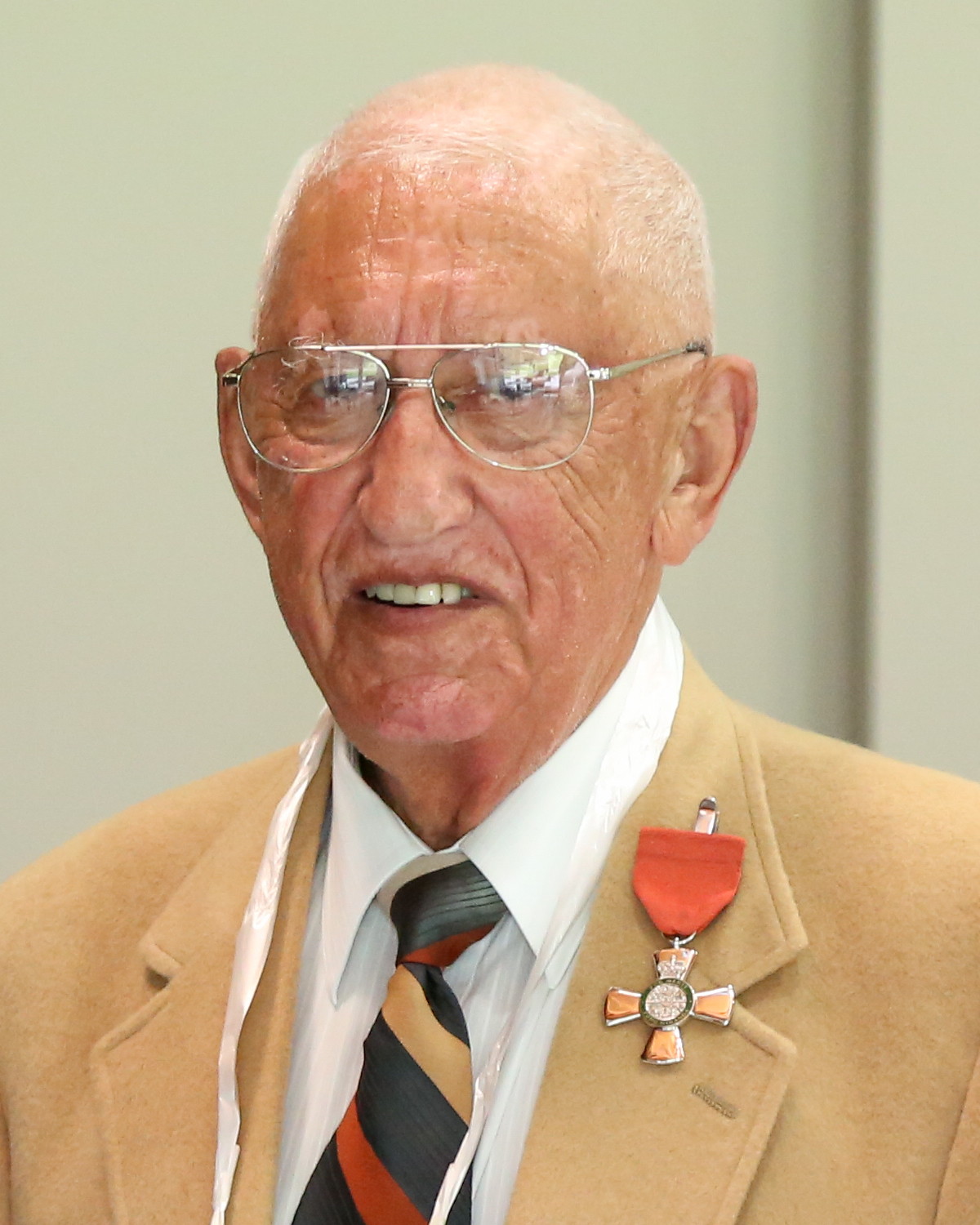
Vic Pirihi

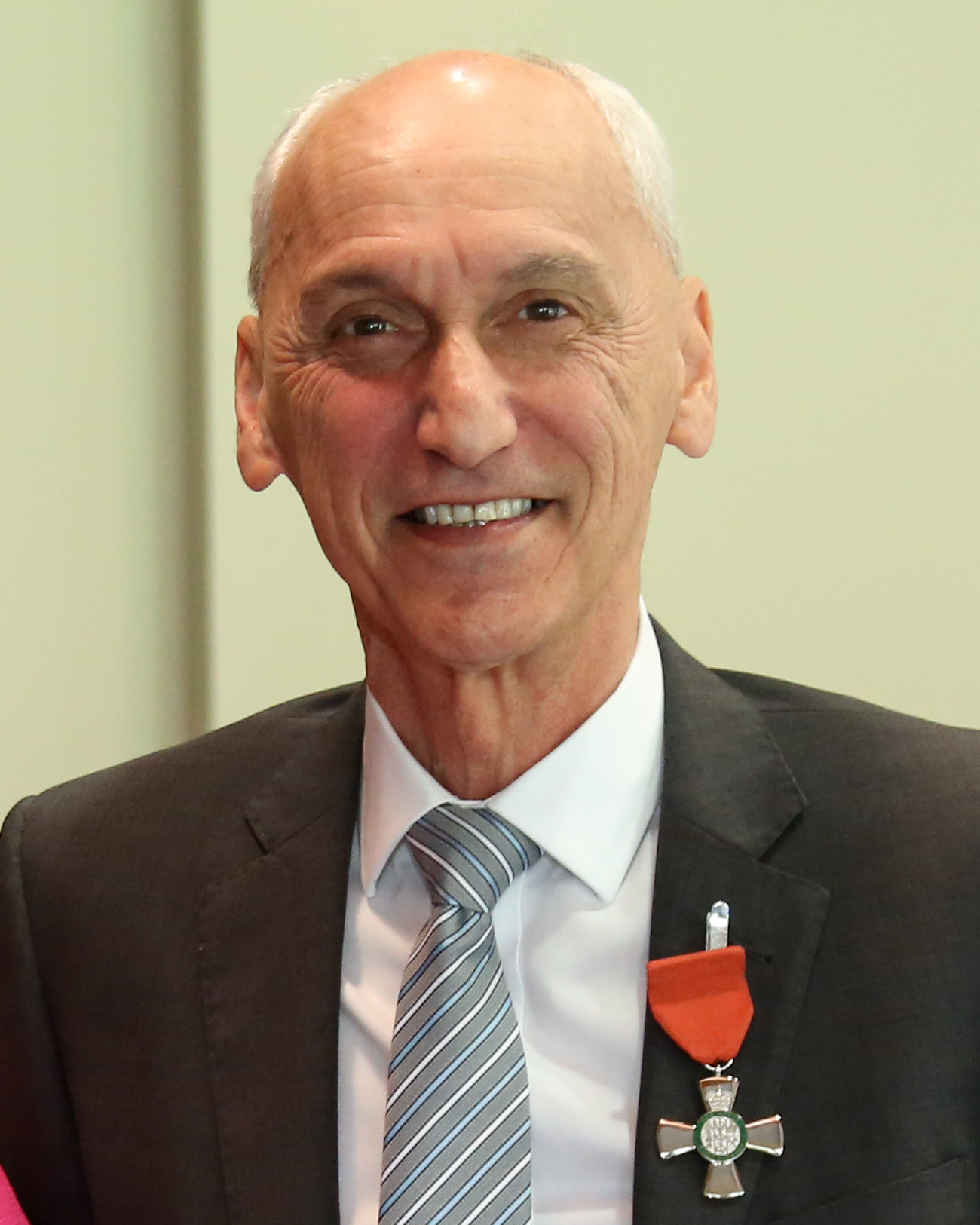
Tom Poata

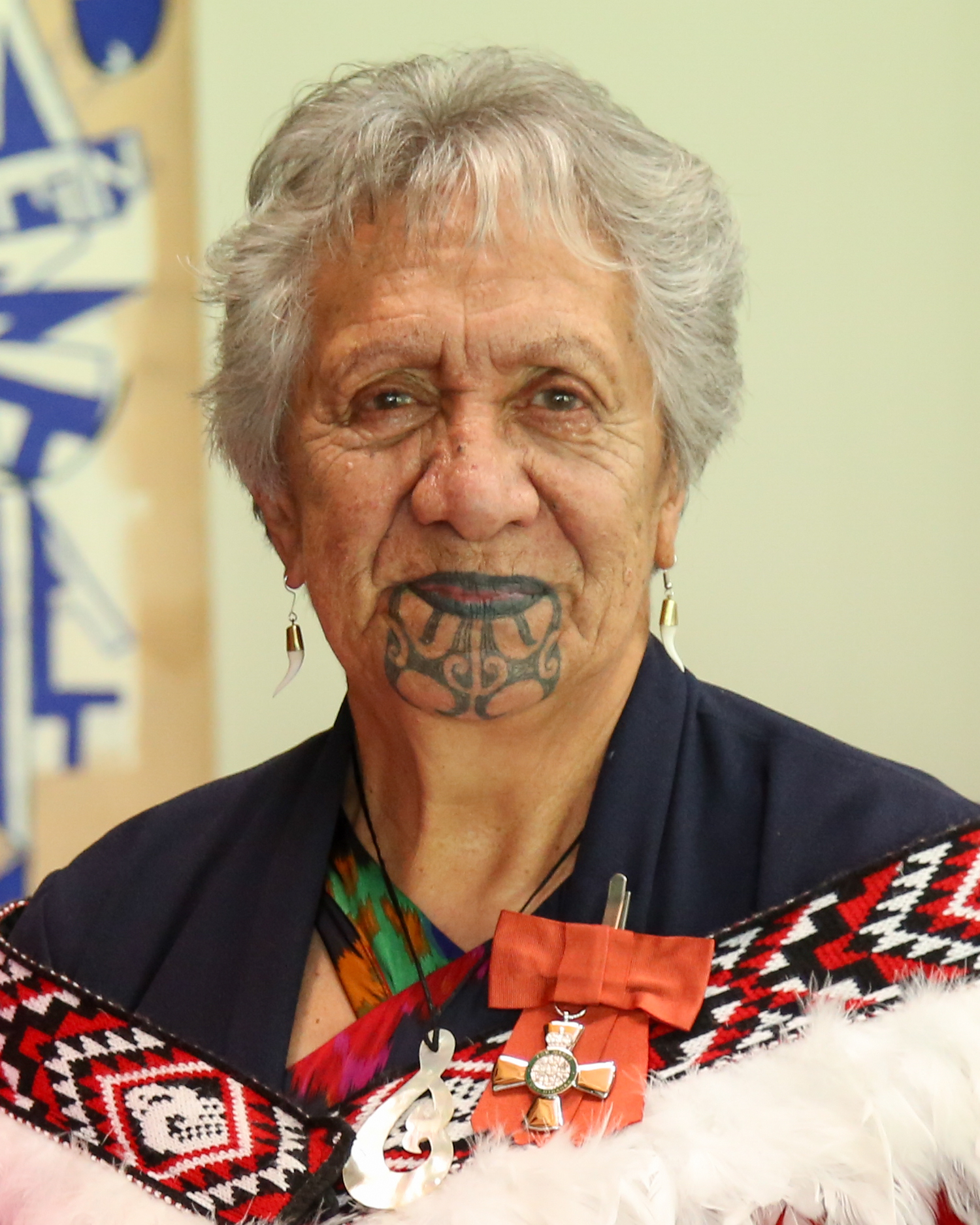
Helen Rawiri

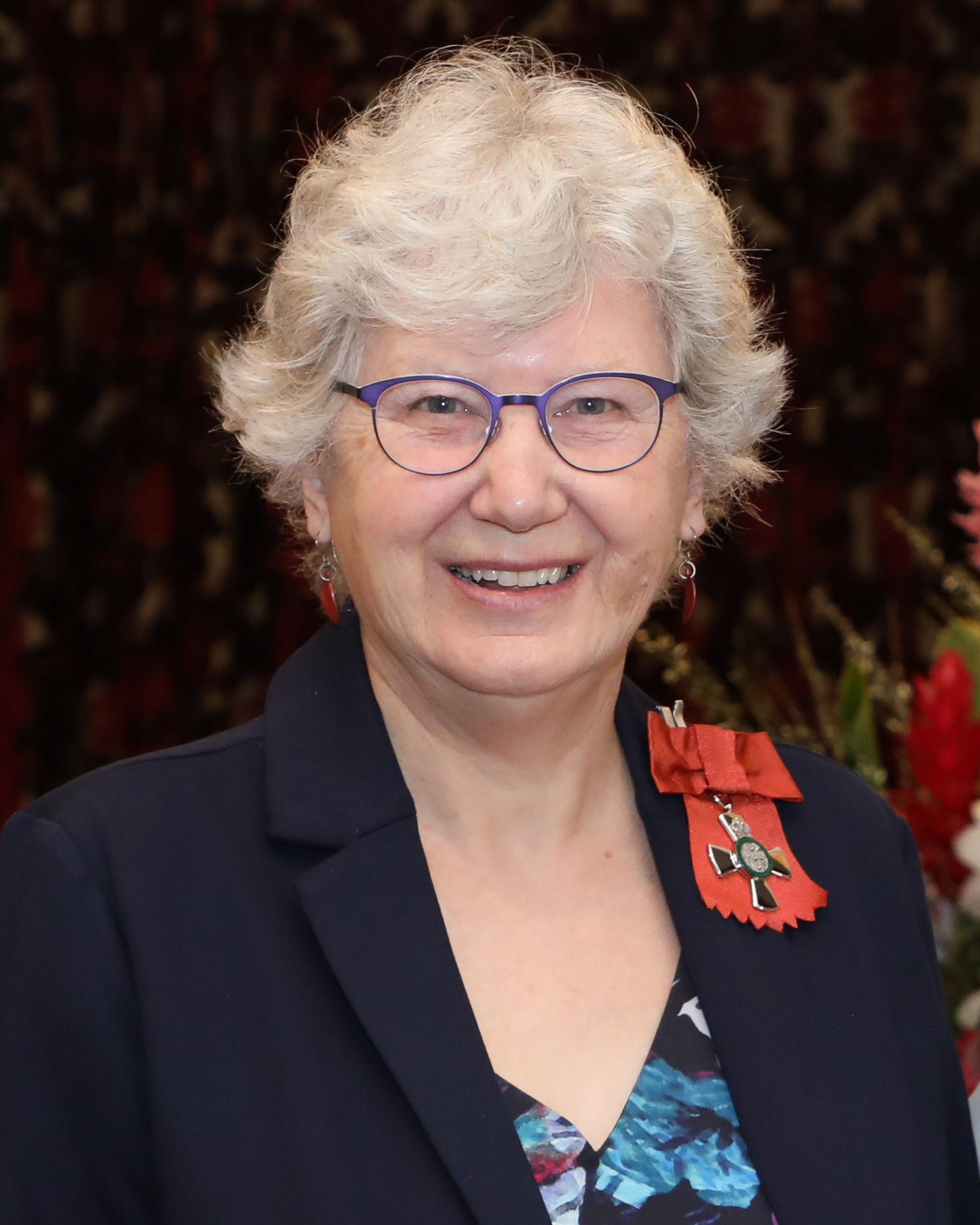
Christine Richardson

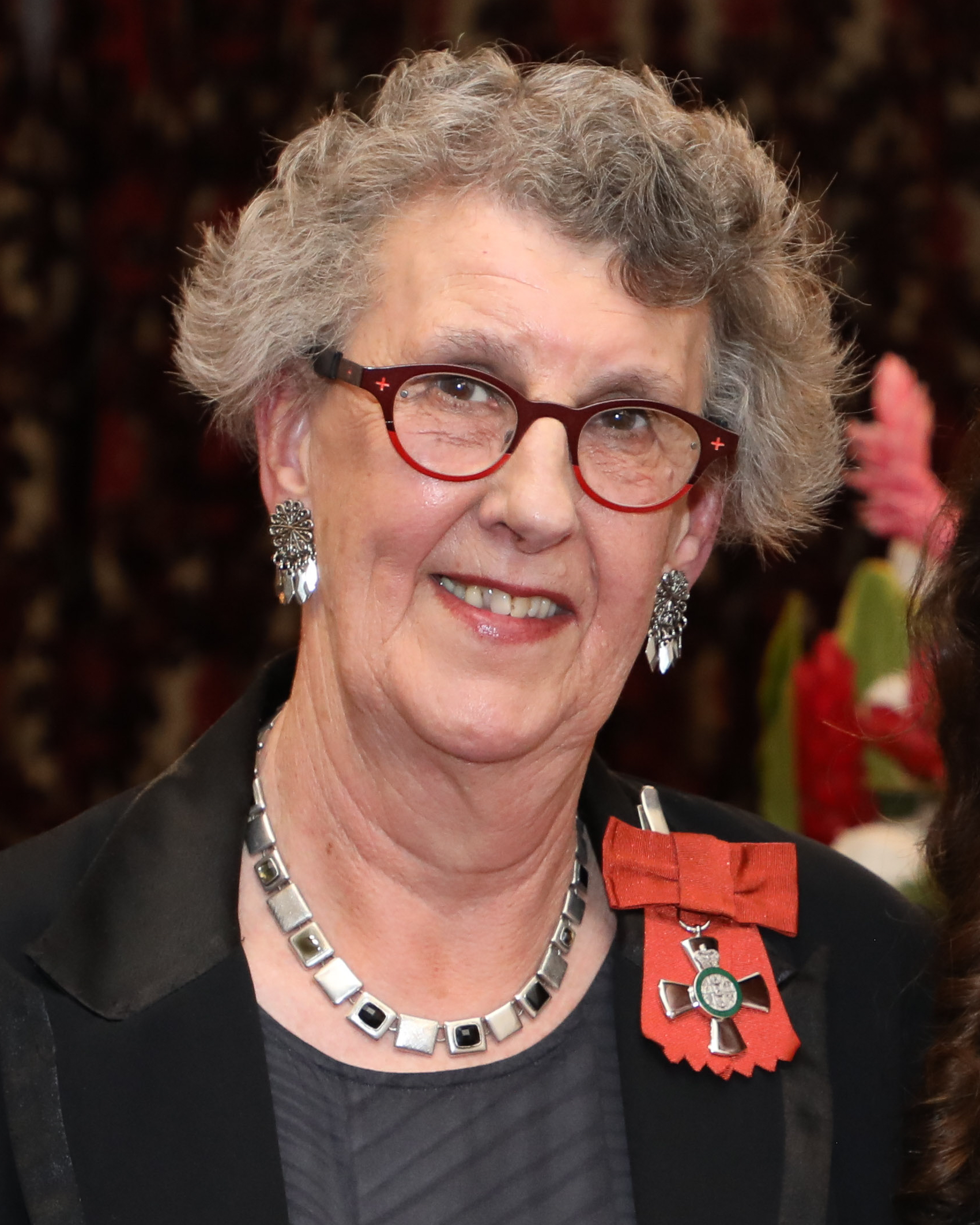
Anna Rogers

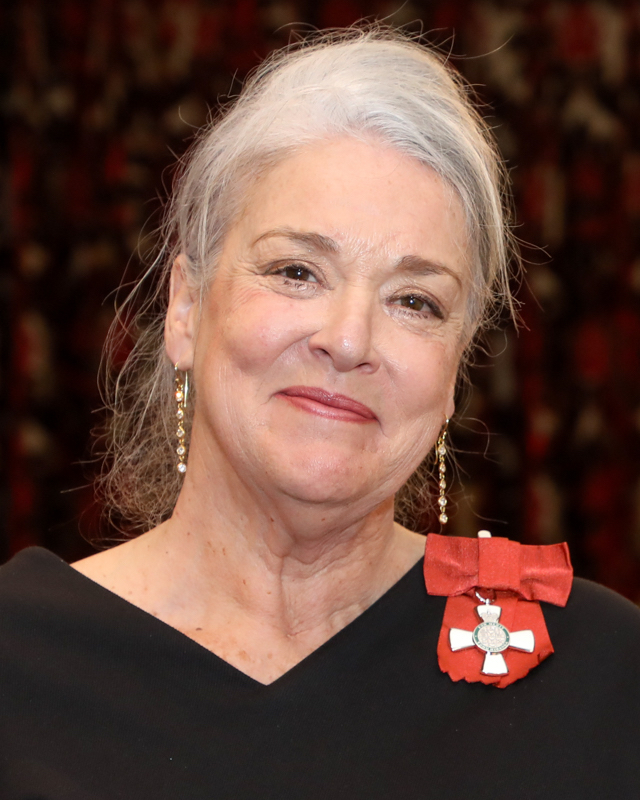
Nicola Saker

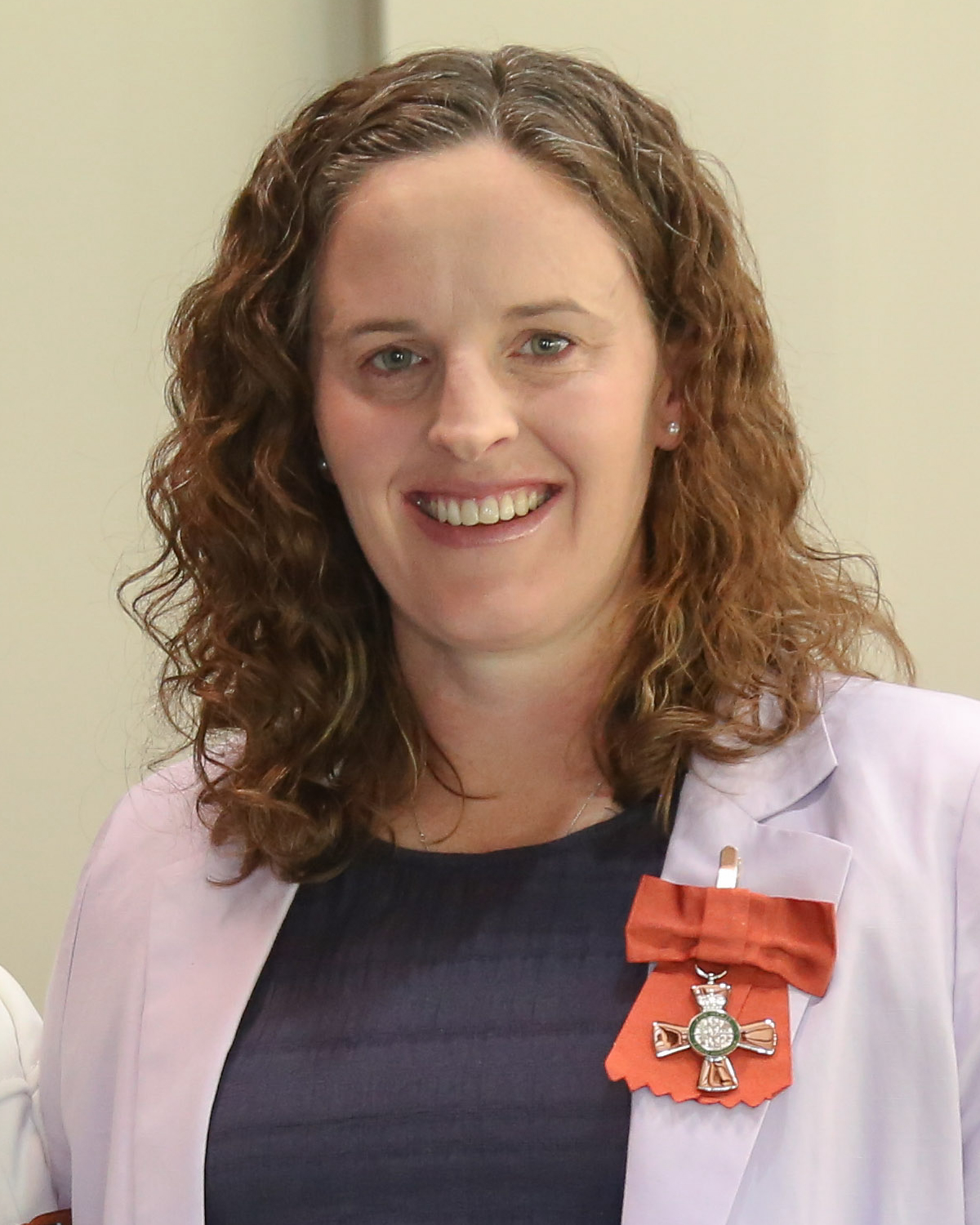
Amy Satterthwaite

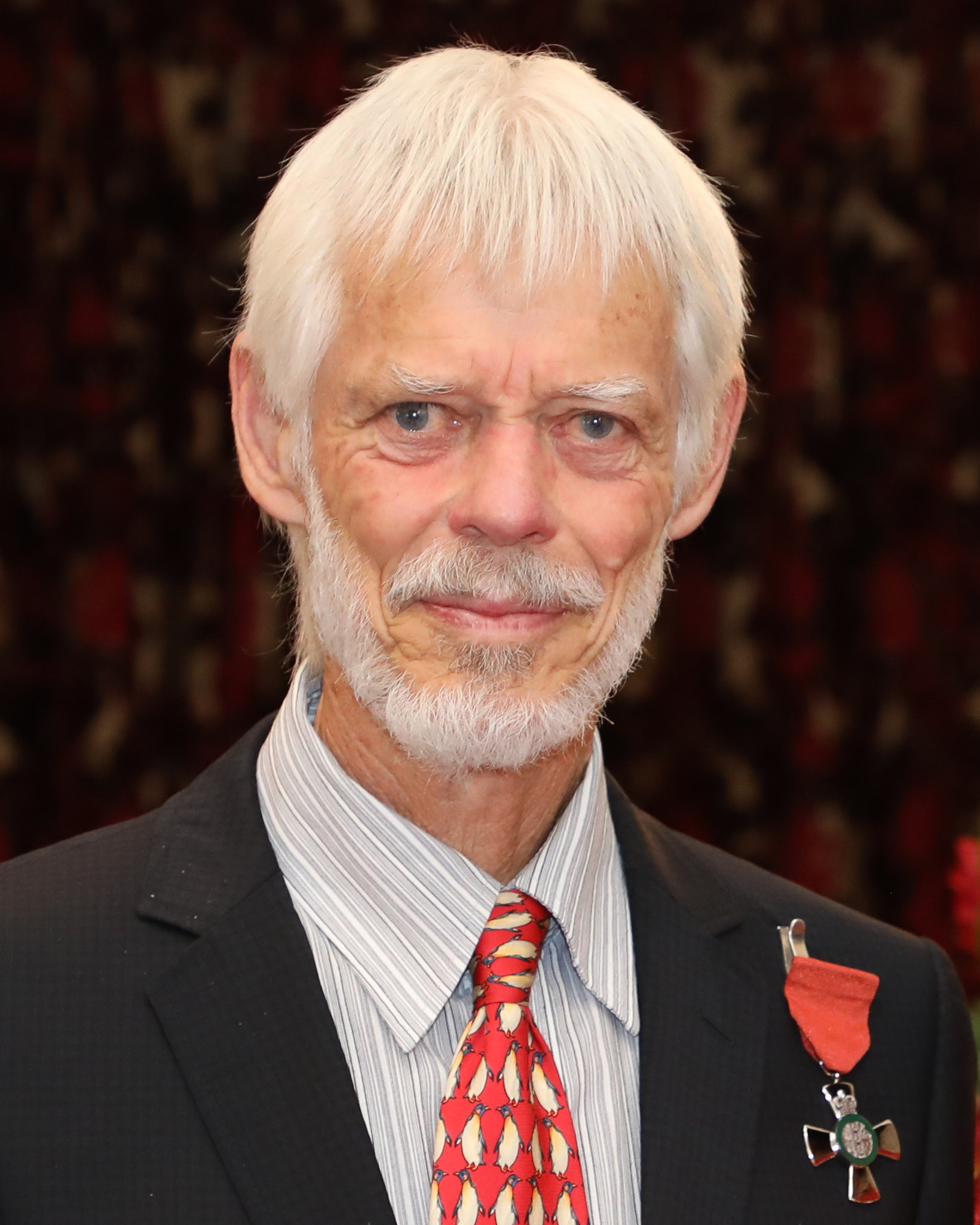
Derek Shaw

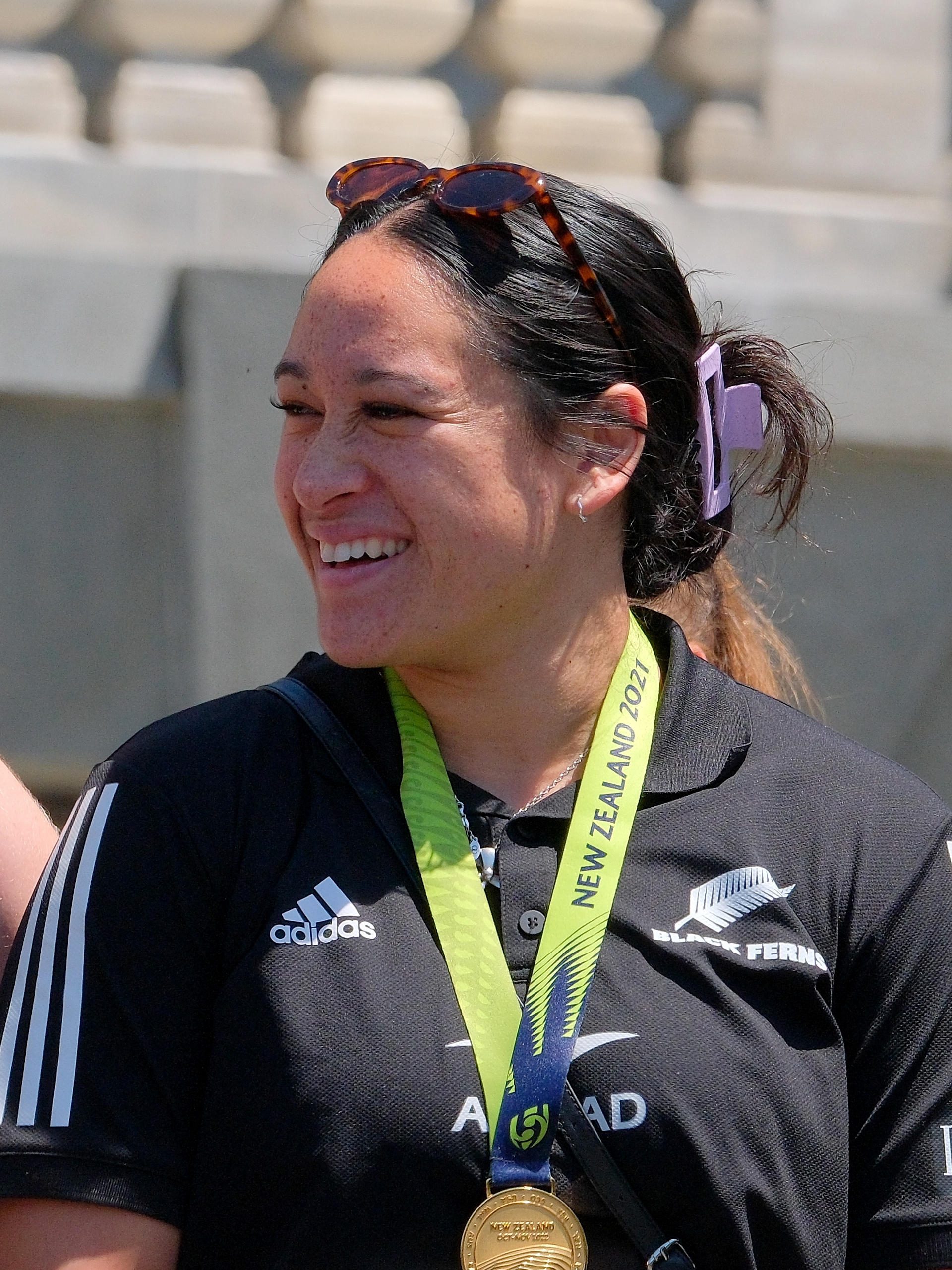
Kennedy Simon

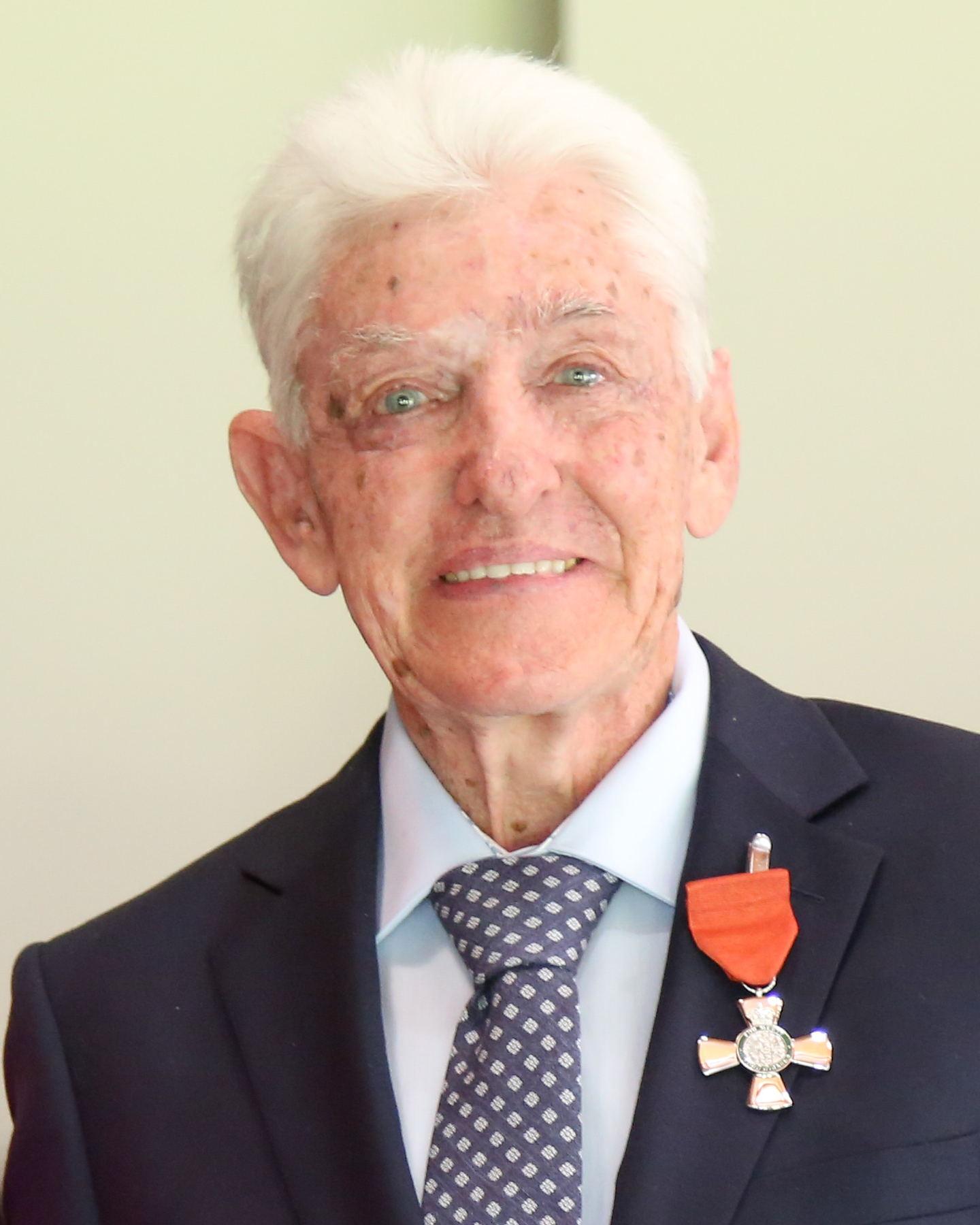
Jack Sims

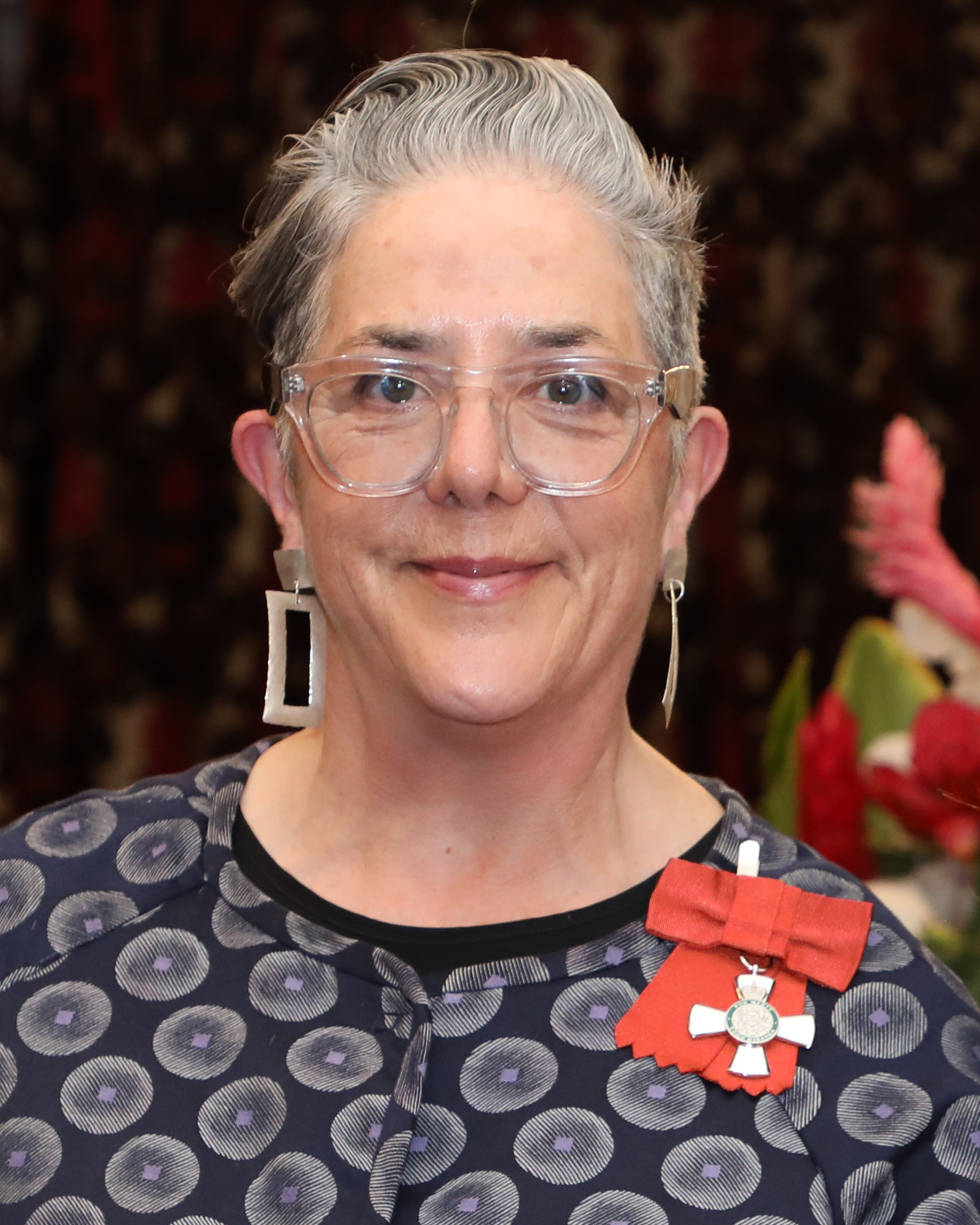
Huhana Smith

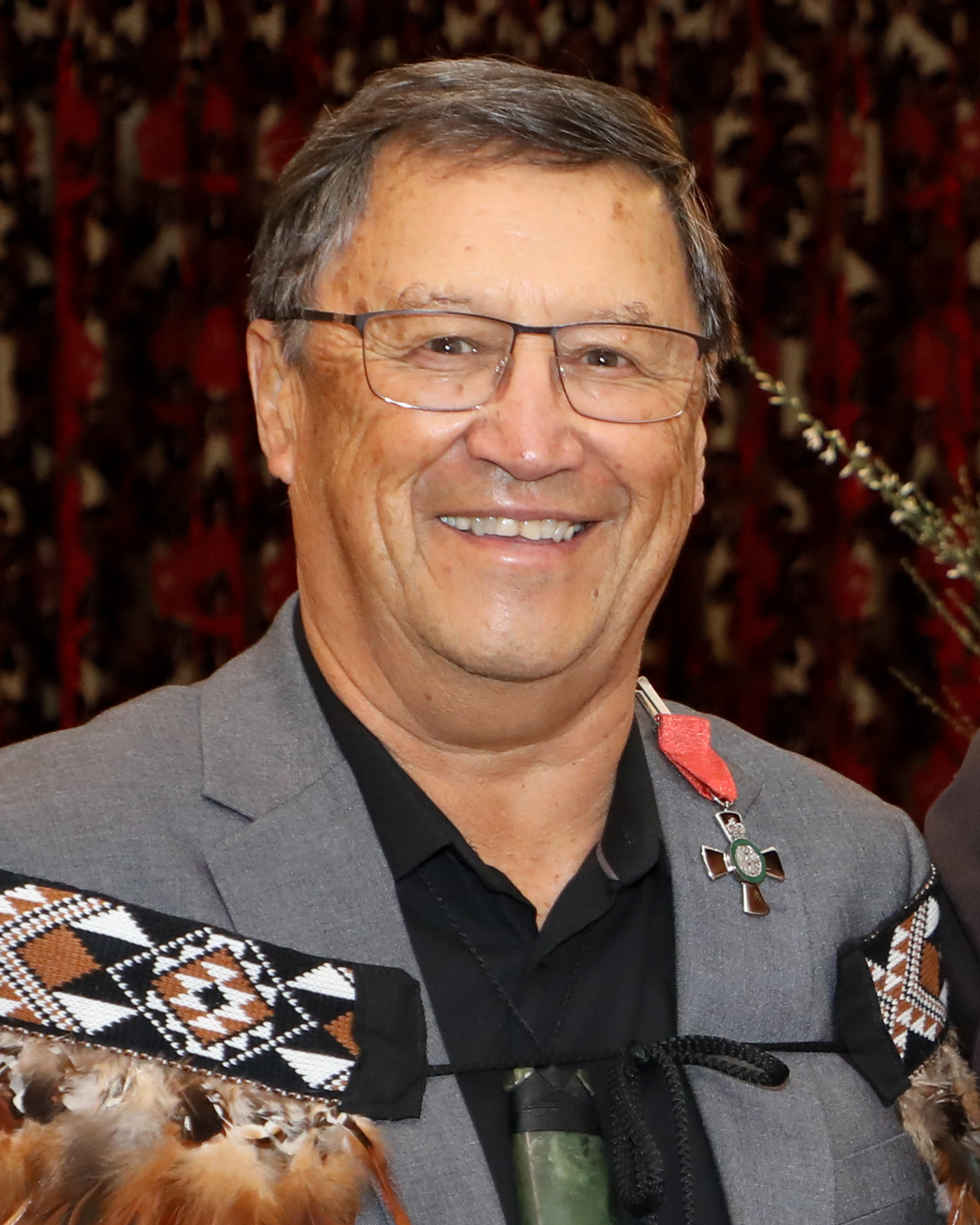
Frank Solomon

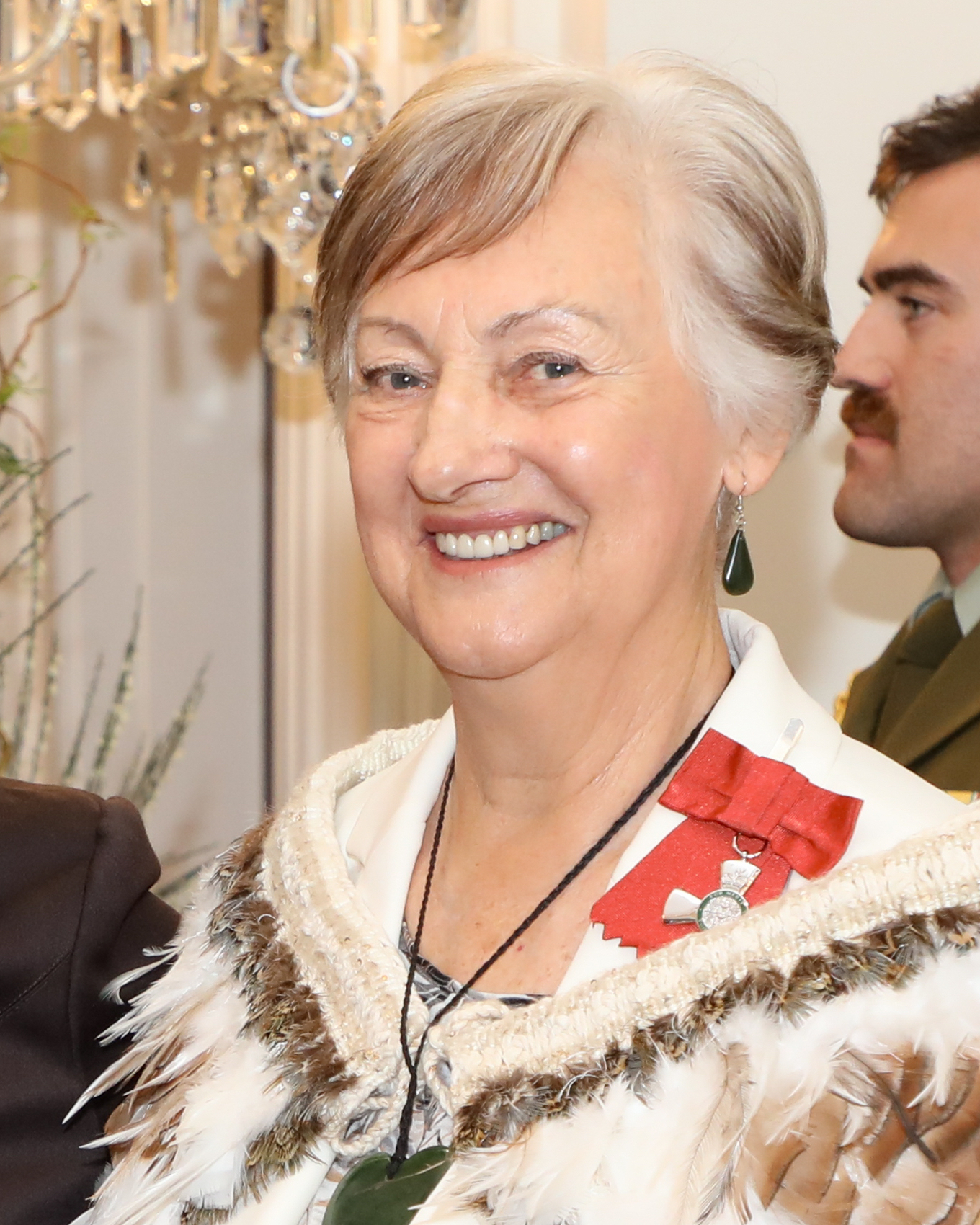
Judy Solomon

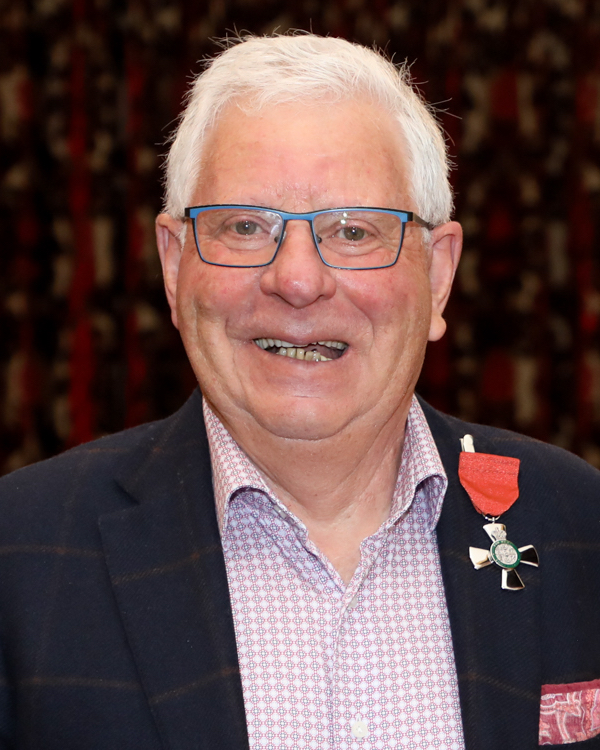
Arthur Sutherland

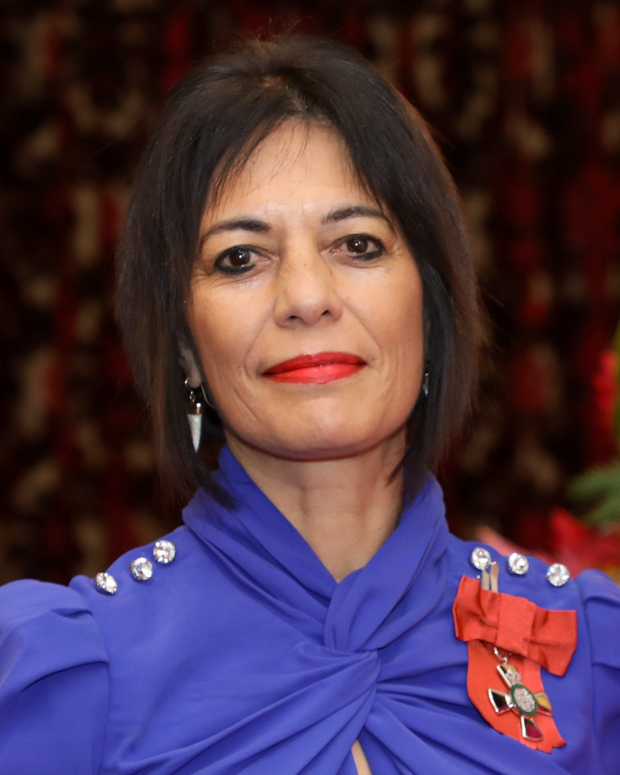
Awerangi Tamihere

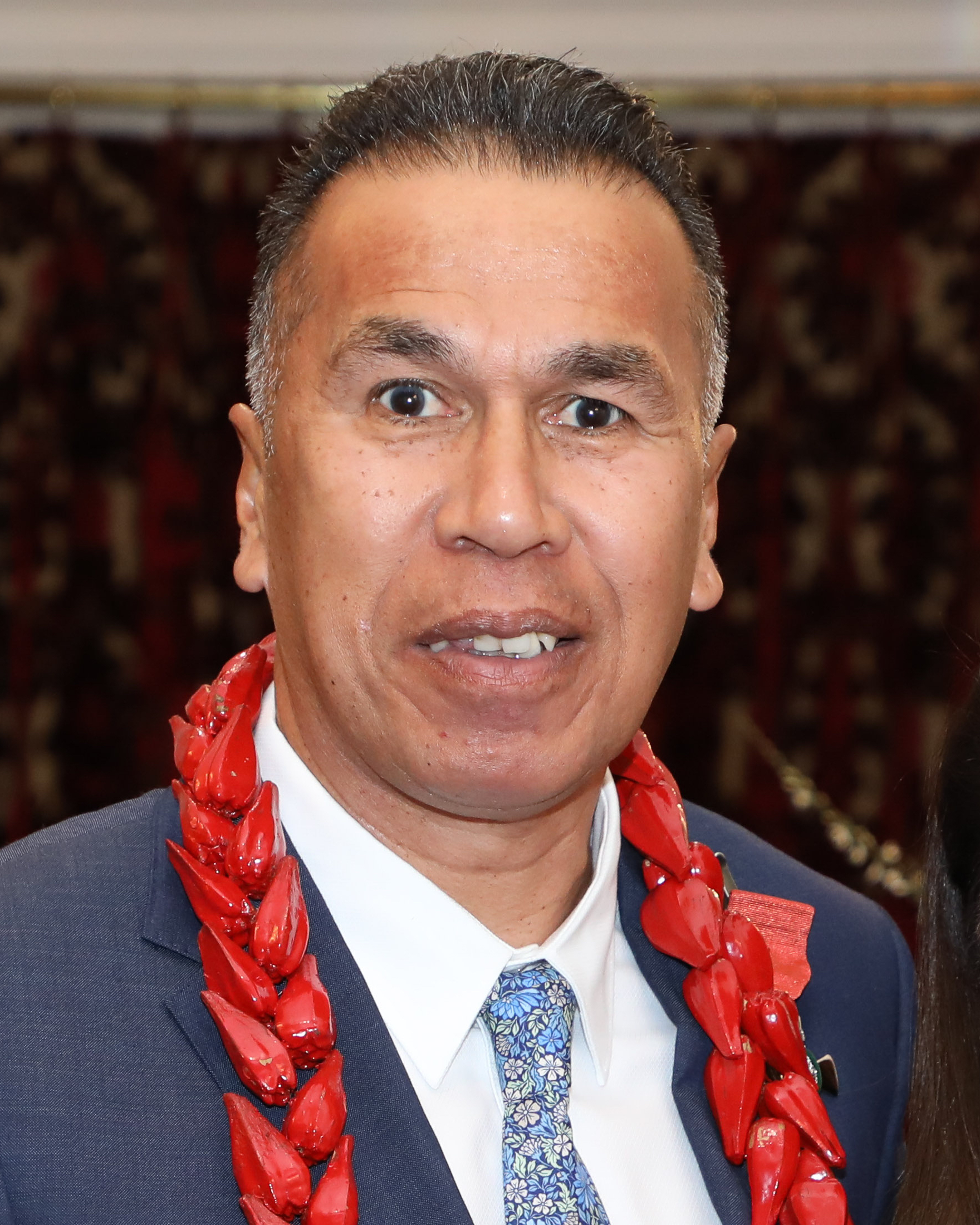
Talalelei Taufale

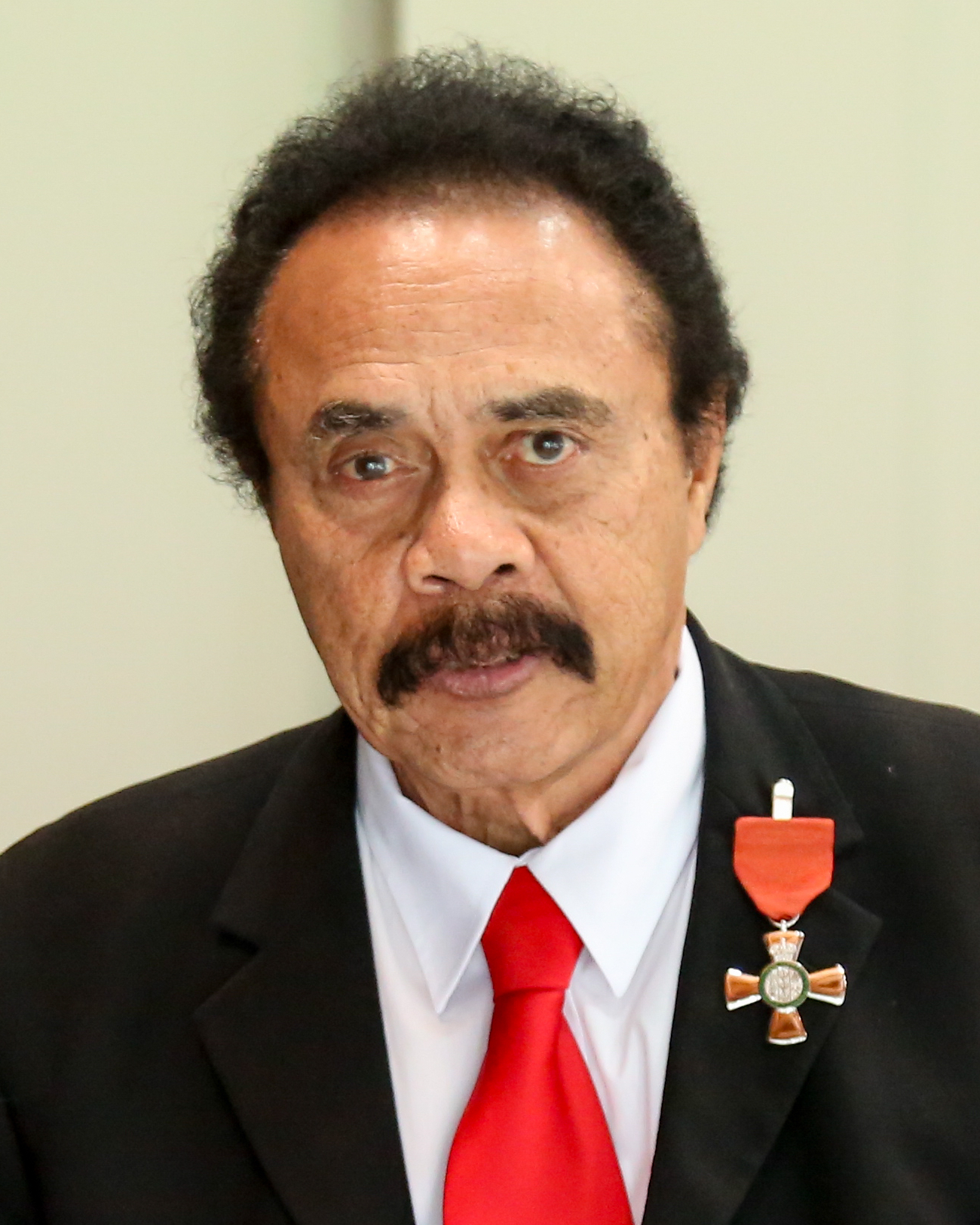
Semisi Taumoepeau

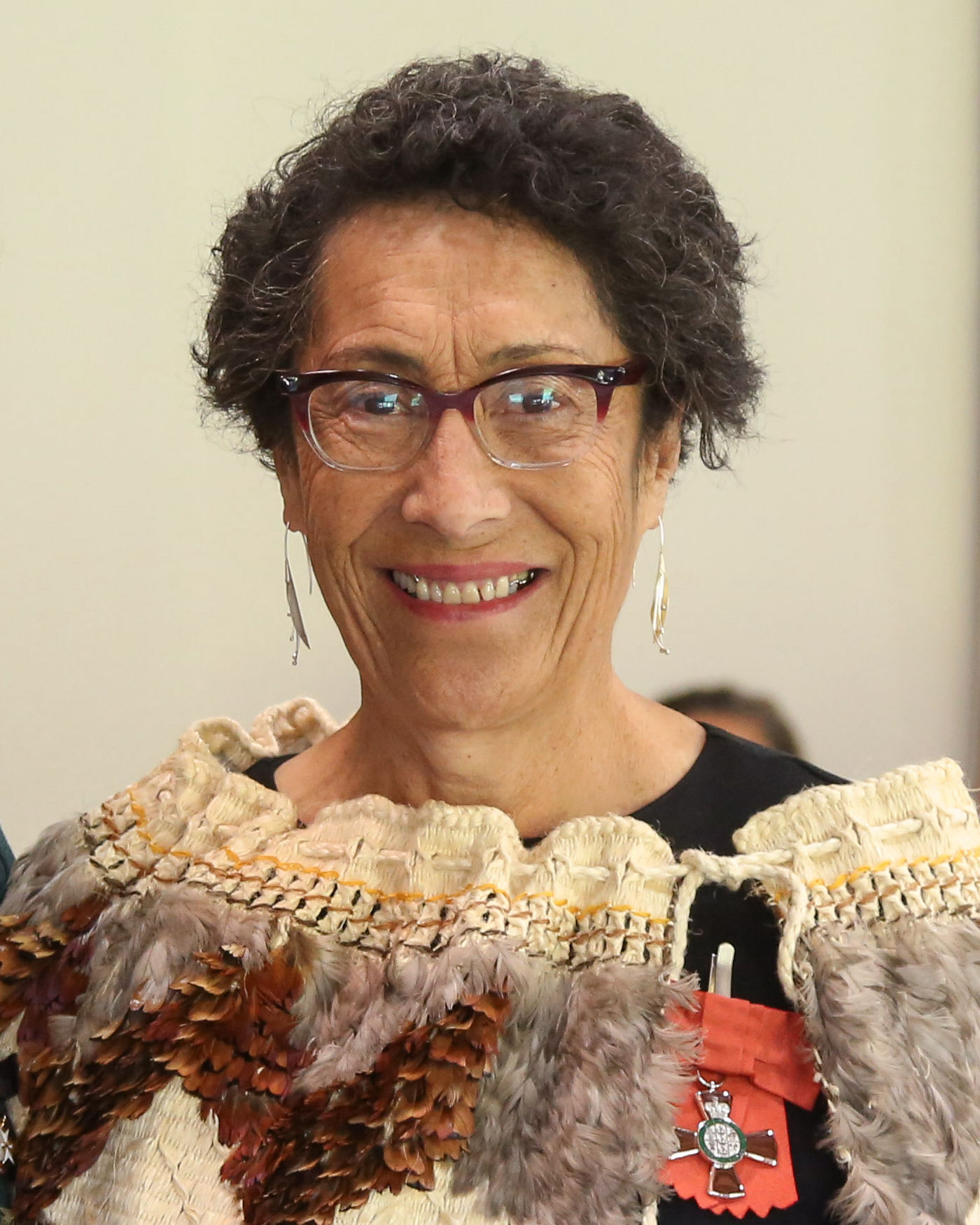
Rangi Te Kanawa

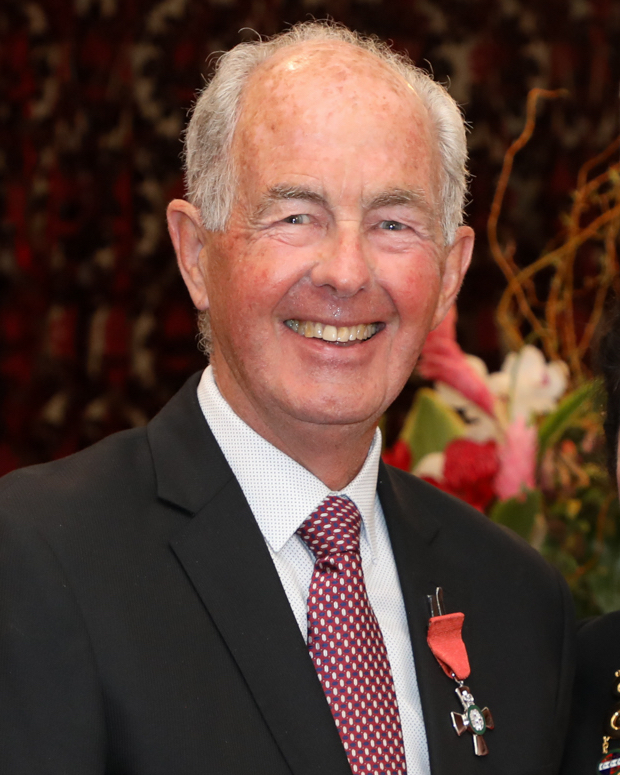
Murray Warrington

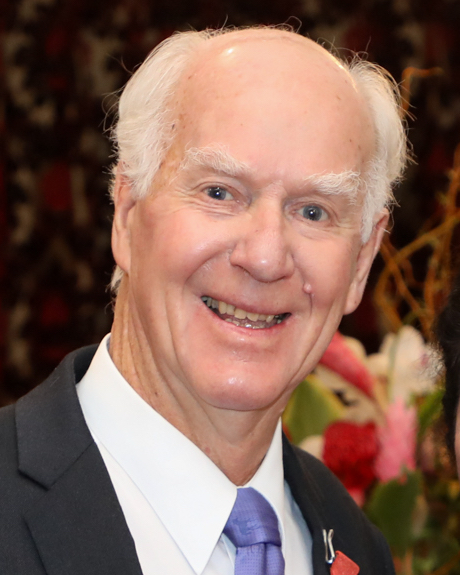
David White

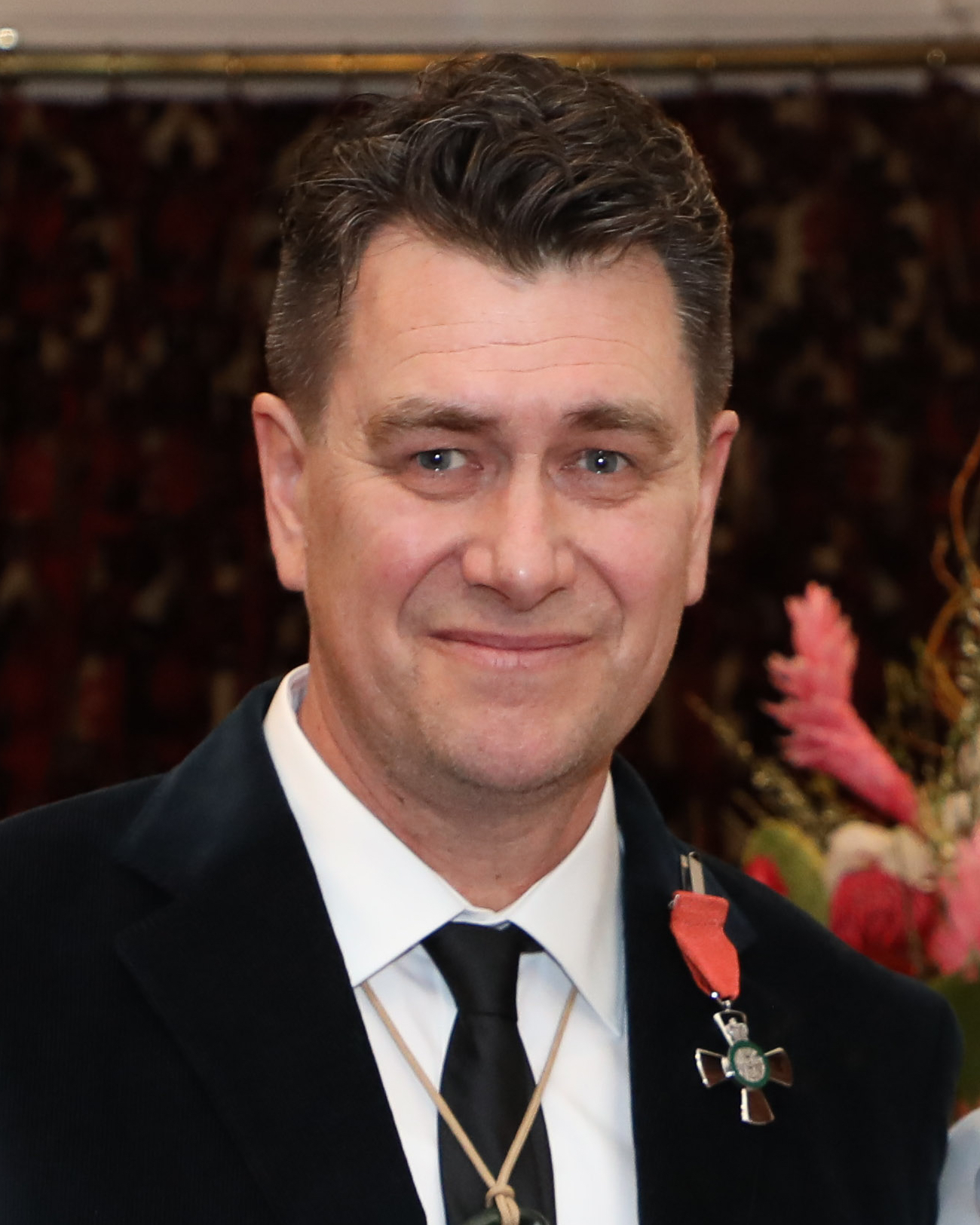
Dean Whiting

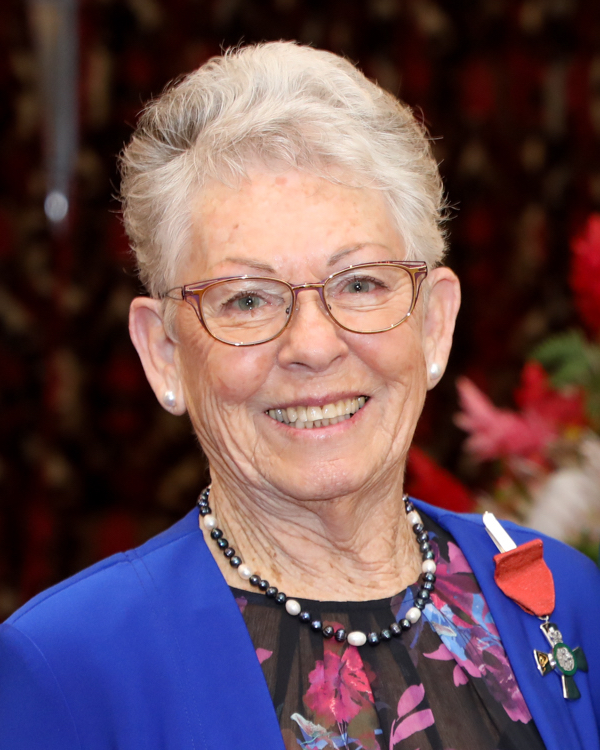
Jaki Williams

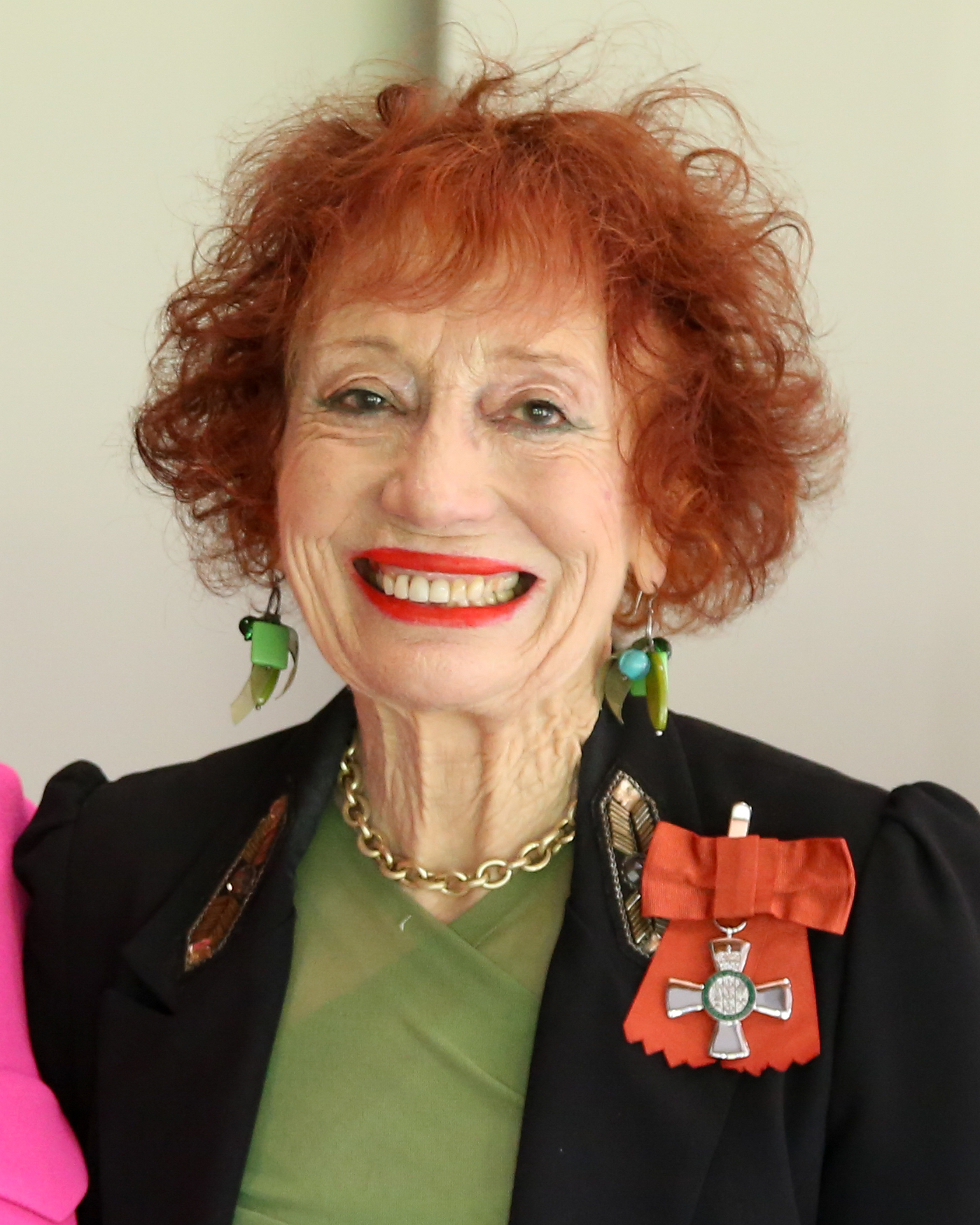
Linn Lorkin

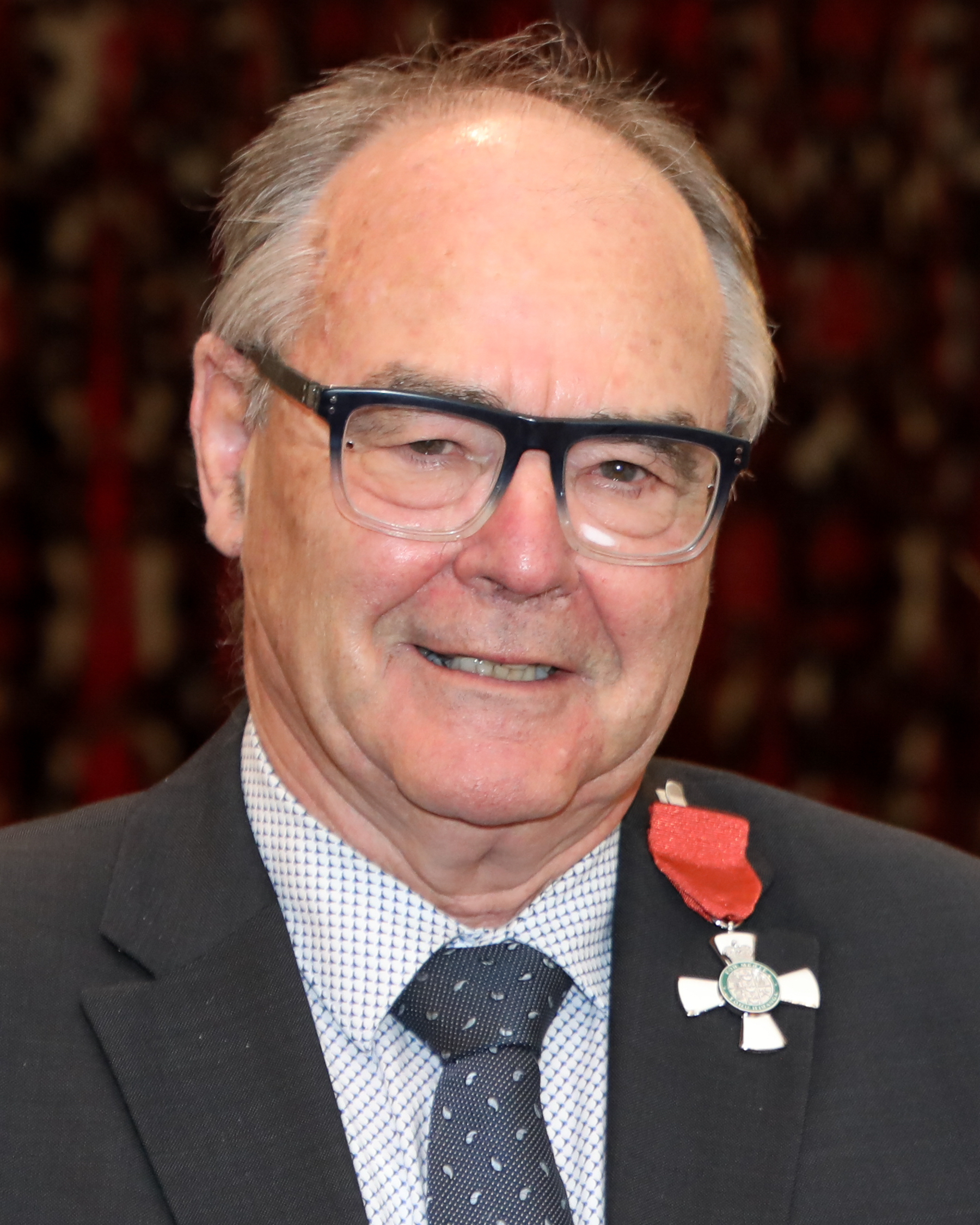
Ken Wilson

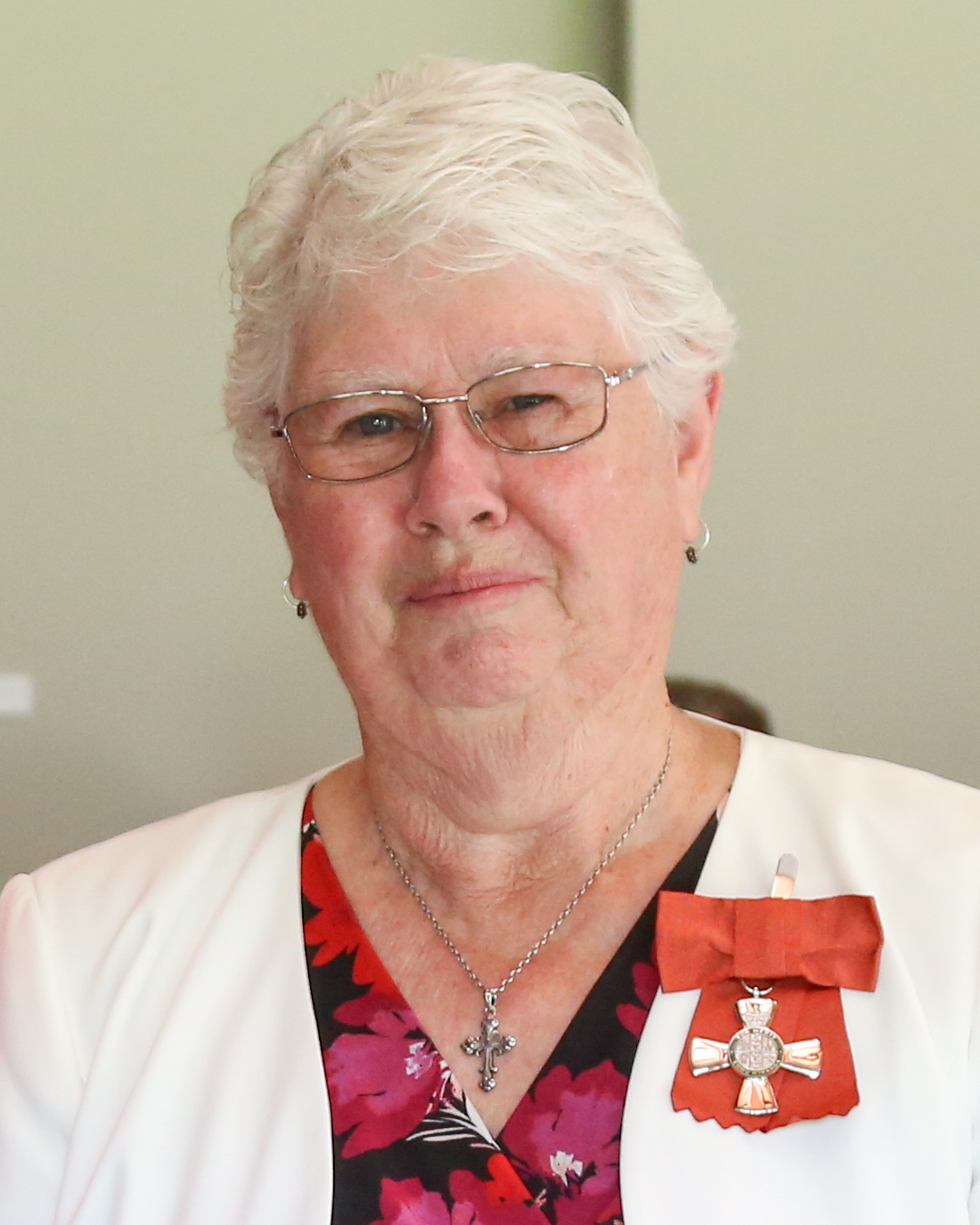
Kathryn Wood

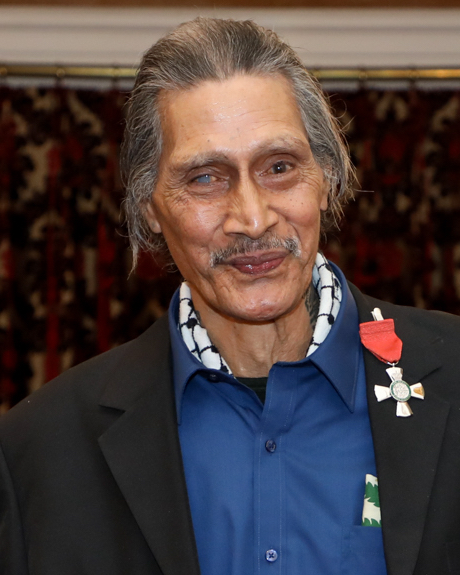
Fa'amoana Luafutu

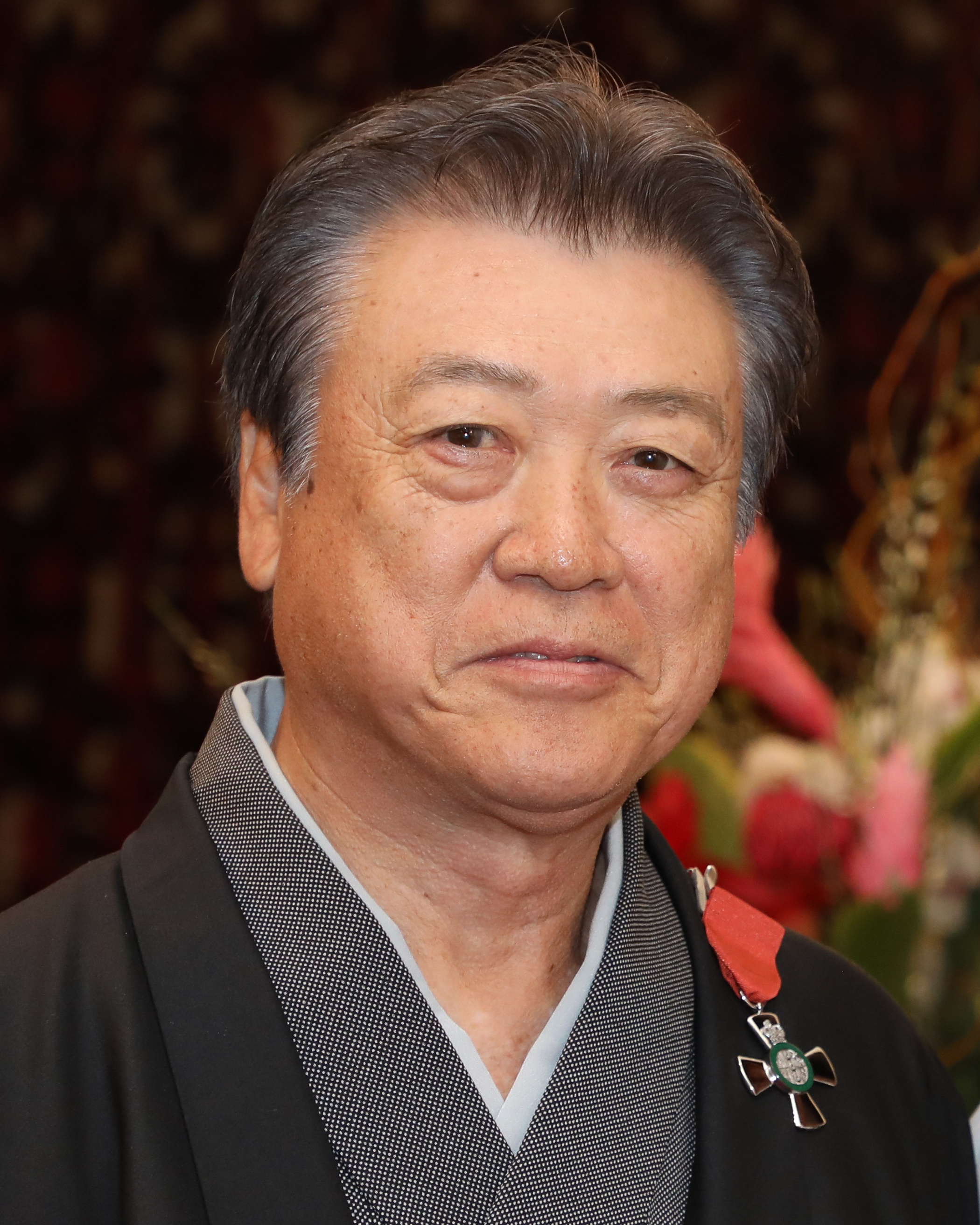
Fumiyuku Saijo

== Queen's Service Medal (QSM) ==
- Heniaka August – of Porirua. For services to Māori and the community.
- Peggy Ann Barriball JP – of Thames. For services to the community.
- Dianne Joy Buchan JP – of Ōtaki. For services to the community and environment.
- Colleen Helen Carr – of Lake Hāwea. For services to the community.
- Stella Frances Cattle – of Auckland. For services to the community and seniors.
- Venus Mary Cherrington – of Kaikohe. For services to health and the community.
- Derek Boyd Collier JP – of Whitianga. For services to Fire and Emergency New Zealand and the community.
- Ralph John Correa JP – of Whangārei. For services to the Indian community.
- Lynne Cousins – of Wellington. For services to social welfare.
- Joseph Davis – of Auckland. For services to the Fijian community.
- Dr Handunnethi Kolitha De Silva – of Lower Hutt. For services to health.
- Brian Leslie Doughty – of Whanganui. For services to rural communities and outdoor recreation.
- Richard Harold Dunkerton – of Whangārei. For services to swimming.
- Dr Mary Angela Eastham – of Feilding. For services to interfaith communities.
- Anthony Louis Fortune JP – of Reefton. For services to the community.
- Catriona McDonald Foster – of Auckland. For services to the nursing.
- Peggy Joyce Frew – of Ohakune. For services to the community.
- Shirley Douglas Gillard JP – of Te Aroha. For services to the community.
- Rodney James Graham – of Ōtaki. For services to the community.
- Kate Lorraine Hargraves – of Auckland. For services to the community.
- James Donald Hazlett – of Naseby. For services to Fire and Emergency New Zealand and the community.
- Peter Thomas Housiaux – of Ōtaki. For services to surf lifesaving and canoe polo.
- Robin Ethnye Jackson – of Invercargill. For services to swimming.
- Karen Desiree Knudson – of Dunedin. For services to choral music.
- Reverend Alofa Ta'ase Lale – of Dunedin. For services to the community.
- Richard Hunter Lemon – of Ashburton. For services to the agriculture and pastoral industry.
- Bernice Monica Lepper – of Alexandra. For services to the community and education.
- Ngaio Patricia Lewis – of Waiheke Island. For services to charitable fundraising.
- Diane Frances Martin JP – of Katikati. For services to the community.
- Geoffrey William Mayall – of Kaikohe. For services to Fire and Emergency New Zealand and the community.
- Karen Ann McClintock – of Timaru. For services to the community.
- Miraka Cynthia Norgate – of Nelson. For services to the community.
- Teremoana O Ma Hodges (Teremoana Maua-Hodges) – of Porirua. For services to sport and culture.
- Antony Mark Pettinger – of Dunedin. For services to outdoor recreation.
- Kane Kahora Rangitonga – of Te Awamutu. For services to social work and the community.
- Susan Reardon – of Whangaparāoa. For services to nursing.
- Neil Alexander Robbie – of Foxton Beach. For services to Fire and Emergency New Zealand and the community.
- Glenys Anne Scandrett – of Dunedin. For services to dance.
- Kirsty Jean Sharpe JP – of Queenstown. For services to the community.
- Stephen Garry Shaw – of Cromwell. For services to Fire and Emergency New Zealand and hockey.
- Reverend Margaret (Penny) Ruth Sinnamon – of Omakau. For services to the community.
- Ronald George Smith – of Methven. For services to the community and Search and Rescue.
- Sylvia Mary Smith – of Morrinsville. For services to netball.
- Dr Sivagnanaratanam SriRamaratnam – of Wellington. For services to the Tamil community.
- Marcia Rei Te Au-Thomson JP – of Invercargill. For services to seniors, Māori and health.
- Raana Amelia Thelma Tuuta – of Chatham Islands. For services to Māori and the community.
- Putiani Upoko – of Auckland. For services to the Pacific community.
- Robyn Ann van Reenen – of Wānaka. For services to the arts.
- Jillian Helen Vincent – of Christchurch. For services to pipe bands.
- Patricia Mavis Wyatt – of Rotorua. For services to netball.
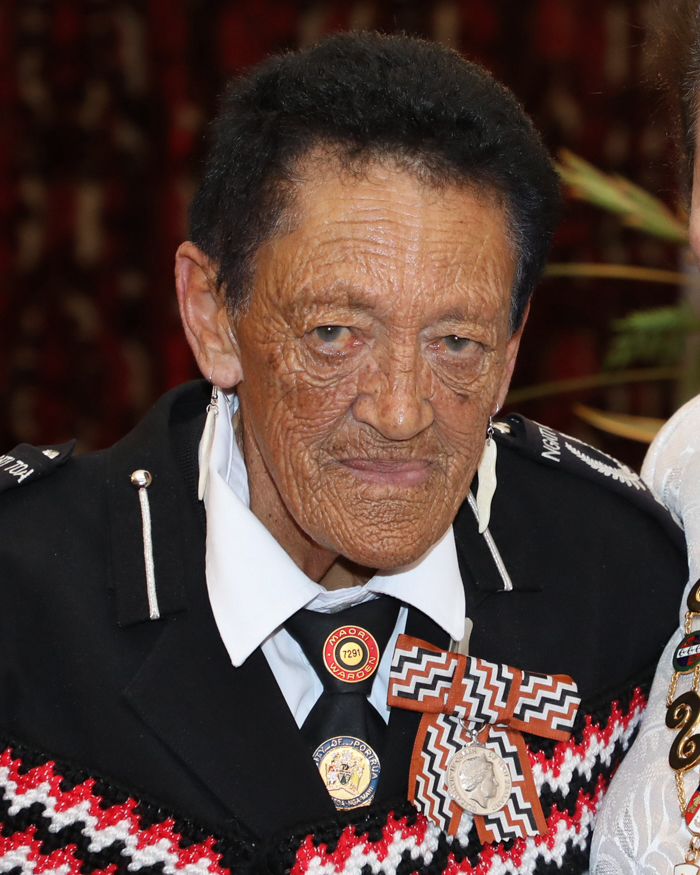
Heniaka August

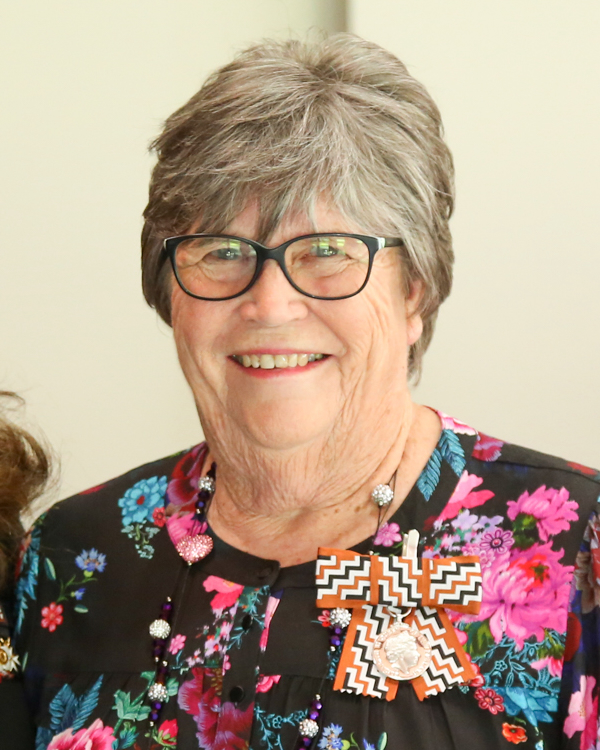
Peggy Barriball

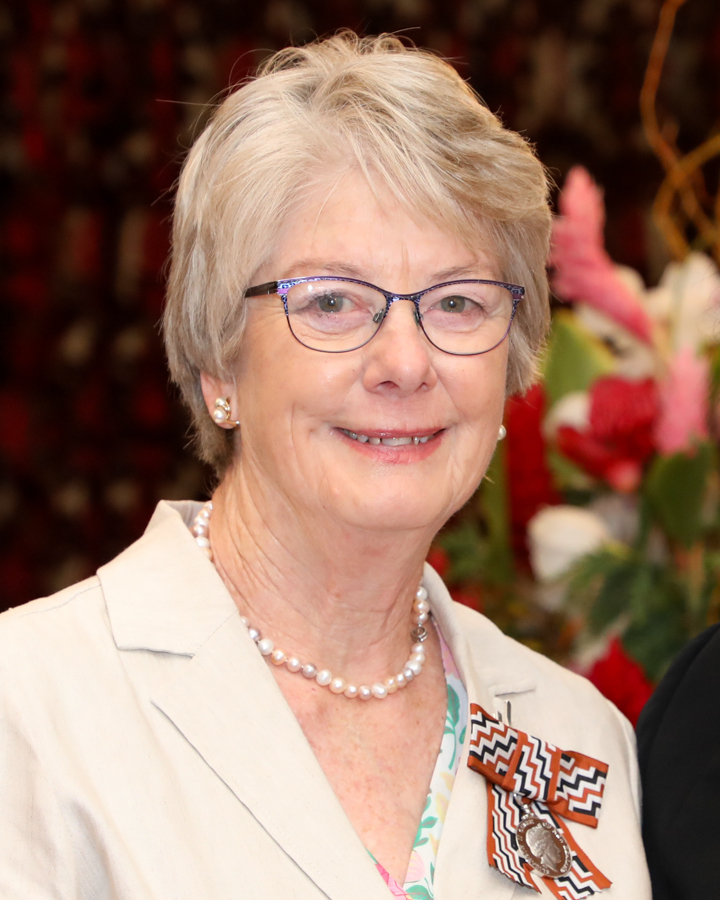
Di Buchan

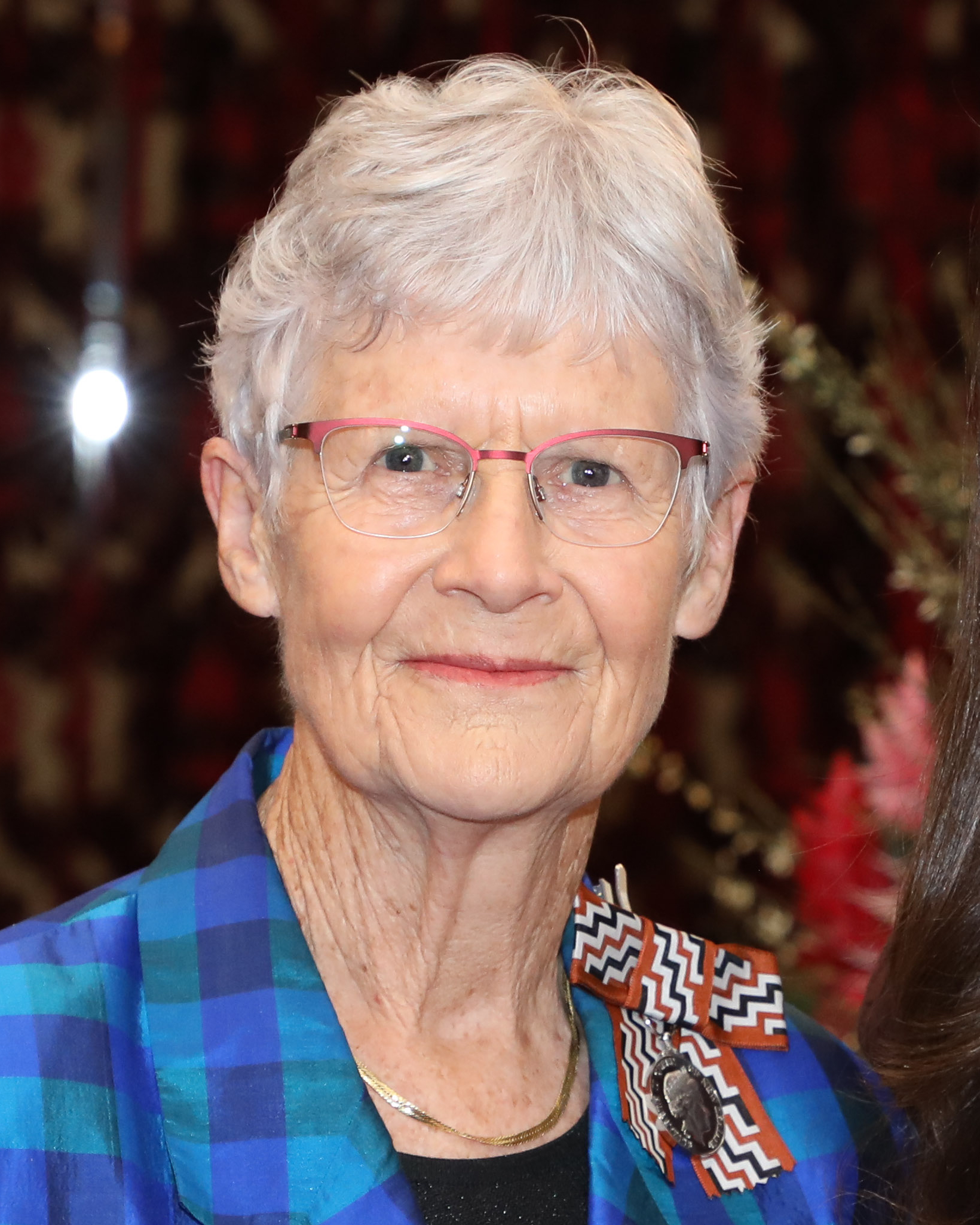
Colleen Carr

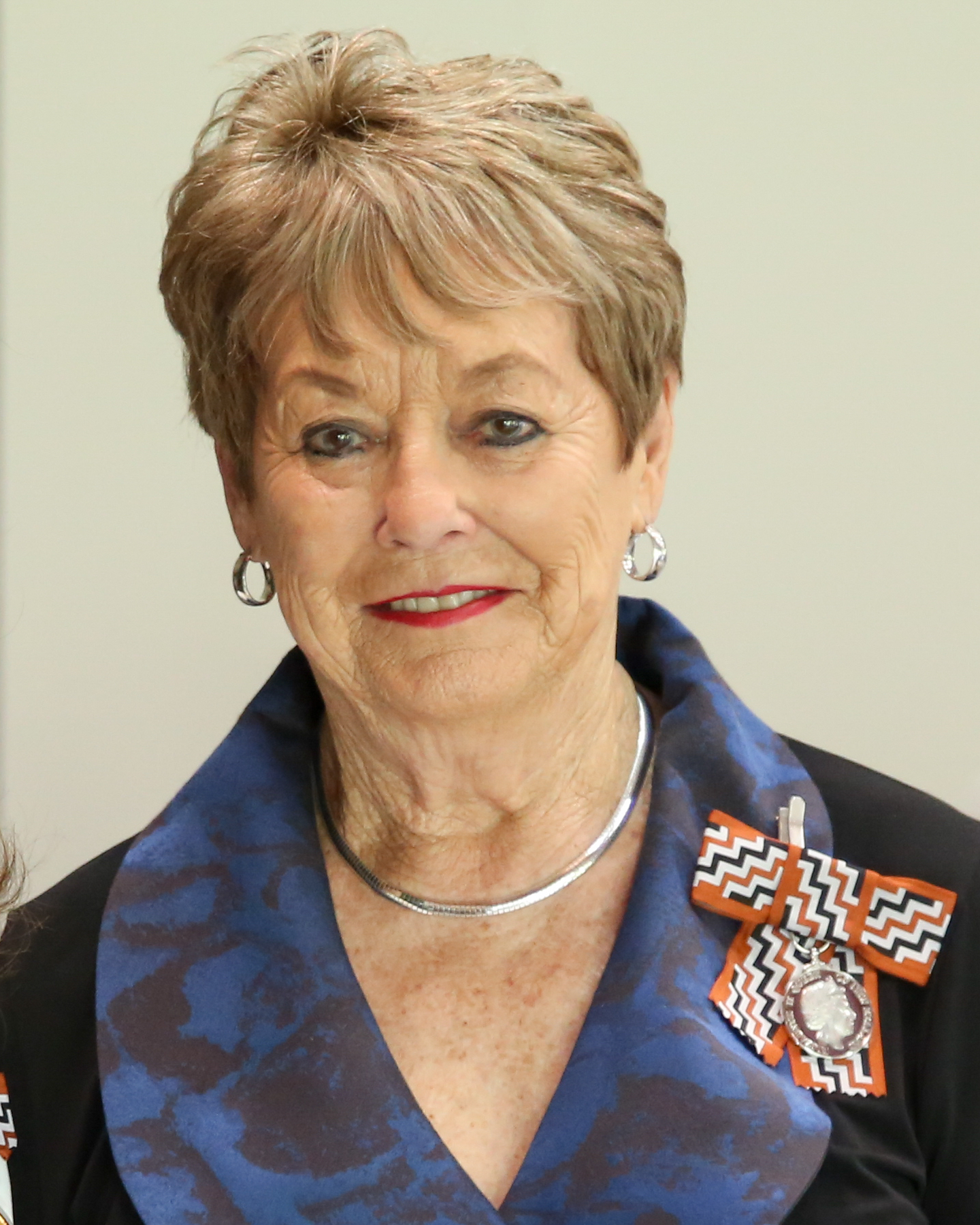
Stella Cattle

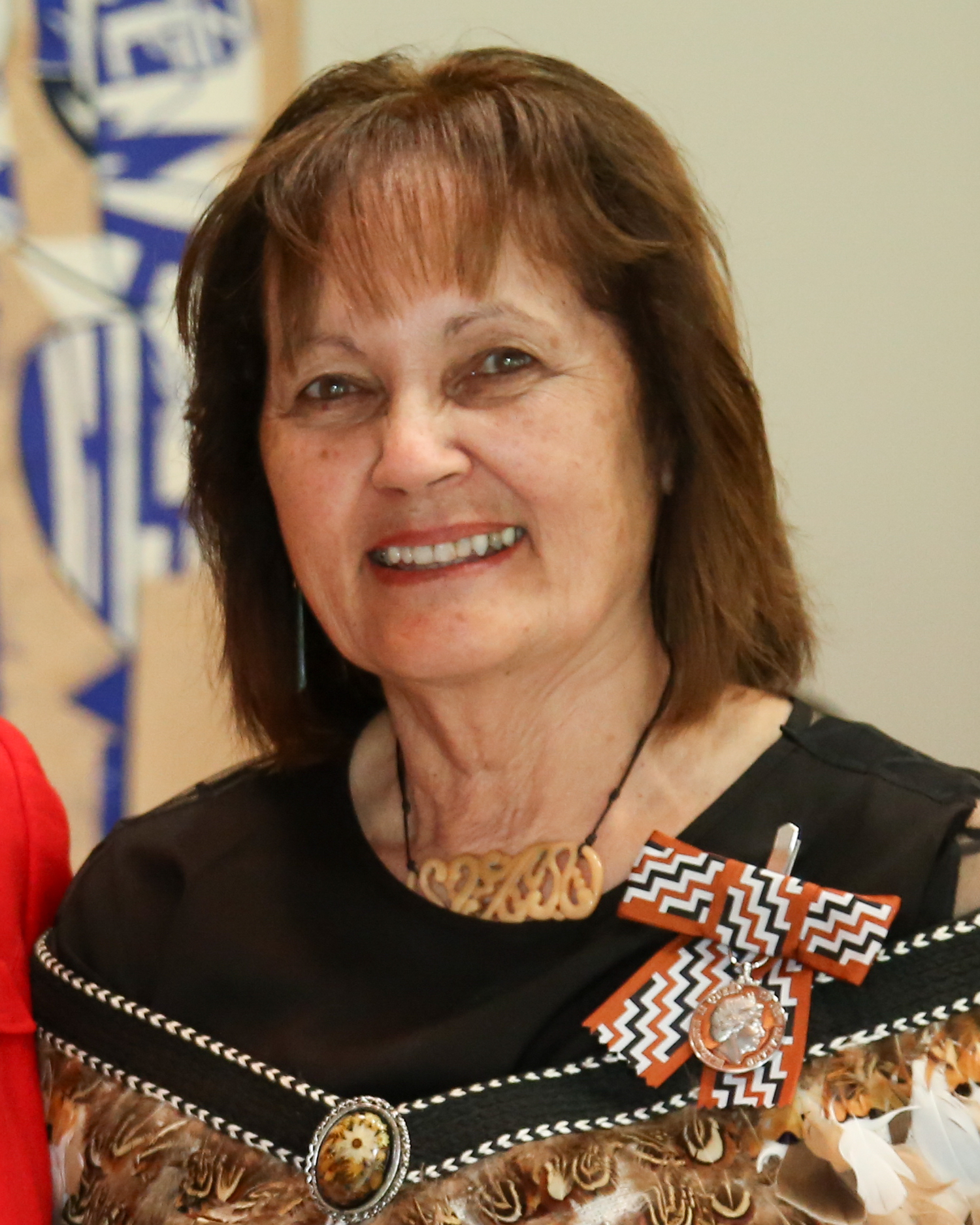
Venus Cherrington

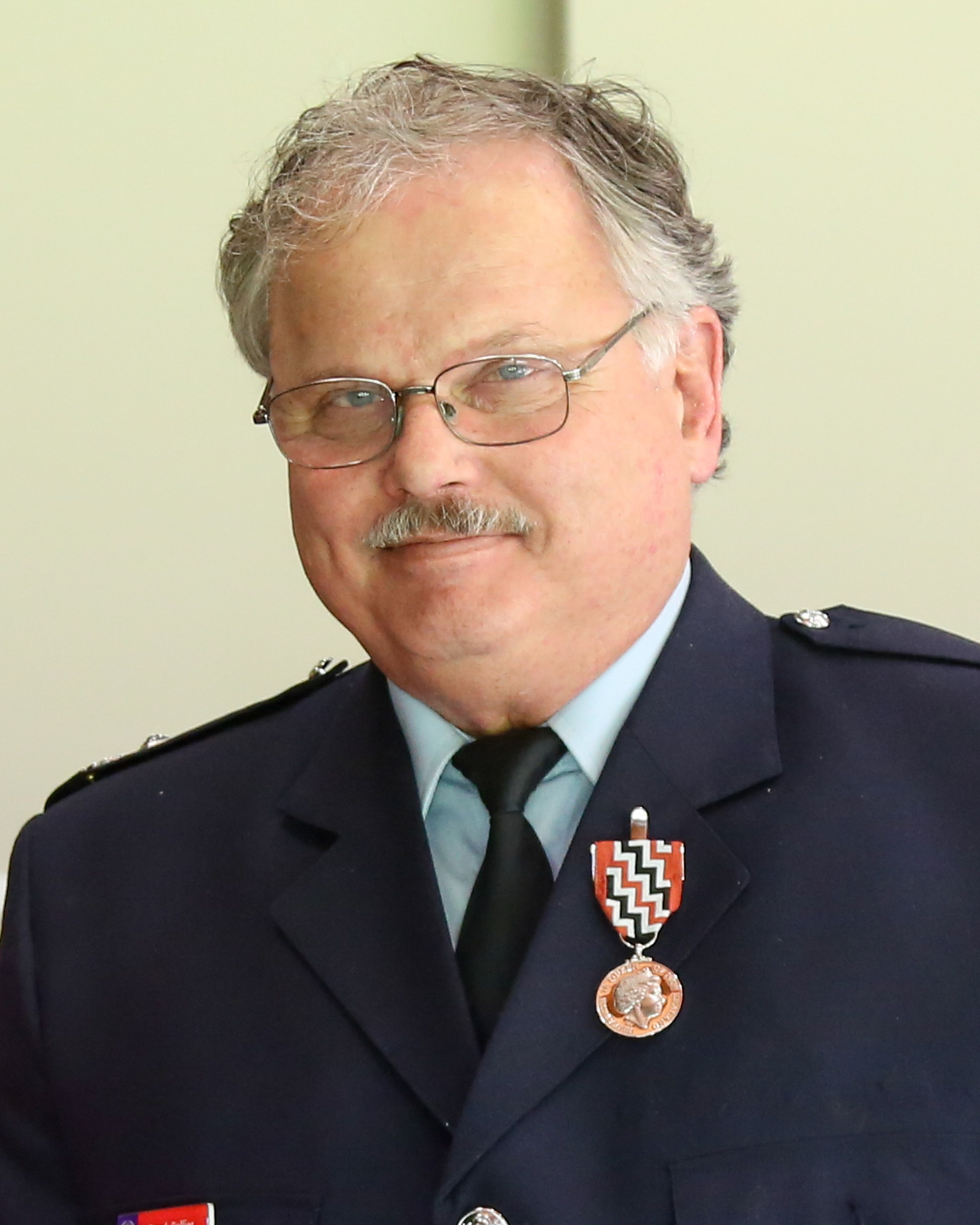
Derek Collier

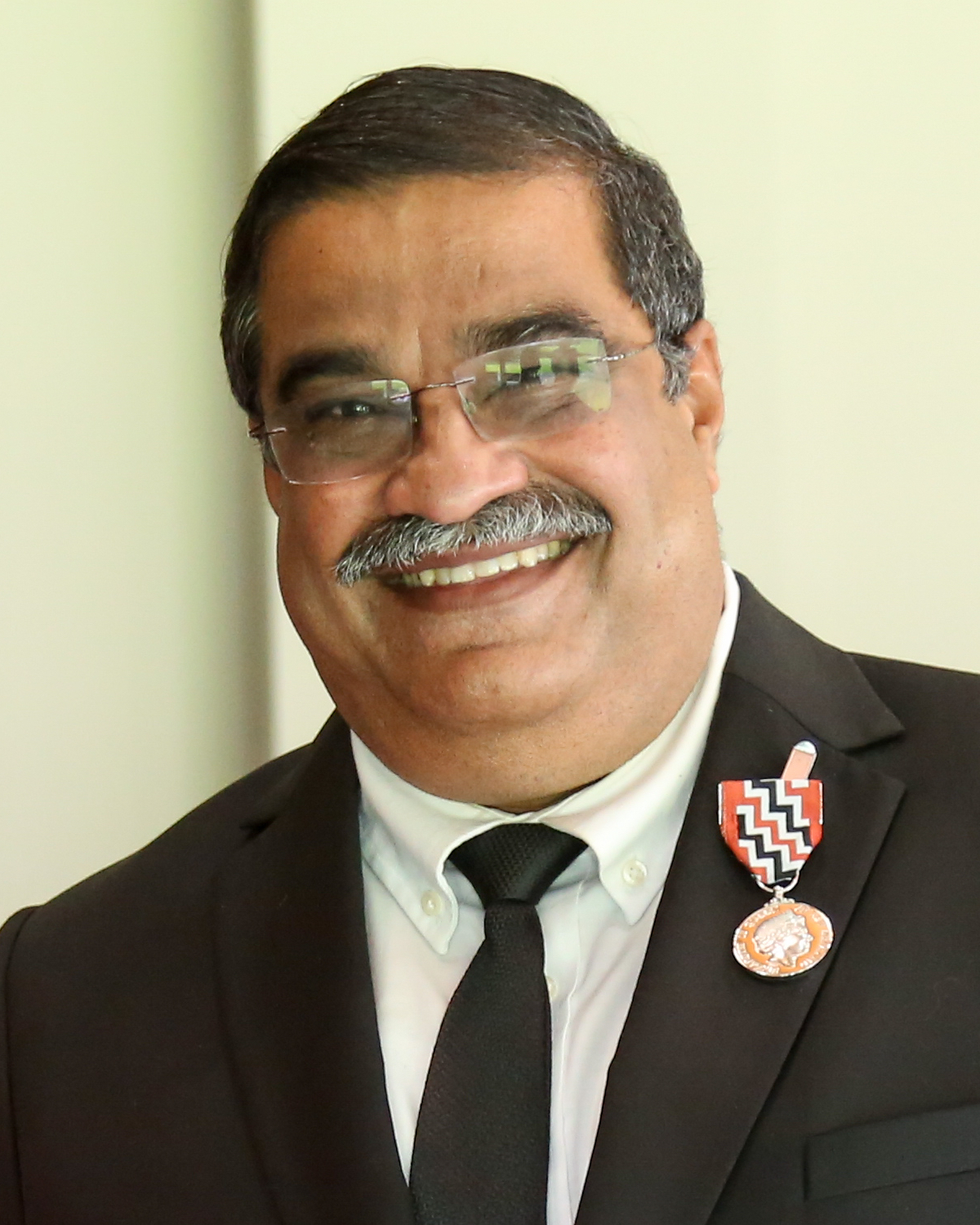
Ralph Correa

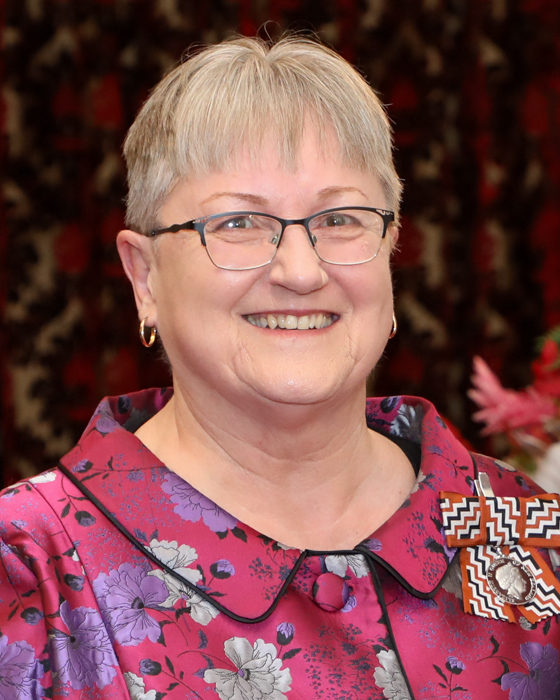
Lynne Cousins

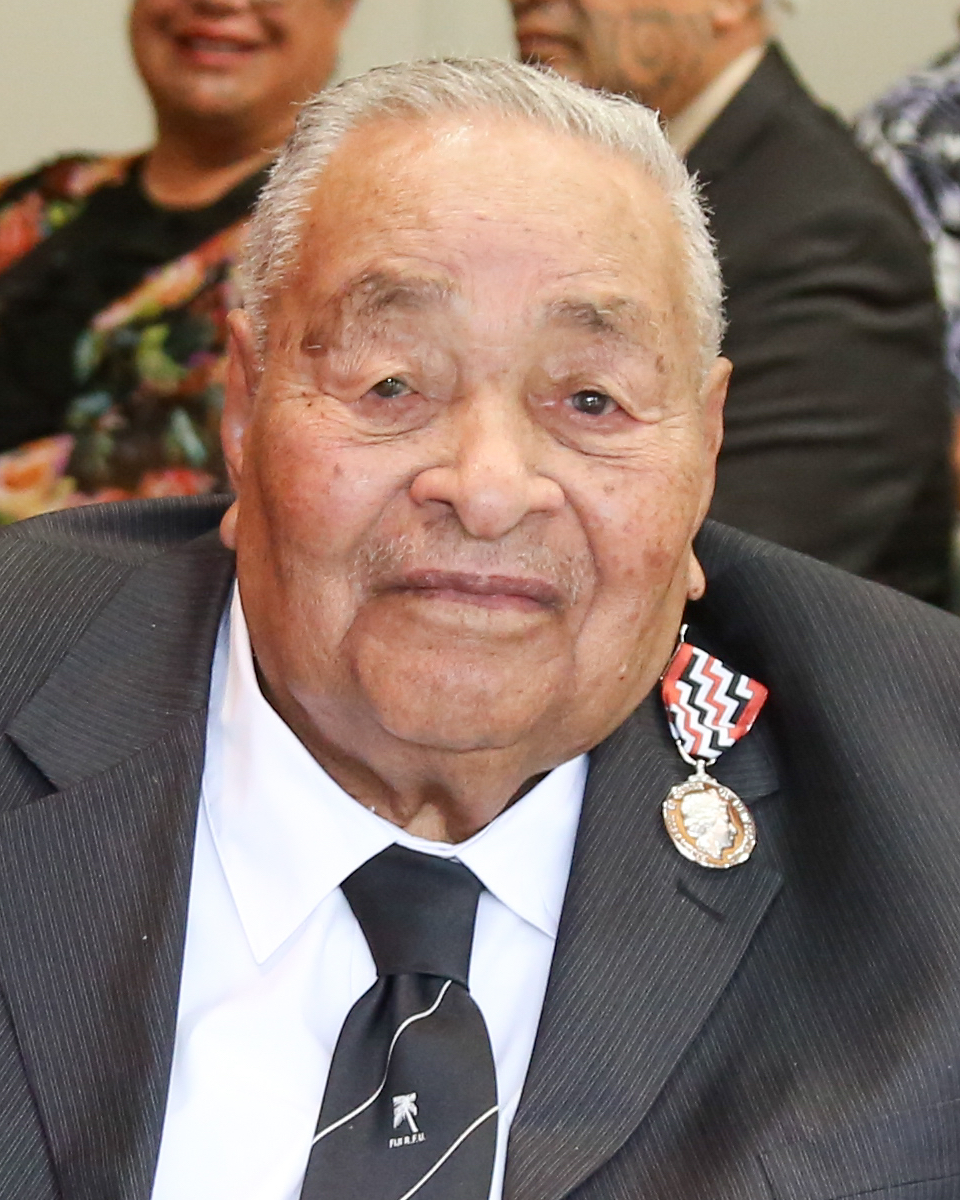
Joseph Davis

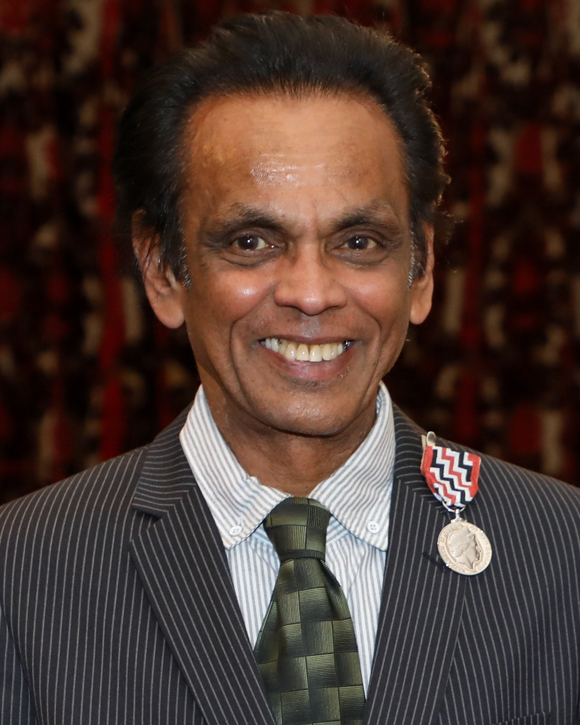
Kolitha De Silva

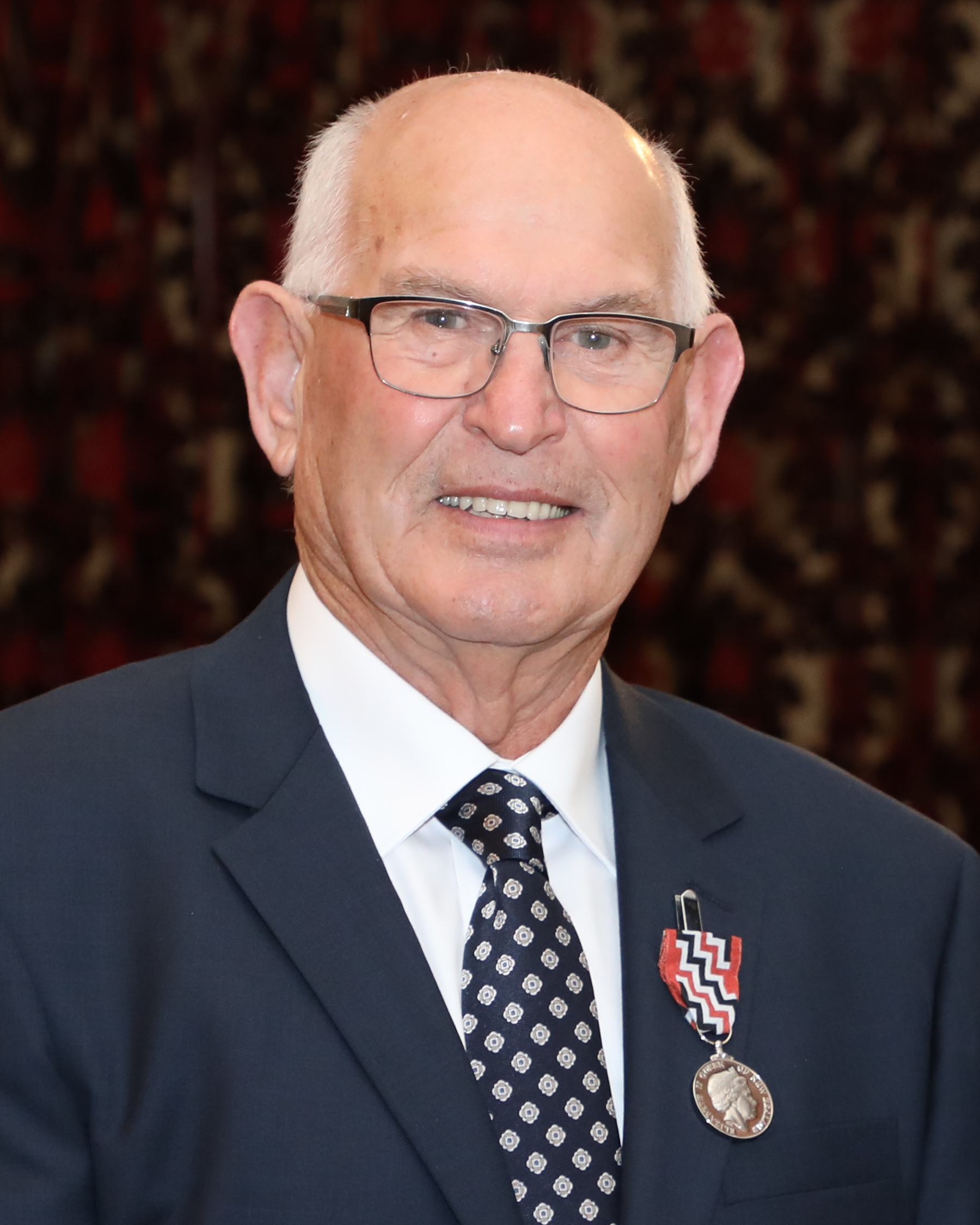
Brian Doughty

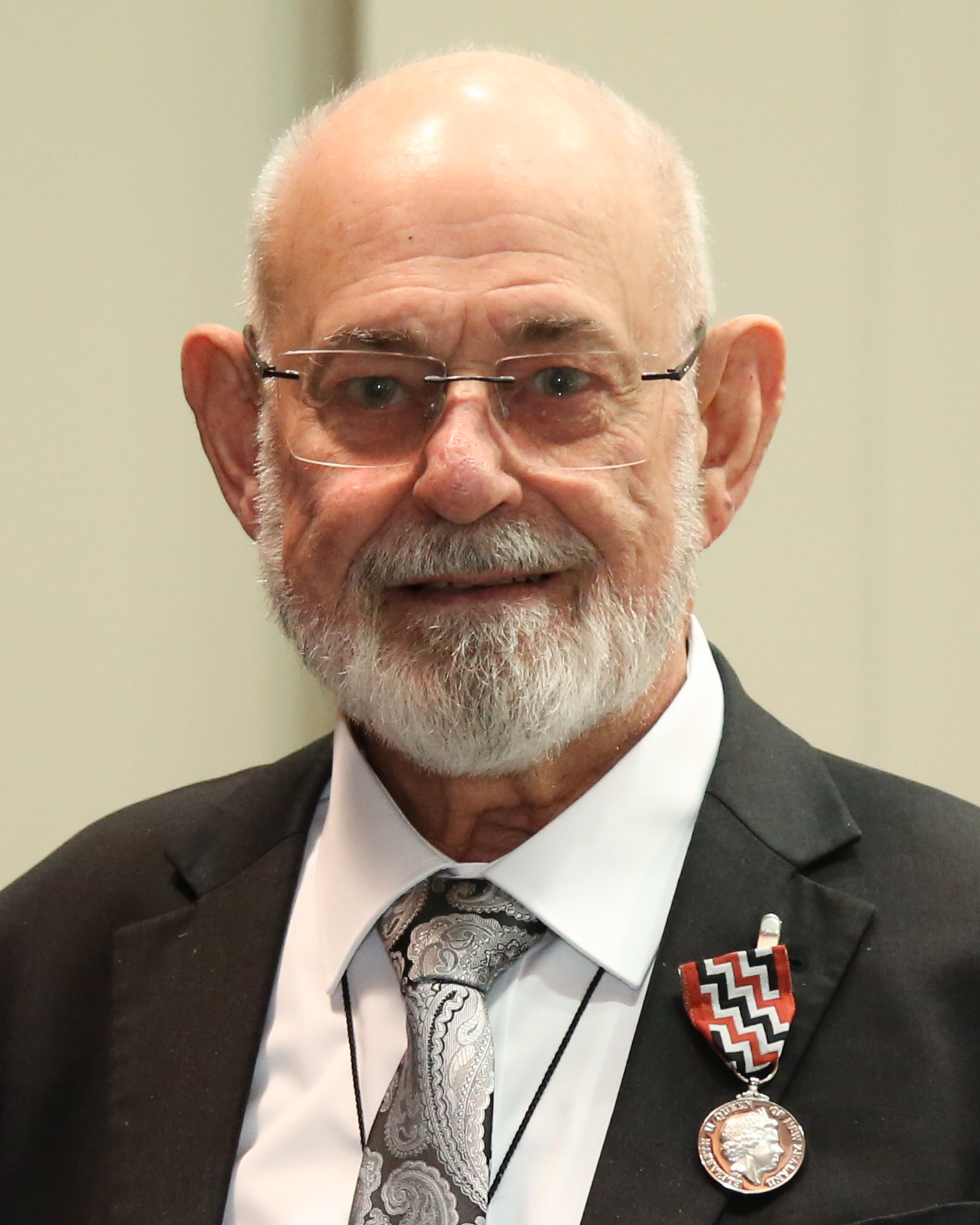
Richard Dunkerton

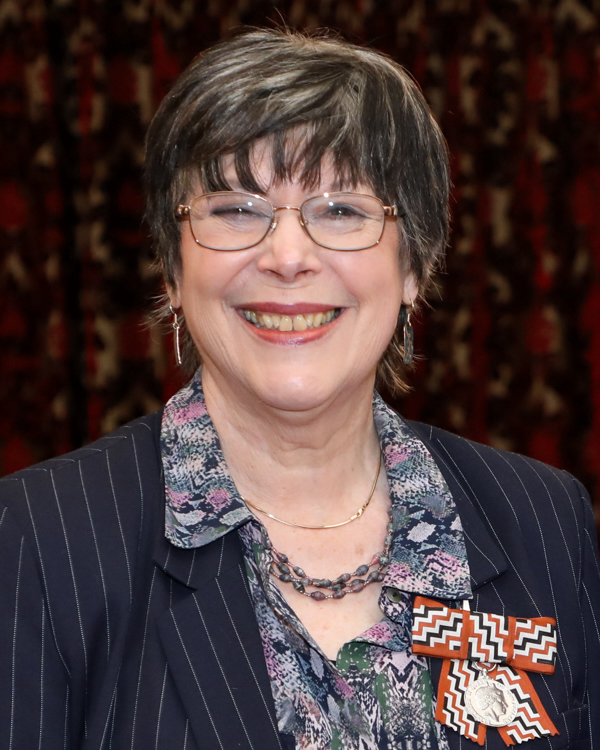
Mary Eastham

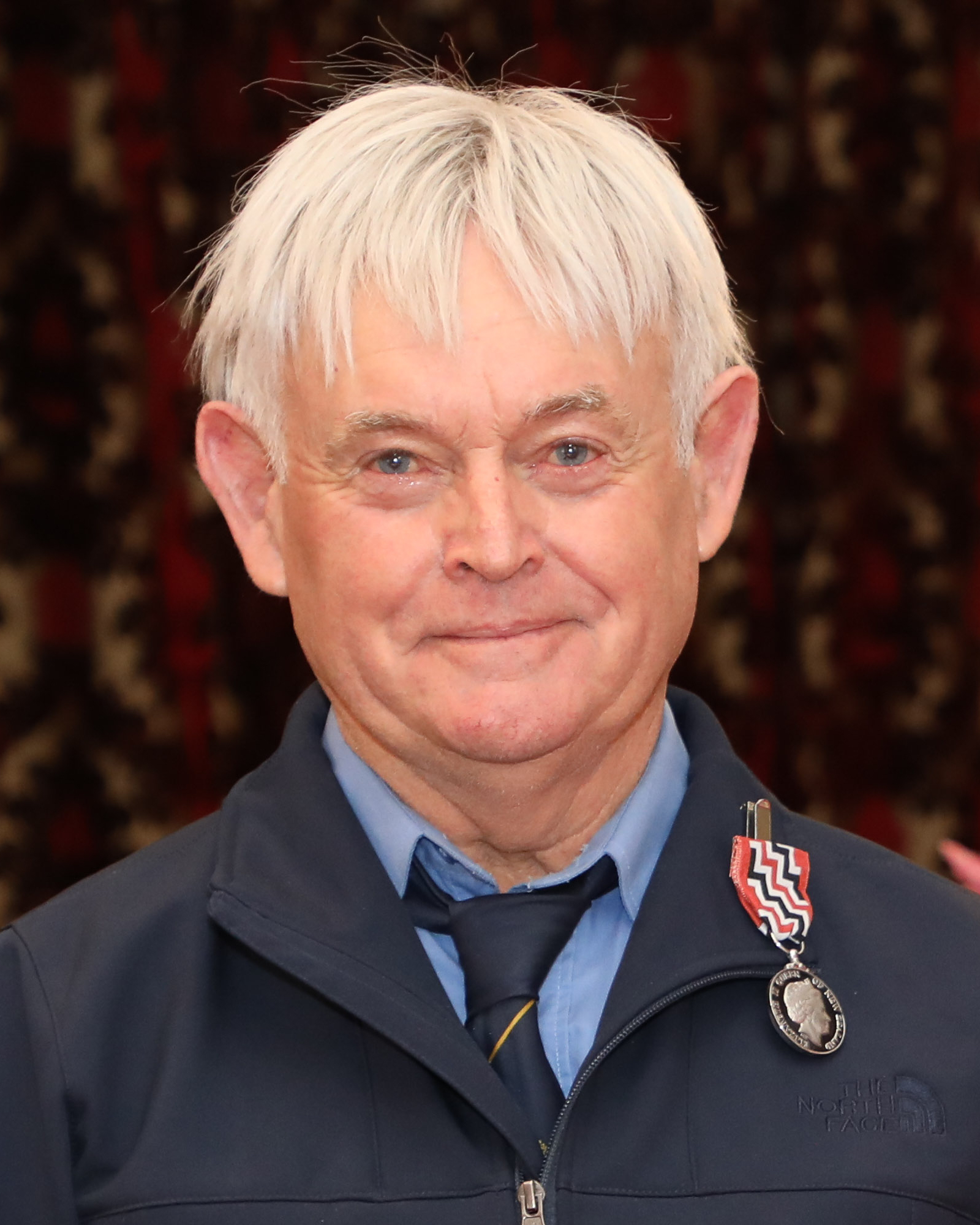
Tony Fortune

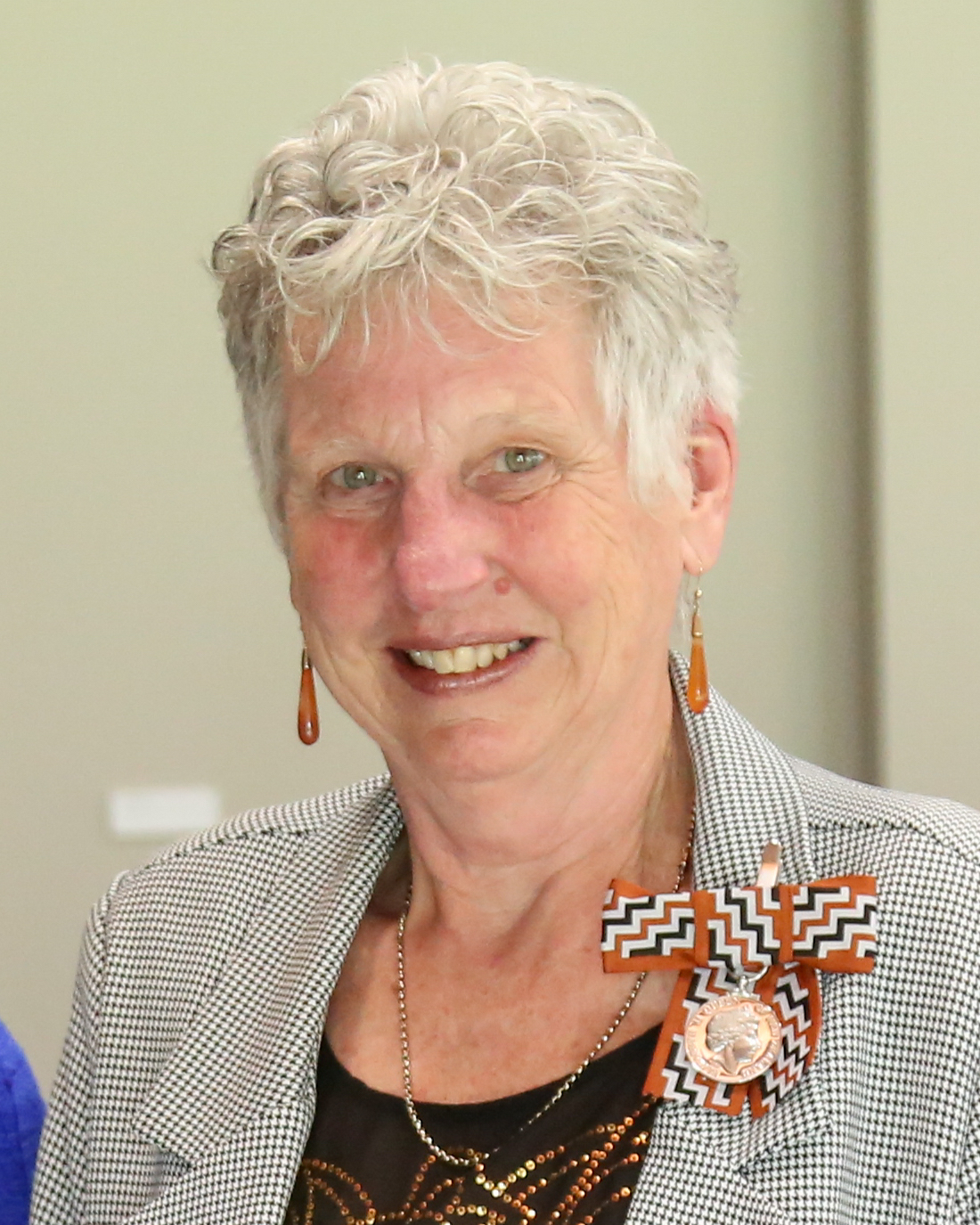
Catriona Foster

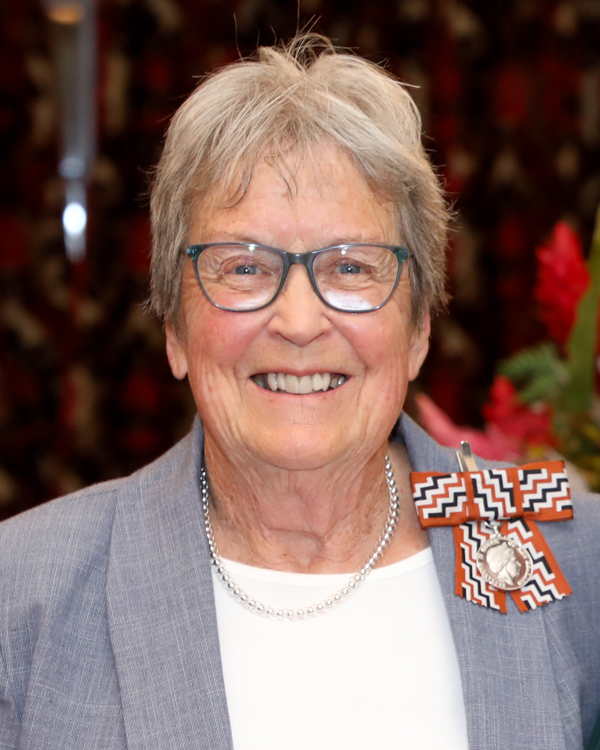
Peggy Frew

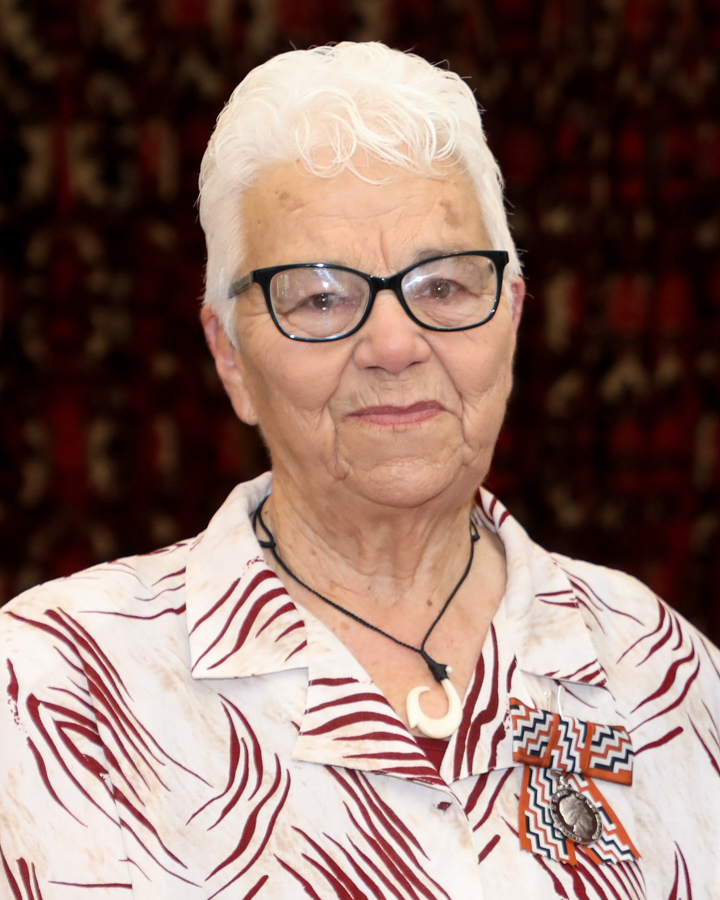
Shirley Gillard

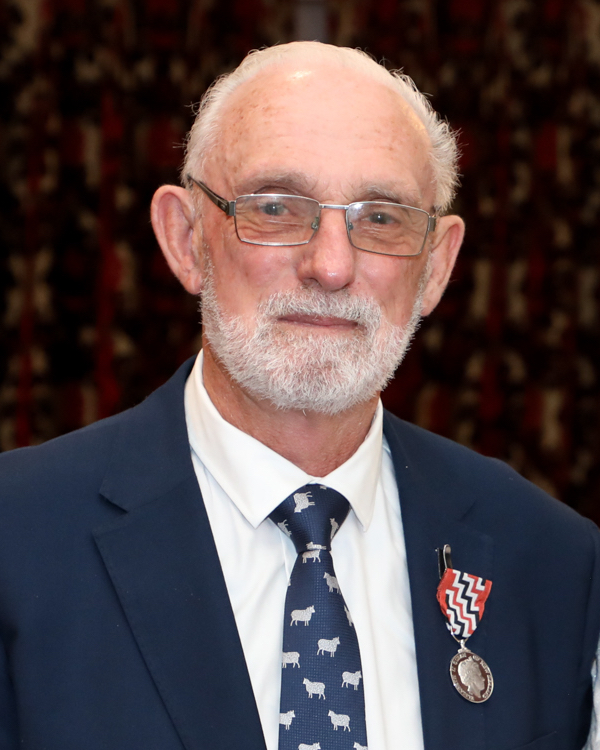
Rod Graham

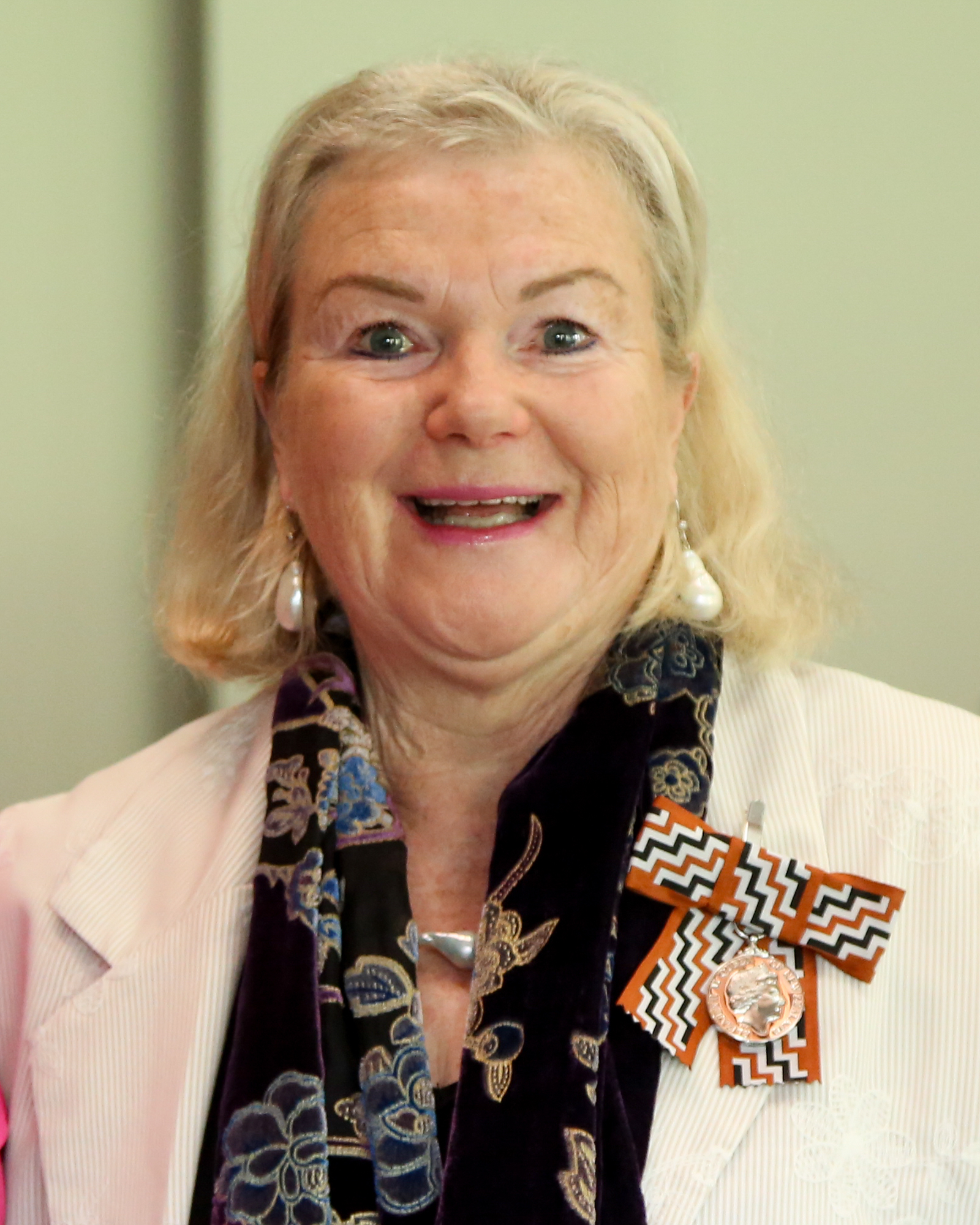
Kate Hargraves

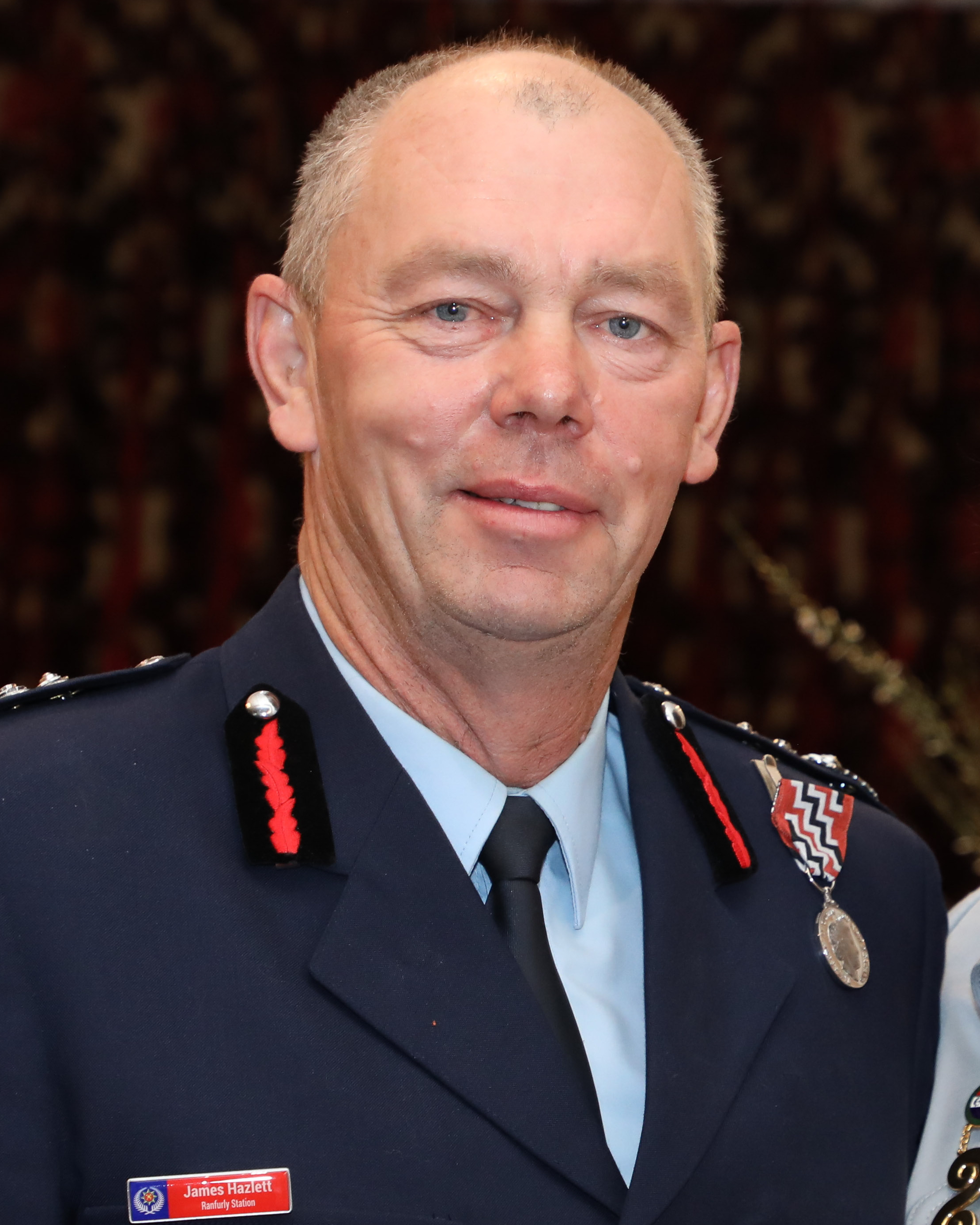
James Hazlett

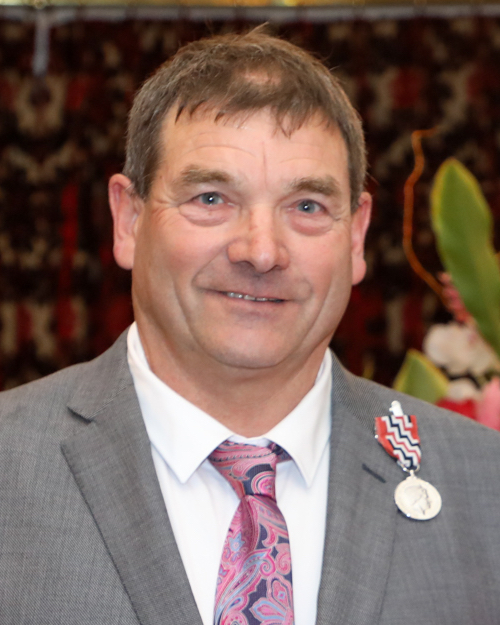
Peter Housiaux

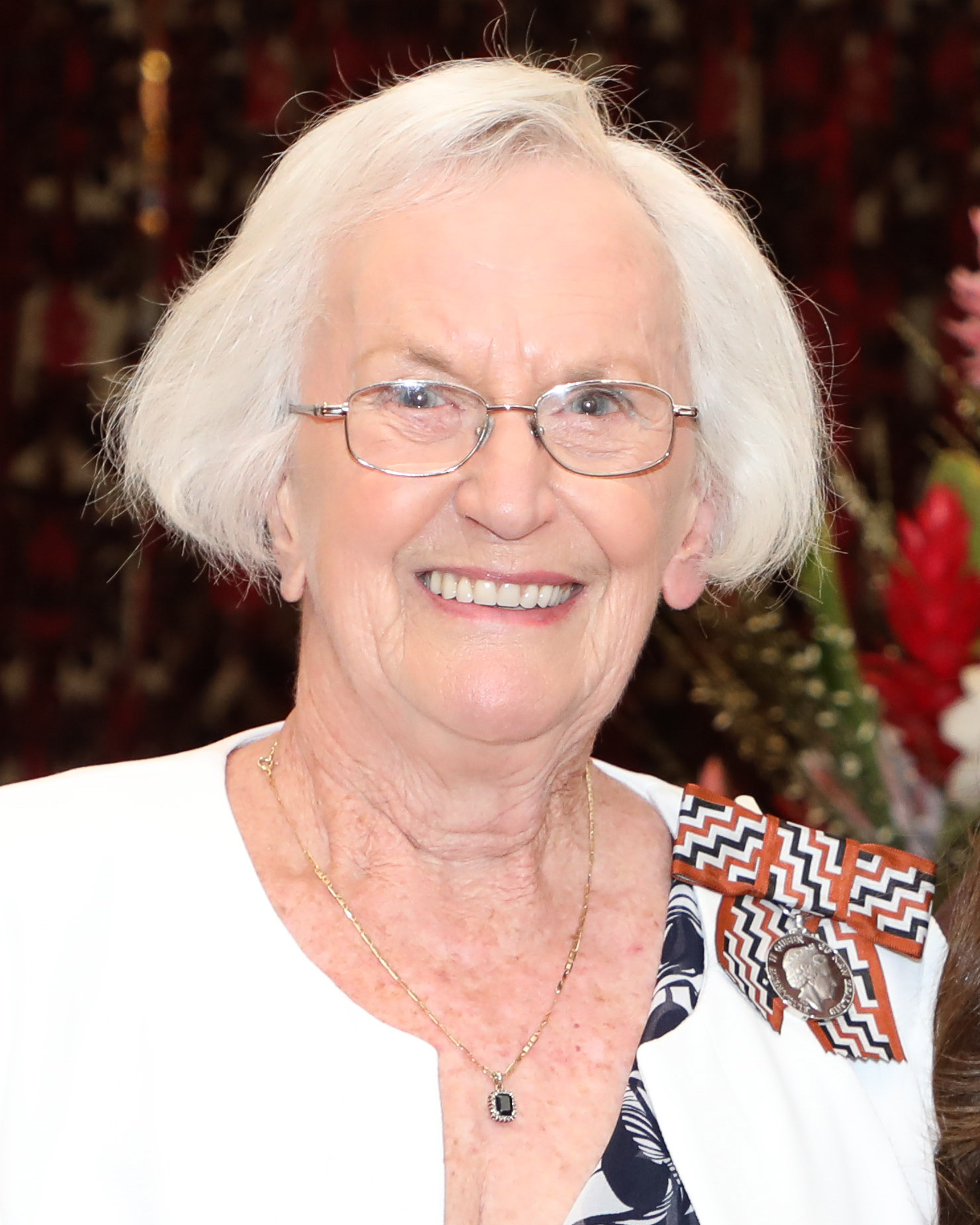
Robin Jackson

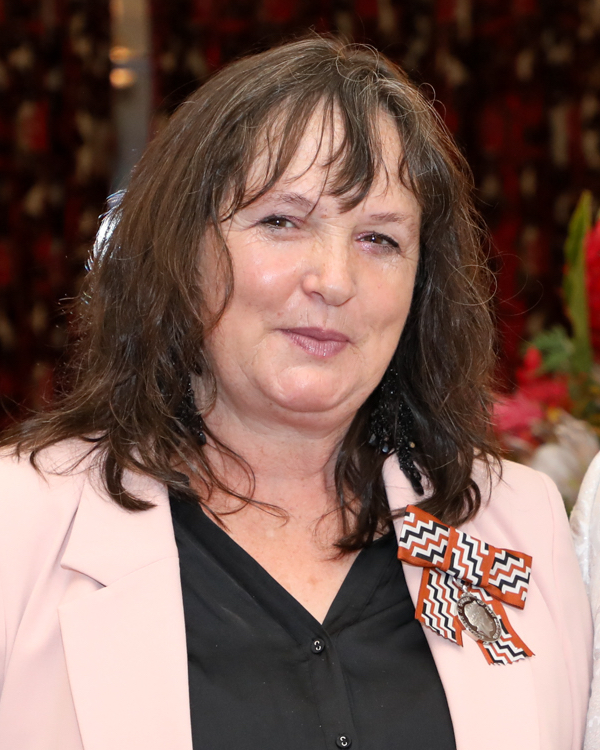
Karen Knudson

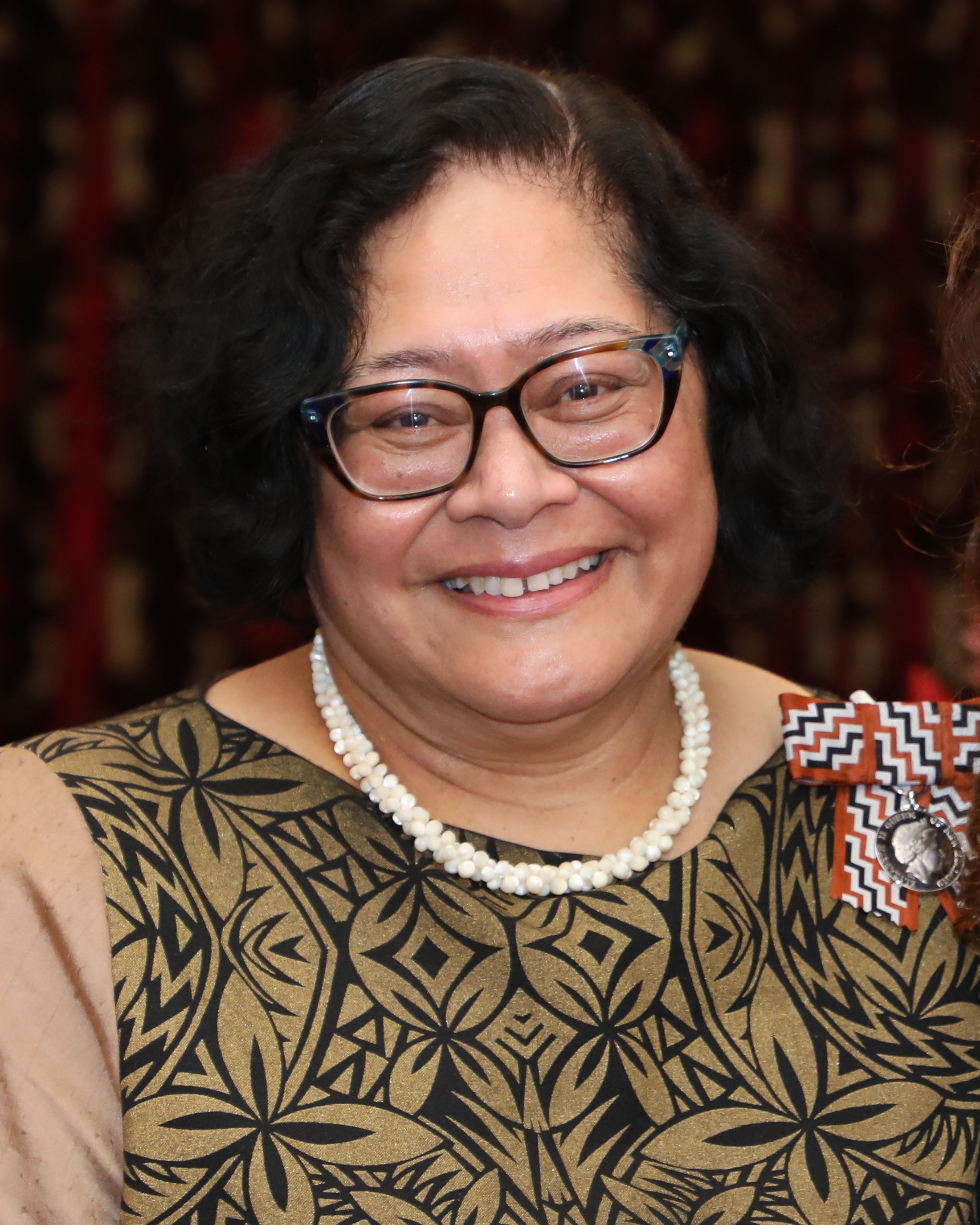
Alofa Lale

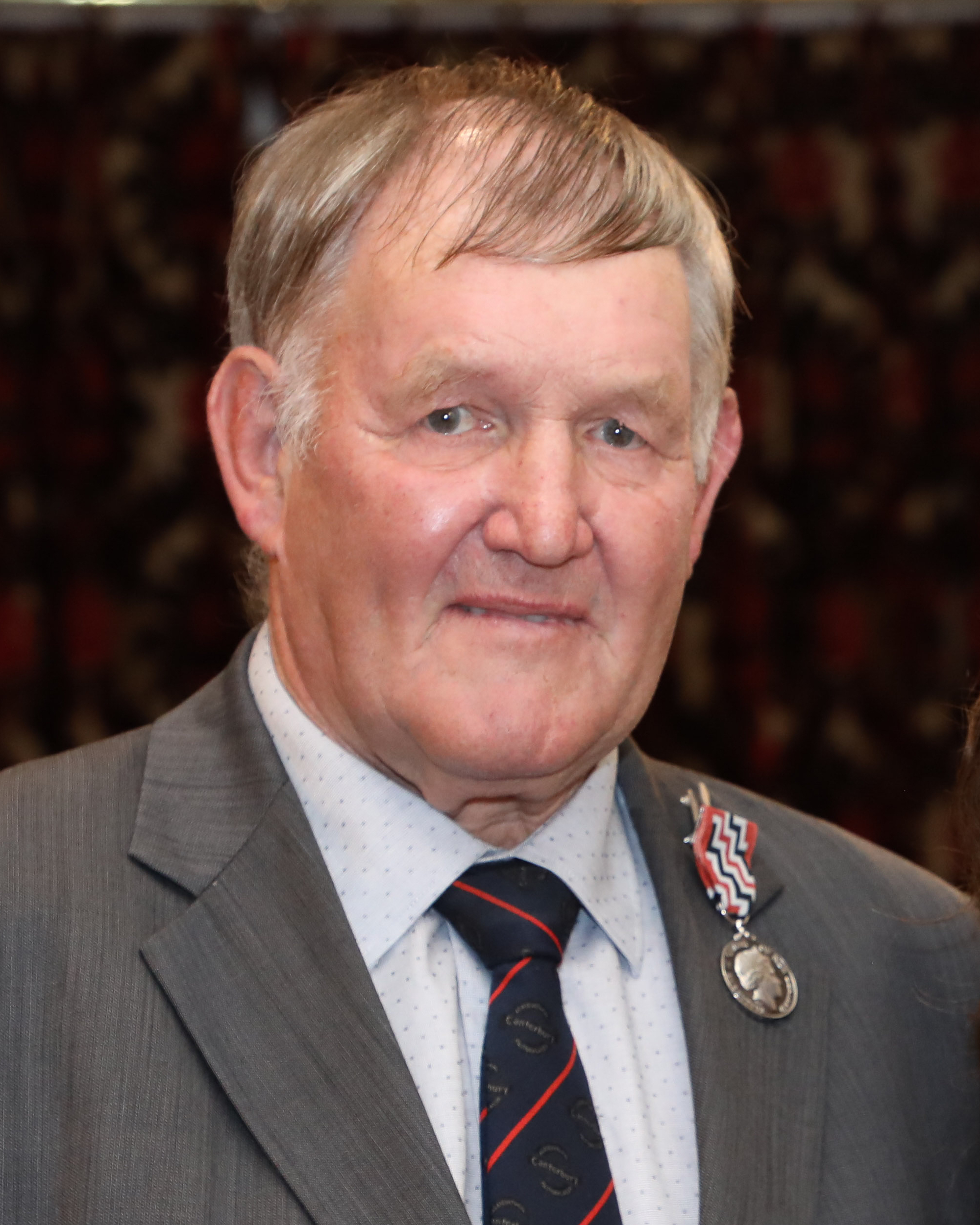
Richard Lemon

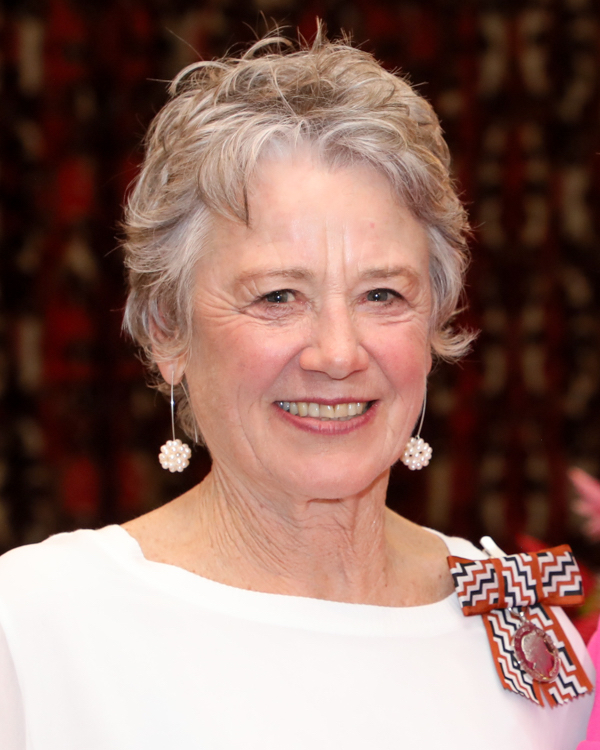
Bernie Lepper

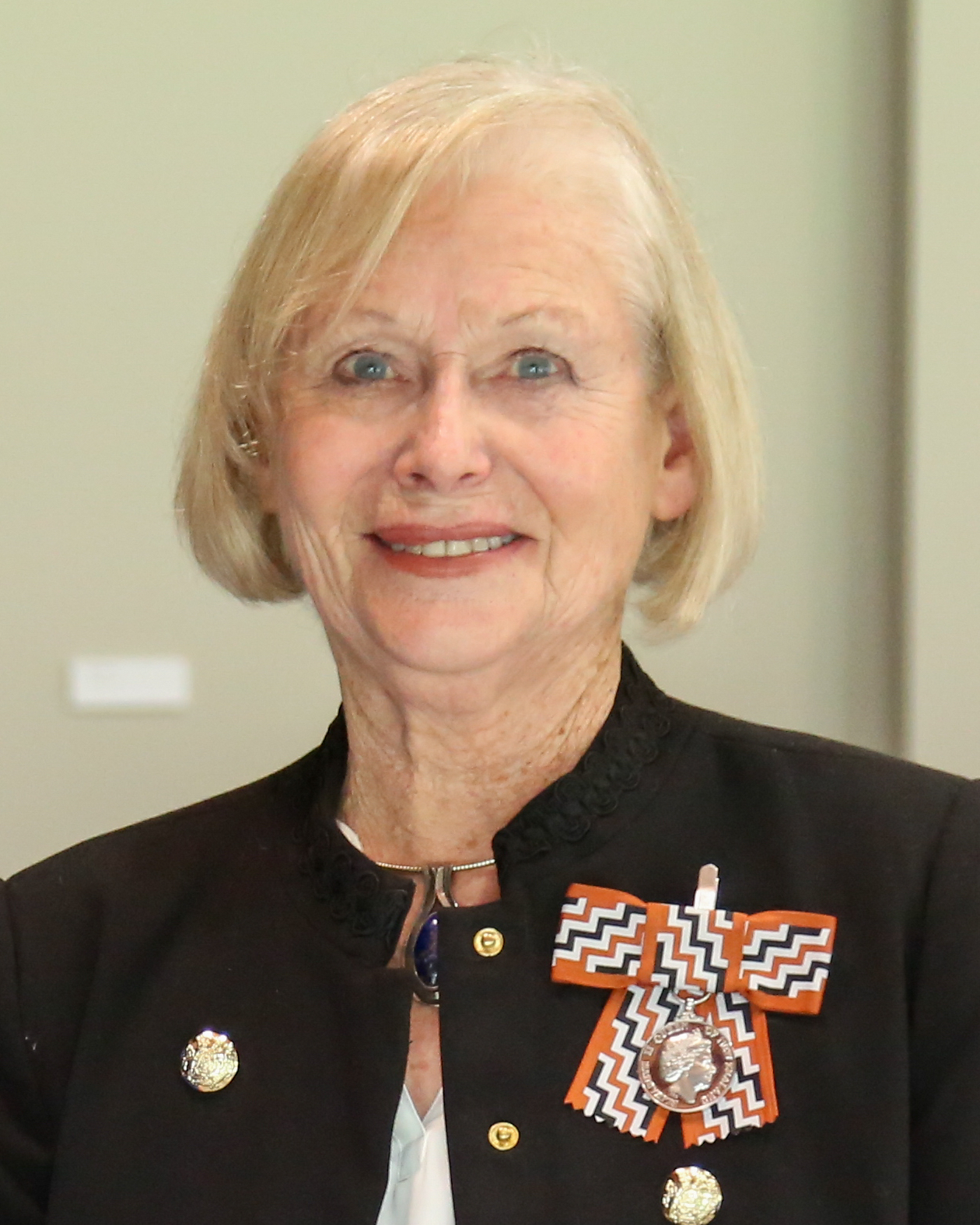
Ngaio Lewis

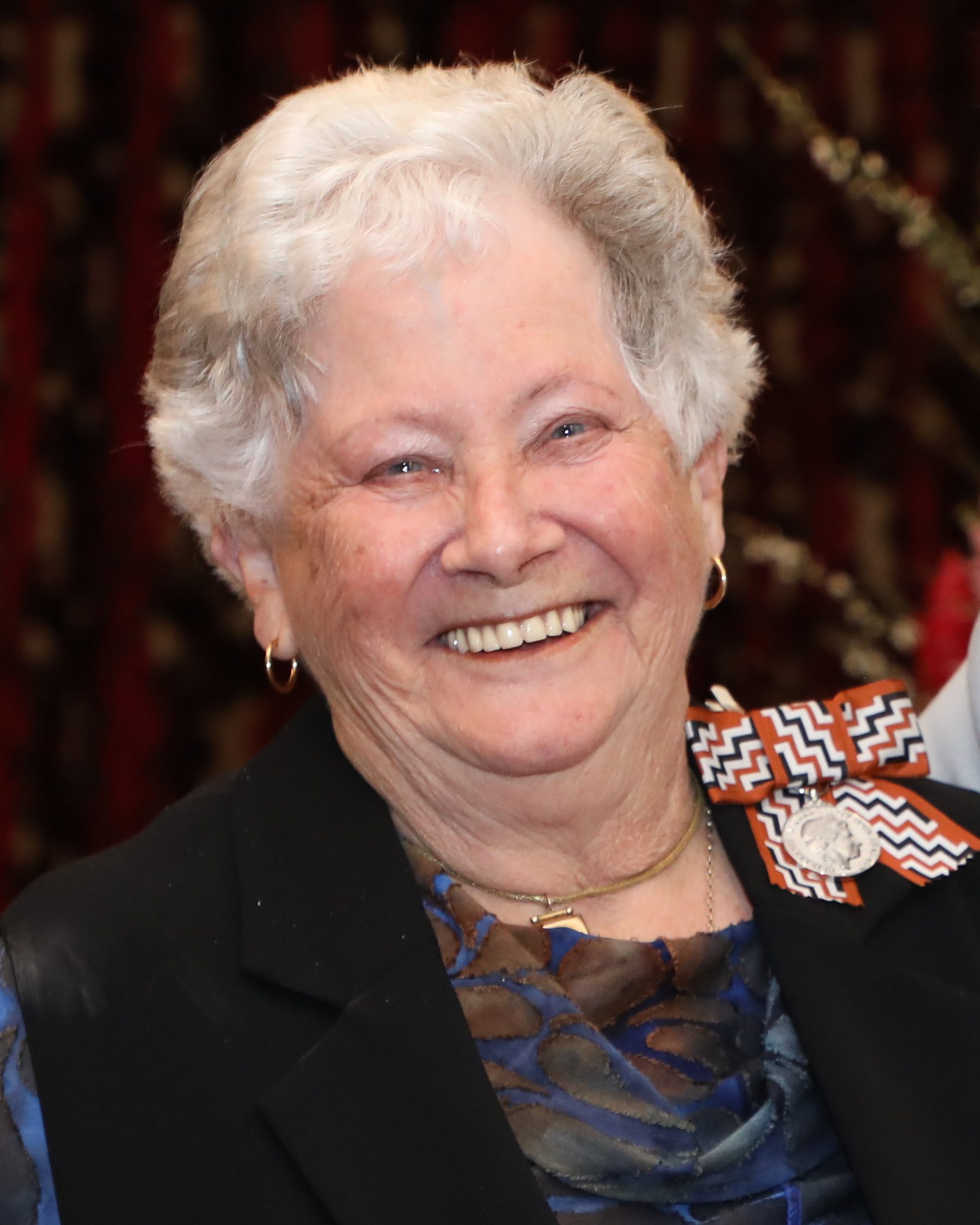
Diane Martin

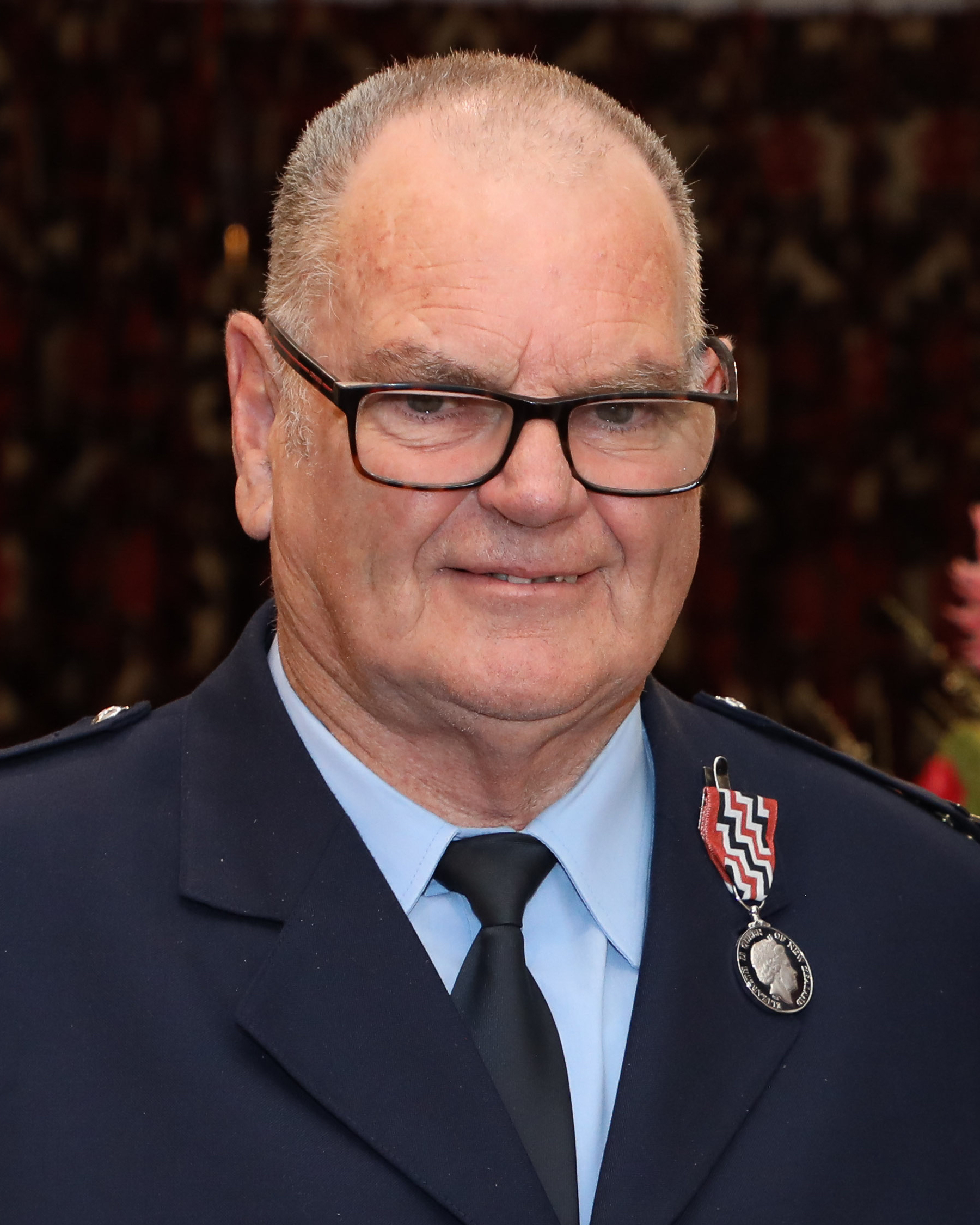
Geoff Mayall

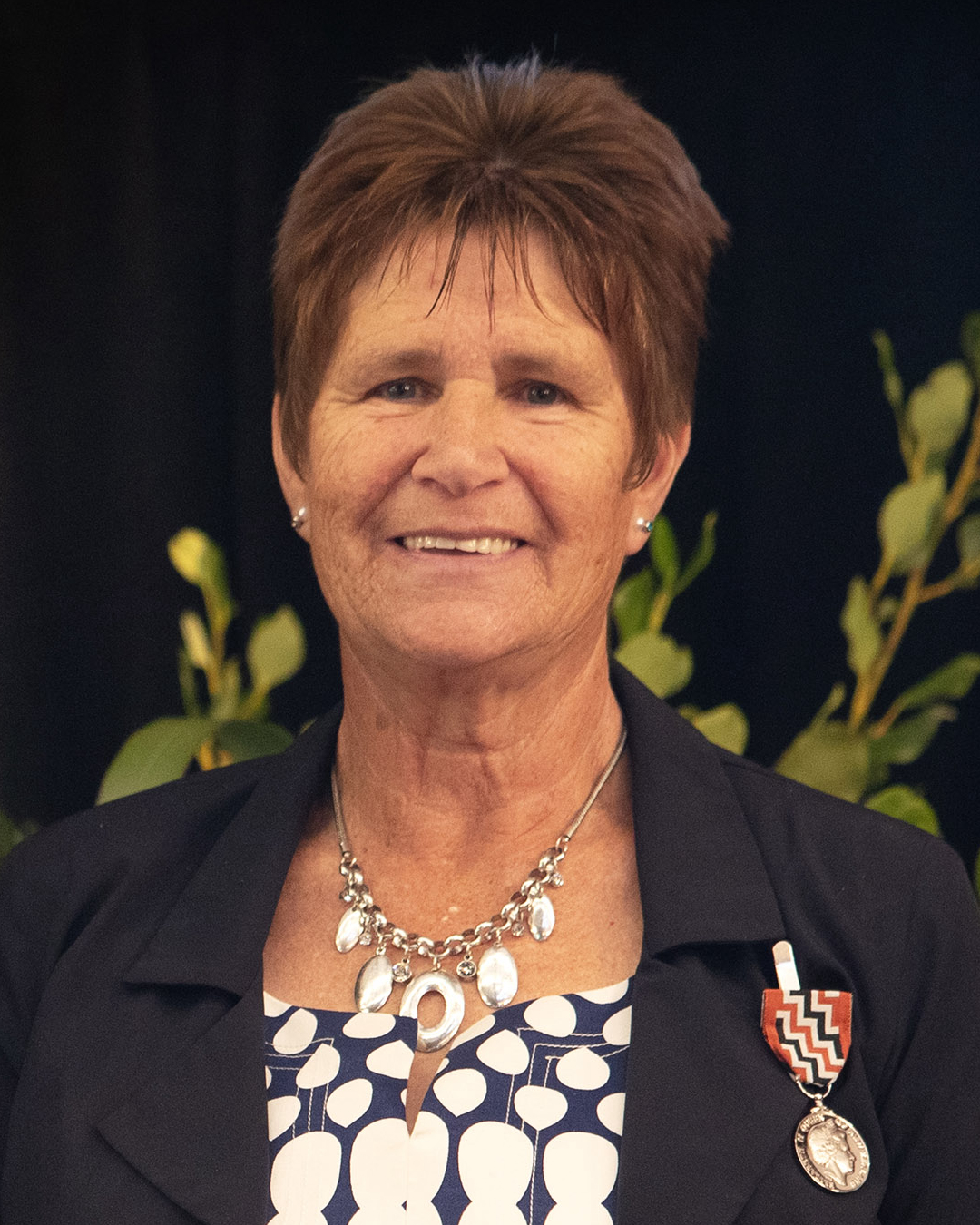
Karen McClintock

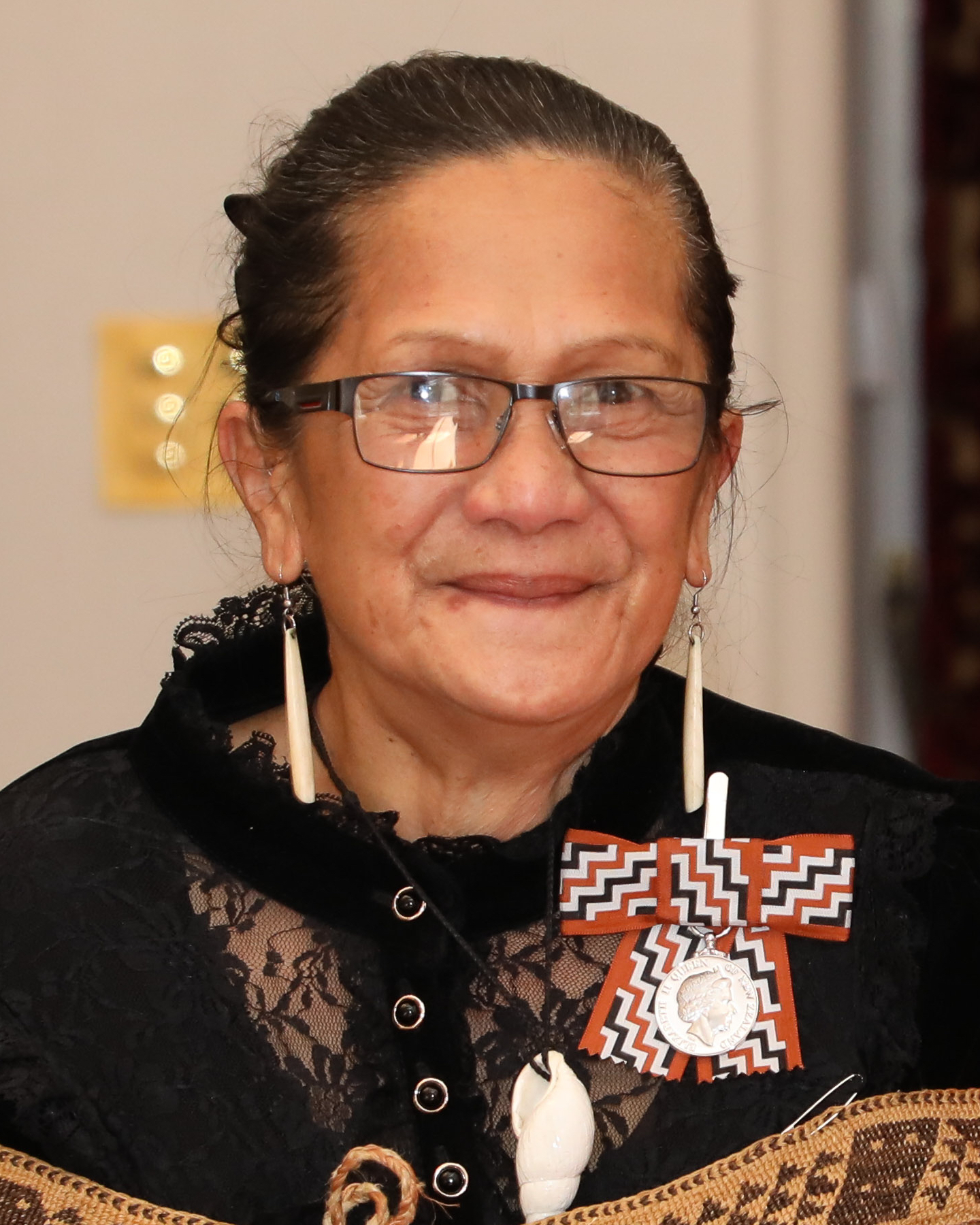
Miraka Norgate

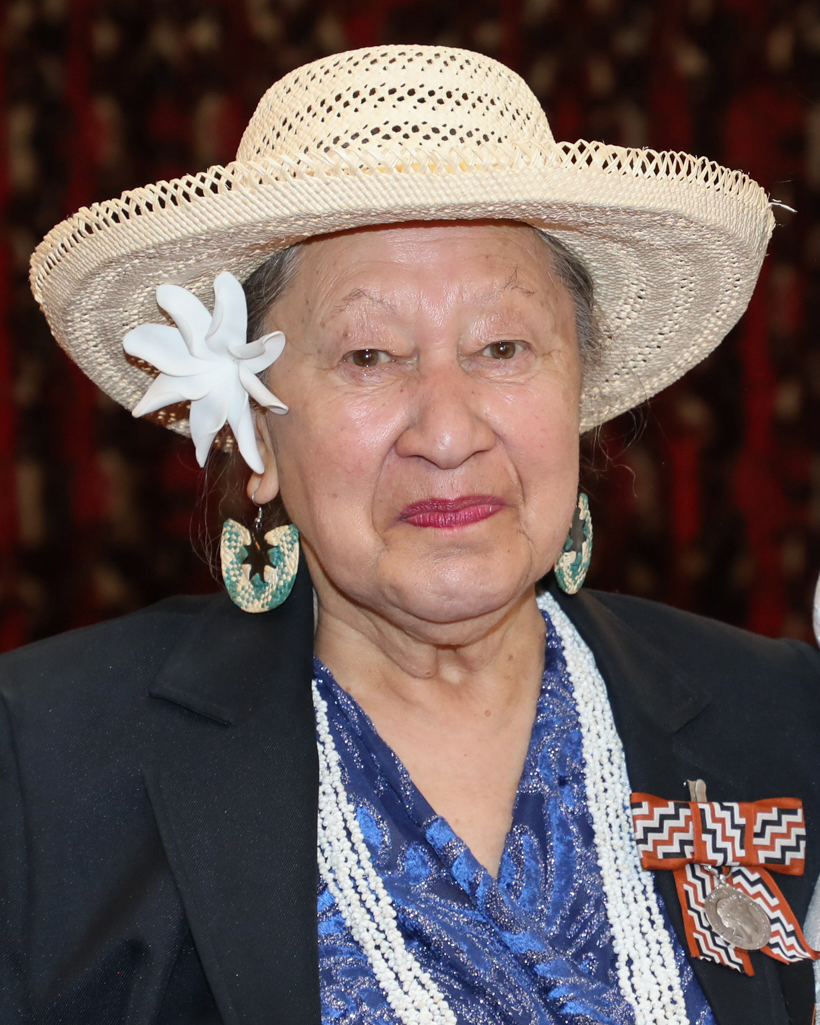
Teremoana Maua‑Hodges

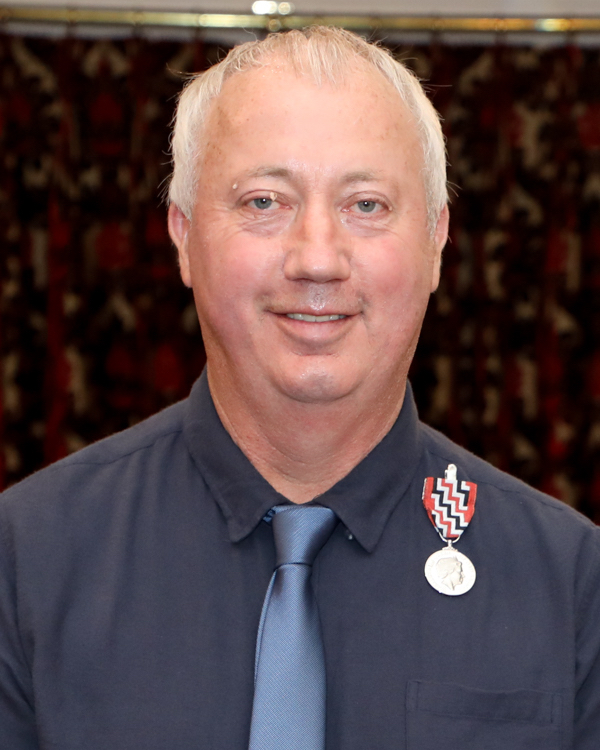
Antony Pettinger

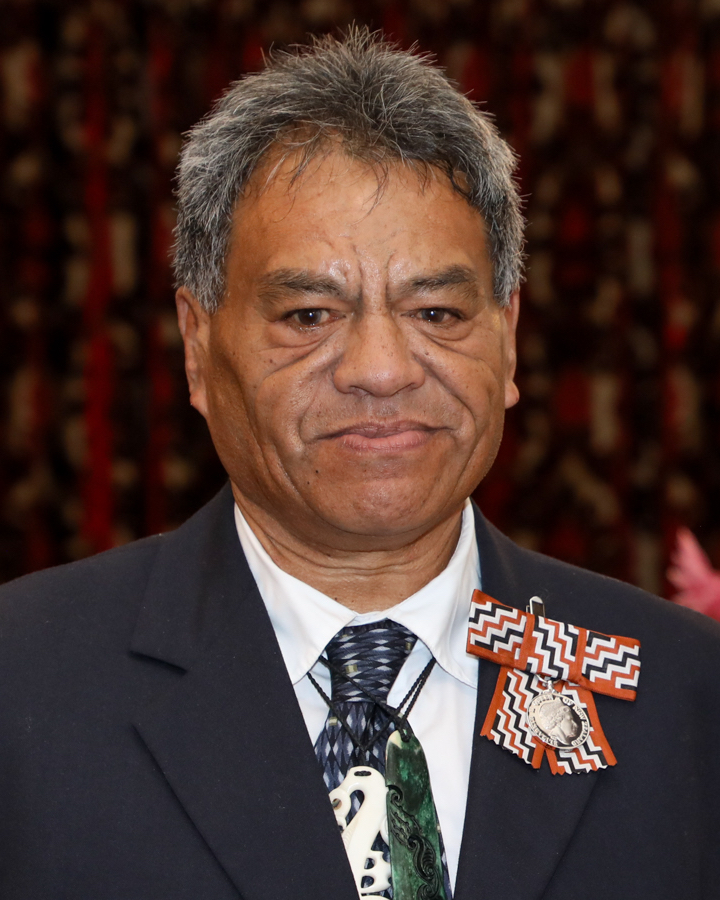
Kane Rangitonga

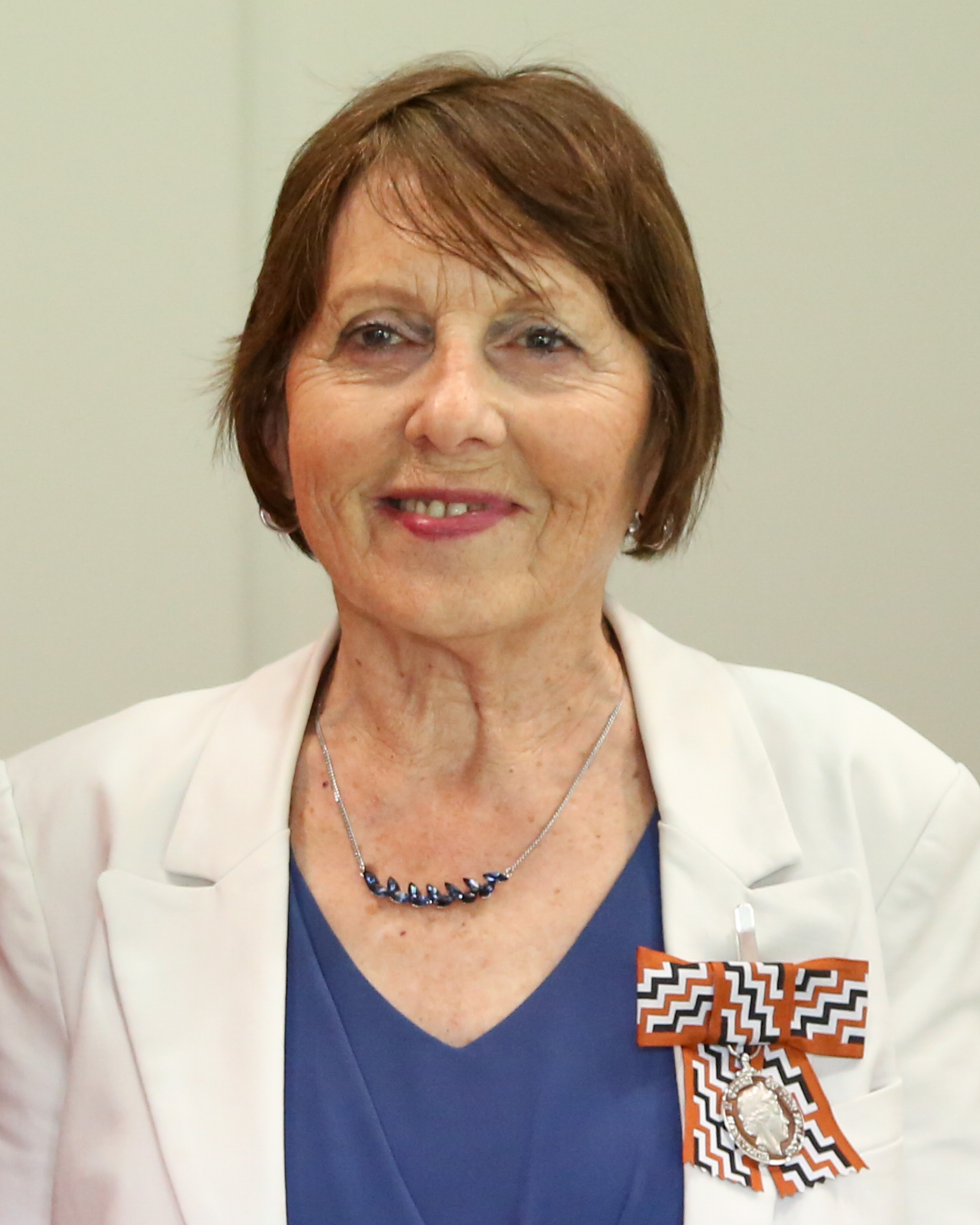
Sue Reardon

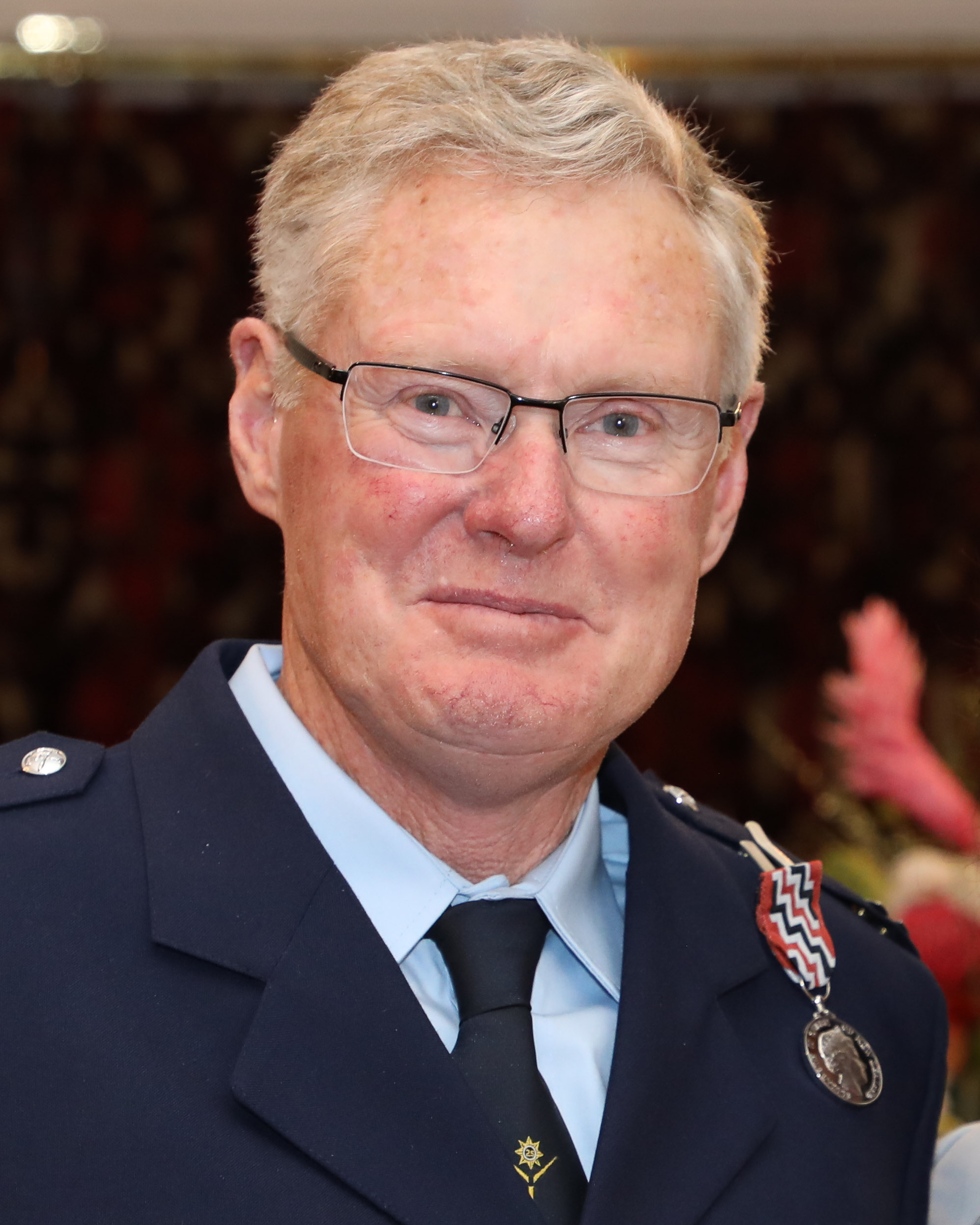
Neil Robbie

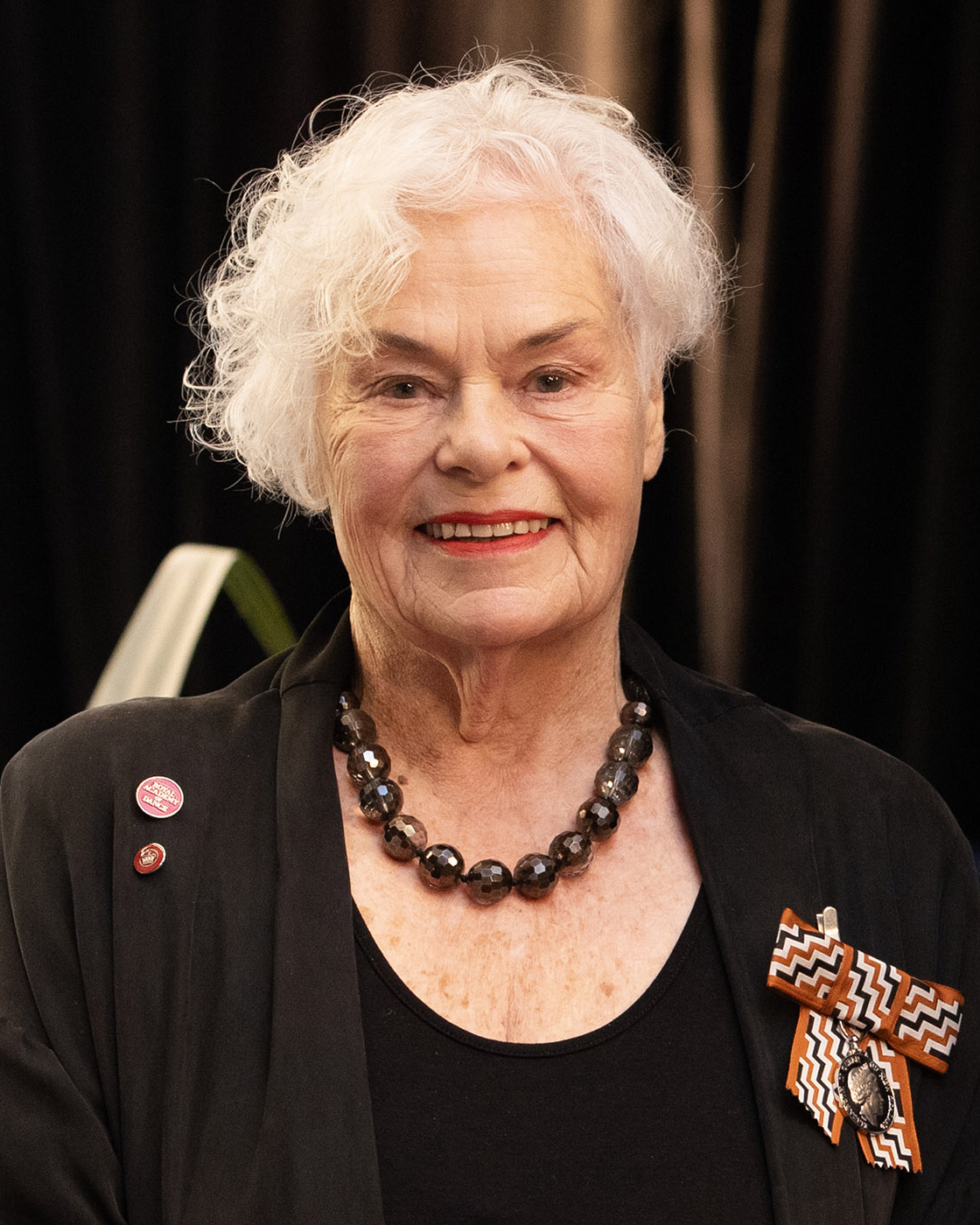
Glenys Scandrett

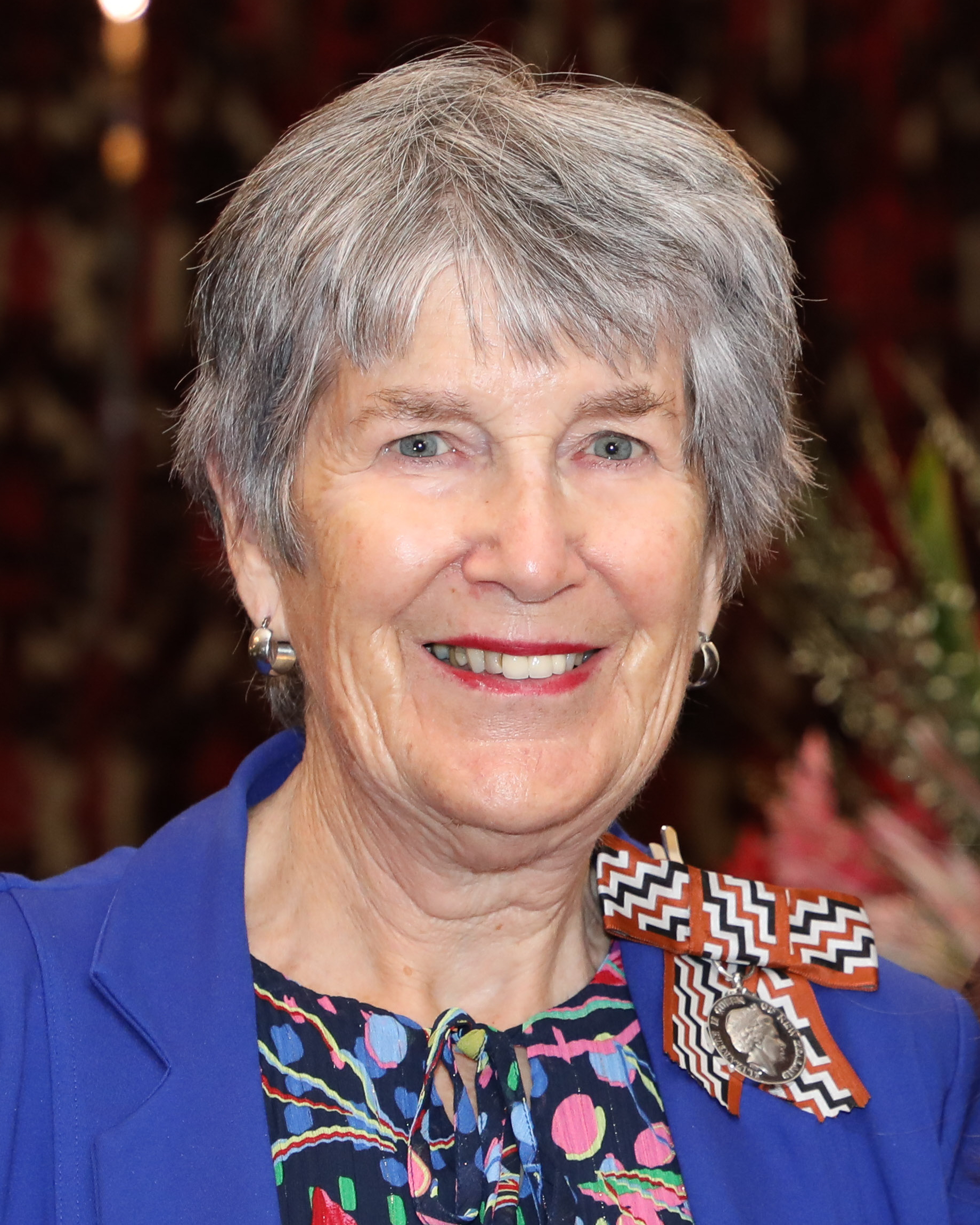
Kirsty Sharpe

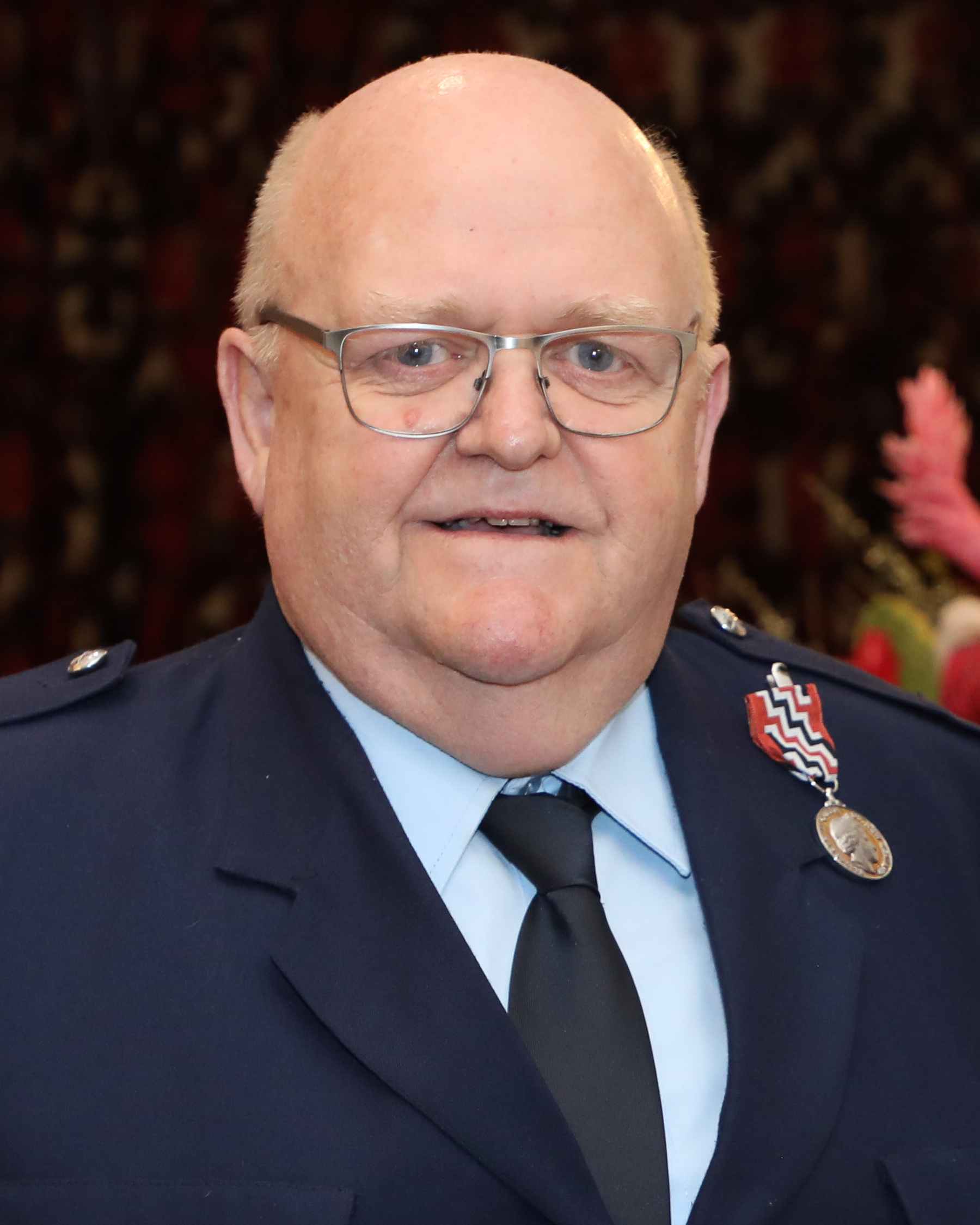
Stephen Shaw

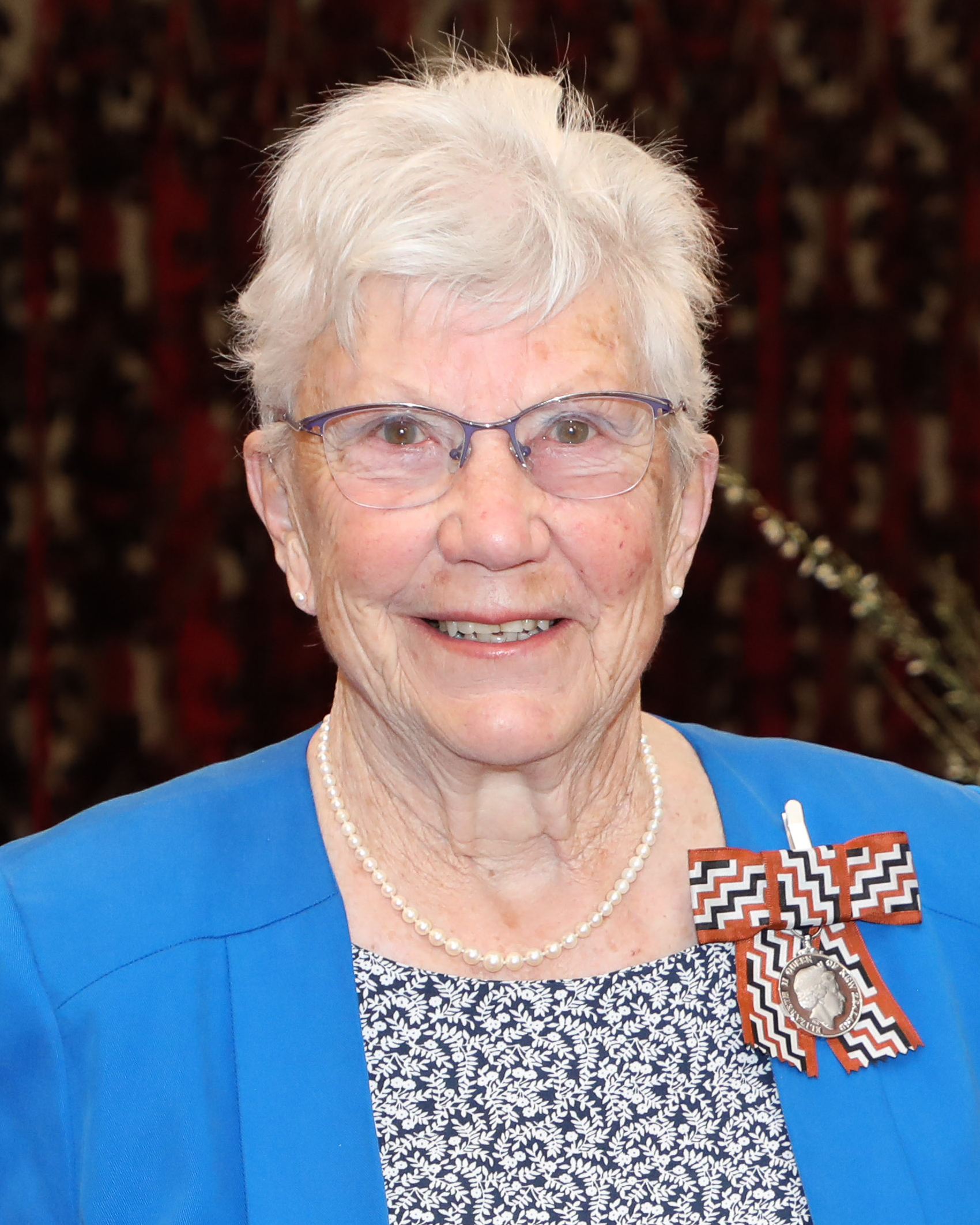
Penny Sinnamon

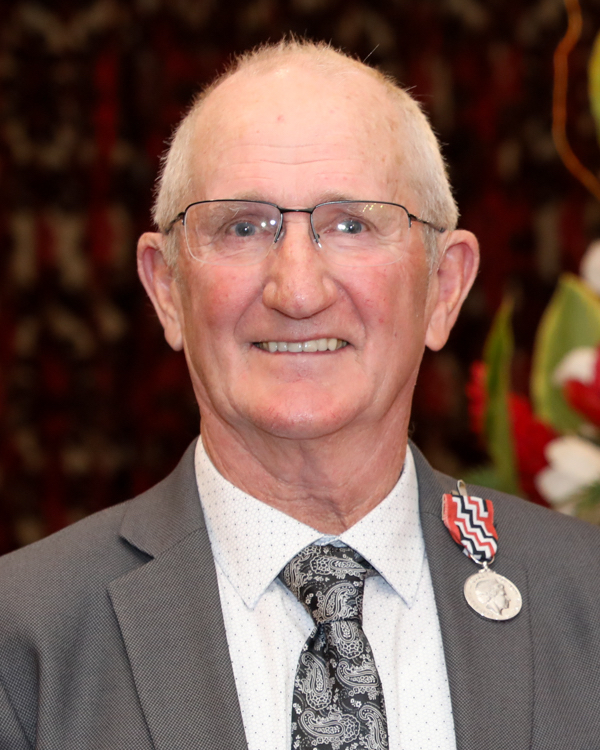
Ron Smith

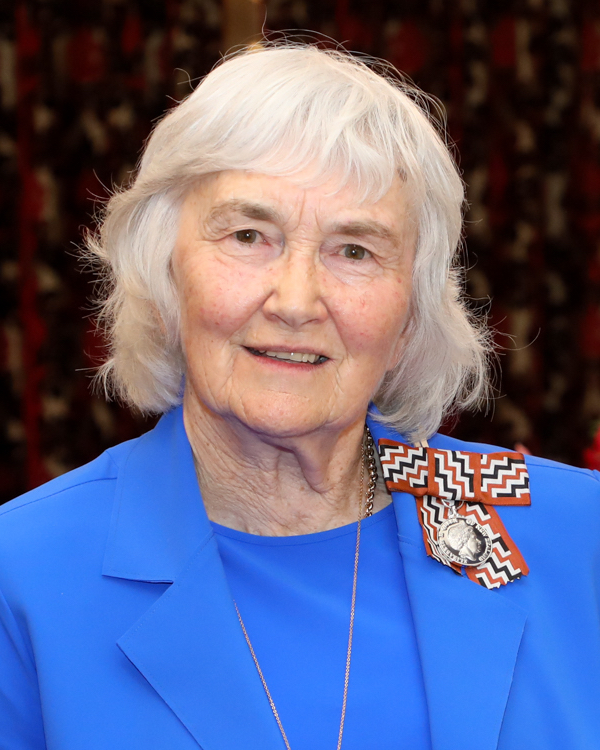
Sylvia Smith

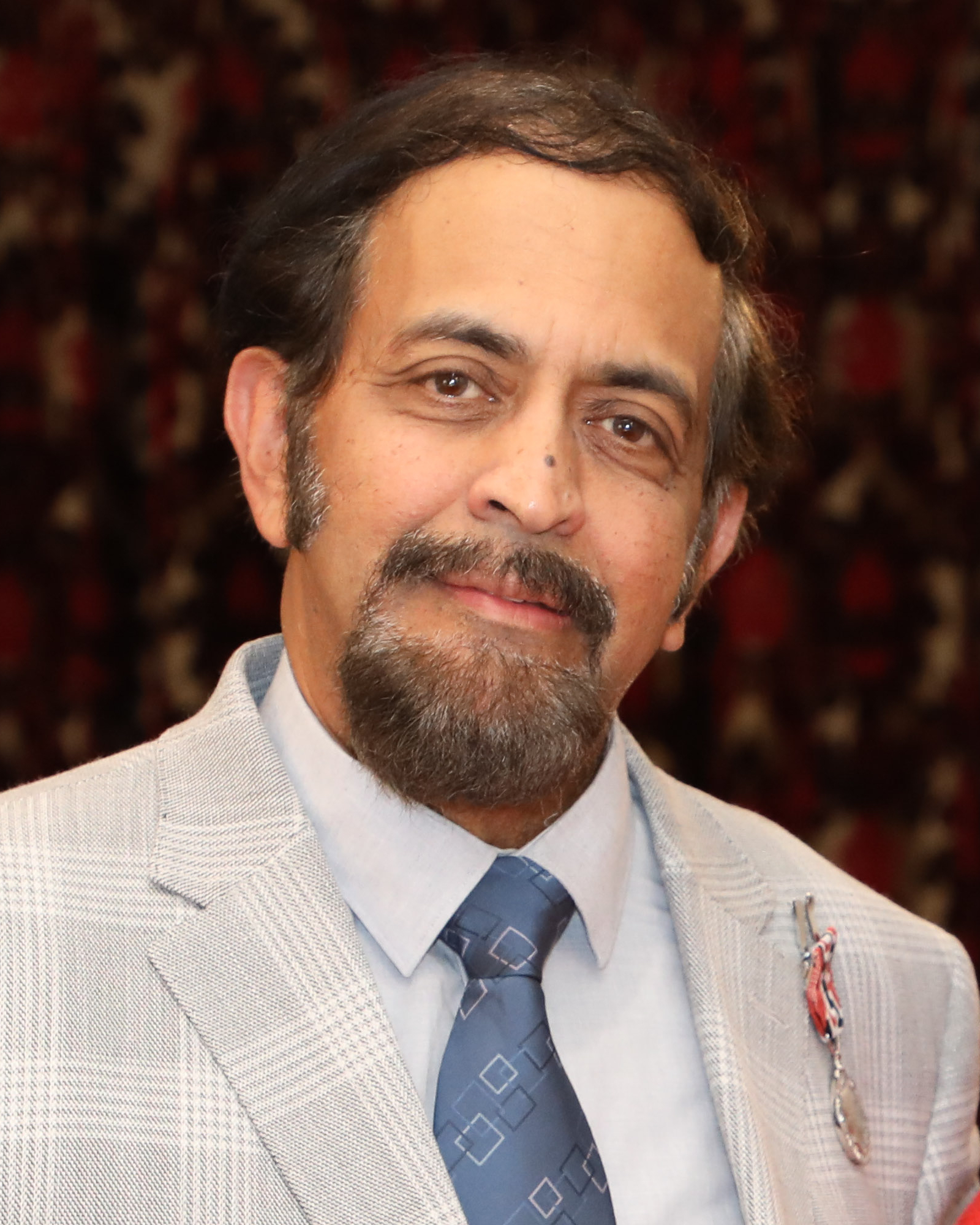
Ram SriRamaratnam

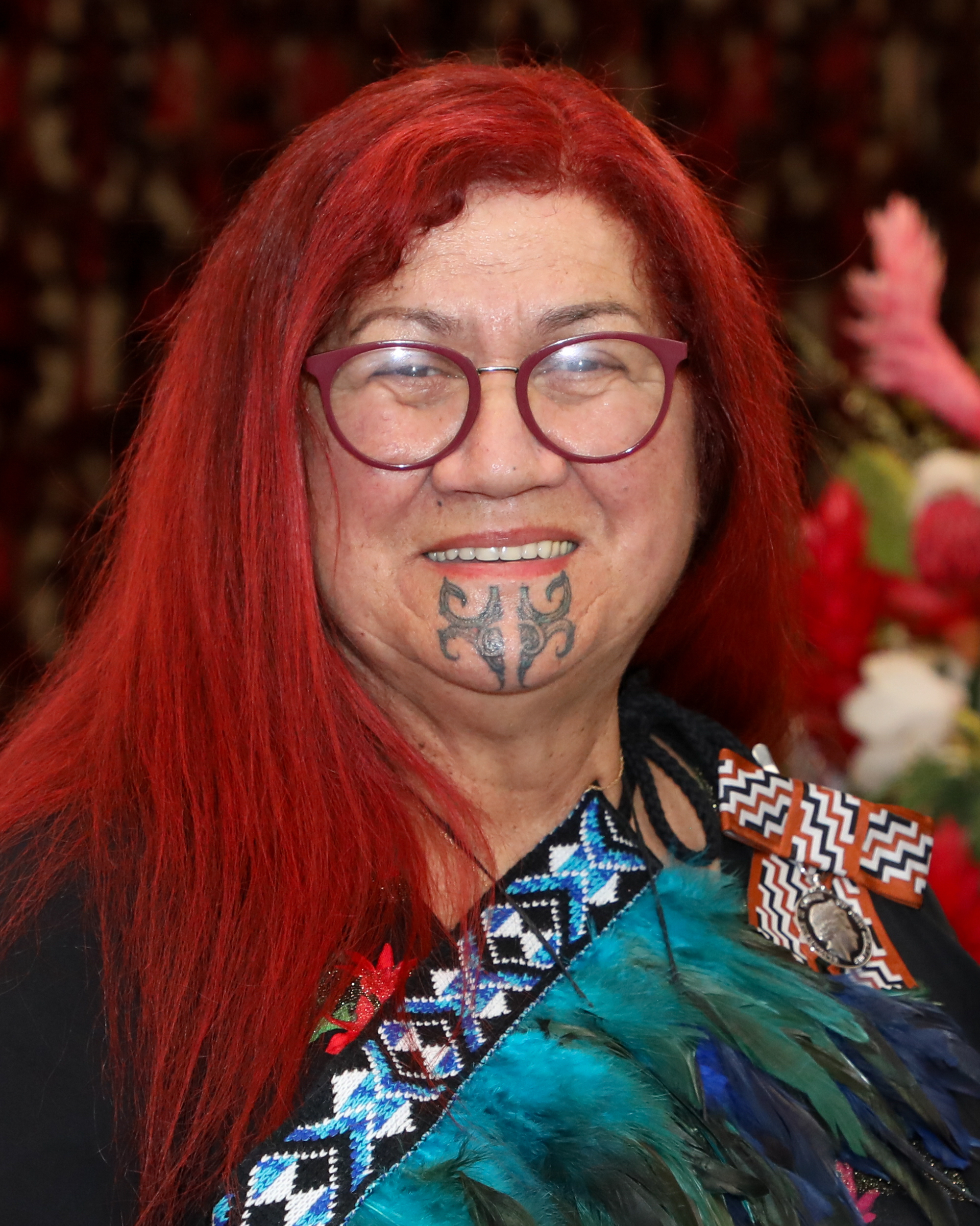
Marcia Te Au‑Thomson

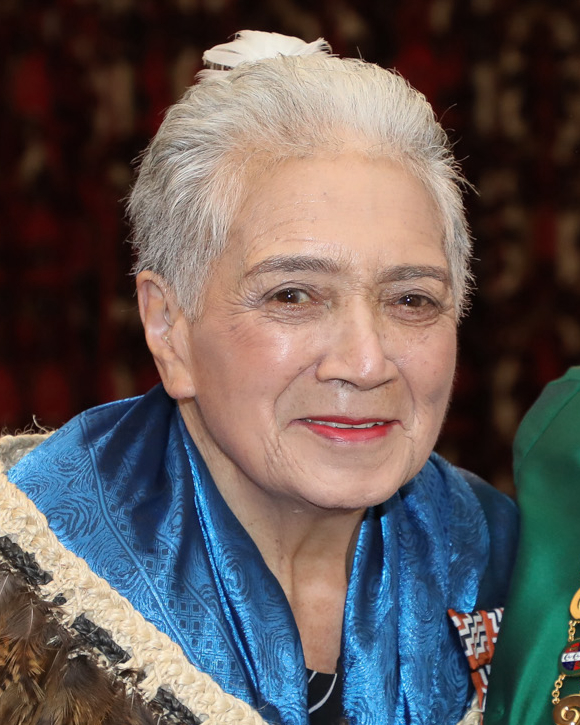
Raana Tuuta

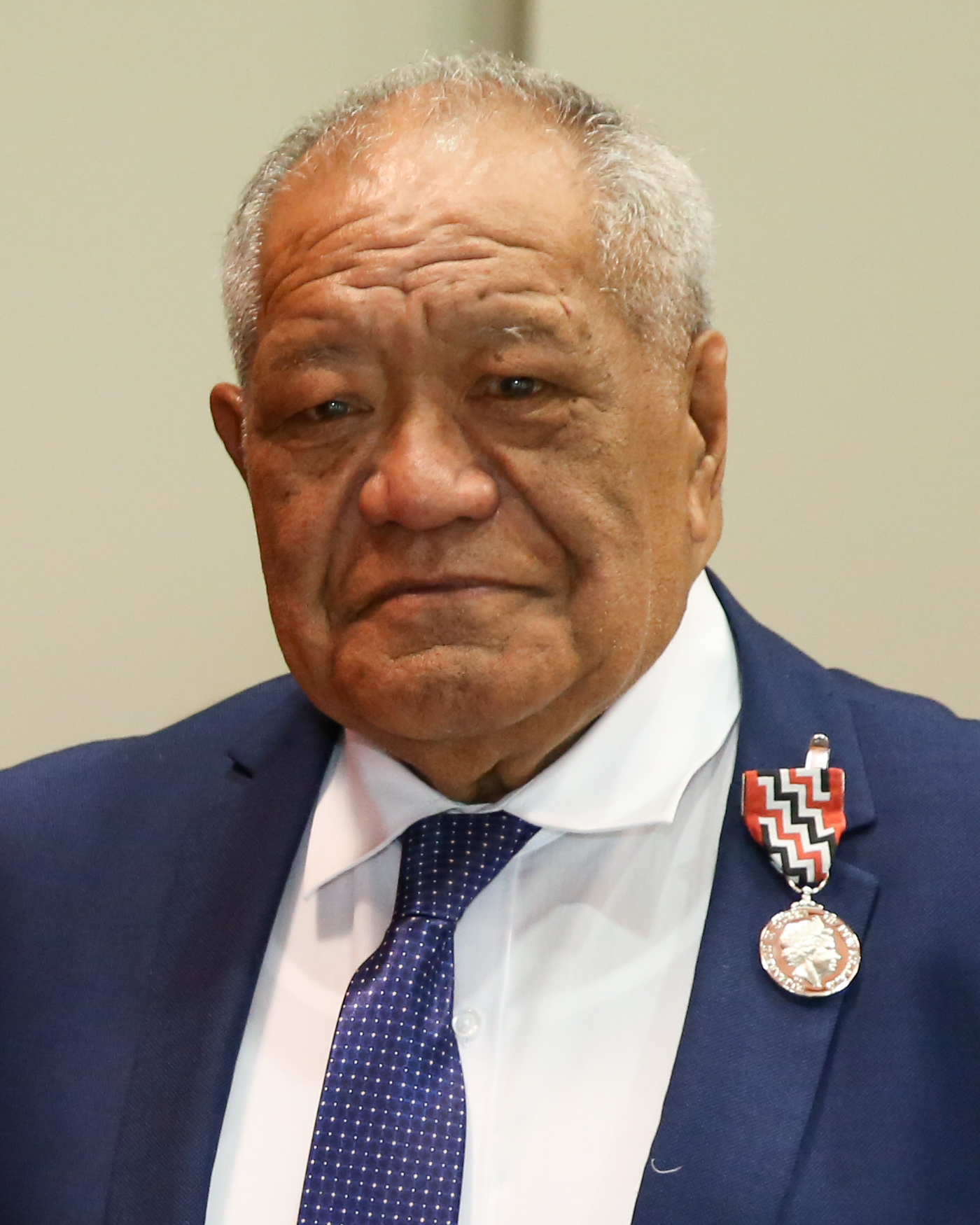
Putiani Upoko

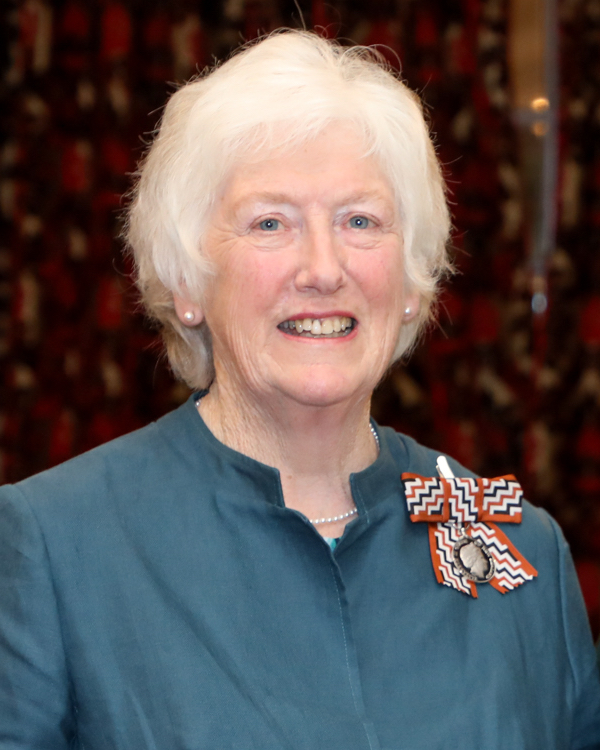
Robyn van Reenen

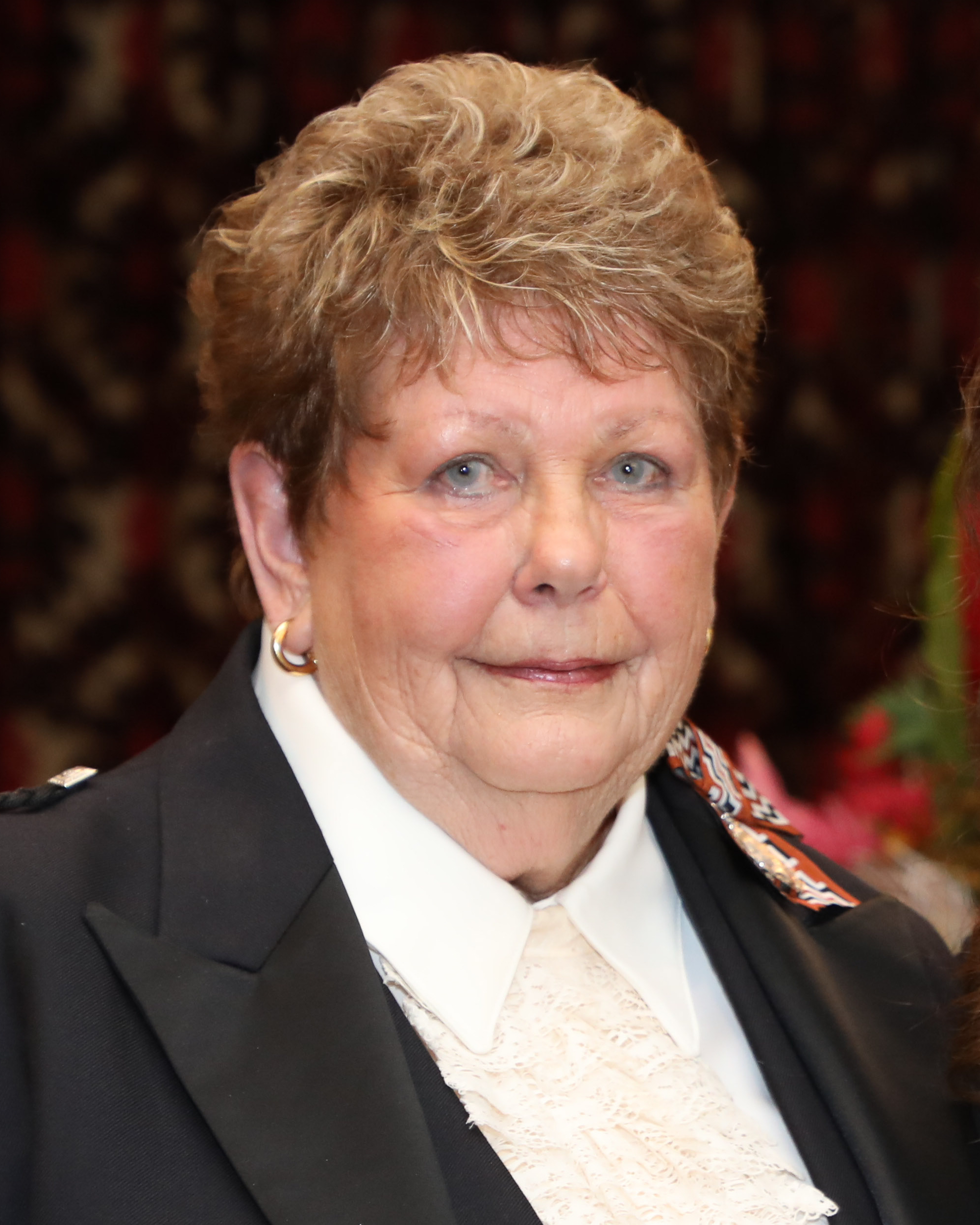
Jillian Vincent

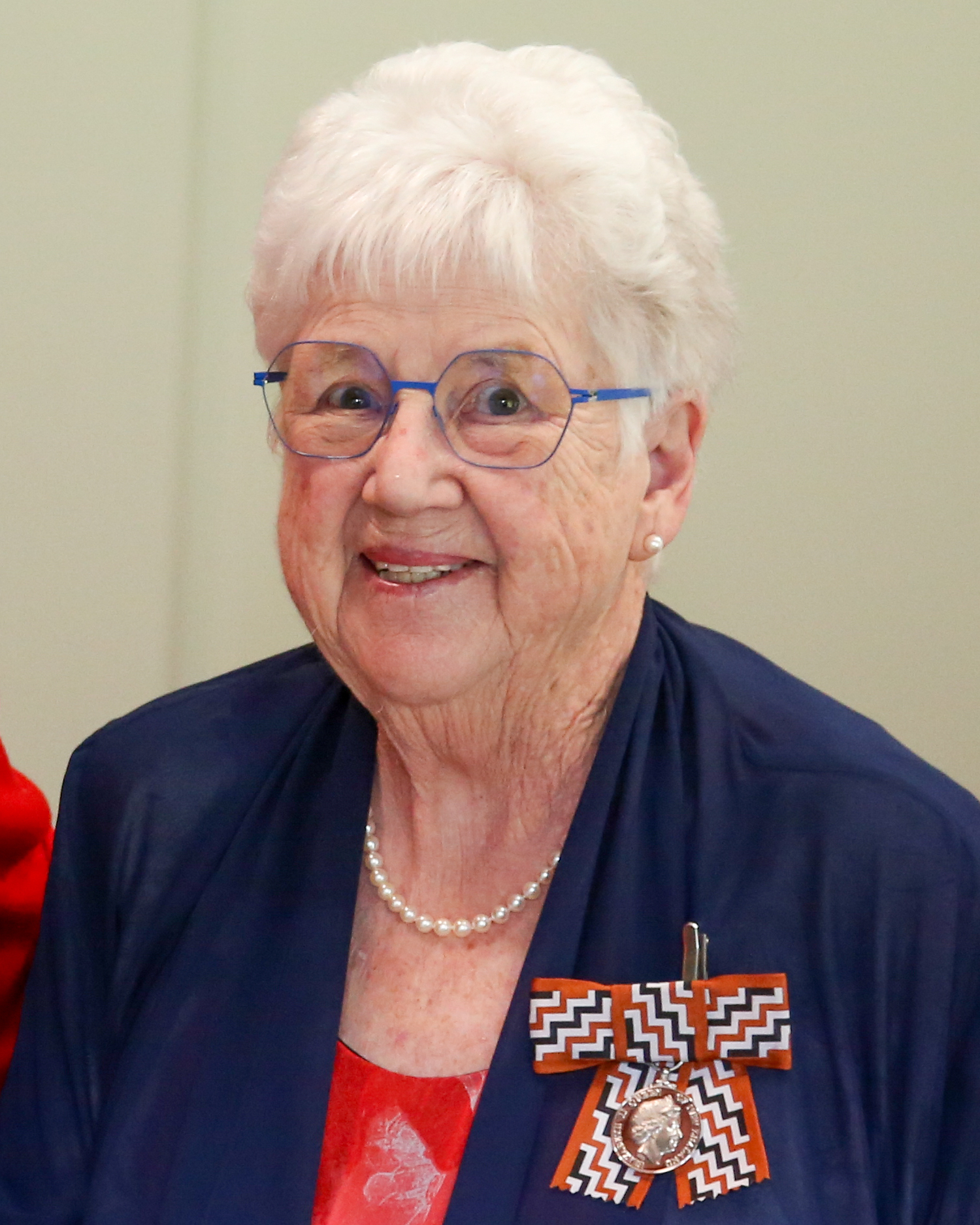
Pat Wyatt

== New Zealand Distinguished Service Decoration (DSD) ==
- Group Captain Glenn Gowthorpe – of Waimauku. For services to the New Zealand Defence Force.
- Squadron Leader George Samuel McInnes – of Paraparaumu. For services to the New Zealand Defence Force.
- Lieutenant Colonel Vanessa Maria Ropitini – of Upper Hutt. For services to the New Zealand Defence Force.
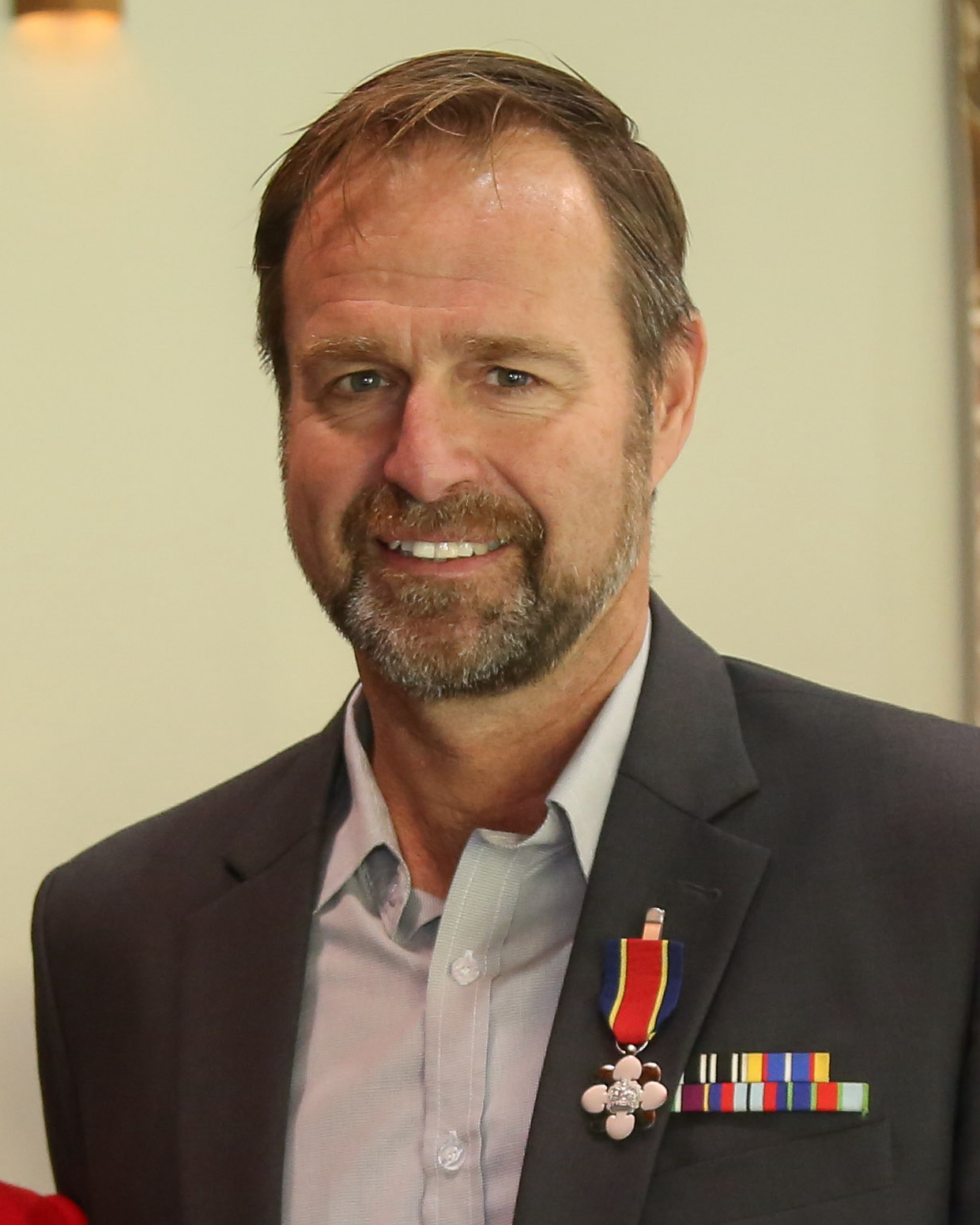
Glenn Gowthorpe

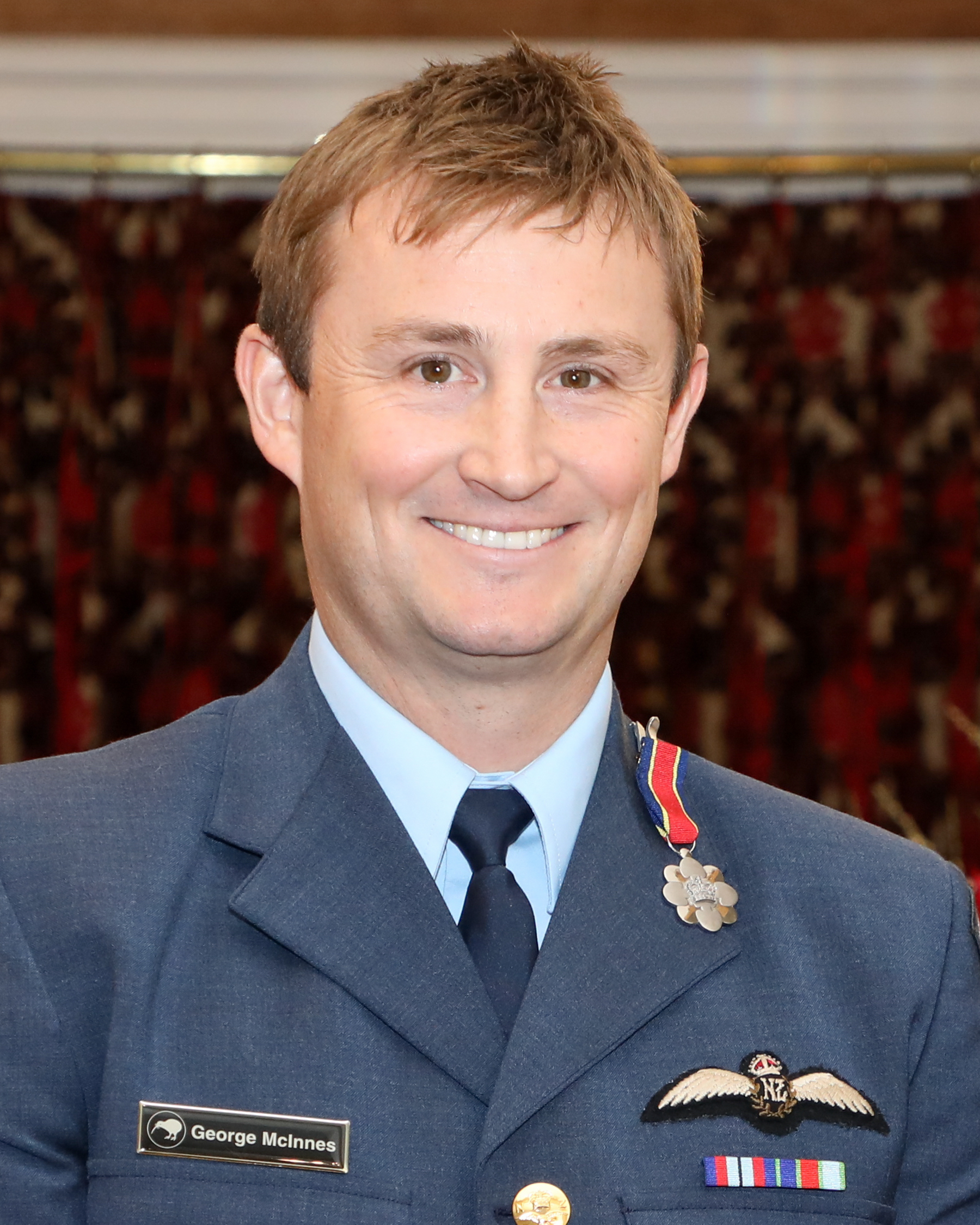
George McInnes

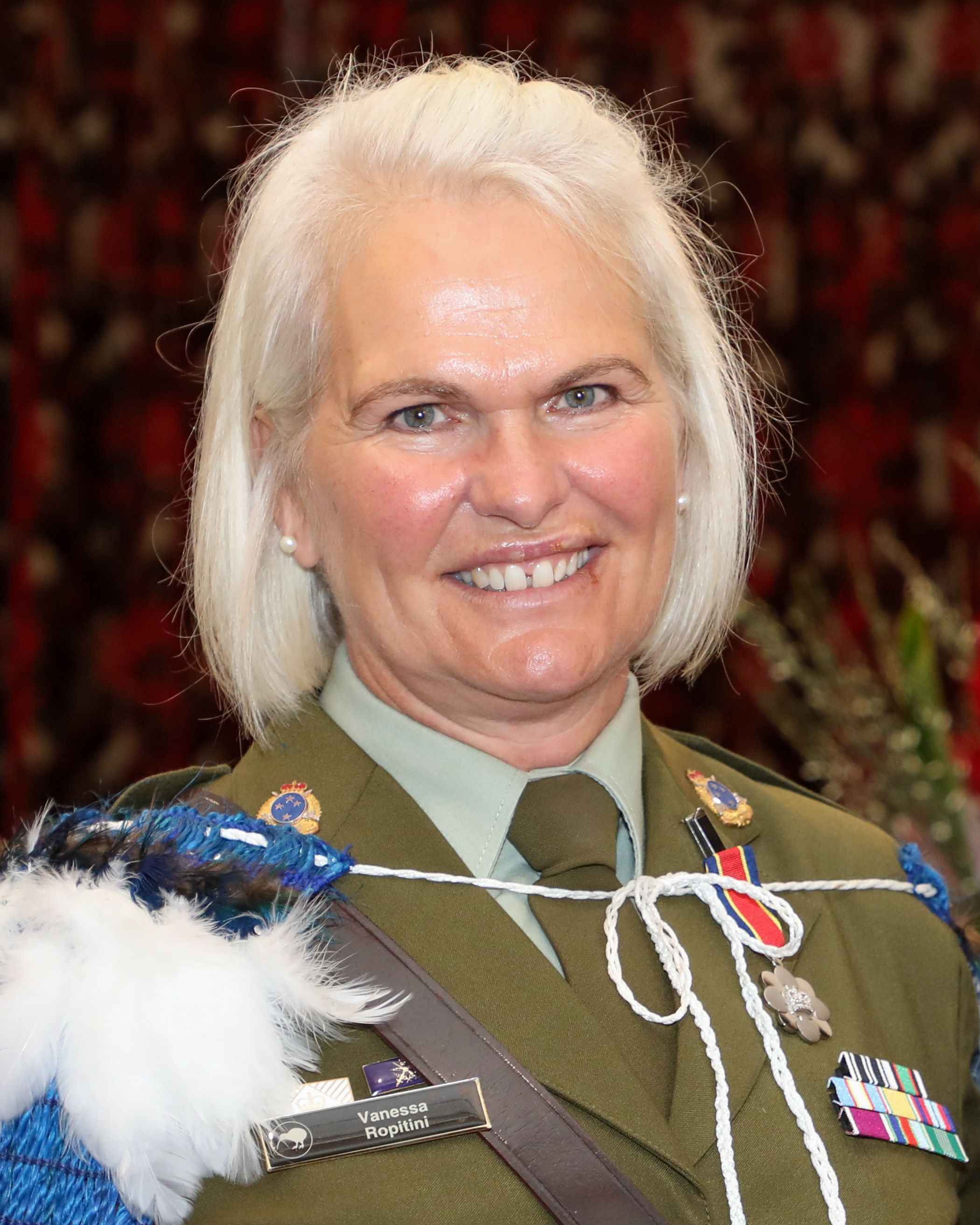
Vanessa Ropitini
